= List of zarzuela composers =

Zarzuela is a lyric-dramatic art form which alternates between spoken and sung scenes. The latter incorporate both operatic arias and choruses and popular songs, as well as dance. The genre originated in Spain as a court entertainment in the 17th century and is still performed today, primarily in Spain, Latin America and the Philippines. The following is a list of composers who have written works in this genre.

- Pedro Acerden (Philippines)
- Daniel Alomía Robles January 3, 1871 (Huánuco) – 18 June 1942 (Lima)
- Francisco Alonso May 9, 1887 (Granada) – May 19, 1948 (Madrid)
- Emilio Arrieta October 21, 1823 (Puente la Reina) – February 11, 1894 (Madrid)
- Francisco Asenjo Barbieri August 3, 1823 (Madrid) – February 19, 1894 (Madrid)
- Tomás Bretón December 29, 1850 (Salamanca) – December 2, 1923) (Madrid)
- Ramón Carnicer October 24, 1789 (Tàrrega) – March 17, 1855 (Madrid)
- José Castel 1737 (Tudela) – 1807
- Ruperto Chapí March 27, 1851 (Villena) – March 25, 1909 (Madrid)
- Federico Chueca May 5, 1846 (Madrid) – July 20, 1908 (Madrid)
- Carlo Curti May 6, 1859 (Gallicchio) – 1926 (Mexico City)
- Manuel de Falla November 23, 1876 (Cádiz) – November 14, 1946 (Alta Gracia)
- Manuel Fernández Caballero March 14, 1835 (Murcia) – February 26, 1906 (Madrid)
- Joaquín Gaztambide February 7, 1822 (Tudela) – March 18, 1870 (Madrid)
- Gerónimo Giménez October 10, 1854 (Seville) – February 19, 1923 (Madrid)
- Jacinto Guerrero August 16, 1895 (Ajofrín) – September 15, 1951 (Madrid)
- Jesús Guridi September 25, 1886 (Vitoria-Gasteiz) – April 7, 1961 (Madrid)
- Lluís Jordá June 16, 1869 (Roda de Ter) – September 20, 1961 (Barcelona)
- Ernesto Lecuona August 6, 1895 (Guanabacoa) – November 29, 1963 (Santa Cruz de Tenerife)
- Antonio de Literes June 18, 1673 (Mallorca) – January 18, 1747 (Madrid)

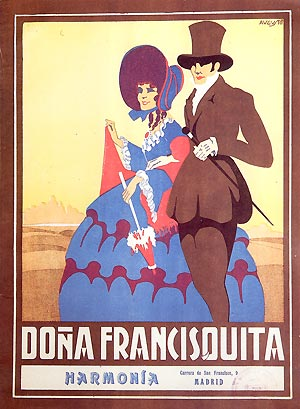
Poster for Doña Francisquita, composed by Amadeo Vives

- Patricio Mariano 17 March 1877 (Santa Cruz, Manila) – 28 January 1935 (Manila)
- Miguel Marqués May 20, 1843 (Palma de Mallorca) – February 15, 1918 (Palma de Mallorca)
- Rafael Millán September 24, 1893 (Algeciras) – March 8, 1957 (Madrid)
- Federico Moreno Torroba March 3, 1891 (Madrid) – September 12, 1982 (Madrid)
- Cristóbal Oudrid February 7, 1825 (Badajoz) – March 13, 1877 (Madrid)
- José Padilla May 23, 1889 (Almería) – October 25, 1960 (Madrid)
- Rodrigo Prats February 7, 1909 (Sagua la Grande) – September 15, 1980 (Havana)
- Maria Rodrigo March 20, 1888 (Madrid) – December 8, 1967 (San Juan)
- Gonzalo Roig July 20, 1890 (Havana) – June 13, 1970 (Havana)
- Emilio Serrano March 13, 1850 (Vitoria-Gasteiz) – April 8, 1939 (Madrid)
- José Serrano October 14, 1873 (Sueca) – March 8, 1941 (Madrid)
- Pablo Sorozábal September 18, 1897 (San Sebastián) – December 26, 1988 (Madrid)
- Reveriano Soutullo July 11, 1880 (Pontevedra) – October 28, 1932 (Madrid)
- Joaquín Valverde February 27, 1846 (Badajoz) – March 17, 1910 (Madrid)
- Juan Vert April 22, 1890 (Carcaixent) – February 16, 1931 (Madrid)
- Amadeo Vives November 18, 1871 (Collbató) – December 1, 1932 (Madrid)

== See also ==
- List of composers
