= Chronological list of Spanish classical composers =

The following is a chronological list of classical music composers who have lived in, worked in, or been citizens of Spain.

== Renaissance ==
- Bartomeu Càrceres (fl. 1546)
- Juan Cornago (1400–1475)
- Bartolomé Ramos de Pareja (1440–1522)
- Francisco de la Torre (1460–1504)
- Juan de Anchieta (1462–1523)
- Gabriel Mena (1470–1528)
- Juan del Encina (1468–1529)
- Mateu Fletxa (1481–1553)
- Cristóbal de Morales (1500–1553)
- Luis de Milán (c. 1500–1561)
- Miguel de Fuenllana (1500–1579)
- Bartolomé de Escobedo (1510–1563)
- Antonio de Cabezón (1510–1566)
- Diego Ortiz (1510–1570)
- Alonso Mudarra (1510–1580)
- Pedro Guerrero (b. ca. 1520)
- Luis de Narváez (fl. 1526–1549)
- Tomás Luis de Victoria (1548–1611)
- Francisco Guerrero (1528–1599)
- Sebastián de Vivanco (1551–1622)
- Juan Blas de Castro (c.1561–1631)

== Baroque ==
- Joan Pau Pujol (1570–1626)
- Bartolomé de Selma y Salaverde (1580–1640)
- Francisco Correa de Arauxo (1584–1654)
- Juan Pérez Bocanegra (1598–1645)
- Carlos Patiño (1600–1675)
- Juan Arañés (?-c.1649)
- Urbán de Vargas (1606–1656)
- Pablo Bruna (1611–1679)
- Juan Hidalgo de Polanco (1614–1685)
- Joan Cererols (1618–1680)
- José Marín (1619–1699)
- Cristóbal Galán (1630–1684)
- Miguel de Irízar (1635–1684)
- Gaspar Sanz (1640–1710)
- Juan Bautista José Cabanilles (1644–1712)
- Tomás de Torrejón y Velasco (1644–1728)
- Juan de Araujo (1646–1712)
- Francisco Guerau (1649–1717/1722)
- Antonio Martín y Coll (c.1660–1734)
- José de Torres y Martínez Bravo (1665–1738)
- Antonio de Literes (1673–1747)
- Santiago de Murcia (1673–1739)

== Classical era ==
- Joan Baptista Pla (1720–1773)
- Antonio Rodríguez de Hita (1722–1787)
- Luis Misón (1727–1776)
- Antonio Soler (1729–1783)
- Juan Sesé y Balaguer (1736–1801)
- Anselm Viola i Valentí (1738–1798)
- Narciso Casanovas (1747–1799)
- Manuel Blasco de Nebra (1750–1784)
- Vicente Martín y Soler (1754–1806)
- Mateo Albéniz (1755–1831)

== Romantic ==
- Fernando Sor (1778–1839)
- Dionisio Aguado (1784–1849)
- Ramón Carnicer (1789–1855)
- Pedro Albéniz (1795–1855)
- Juan Crisóstomo Arriaga (1806–1826)
- Emilio Arrieta (1821–1894)
- Jaime Nunó (1824–1908)
- Felip Pedrell (1841–1922)
- Pablo de Sarasate (1844–1908)
- Federico Chueca (1846–1908)
- Joaquín Valverde Durán (1846–1910)
- Tomás Bretón (1850–1923)
- Ruperto Chapí (1851–1909)
- Francisco Tárrega (1852–1909)
- Gerónimo Giménez y Bellido (1854–1923)
- Isaac Albéniz (1860–1909)
- Enrique Fernández Arbós (1863–1939)
- Antonio Álvarez Alonso (1867–1903)
- Enrique Granados (1867–1916)

== Modern/Contemporary ==
- Amadeo Vives (1871–1932)
- Eduardo Torres (1872–1934)
- Pascual Marquina Narro (1873–1948)
- Joaquín "Quinito" Valverde Sanjuán (1875–1918)
- Manuel de Falla (1876–1946)
- Joaquin Nin (1879–1949)
- Ramón Montoya (1880–1949)
- Joaquín Turina (1882–1949)
- Manuel Infante (1883–1958)
- Óscar Esplá (1886–1976)
- Jesús Guridi (1886–1961)
- José María Usandizaga (1887–1915)
- Federico Moreno Torroba (1891–1982)
- Federico Mompou (1893–1987)
- Roberto Gerhard (1896–1970)
- Fernando Obradors (1897–1945)
- Pablo Sorozábal (1897–1988)
- Ricard Lamote de Grignon (1899–1965)
- Rodolfo Halffter (1900–1987)
- Joaquín Rodrigo (1901–1999)
- Niño Ricardo (1904–1972)
- Ernesto Halffter (1905–1989)
- Joaquin Homs (1906–2006)
- Joaquín Nin-Culmell (1908–2004)
- Sabicas (1912–1990)
- Xavier Montsalvatge (1912–2002)
- Carlos Suriñach (1915–1997)
- Manuel Valls (composer) (1920–1984)
- Narciso Yepes (1927–1997)
- Josep Mestres Quadreny (1929–2021)
- Cristóbal Halffter (1930–2021)
- Luis de Pablo (1930–2021)
- Leonardo Balada (born 1933)
- Antón García Abril (1933-2021)
- Antonio Ruiz-Pipò (1934–1997)
- Gonzalo de Olavide (1934–2005)
- Lorenzo Palomo (1938-2024)
- Fernando Arbex (1941–2003)
- Tomás Marco (born 1942)
- Manolo Sanlúcar (born 1945)
- Paco de Lucía (1947–2014)
- José Luis Turina (born 1952)
- Pedro Vilarroig (born 1954)
- Elisenda Fábregas (born 1955)
- Alberto Iglesias (born 1955)
- Benet Casablancas (born 1956)
- Ortiz Morales (born 1959)
- David del Puerto (born 1964)
- Juan J. Colomer (born 1966)
- Vicente Amigo (born 1967)
- Ramon Lazkano (born 1968)
- José María Sánchez-Verdú (born 1968)
- Octavio Vázquez (born 1972)
- Bohdan Syroyid (born 1995)
- María Dueñas (born 2002)
