= Spanish opera =

Music genre

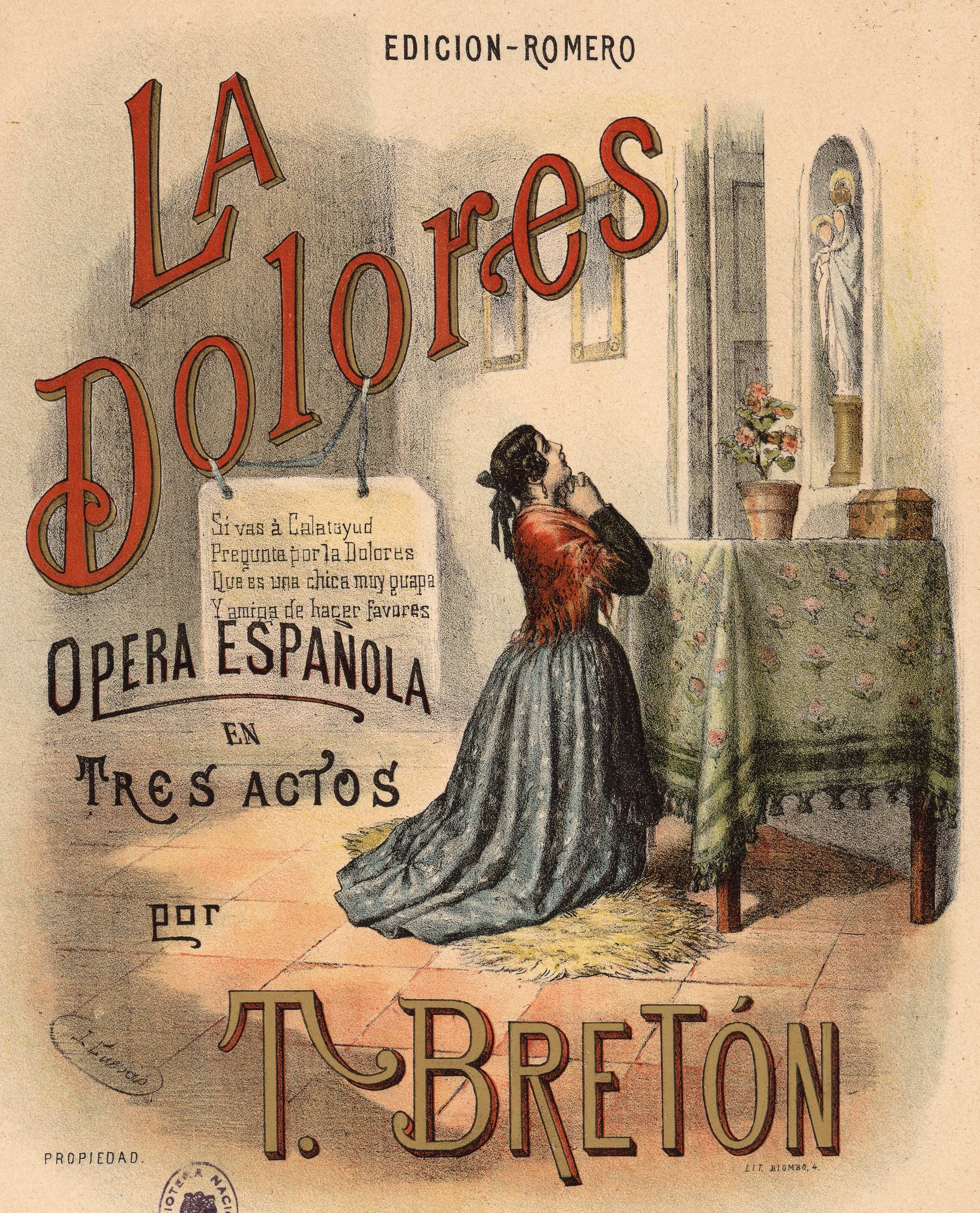
La Dolores, one of the most famous Spanish operas

Spanish opera is both the art of opera in Spain and opera in the Spanish language. Opera has existed in Spain since the mid-17th century.

== Early history ==
Opera was slow to develop within Spain in comparison to France, Italy and (to a lesser extent) Germany, all of which have had continuous traditions of opera since the early part of the 17th century. One of the reasons for this slow development was Spain's strong tradition of spoken drama, which made some critics believe that opera was a less worthy art form. However, there was a tradition of songs given within largely spoken plays which began in the early 16th century by such distinguished composers as Juan del Encina.

The earliest Spanish operas appeared in the mid-17th century, with libretti by such famous writers as Calderón de la Barca and Lope de Vega to music by such composers as Juan Hidalgo de Polanco. These early operas, however, failed to catch the imagination of the Spanish public. It was not until the increasing popularity of such genres as ballad opera and opéra comique that opera in Spain started to gain momentum, since the use of speech in the vernacular inevitably encouraged Spanish composers to develop their own national style of opera: zarzuela.

== Zarzuela ==
Zarzuela is characterized by a mixture of sung and spoken dialogue. Although Juan Hidalgo de Polanco's early forays into opera were more along the lines of Italian opera, he was instrumental in helping to create the art form, composing the first known zarzuela, El laurel de Apolo, in 1657. The courtly Baroque zarzuela, a mixture of sophisticated verse drama, allegorical opera, popular song, and dance, became the fashion of the Spanish court for over the next 100 years.

The opera artform flourished in Spain during the eighteenth century, with two excellent composers, Sebastián Durón and Antonio Literes. Literes' opera Accis y Galatea (1708) was particularly popular. Also of note later in the century was Rodrígues de Hita (c.1724–87), who used guitars, mandolins, tambourines, and castanets and incorporated spectacular dancing into his opera Las labradoras de Murcia (1769). The zarzuela (in this sense) was eventually superseded by a yet simpler entertainment, the tonadilla escénica (usually a down-to-earth story of everyday folk), but this too became increasingly sophisticated. Eventually the popularity of zarzuela waned at the end of the 18th century, with the last known zarzuela of the century, Clementina by Luigi Boccherini, premiering in 1787. For over the next sixty years, Italian opera became the predominantly popular form of opera in Spain.

In the mid-19th century, there was a renewed interest in the zarzuela in Spain, just as in other countries an increasing national awareness gave rise to distinctive styles to combat the pervading influence of Italian opera. It has been estimated that over 10,000 zarzuelas were written in the hundred years after 1850. The Teatro de la Zarzuela in Madrid became the hub of activity, but scores of companies in the capital, the provinces, and Spanish-speaking Central and South America were busily performing zarzuela in repertory.

Of particular note is composer Francisco Asenjo Barbieri who aimed to create a distinctively national operatic style which fused the traditional tonadilla and the old, aristocratic drama into a new form evolved from Italian comic opera. In contrast, Emilio Arrieta stayed closer to ‘pure’ Romantic Italian models in such zarzuelas as Marina (1855). The two became intense rivals within the eyes of the public and their competitive behavior made zarzuela extremely popular.

Other composers, such as Tomás Bretón and Ruperto Chapí, wrote smaller zarzuelas known as género chico which were farces in one-act. These farcical operas often contained social or political satire and usually contained less music and more spoken dialogue than other forms of zarzuela. The género chico reached its height of popularity in the 1880s and 1890s with composer Federico Chueca.

In the 20th century, the zarzuela evolved with popular taste, though the mixture of spoken play and operatic music in roughly equal proportions remained. Some composers created operatic-scale zarzuelas, with a greater proportion of music and not only comical plots. Las golondrinas by José María Usandizaga, Rafael Millán's La dogaresa (1920), Amadeu Vives' Doña Francisquita (1923) or La villana (1927) are true operas with some spoken dialogues. Operetta-zarzuelas, most notably by Pablo Luna and Amadeo Vives, coexisted with revue-style farces such as Francisco Alonso's Las leandras (1931) and sentimental verismo dramas such as José Serrano's La dolorosa (1930). In the 1930s Pablo Sorozábal attempted to restore the satirical thrust of the 1890s, but after the Spanish Civil War, the distinctive quality of zarzuela was lost in imitations of the Broadway musical. Since 1960, very few new works have entered the repertory, but the popularity of the classic zarzuelas continues.

== Through-sung opera ==
Although many through-sung Spanish operas have been written, either full-length or in one act, very few have entered the international repertoire. Manuel de Falla's La vida breve and Enrique Granados's Goyescas are one-act works often heard and seen in Spain and abroad. Tomás Bretón's La Dolores, Ruperto Chapí's Margarita la tornera and certain English-language operas of Isaac Albéniz - notably Merlin and Pepita Jiménez - are full-length works which have been performed in Europe and America as well as Spain.

Spanish-language operas written and widely-heard in the Americas and elsewhere include three by Alberto Ginastera - notably Bomarzo, (New York, 1967); and the Mexican composer Daniel Catán's Florencia en el Amazonas (Houston, 1996).

== See also ==
- History of opera
- Teatro Real
- Liceu

== Sources ==
- Nicholas Temperley: "Opera", Grove Music Online ed. L. Macy (Accessed October 25, 2008), (subscription access)
- Christopher Webber: The Zarzuela Companion (Scarecrow Press Inc., 2002) Lib. Cong. 2002110168 / ISBN 0-8108-4447-8
