= Art song =

Vocal music composition, usually written for one voice with piano accompaniment

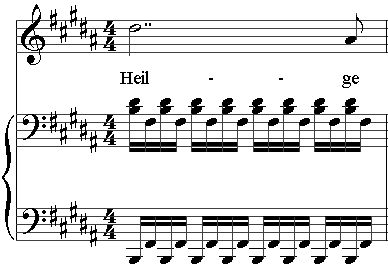
Bar five of Schubert's art song entitled Nacht und Träume. The vocal part, including the melody notes and the text, is in the top stave. The two staves below are the piano part.

An art song is a Western vocal music composition, usually written for one voice with piano accompaniment, and usually in the classical art music tradition. By extension, the term "art song" is used to refer to the collective genre of such songs (e.g., the "art song repertoire"). An art song is most often a musical setting of an independent poem or text, "intended for the concert repertory" "as part of a recital or other relatively formal social occasion". While many vocal music pieces are easily recognized as art songs, others are more difficult to categorize. For example, a wordless vocalise written by a classical composer is sometimes considered an art song and sometimes not.

Other factors help define art songs:

- Songs that are part of a staged work (such as an aria from an opera or a song from a musical) are not usually considered art songs. However, some Baroque arias that "appear with great frequency in recital performance" are now included in the art song repertoire.
- Songs with instruments besides piano (e.g., cello and piano) and/or other singers are referred to as "vocal chamber music", and are usually not considered art songs.
- Songs originally written for voice and orchestra are called "orchestral songs" and are not usually considered art songs, unless their original version was for solo voice and piano.
- Folk songs and traditional songs are generally not considered art songs, unless they are art music-style concert arrangements with piano accompaniment written by a specific composer Several examples of these songs include Aaron Copland's two volumes of Old American Songs, the Folksong arrangements by Benjamin Britten, and the Siete canciones populares españolas (Seven Spanish Folksongs) by Manuel de Falla.
- There is no agreement regarding sacred songs. Many song settings of biblical or sacred texts were composed for the concert stage and not for religious services; these are widely known as art songs (for example, the Vier ernste Gesänge by Johannes Brahms). Other sacred songs may or may not be considered art songs.
- A group of art songs composed to be performed in a group to form a narrative or dramatic whole is called a song cycle.

== Languages and nationalities ==
A recording of singer Helge Rosvaenge (Tenor) and Gerald Moore, Pianoforte, performing Der Feuerreiter

Art songs have been composed in many languages, and are known by several names. The German tradition of art song composition is perhaps the most prominent one; it is known as Lieder. In France, the term mélodie distinguishes art songs from other French vocal pieces referred to as chansons. The Spanish canción and the Italian canzone refer to songs generally and not specifically to art songs.

== Form ==
The composer's musical language and interpretation of the text often dictate the formal design of an art song. If all of the poem's verses are sung to the same music, the song is strophic. Arrangements of folk songs are often strophic, and "there are exceptional cases in which the musical repetition provides dramatic irony for the changing text, or where an almost hypnotic monotony is desired." Several of the songs in Schubert's Die schöne Müllerin are good examples of this. If the vocal melody remains the same but the accompaniment changes under it for each verse, the piece is called a "modified strophic" song. In contrast, songs in which "each section of the text receives fresh music" are called through-composed. Most through-composed works have some repetition of musical material in them. Many art songs use some version of the ABA form (also known as "song form" or "ternary form"), with a beginning musical section, a contrasting middle section, and a return to the first section's music. In some cases, in the return to the first section's music, the composer may make minor changes.

== Performance and performers ==
Performance of art songs in recital requires special skills for both the singer and pianist. The degree of intimacy "seldom equaled in other kinds of music" requires that the two performers "communicate to the audience the most subtle and evanescent emotions as expressed in the poem and music". The two performers must agree on all aspects of the performance to create a unified partnership, making art song performance one of the "most sensitive type(s) of collaboration". As well, the pianist must be able to closely match the mood and character expressed by the singer. Even though classical vocalists generally embark on successful performing careers as soloists by seeking out opera engagements, a number of today's most prominent singers have built their careers primarily by singing art songs, including Dietrich Fischer-Dieskau, Thomas Quasthoff, Ian Bostridge, Matthias Goerne, Wolfgang Holzmair, Susan Graham and Elly Ameling. Pianists, too, have specialized in playing art songs with great singers. Gerald Moore, Geoffrey Parsons, Graham Johnson, Dalton Baldwin, Hartmut Höll and Martin Katz are six such pianists who have specialized in accompanying art song performances. The piano parts in art songs can be so complex that the piano part is not really a subordinate accompaniment part; the pianist in challenging art songs is more of an equal partner with the solo singer. As such, some pianists who specialize in performing art song recitals with singers refer to themselves as "collaborative pianists", rather than as accompanists.

== Composers ==
=== English ===
- John Dowland
- Thomas Campion
- William Byrd
- Thomas Morley
- Henry Purcell
- Hubert Parry
- Frederick Delius
- Ralph Vaughan Williams
- Roger Quilter
- John Ireland
- Ivor Gurney
- Peter Warlock
- Michael Head
- Madeleine Dring
- Gerald Finzi
- Jonathan Dove
- Benjamin Britten
- Michael Tippett
- Ian Venables
- Judith Weir
- George Butterworth
- Francis George Scott
- Rebecca Clarke

=== American ===
- Stephen Foster
- Amy Beach
- Theodore Chanler
- Arthur Farwell
- Charles Ives
- Charles Griffes
- Ernst Bacon
- John Jacob Niles
- John Woods Duke
- Ned Rorem
- Richard Faith
- Samuel Barber
- Aaron Copland
- George Walker (composer)
- Lee Hoiby
- William Bolcom
- George Crumb
- Dominick Argento
- John Harbison
- Philip Glass
- Libby Larsen
- Juliana Hall
- Tom Cipullo
- Lori Laitman
- Daron Hagen
- Richard Hundley
- Emma Lou Diemer
- Ben Moore (composer)
- Ricky Ian Gordon
- Jake Heggie
- John Musto
- Sarah Hutchings
- Laura Schwendinger

=== Austrian and German ===
- Carl Philipp Emanuel Bach
- Joseph Haydn
- Wolfgang Amadeus Mozart
- Ludwig van Beethoven
- Franz Schubert
- Felix Mendelssohn
- Fanny Hensel
- Robert Schumann
- Clara Schumann
- Carl Loewe
- Johannes Brahms
- Hugo Wolf
- Gustav Mahler
- Richard Strauss
- Joseph Marx
- Alexander von Zemlinsky
- Arnold Schoenberg
- Anton Webern
- Alban Berg
- Erich Wolfgang Korngold
- Viktor Ullmann
- Hanns Eisler
- Kurt Weill
- Paul Hindemith
- Wilhelm Killmayer
- Josephine Lang
- Emilie Mayer

=== French ===
- Hector Berlioz
- Charles Gounod
- Pauline Viardot
- César Franck
- Camille Saint-Saëns
- Georges Bizet
- Emmanuel Chabrier
- Henri Duparc
- Jules Massenet
- Gabriel Fauré
- Claude Debussy
- Erik Satie
- Maurice Ravel
- Lili Boulanger
- Nadia Boulanger
- Albert Roussel
- Reynaldo Hahn
- Darius Milhaud
- Francis Poulenc
- Olivier Messiaen
- Henri Dutilleux
- Cécile Chaminade

=== Romanian ===
- George Enescu
- Dinu Lipatti
- Pascal Bentoiu
- Irina Hasnaș
- Felicia Donceanu

=== Spanish ===
19th century:

- Francisco Asenjo Barbieri
- Ramón Carnicer y Batlle
- Ruperto Chapí
- Antonio de la Cruz
- Isabella Colbran
- Manuel Fernández Caballero
- Manuel García
- Sebastián de Iradier
- José León
- Cristóbal Oudrid
- Antonio Reparaz
- Emilio Serrano y Ruiz
- Fernando Sor
- Joaquín Valverde
- Amadeo Vives

20th century:

- Enrique Granados
- Manuel de Falla
- Joaquín Rodrigo
- Joaquín Turina
- David del Puerto

=== Latin American ===
In Spanish:

- Juan Guerra González – El Salvador
- Roberto Caamaño – Argentina
- Hector Campos-Parsi – Puerto Rico
- Pompeyo Camps – Argentina
- Carlos Chávez – Mexico (also in German and English)
- Alberto Ginastera – Argentina
- Carlos Guastavino – Argentina
- Mario Lavista – Mexico
- Jaime León Ferro – Colombia
- Julián Orbón – Cuba
- Juan Orrego-Salas – Chile
- Carlos Pedrell – Uruguay
- Juan Bautista Plaza – Venezuela
- Manuel Ponce – Mexico
- Silvestre Revueltas – Mexico
- Miguel Sandoval – Guatemala
- Domingo Santa Cruz – Chile
- Andrés Sas – Peru
- Guillermo Uribe-Holguín – Colombia
- Aurelio de la Vega – Cuba

In Portuguese (all Brazilian):

- Ernani Braga
- Camargo Guarnieri
- Osvaldo Lacerda
- Jaime Ovalle
- Heitor Villa-Lobos (also songs in Italian, French, English, Spanish, Nheengatu, and Latin)

=== Italian ===
- Claudio Monteverdi
- Barbara Strozzi
- Gioachino Rossini
- Gaetano Donizetti
- Vincenzo Bellini
- Francesca Caccini
- Giuseppe Verdi
- Amilcare Ponchielli
- Paolo Tosti
- Ottorino Respighi
- Mario Castelnuovo-Tedesco
- Luciano Berio
- Lorenzo Ferrero

=== Eastern European ===
- Franz Liszt – Hungary (nearly all his art song settings are of texts in non-Hungarian European languages, such as French and German)
- Antonín Dvořák – Bohemia
- Leoš Janáček – Bohemia (Czechoslovakia)
- Béla Bartók – Hungary
- Zoltán Kodály – Hungary
- Frédéric Chopin – Poland
- Stanisław Moniuszko – Poland
- Eugen Suchoň – Slovakia
- Mykola Lysenko - Ukraine
- Mykola Leontovych - Ukraine

=== Nordic ===
- Hugo Alfvén – Sweden
- Edvard Grieg – Norway (set German as well as Norse and Danish poetry)
- Yrjö Kilpinen – Finland
- Carl Nielsen – Denmark
- Leevi Madetoja – Finland
- Ture Rangström – Sweden
- Jean Sibelius – Finland
- Wilhelm Stenhammar – Sweden

=== Irish ===
- Ina Boyle
- Aloys Fleischmann
- Herbert Hughes
- Charles Villiers Stanford

=== Russian ===
- Mikhail Glinka
- Alexander Borodin
- César Cui
- Nikolai Medtner
- Modest Mussorgsky
- Pyotr Ilyich Tchaikovsky
- Nikolai Rimsky-Korsakov
- Alexander Glazunov
- Sergei Rachmaninoff
- Sergei Prokofiev
- Igor Stravinsky
- Dmitri Shostakovich

=== Ukrainian ===
- Vasyl Barvinsky
- Stanyslav Lyudkevych
- Mykola Lysenko
- Nestor Nyzhankivsky
- Ostap Nyzhankivsky
- Denys Sichynsky
- Myroslav Skoryk
- Ihor Sonevytsky
- Yakiv Stepovy
- Kyrylo Stetsenko

=== Welsh ===
- Dilys Elwyn-Edwards
- Morfydd Llwyn Owen
- Gareth Glyn
- Mansel Thomas
- Meirion Williams

=== Asian ===
- Huang Zi – China
- Nicanor Abelardo – Philippines
- Ananda Sukarlan – Indonesia
- Byambasuren Sharav – Mongolia

=== Afrikaans ===
- Jellmar Ponticha
- Stephanus Le Roux Marais

=== Arabic ===
- Iyad Kanaan – Lebanon

== See also ==
- Kundiman
- Song
- Song cycle
