= Género chico =

Opera and music genre

Género chico (literally, "little genre") is a Spanish genre of short, light plays with music. It is a major branch of zarzuela, Spain's form of popular music theatre with dialogue, and differs from zarzuela grande and most other operatic forms both in its brevity and by being aimed at audiences of a wide social spectrum.

== Origin and development ==
=== Historical context ===
Zarzuela was developed during the reign of Philip IV (1605–1665, reigned from 1621), who during the 1640s began to commission musico-theatrical entertainments on mythological themes mixed with popular peasant song and dance, from the writer Calderón de la Barca working with composers such as Juan de Hidalgo. These were performed at the Royal hunting lodge, the Palacio de la Zarzuela. During the next two hundred years, zarzuela, as these mixed entertainments swiftly became known, became the native-language alternative to the Italian operatic form nurtured by successive monarchs.

In the 19th century, the country's tense political circumstances affected zarzuela. Isabella II fell from power during the liberal revolution of 1868, and the country found itself submerged in a crisis at all levels: economic, political, and ideological (with various strands of socialism coming to prominence). Instability increased with the 1870 assassination of Juan Prim, President of the regency council and Marshal of Spain. For economic and other reasons, there was a sharp drop in theatre box-office sales, as most people could not afford the average fourteen reales for non-necessities. Such high prices, plus the national uncertainty, brought most Madrid theatres into crisis, and many - including the Teatro de la Zarzuela itself - came close to ruin.

=== The beginning ===
Against this trend, Juan José Luján, Antonio Riquelme and José Vallés, three actors, had the idea of splitting the afternoon at the theatre into four parts of one hour each, creating the so-called sesiones por horas, or "performances by the hour", which cost barely a real, and were given in down-market theatres. This kept the seats filled, since people came more often, due to low prices. Managers accepted the idea, needing customers.

They wanted to repeat the success of teatro cómico, an earlier phenomenon that copied Offenbach's comic model, and was brought by the theatre manager Arderíus to the Madrid Variety Theatre (with his own El Joven Telémaco — "Young Telemachus" — as the main draw). The comedic model for these featured zany, unpredictable plots based on myths, tending towards caricature and mockery of various topics such as royalty, the Army, and politics. They do so with pleasant, catchy music with a certain popular, erotic tone. Comic operas of this sort were nevertheless quickly eclipsed by the expansion of the género chico and became less popular after the mid-1870s.

Because of the need for short operetta-like works that could fit into one hour, the first performances were of old plays that were already popular, such as El Maestro de baile ("The Dancing Master", by Luis Misón, and predating the género chico by many years), or plays like Una vieja ("An Old Woman", Joaquín Gaztambide) and El grumete ("The Cabin Boy", Emilio Arrieta). These plays had originally been considered secondary and were programmed as such, beside larger, more important zarzuelas, but with a change of taste and the tendency towards nationalism and German opera, the Italian taste copied by the zarzuelas would fall out of fashion, whilst the character of these little plays shone for itself. With time, new short plays were written for this short format and jolly style, notably influenced by the comic genre (with suggestive titles such as La hoja de parra ("The Fig Leaf") or Dice el sexto mandamiento ("According to the Sixth Commandment").

It is easy to see that the goal of género chico is purely to entertain the audience. Unlike the serious, dramatic themes and complicated plots in zarzuela mayor, this genre presented simplified farces about everyday topics such as daily life in Madrid. This is why it was so successful with the public: apart from the low price, people could easily follow the plot and identify with the characters.

=== Development ===
The decade of the 1870s saw the genre consolidate itself, with numerous authors publishing, for example Miguel Nieto and his El Gorro Frigio ("The Phrygian Cap"), and Fernández Caballero's Château Margaux. The genre was now centred on a model similar to that of contemporary realist literature, mainly with the musical form of lyrical one-act farces.

The definitive accolade that the género chico would receive was with Chueca and Valverde's La Gran Vía, in the summer of 1886. The play, named after a major street that was then under construction through the heart of Madrid, was so successful that it went from the summer theatres to the Apolo, and was repeated several times. It incorporated a series of lively, unrelated one-act farces on current affairs. Federico Chueca was one of the most prolific and important chico composer-librettists, often collaborating with Joaquín Valverde Durán. His work includes El año pasado por agua ("Last Year Under Water"), Agua, azucarillos y aguardiente ("Water, Sweets, and Spirits"), perhaps the most popular nowadays, La alegría de la huerta ("The happiness of the orchard"), El arca de Noé ("Noah's Ark"), Los descamisados ("The Shirtless Ones") and more.

Another common model for these works was comparison of two places: De Madrid a París (Chueca y Velarde, "From Madrid to Paris") or De Getafe al paraíso ("From Getafe to Paradise", a two-act zarzuela by Barbieri, Getafe is a town close to Madrid), Cádiz (Valverde). Other important playwrights were Giménez, Joaquín "Quinito" Valverde Sanjuán (Joaquín Valverde Durán's son), Tomás Lopez Torregrosa (San Antón and El santo de la Isidra ["Isidra's Saint", Isidra being one of the characters]) Fernández Caballero (El dúo de la africana [The Duet from L'Africaine, a reference to the opera by Meyerbeer], El cabo primero ["The Headman", that is, the person in command], La viejecita ["The Little Old Lady"], and Gigantes y cabezudos ["Giants and cabezudos"]; named after popular Spanish parade disguises), Jerónimo Jiménez (El baile de Luis Alonso ["The Dance of Luis Alonso"] and its sequel La boda de Luis Alonso ["The Marriage of Luis Alonso"]).

One very important auteur was Ruperto Chapí, who spent his life oscillating between attempts to create a proper Spanish opera, and his modest género chico plays, which included Música Clásica ("Classical Music"), La revoltosa ("The Rebel Girl"), ¡Las doce y media y sereno! ("Half Past Midnight and all is quiet"), y El tambor de granaderos ("The Grenadiers' Drum").

Finally, one of the best-known examples of género chico was La verbena de la Paloma ("The Fair of the Dove", set at a verbena on the night of the Virgin of the Paloma, August 14) ^{[usurped]};, by composer Tomás Bretón. This popular piece came about following several years of experiments by its creator.

The género chico was to decline in importance with the turn of the 19th century.

== Performance venues ==
The idea of performances by the hour began in cheap theatres, the Teatro del Recreo being the first. Whilst the critics were harsh with the genre, it was a great success with the public and was adopted by a few more theatres, to the point where it took over the Variedades theater, which the decline of comic opera had left free, and which was already a venue of some note. But the most important venue associated with the género chico is the Teatro Apolo, opened in 1873, which, following the crisis in zarzuela grande, began to put on género chico, to overwhelming popular success.

The Apolo was considered the real bastion of the genre, and very famous because of the popularity of its fourth session, "la cuarta de Apolo", which was a night-time performance and was always full of dodgy characters, rogues and tricksters no different from the villains represented on stage. Outside of the theatres, the género chico was also performed in small cafés, and during the summer cheap stages were set up for plays. Indeed, the arguably most important play in the genre, La Gran Vía, was performed in this way.

== Lyrical farce as form of género chico ==
The main model for género chico is the sainete lírico or one-act lyrical farce, thanks to the successful La canción de la Lola ("Lola's Song") by Chueca and Valverde, in 1880. Although other genres are also utilised, the most important plays follow this model. The sainete, established in its definitive form by Ramón de la Cruz, is the direct heir of the comic interludes or brief farces that were previously so popular. These are essentially short, independent pieces, with music and often dance. The género chico evolved from this form towards a relatively faithful portrait of everyday Madrid life, in keeping with the abovementioned Realism. However, unlike Realism, which lingers on the darker and murkier aspects of reality, such as poor, marginal sections of society and the violence running through them, the género chico, whilst dealing with low-class neighbourhoods and uneducated people, concentrated on the jollier, picturesque aspects of Madrid, such as the dialect of the characters, and their most jovial facets.

Moreover, as a unique characteristic of the genre, the constant presence of open-air parties, often at night, which appear at the beginning of the plays in order to situate them and at the end as dénouement.

=== Libretto ===
The plot is very simple, and sometimes barely holds up the play, which then relies on the scenes it creates. In the majority of cases, it consists of a simple love story with the same basic structure: a couple is in love but some outside difficulty prevents them from consummating their love (always, by marrying each other in a happy ending); this difficulty is overcome and the story ends with a public dénouement, a happy ending and an implicit or explicit moral (as well as asking the audience's favour at the very end). Beside this structure, stereotyped characters from the Madrid scene are brought in (Madrid is typically the locale for these plays): the cheeky chappy, the colourful anarchist who avoids making provocative comments, the idler, the scrounger, the flirt, the sententious old geezer. There usually aren't any educated characters; instead, popular folk wisdom is represented.

The género chico was always fiercely current: the actors make references (often in the songs, into which extra verses are added) to the outside world, with this "news" aspect of the play being even more important than the actual plot. There are mentions of politicians, external events and so forth, all as a way of connecting with an audience of humble culture. To this effect, the unity of what is going on in the play is broken, and the spectator is drawn in with the actors, without actually getting on stage.

The text is usually in prose, although some of the first plays alternate between parts in prose and in verse. Moreover, the language used is deliberately vulgar, with fashionable expressions and badly-pronounced foreign words and references. Jokes and other semantic aspects were not originally part of the sainete, but were subsequently incorporated by quinteros. The music was then justified by the text: people dancing in the street and suchlike. There is also theatre within theatre, as well as orchestra in the text. All these features aim fundamentally to create contact with the audience.

=== Music ===
There is disagreement regarding the relevance of the music itself. While some writers consider it always subordinate to the text in terms of importance, others such as Ramón Barce have theorised that the music comes first in the composition of the work; incoherent texts, called monstruos ("monsters"), merely gave the librettist a rhythm to which he must fit his words; these words were then often inexpertly fiddled with by the composer). In any case, the music does not usually correspond closely to the action, but rather is something in the background, sometimes coming in unexpectedly.

The musical part varies greatly in length, the plays with most music being Agua, azucarillos y aguardiente and La verbena de la paloma. Normally, the plays are preceded by a musical prelude, and occasionally have little intervals or music for dancing, and finish with a short finale in which the music from some previous scene is repeated. There are usually passages read over background music, in Singspiel style.

The music is familiar to the ear, popular and traditional, with popular or fashionable melodies of the time being taken and their lyrics changed. The aim is to have the ditty stick in the audience's mind after they leave the theatre. Furthermore, pronounced, popular rhythms are sought in the dance halls, generally imported but "nationalised", such as the chotis (from the German Schottisch, its ultimate origin being in Scotland), and many others, such as boleros, fandangos, or habaneras from Latin America, jotas, seguidillas, soleás, pasacalles, and waltzes, polkas, or mazurcas from Poland.

== See also ==
- Zarzuela
- Operetta
- Opera
- Culture of Spain
- Spain
- Category:Spanish-language operas
