= Antonio Rosales (composer) =

Spanish composer (circa 1740 – 1801)

- Born: c. 1740; Madrid, Spain
- Died: 1801 (aged 60–61); Madrid, Spain
- Occupation: Composer
- Employer: Royal Monastery of La Encarnación
- Notable work: El tío y la tía (1767); El licenciado Farfulla (1776)
- Style: Opera; zarzuela; tonadilla

Antonio Rosales (c. 1740, Madrid – 1801, Madrid) was a Spanish composer, known for his contributions to opera and other forms of Spanish theatre.

== Biography ==
Rosales composed the music to an important early zarzuela burlesca, the one-act El tío y la tía (lit. 'The uncle and the aunt'; 1767, staged at Teatro de la Cruz), which used a libretto by Ramón de la Cruz. His second zarzuela, El licenciado Farfulla (lit. 'The lawyer mumbles'; 1776, premiered at Teatro del Príncipe), also used a libretto by Cruz and was an immensely popular opera in Spain that was widely performed in that nation until 1813. Cruz also penned the libretti to many, but not all, of the approximately 150 tonadillas composed by Rosales. 149 of his tonadillas are held in the Biblioteca Municipal in Madrid.

Around 1787, Rosales succeeded Antonio Rodríguez de Hita as maestro de capilla at the Royal Monastery of La Encarnación.

He died in Madrid in 1801.

== See also ==
- Lists of composers
- List of Spanish musicians
- List of zarzuela composers
