= La Gran Vía =

La Gran Vía is a zarzuela in one act and five scenes with music by Federico Chueca and Joaquín Valverde Durán, and a libretto by Felipe Pérez y González. It premiered at the Teatro Felipe in Madrid, Spain on July 2, 1886. It is considered a masterpiece of the género chico genre of Spanish plays. The work achieved success beyond the Spanish speaking world, an unusual feat for works from this genre. It was successfully staged twice in Vienna; first at the Carltheater 1894, and that at the Danzers Orpheum in 1902. In Paris it was well received in a staging at L'Olympia. Harry Fragson used the zarzuela's score but wrote a new English language libretto to the work entitled Castles in Spain which was staged at the Royalty Theatre in London in 1906. The Teatro de la Zarzuela staged a revival of the work in 1998.

The work has eight numbers in popular dance forms of the time:

1. Introducción y polka de las calles
2. Vals del caballero de Gracia
3. Tango de la Menegilda
4. Jota de los ratas
5. Coro y mazurka de los marineritos
6. Schottisch del Elíseo Madrileño
7. Vals de la seguridad
8. Paso-doble de los sargentos

Several of these have been arranged for solo piano or guitar.

== External sources ==
- Brief description and synopsis of La Gran Vía on Zarzuela.net.
- La gran via scores on IMSLP.
