= Sociedad de Conciertos de Madrid =

The Sociedad de Conciertos de Madrid (English: Madrid Concert Society) was the first permanent symphony orchestra in Spain.

== History ==
The private Society was founded in 1866 by Francisco Asenjo Barbieri and Joaquín Gaztambide, who assumed responsibility for its organization and artistic direction. It was the heir of the orchestra formed by the Sociedad Artístico Musical de Socorros Mutuos which was based at the Teatro Real in Madrid.

Barbieri conducted the Orchestra during its inaugural season and was succeeded by Gatzambide in the following. The first musical director who served at length was Jesús de Monasterio, who was appointed in 1869 and remained until 1876. The Orchestra divided its activities between theatrical productions and symphonic concerts, and contributed to the spread of Wagernism and European symphonic music in Spain. It advanced the careers of new Spanish talents, such as Tomás Bretón, Joaquín Turina, Ruperto Chapí, and Isaac Albéniz.

In 1876, the conductorship passed to Mariano Vázquez Gómez, under whose guidance the Orchestra offered Spanish audiences the chance to hear the complete cycle of Beethoven's symphonies in their homeland for the first time.

On 27 February 1898, the Orchestra gave a performance Richard Strauss' symphonic poem Don Quixote at the Teatro Príncipe Alfonso on the Paseo de Recoletos, which was conducted by the composer himself. Other famous conductors who were invited to the Orchestra included Luigi Mancinelli and Jerónimo Giménez.

Due to a major economic crisis and irreconcilable disagreements between the section leaders of the Orchestra, the Society was dissolved in 1903. The majority of its members regrouped to form the Orquesta Sinfónica de Madrid, which has continued to play to the present day.

== Principal conductors ==
- Francisco Asenjo Barbieri 1866–1867
- Joaquín Gaztambide 1868–1869
- Jesús de Monasterio 1869–1876
- Mariano Vázquez Gómez 1876–1884
- Tomás Bretón 1885–1892
