= Josep Ribas =

Catalan composer

Josep Ribas (1882–1934) was a Catalan composer.

He is best remembered today for the Catalan-language sainet Pel teu amor 1922, of which the aria Rosó is one of the favoured songs of José Carreras.
