= Aragonaise =

In a musical context, an Aragonaise (literally a person or thing from Aragon, a region in Spain) is a "dance of Aragon". This is a driving triple metre dance which is traditionally accompanied by guitars, castanets and hand clapping.

There are two famous musical compositions named "Aragonaise", one by Jules Massenet from his opera Le Cid, the other from the entr'acte to act 4 of the opera Carmen by Georges Bizet.

== See also ==
- Jota (music)
