= Pedro Acerden =

Filipino zarzuela playwright

Pedro Acerden is a Filipino zarzuela playwright who writes in the Waray language.
