= Clementina (zarzuela) =

1787 zarzuela by Luigi Boccherini

- Zarzuela by Luigi Boccherini
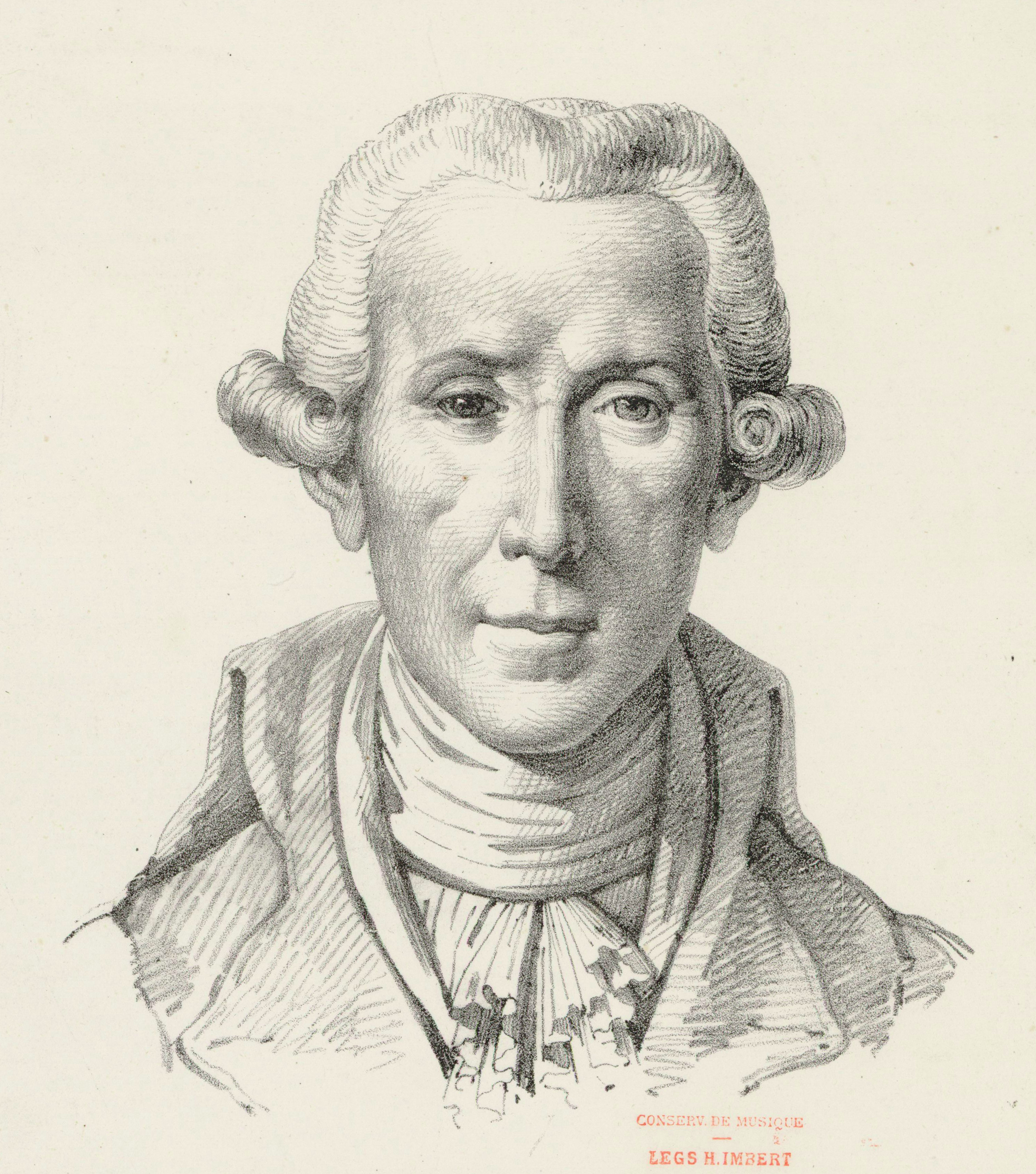
- Pencil drawing of Boccherini by Étienne Mazas after a portrait bust
- Librettist: Ramón de la Cruz
- Language: Spanish
- Premiere: 3 January 1787; Palace Puerta de la Vega, Madrid

Clementina, although wrongly and popularly known as La Clementina, (Note: It is common to mention the title as La Clementina, but this only originated in the Italian translations of this zarzuela (translations that came after Boccherini's composition). The original title of this work, as it was first created in Spain, is indeed Clementina and not La Clementina. See the official records in the Biblioteca Nacional de España) is a zarzuela in two acts by Luigi Boccherini. The Spanish-language libretto was by Ramón de la Cruz. It premiered on 3 January 1787 at the Palace Puerta de la Vega, Madrid.

Clementina is the only complete stage work by Boccherini. It was written when the zarzuela was close to the end of its period of greatest success, before this genre, at the beginning of the 19th century, was nearly forgotten in favour of the Italian opera. The librettist of Clementina, Ramón de la Cruz, had attempted to introduce innovations in the zarzuela, using folk elements instead of the more usual mythological subjects. The music is predominantly cheerful and turned towards comical sides, with pathetic fragments when it tries to describe unrequited love.

This work was written on commission of the Duchess Osuna-Benavente, a patron of the arts and lover of music who owned a private orchestra, under whose protection De La Cruz worked. Clementina premiered in Madrid in the palace of the countess, probably performed by amateur singers. Boccherini composed the music in less than one month. A further performance of Clementina took place in 1799, again in Madrid, in the Coliseo de los Caños del Peral, this time with very known artists: Catalina Tordesillas (Clementina), Manuela Monteis (Damiana), Joaquina Arteaga (Narcisa), Lorenza Correa (Cristeta), Vicente Sanchez (Don Urbano) and Manuel Garcia Parra (Don Lazzaro).

In modern times, Clementina was revived in Venice (La Fenice, 18 September 1951) in Munich (Cuvilliés Theatre, 1960) and in Aranjuez (Spain). A further performance was produced in Lucca in 2005. Opera Southwest is scheduled to give the American premiere in Albuquerque on 6 April 2025.

== Roles ==
Role	Voice type
Don Clemente, widowed and very rich gentleman	spoken role
Doña Clementina, supposed daughter of Don Clemente	soprano
Doña Narcisa, daughter of Don Clemente, younger than Clementina	soprano
Doña Damiana, tutor of Clementina and Narcisa	mezzo-soprano
Don Urbano, Portuguese gentleman, suitor of Clementina	tenor
Marquis de la Ballesta, suitor of Narcisa	spoken role
Don Lazzaro, music teacher	baritone
Cristeta, housemaid	soprano
A page	spoken role

== Synopsis ==
The daughters of Don Clemente, Clementina and Narcisa, are courted respectively by Don Urbano and by the marquis de la Ballesta, but they do not accept the marriage proposals of their suitors. Don Clemente reveals that Clementina is not his natural daughter, but was adopted when she was a little child. Gradually, Don Urbano realizes that Clementina is his sister, of whom he had lost all trace and for whom he has been in search for long time. The opera ends with the marriages between Don Urbano and Narcisa, the marquis and Clementina, Don Lazzaro and Cristeta.

== Orchestration and structure ==
Clementina is scored for the following instruments: 2 flutes, 2 oboes, 2 bassoons, 2 horns, strings.

Clementina includes the overture, 12 arias, 2 obbligato recitatives and 6 ensembles, plus the dialogues.

== Recordings ==
1958: Alfredo Simonetto, Milan RAI orchestra and chorus (Italian version), Cantus Classics (LC 03982) CACD 5.01226 F (2009)
Clementina: Fiorella Carmen Forti; Narcisa: Graziella Sciutti; Damiana: Angela Vercelli	Don Urbano: Juan Oncina; Don Lazzaro: Franco Calabrese; Cristeta: Vittoria Palombini
1965: Angelo Ephrikian, RSI orchestra and chorus, label Cat (Italian version), Nuova Era 223297
Clementina: Elena Rizzieri; Narcisa: Maria Grazia Ferracini; Damiana: Karla Schean	Don Urbano: Ugo Benelli; Don Lazzaro: Fernando Corena; Cristeta: Luciana Ticinelli
2008: Pablo Heras-Casado, La Compañia del Principe, Música Antigua Aranjuez MAA 008. New Musical Edition by Juan Pablo Fernández-Cortés.
Clementina: María Hinojosa; Narcisa: Sonia de Munck; Damiana: Marta Rodrigo	Don Urbano: David Alegret; Don Lazzaro: Toni Marsol; Cristeta: Elena Rivero

== Notes and references ==
Notes

Sources

- Coli, Remigio (2005). Luigi Boccherini. La vita e le opere (in Italian). Lucca: Maria Pacini Fazzi. ISBN 8872466792.
- Galleni Luisi, Leila (1969). "Boccherini, Luigi (Ridolfo Luigi)". Dizionario Biografico degli Italiani (in Italian). Vol. 11. Istituto dell'Enciclopedia Italiana.
- Marín, Miguel Ángel. "La zarzuela Clementina di Luigi Boccherini" (PDF) (in Italian). [Campus Virtual de la Universidad de La Rioja]. Archived from the original (PDF) on 23 September 2015.
