= La Dolores =

Spanish opera (ópera Española) in 3 acts by Tomás Bretón

- Opera by Tomás Bretón
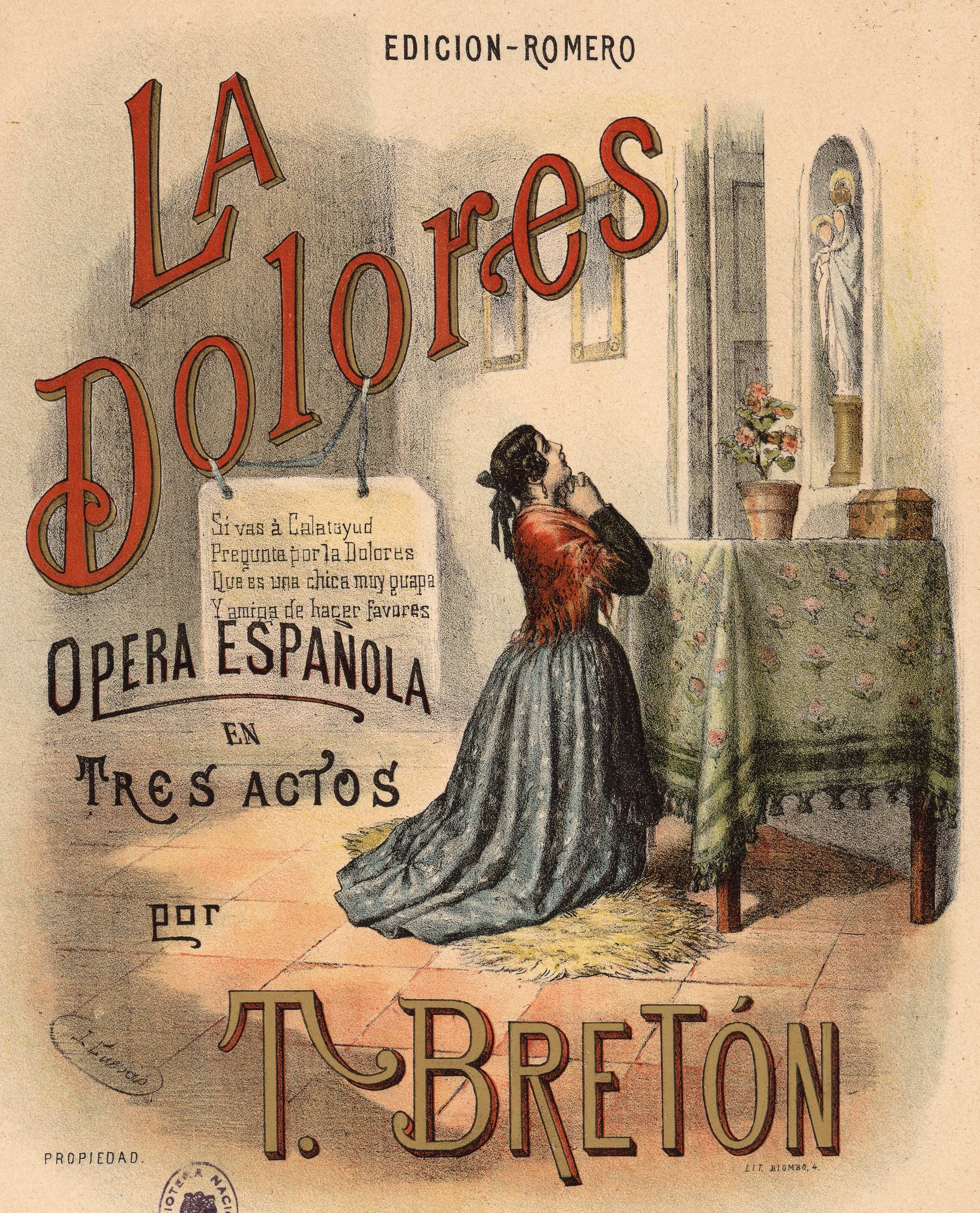
- First edition cover
- Librettist: Tomás Bretón
- Language: Spanish
- Based on: La Dolores by Josep Feliu i Codina
- Premiere: 16 March 1895; Teatro de la Zarzuela, Madrid

La Dolores is a Spanish opera (ópera Española) in 3 acts by Tomás Bretón. The libretto was arranged by composer himself from a same-name drama by Josep Feliu i Codina (1892). The opera was first performed at the Teatro de la Zarzuela in Madrid on 16 March 1895 and was an immediate success. The most famous piece from the opera is the grandiose jota from the finale of the first act.

== Composition and Performance History ==
For many years Bretón struggled to establish the genre of Spanish national opera. La Dolores is one of his nine operas, none of which remained in the standard repertoire. However, at the time of its composition it gained great success, having 53 consecutive performances in Madrid and another 103 in Barcelona.

In the Spanish edition the opera has a subtitle ópera Española, while in the Italian it is called a dramma lirico. It is dedicated to Anselmo González del Valle.

== Roles ==
| Role | Voice type | Cast at the Madrid premiere |
|---|---|---|
| Dolores, maid at Gaspara's inn | soprano | Avelina Corona |
| Gaspara, Lázaro's aunt, an innkeeper | mezzo-soprano | Castellanos |
| Lázaro, a seminarian, who is in love with Dolores | tenor | Lorenzo Simonetti |
| Celemín, a friend of Patricio | tenor | Alcántara |
| Melchor, a barber, former lover of Dolores | baritone | Mestres |
| Patricio, a rich man from Calatayud | baritone | Visconti |
| Rojas, an "exaggerated" sergeant | bass | Pepe Sigler |
| A mulateer | tenor | Vera |
Mixed chorus, boys' chorus

== Synopsis ==
The action is placed in 1830s, in Calatayud, a town in Aragón. The title character Dolores is a maid at an inn.

== Music ==
The prelude is based on the themes of the three protagonists: it opens with the jota about Dolores (Si vas a Calatayud), which is interrupted by Melchor's theme (from the duo in act 1) and the theme of Lázaro's love (from his duo with Dolores in act 2). Only then the jota is presented in its full form.

Apart from many recitatives and dialogues, there are major musical numbers.

- Act I:
  - Scene 1: Chorus. Trabaja, trabaja, que es fiesta mañana (mixed chorus)
  - Scene 1: Comic aria. ¡Salud, salud al noble pueblo de Calatayud! (Rojas with chorus)
  - Scene 2: Trio. Capaz un trono por ti (Dolores, Patricio, Rojas)
  - Scene 4: Duo. Saldar debes antes la deuda (Dolores, Melchor)
  - Scene 5: Pasacalle. En noches de verbena (chorus)
  - Scene 5: Jota. Aragón la más famosa (Celemín, a singer, chorus)
  - Scene 5: Soleá. Desde que al pueblo he llegao (Rojas)
  - Scene 5: Jota. Si vas a Calatayud (Melchor)
- Act II:
  - Prelude
  - Scene 2: Madrigal. ¡Qué hacer, Señor, en situación tan ruda! (Lázaro)
  - Scene 3: Scherzetto. Este pañuelo encarnado (Patricio)
  - Scene 4: Polo. Así que en el circo (Rojas with chorus)
  - Scene 7: ¡Dolores, si pequé! (Dolores, Melchor)
  - Scene 9: Duo. Un año dentro del alma (Dolores, Lázaro)
  - Scene 11: ¡Viva Patricio, viva, viva! (corrida; soloists and chorus)
- Act III:
  - Prelude
  - Scene 2: Duettino. Escucha y la calma mantén (Celemín, Lázaro)
  - Scene 5: Romance. Tarde sentí cuitada (Dolores)
  - Scene 6: Duo. Di que es verdad (Dolores, Lázaro)
  - Scene 6: Rondalla (off-stage; music from the finale of act I: instrumental jota and Si vas a Calatayud sung by Celemín)
  - Scene 7: Mi intento fue solo (Dolores, Melchor)

== Recordings ==
La Dolores is the only opera by Bretón to be recorded: Antoni Ros-Marbà's 1999 audio recording of Plácido Domingo in La Dolores for Decca won the Grammy Latino in September 2000. There is also a 2004 video recording, also by Ros-Marbà (though the soloists differ).
