= Luis Jordá =

Spanish musician, pianist and composer

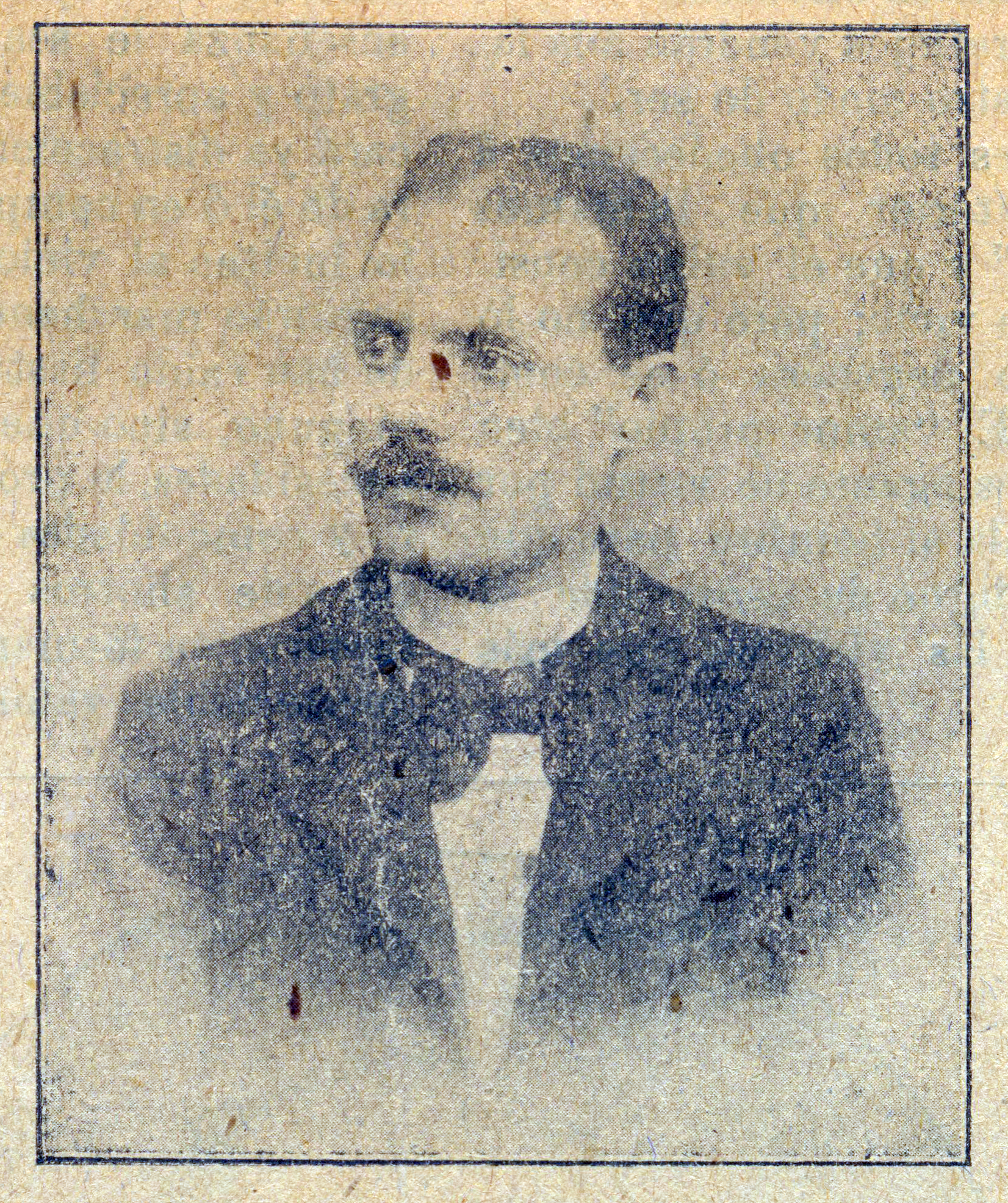
Luis G. Jordà.

Lluís Jordà, (Roda de Ter, 16 June 1869 – Barcelona, 20 September 1951) was a Spanish musician, pianist, composer and musical impresario from Catalonia.

== Biography ==
He was born Lluís Gonzaga Jordà i Rossell in Roda de Ter in Barcelona province. He first studied with Melitón Beaucells in Roda de Ter, and continued with Jaime Pujadas, choirmaster at Vic Cathedral. His family moved to Barcelona where he entered the conservatory where he obtained the highest qualifications under the instruction of professors Manuel Obiols and Josep Rodoreda. He studied organ in the Basilica de la Merced in Barcelona.

In 1889 he became professor-director of the Vic School of Music, and director of the city band. In 1898 he moved to Mexico where he became well known for his zarzuelas, especially Chin Chun Chan (1904) which achieved more than 2000 performances.

In 1915 he returned to Barcelona where he founded the musical establishment Casa Beethoven. In 1922-1934 he directed the "Trio Beethoven".

He composed zarzuelas, religious music and works for piano.

== Bibliography ==
- Cristian Canton Ferrer, Vida i obra de Luis G. Jordà (1869-1951). El músic de les Masies de Roda que va triomfar a Mèxic. Edición del Ayuntamiento de Masías de Roda, 2010. (The life and work of Luis G. Jordà, the musician from Roda de Ter who triumphed in Mexico: Roda de Ter, 2010)
