= Joaquín Valverde Sanjuán =

Spanish composer (1875–1918)

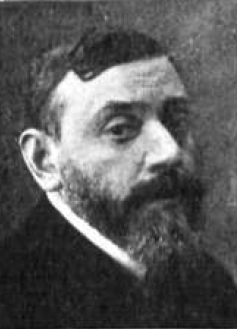
Photograph of the Spanish composer Quinito Valverde published in 1912 on the occasion of the premiere of his work El Príncipe Casto, written by Carlos Arniches and Enrique García Álvarez.

Joaquín "Quinito" Valverde Sanjuán (2 January 1875 – 4 November 1918) was a Spanish composer of zarzuelas. He was the son of Joaquín Valverde Durán, also a zarzuela composer, and was usually called Quinito Valverde to distinguish him from his father. In his day he was referred to as the "Tango King", the "Franz Lehár of Spanish music" and the "Spanish Offenbach", and his dance tunes were known internationally. Now he is perhaps best known for a short song called "Clavelitos" (Little Carnations), which has been recorded by many sopranos.

== Biography ==
Joaquín Valverde Sanjuán was born in Madrid on 2 January 1875, the son of Joaquín Valverde Durán. He studied at the Conservatory and under his father, and showed early promise, writing his first zarzuela Con las de Caín at the age of 15. He wrote some works alone (La mulata, La galerna o El mirlo blanco, Caretas y capuchones), but, like his father, his best work came in collaborations with other composers. These included Tomás López Torregrosa (Los puritanos, 1894); Los cocineros (1896); El pobre diablo, 1897; El primer reserva, 1897; Los chicos de la escuela, 1903; El terrible Pérez, 1903; El pobre Valbuena, 1904; El pudín negro de Stornoway, 1904, partly based on Sir Walter Scott's novel The Black Dwarf), Ramón Estellés (La marcha de Cádiz, 1896); Rafael Calleja (El iluso Cañizares, 1905); José Serrano (El perro chico, 1905; El iluso Cañizares, 1905; El pollo tejada, 1906; El amigo Melquíades, 1914; El príncipe carnaval, 1914); José Padilla (Los viejos Verdes, 1909); and others.

After his father's death in 1910, Quinito Valverde moved to Paris. He had great success there, and was also successful on Broadway in New York City, where A Night in Spain and The Land of Joy were staged in 1917-18. The Land of Joy was otherwise known as La Tierra de la Alegría. Every major English-language newspaper in New York published rave reviews. It included some American actors, whose purpose was to supply some English dialogue in an otherwise Spanish-language production. The central figure was the dancer Antonia Mercé y Luque, "La Argentina", who had appeared in Valverde revues in 1910 in Paris.

Quinito Valverde was also well known for a popular song called "Clavelitos" (Little Carnations) with words by José Juan Cadenas, which has been sung and recorded by performers as diverse as Conchita Supervía, Lucrezia Bori, Amelita Galli-Curci, Rosa Ponselle, Antonina Nezhdanova, María de los Ángeles Morales, Victoria de los Ángeles, and Florence Foster Jenkins.

He died in Mexico City on 4 November 1918 after an accident, while touring there. He was aged only 43.

== Sources ==
- zarzuela net: Joaquín “Quinito” Valverde Sanjuán
- galeon.com
- Biografias y Vidas
