= La dolorosa =

La Dolorosa (The Holy Virgin of the Sorrows) is a zarzuela by the Spanish composer José Serrano.

La Dolorosa was premiered at the Teatro Apolo in Valencia on 23 May 1930 with a text by J.J. Lorente. Before this, Serrano suffered the tragic loss of a child. His work hints at the grandeur that strengthens the pain.

== Plot summary ==
=== Act One ===
The first act introduces us to Rafael, a monk who recently arrived at a convent where he seeks to create his work of art: a painting of La Dolorosa that brings him so many rich memories that even the convent's Prior and Brother Lucas begin to notice and doubt the spiritual serenity of their new brother. The convent’s orchard turns out to be an ideal place for the inspiration Rafael seeks. Perico, his helper, wants to learn to paint and begs Rafael to explain the painting to him; he consents, singing a painful love song.

In the next scene, Perico stands alone trying to copy his teacher. Nicasia arrives and declares her love openly. Perico does not want to lose the girl, nor fall under her spell, but she ends up yielding to his amorous desires. As they celebrate their love, the dance is interrupted by Bienvenido, the girl’s father, who forbids his daughter from entering a relationship. José, Perico’s father, tries to keep the peace, and everyone ends up acquiescing to the young couple’s desires.

During the afternoon, Jose arrives at the convent asking for help for a woman who he found carrying a very small child in her arms. Upon seeing them, Perico recognizes in them the features of La Dolorosa that Rafael is painting. When he arrives later to administer medications, he learns from the woman that another man had loved her.

=== Act Two ===
The second act continues to follow the two couples. Nicasia and Perico are eagerly preparing for their wedding. Meanwhile, Rafael and Dolores find themselves alone with a free moment to explain themselves. Dolores, who had left Rafael for another man, has been left in turn and is living unhappily with the consequences of her choices. Rafael, for his part, is confused about his feelings toward Dolores and his spiritual obligations.

The scene moves to the interior of the convent. It is the hour for matins and the prior is pondering Rafael's situation when he hears the song of a group of minstrels singing outside. Since Rafael still has not appeared in the chapel, the prior goes in search of him, and upon finding him, Rafael begs for confession and reveals his feelings: he doesn't want to leave Dolores alone in the world.

The final scene is the joyous wedding of Nicasia and Perico. Rafael, having obtained permission from the prior to leave the convent and renounce his oaths, is with Dolores as the two reconciled lovers sing of their joy.
