= Emilio Serrano y Ruiz =

Spanish pianist and composer

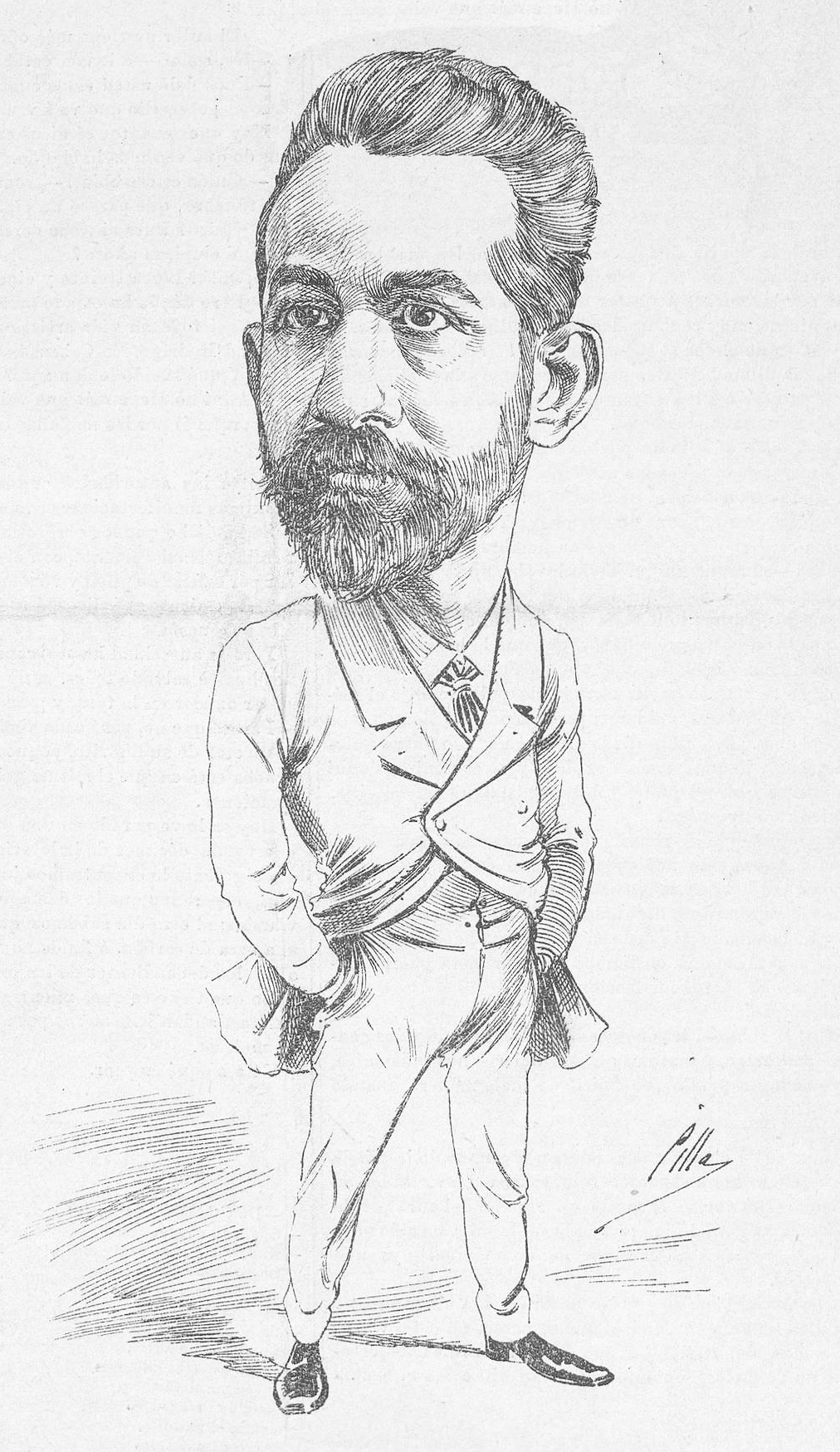
1891-04-11, Madrid Cómico, Emilio Serrano, Cilla

Emilio Serrano y Ruiz (13 March 1850 – 8 April 1939) was a Spanish pianist and composer.

== Life ==
Born in Vitoria, Serrano spent his early youth in Madrid and received his musical training at the Madrid Conservatory, where he studied piano with Dámaso Zabalza, and harmony and composition with Emilio Arrieta. He himself soon began to teach and he joined the faculty after graduation. In 1894, he succeeded the late Emilio Arrieta as the chair of composition, which he held until 1920. Besides teaching, he was a productive composer and served in many official capacities in the musical life of the Spanish Metropole. Most notably, he gave excellent performances as a pianist in chamber music concerts at the Spanish court and also directed the Teatro Real for some time, making him one of the most prominent faces of the music scene in Madrid. He died in Madrid aged 89.

Serrano was a well-rounded composer, who besides writing operas and zarzuelas, also left behind symphonies, chamber music, and works for piano. He stood completely within the Spanish musical tradition of his time and was a confirmed representative of the Spanish national opera.

== Selected works ==
=== Operas ===
- Mitridates
- Giovanna la pazza (Juana la loca), opera in four acts, premiered 1890 at the Teatro Real, Madrid
- Irene de Ortranto
- Gonzalo de Córdoba
- La maja de rumbo

=== Zarzuelas ===
- Various juvenilia
- La Bejarana

=== Other ===
- Symphony in E♭ major
- La primera salida de Don Quijote, symphonic poem
- String quartet in D minor
- Canciones del hogar, for voice and orchestra
