= Joaquín Valverde Durán =

Spanish composer, conductor and flautist

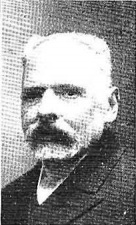
Joaquín Valverde, de Kaulak

Joaquín Valverde Durán (27 February 1846 in Badajoz – 17 March 1910 in Madrid) was a Spanish composer, conductor and flautist. As a composer he is known for his collaborations on zarzuelas (he has been described as "the collaborative musician par excellence"). He was also the father of Joaquín "Quinito" Valverde Sanjuán, who achieved a greater level of fame.

He studied at the Madrid Conservatory under José Aranguren (harmony), Pedro Sarmiento (flute) and Emilio Arrieta (composition). He was a brilliant flautist, playing in military bands and theatre orchestras from the age of 13, and winning first prize in flute at the Conservatory in 1867. He won the composition prize in 1870. He wrote two manuals for flautists (1874; La flauta: su historia, su estudia, 1886). Between 1871 and 1889 he was a professional theatre conductor.

His first symphony Batylo was written in 1871. His reputation as a composer was made, however, with a series of zarzuelas (light operas), written in collaboration with Federico Chueca. It appears that Chueca provided most of the melodies and Valverde provided the orchestral polish. They worked together on Un maestro de obra prima (1877), La Canción de la Lola (1880), Luces y sombras and Fiesta Nacional (both 1882), Cádiz (1886), El año pasado por agua (1889), and other operas. Their masterpiece was La gran vía (Madrid, 2 July 1886), which was played in Spain, Mexico, Argentina, New York, Vienna, and many other theatres in Europe. It was premiered in London in 1906 as Castles in Spain.

A march from Cádiz (originally a hymn to a general, written in 1868 by Chueca alone) proved enormously popular in Spain, and it competed for popularity with the national anthem among the military. Both Valverde and Chueca were awarded the Military Grand Cross.

Valverde also collaborated with Manuel Fernández Caballero, Julián Romea, Ruperto Chapí, Arturo Saco del Valle, José Rogel, Tomás Bretón, Tomás López Torregrosa and José Serrano (La suerte loca, 1907). Less successful were operas Valverde wrote alone, such as La baraja francesa (1890).

His other works include two symphonies and over 200 other orchestral works.

His son "Quinito" Valverde (Joaquín Valverde Sanjuán) carried on his father's tradition.

== Sources ==
- Grove's Dictionary of Music and Musicians, 5th ed., 1954, Eric Blom, ed.
