= Gerónimo Giménez =

Spanish conductor and composer

Gerónimo Giménez y Bellido (10 October 1854 – 19 February 1923) was a Spanish conductor and composer, who dedicated his career to writing zarzuelas, such as La tempranica and La boda de Luis Alonso. He preferred to spell his first name with a "G", even though his name at birth officially began with a "J".

Written in Spanish, a very comprehensive biographical exposition by Ascensión García de las Mozas may be found at the Universidad de Cádiz institutional repository of Research and Learning Objects (RODIN).

== Career ==
Giménez was born in Seville. A son of the Granada musician José María Giménez and his wife Antonia Bellido, he moved with his family to the city of Cadiz, where he soon became a choirboy. Although the details of his early years are not entirely certain, Giménez spent his childhood and adolescence in Cádiz. A child prodigy, he began music lessons with his father and continued his education with Salvador Viniegra. By the age of 12, he was already playing among the first violins of the Teatro Principal orchestra in Cádiz. Five years later, he became the director of an opera and zarzuela company, making his debut in Gibraltar with a production of Giovanni Pacini's Safo.

A scholarship permitted Giménez to enrol at the Conservatoire de Paris in June 1874, where he studied violin with Jean-Delphin Alard and composition with Ambroise Thomas. He received first prizes for harmony and counterpoint. After graduation, he traveled to Italy and then returned to Spain, settling in Madrid. In 1885, he was appointed director of Teatro Apolo de Madrid and shortly afterwards of the Teatro de la Zarzuela.

Ruperto Chapí commissioned him to write the openings to his zarzuelas El milagro de la Virgen and La bruja. As a conductor of the Sociedad de Conciertos de Madrid, Giménez helped cultivate the tastes of audiences in Madrid for symphonic music. According to "those who have seem him conduct [and] have transmitted to us the memory of his performances of great strength and great enthusiasm […] he obtained with imperceptible gestures what he wanted from the orchestra."

A prolific composer, Giménez also collaborated with the leading authors of sainetes (a comic genre found in Spanish theatre), including Ricardo de la Vega, Carlos Arniches, the brothers Serafín and Joaquín Álvarez Quintero, and Javier de Burgos, to obtain the libretti for his zarzuelas. He co-wrote the music of a number of his works with Amadeo Vives, who hailed him the "musician of elegance" because of his sense of rhythm and easy melodies.

In 1896, Giménez wrote El mundo comedia es, subtitled El baile de Luis Alonso, based on a text by Javier de Burgos. Following the success of this piece, he set to music another sainete by Burgos with the same characters, which became one of his most famous works: La boda de Luis Alonso, subtitled La noche del encierro (1897). This second work, which achieved much greater success than the first, was actually meant to be a prequel, not a sequel.

La tempranica was perhaps his most ambitious and successful work. Presented at the Teatro de la Zarzuela on 19 September 1900, it followed a text by Julián Romea. Giménez skillfully managed to combine moments of intense lyricism with scenes of colloquial explosion in a zarzuela which, according to Carlos Gómez Amat, "had all the qualities of the genre and none of the faults". The influence of Giménez is often noticeable in the compositions of subsequent Spanish composers such as Joaquín Turina and Manuel de Falla (especially the stylistic correspondences between La tempranica and the latter's opera La vida breve). Federico Moreno Torroba adapted the celebrated zarzuela into an opera by setting the spoken parts to music. In 1939, Joaquín Rodrigo also paid his respects with a Homenaje a la tempranica, which contained a solo part for castanets.

Beyond dramatic works for the stage, Giménez also wrote three cadenzas to Beethoven's Violin Concerto.

Towards the end of his life, Giménez lived in a precarious economic situation, which was made worse by the Madrid Conservatory's refusal to grant him a professorship in chamber music. He died in Madrid aged 68.
