= Jota (music) =

Spanish music genre and dance

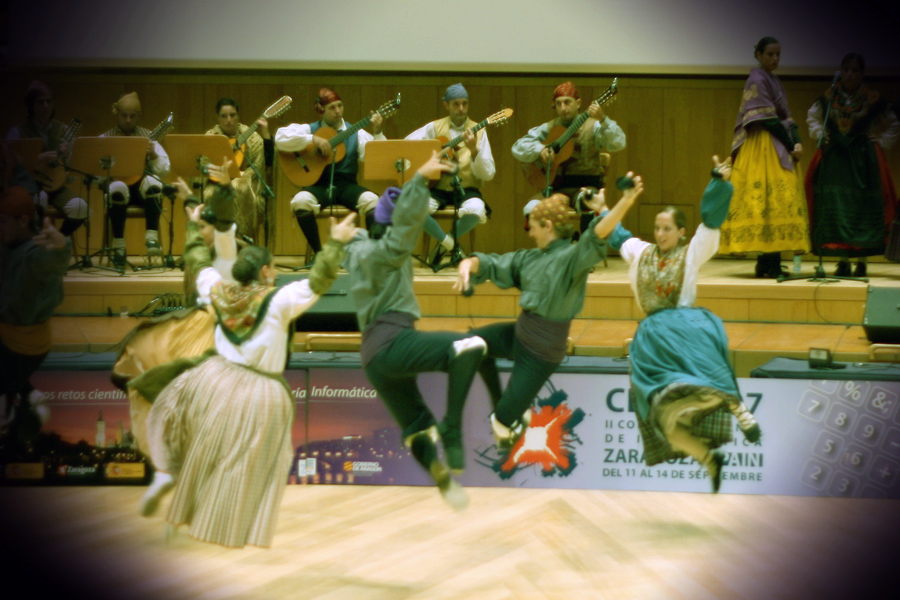
Aragonese jota dancers

The jota (pronounced [ˈxota]) is a genre of music and the associated dance known throughout Spain, most likely originating in either Aragon or the Valencian Community. It varies by region, having a characteristic form in Aragon (where it is the most important), Mallorca, Catalonia, León, Castile, Navarre, Cantabria, Asturias, Galicia, La Rioja, Murcia and Eastern Andalusia. Being a visual representation, the jota is danced and sung accompanied by castanets, and the interpreters tend to wear regional costumes. In Valencia, the jota was once danced during interment ceremonies.

The jota tends to have a 3/4 rhythm, although some authors maintain that the 6/8 is better adapted to the poetic and choreographic structure. For their interpretation, guitars, bandurrias, lutes, dulzaina, and drums are used in the Castilian style, while the Galicians use bagpipes, drums, and bombos. Theatrical versions are sung and danced with regional costumes and castanets, though such things are not used when dancing the jota in less formal settings. The content of the songs is quite diverse, from patriotism to religion to sexual exploits. In addition to this, the songs also have the effect of helping to generate a sense of local identity and cohesion.

The steps have an appearance not unlike that of the waltz, though in the case of the jota, there is much more variation. Furthermore, the lyrics tend to be written in eight-syllable quartets, with assonance in the first and third verses.

== Etymology ==
The medieval word "xiota" (pronounced [ˈʃota] or [ˈʃɔta]), derives from Mozarabic šáwta "jump", ultimately from Latin saltāre "to jump". Due to phonetic changes, it has become jota (pronounced [ˈxota]) in modern Spanish (reborrowed to Valencian as jota [ˈxota], or cota [ˈkɔta]) and hotia (pron. [ˈxota]) or ixota (pron. [iˈʃota]) in Aragonese; Valencian: [ˈxota]; Asturian: xota [ˈʃota]; Galician: xota [ˈʃɔtɐ].

== Aragonese jota ==
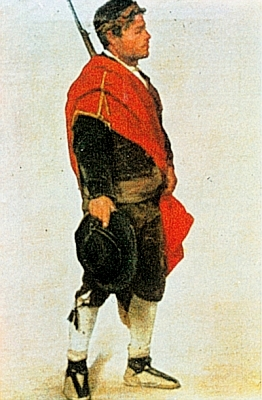
Aragonese jota singer Pedro Nadal, known as El Royo del Rabal ("The Redhead from the Peasant's Quarter"), as painted in 1881 by Carlos Larraz

External videos
- Jota de Guara, Aragonese jota exhibition (Huesca, 2018)

The Aragonese jota is the best-known expression of Aragonese folklore. It dates as far back as the 18th century, and reached the pinnacle of its splendor in the 19th century. Due to the complexities of the dance steps and manner of singing, the jota has evolved. Since the end of the 19th century, heavily choreographed versions have often been made for zarzuelas, movies, contests, festivals, and other entertainments. The most pure forms of the jota can still be found in Calanda, Alcañiz, Andorra, Albalate, and Zaragoza.

Nowadays there exist many modern varieties of the jota which are performed by various folkloric groups. Among the most popular can be found: Jota de San Lorenzo (Huesca), Jota Vieja, Aragón Tierra Bravía, Gigantes y Cabezudos, La Dolores (these two are taken from the zarzuela and opera respectively of the same names), and the danza de la Olivera.

== Castilian jota ==
As noted earlier, the jota of Castile tends to be accompanied by guitars, bandurrias, lutes, dulzaina and drums. As the music plays, the dancers dance with hands atop their heads, accompanied at times by castanets. The jota of Castile has a more sober, less airy feel to it, while the steps are quicker and sharper than what is seen in the Aragonese version. The songs accompanying the jota, which are known for their wry humor, typically deal with life, love, weddings, (often giving advice to the newlyweds) or religion.

== Philippine jota ==
The Philippine jota was among the most popular dances during the Spanish colonial period in the Philippines and up to the early 20th century. It was originally performed in social gatherings (like weddings, parties and baptisms) during the Spanish period in the Philippines. The Filipinos adapted this lively and delightful dance with different versions. These versions are combinations of Spanish and Filipino dance steps and music. Notable differences between the Philippine and Spanish jotas are the use of unstrung bamboo castanets. The jota is accompanied by the Philippine rondalla often consisting of a bandurria, guitar, bass and other mandolin-type instruments.

Variations of jotas differ from region to region. One such example is Jota Paragua. The Jota Paragua came from Palawan’s old capital, the Cuyo Islands, which displays a heavy Castilian influence. The zapateados (footwork), cubrados (curved arms), and Sevillana (flounced and ruffled) styles of dress are evidently Spanish in origin. The ladies wave their mantón, or decorative shawl, while the gentlemen keep a brisk pace with bamboo castanets. The music is an alternating fast and slow tempo similar to Spanish airs which accompany dances like flamenco, jota, bolero, seguidilla, and fandango.

Other examples of Philippine jotas are Jota Manileña from Manila, Jota Caviteña from Cavite and Jota Moncadeña from Tarlac.

== In California ==
The jota first came to Alta California during the Spanish period and was an important part of dance repertoires among Californios. Later, the renowned guitarist Manuel Y. Ferrer, who was born in Baja California to Spanish parents and learned guitar from a Franciscan friar in Santa Barbara but made his career in the San Francisco Bay Area, arranged jotas for the guitar. During the early 20th century, the jota became part of the repertoire of Italian American musicians in San Francisco playing in the ballo liscio style. Two jotas collected by Sidney Robertson Cowell for the WPA California Folk Music Project in 1939 were played by bands of different national origins: one was Mexican American, the other Portuguese American.

== Composers ==
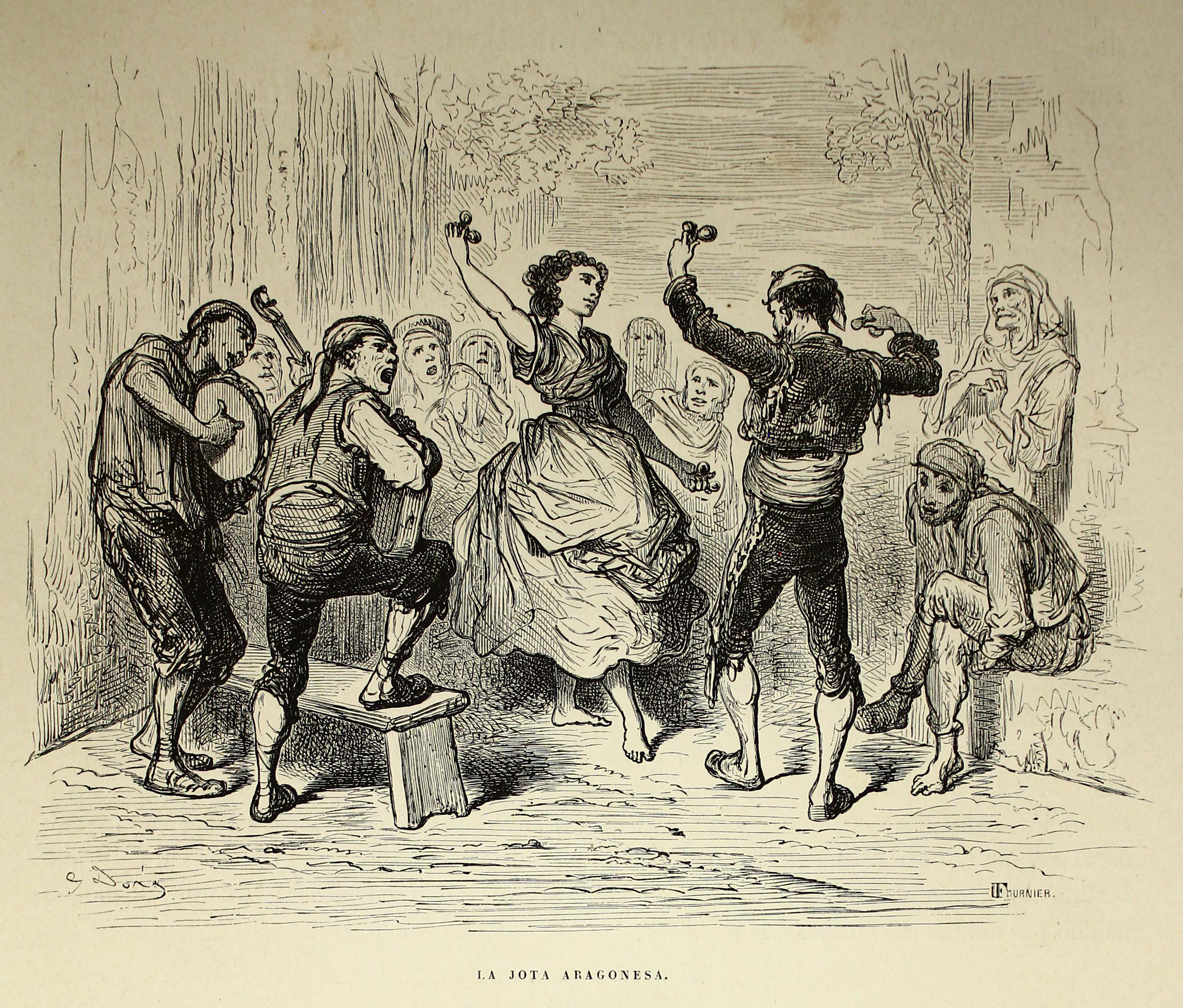
La jota aragonesa, 1874 engraving

Some composers, both Spanish and non-Spanish, have made use of the jota in various works:

- Isaac Albéniz, Spanish composer (1860–1909), wrote a jota for piano.
- Georges Bizet, French composer (1838–1875), composed the opera Carmen, which is set in Spain. The entr'acte to the fourth act (Aragonaise) is a jota.
- Manuel de Falla, Spanish composer (1876–1946), includes a jota in his ballet The Three-Cornered Hat as well as in his "7 Canciones populares espanolas" (No. 4)
- Mikhail Glinka, Russian composer (1804–1857), after traveling through Spain, used a style derived from the jota in his work The Aragonese Jota.
- Louis Gottschalk, American composer and pianist (1829–1869), composed the piano work La Jota Aragonesa, Op.14.
- Raoul Laparra, French composer (1876–1943), composed an opera entitled La jota.
- Franz Liszt, Hungarian pianist and composer (1811–1886), wrote a jota for piano. His Spanish Rhapsody for piano contains a Jota aragonese.
- Frederick Loewe, American composer (1901–1988), uses a jota as the last (orchestral) part of "The Rain in Spain" from My Fair Lady. (Note: The last part of Loewe's "The Rain in Spain" is explicitly titled "Jota" in the score.)
- Santiago de Murcia, Spanish composer (1673–1739), composed Jota.
- Maurice Ravel, French composer (1875-1937), used the jota as a model for "Chanson à boire", the final song in his cycle Don Quichotte à Dulcinée.
- Alfred Reed, American composer (1921–2005), composed El Camino Real for concert band which begins with a jota.
- Camille Saint-Saëns, French composer (1835–1921), composed an orchestral Jota Aragonesa (his Op. 64) to the same tune used by Glinka, Gottschalk, & Liszt, as well as a virtuosic dance, "Introduction and Rondo Capriccioso", for violin and orchestra.
- Pablo de Sarasate, Spanish composer (1844–1908), composed a Jota navarra as part of his Spanish Dances.
- Francisco Tarrega, Spanish composer (1852–1909), composed Gran Jota for classical guitar.
