= Manuel Fernández Caballero =

Spanish composer (1835–1906)

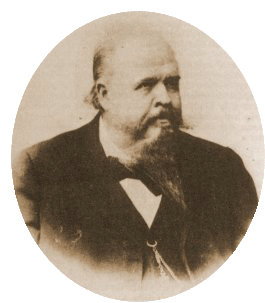
Manuel Fernández Caballero

Manuel Fernández Caballero (Murcia, 14 March 1835 – Madrid, 26 February 1906) was a Spanish composer, notably of zarzuelas.

His works were seminal works in the young Género chico form of zarzuela. The success of Los bandos de villafrita (1884) consolidated his career. Its sequel was Las grandes figuras (1885). The sainete El dúo de La Africana and its celebrated jota No cantes más La Africana remain as classic examples of a zarzuela duet.

== Works ==
He also composed religious works and salon songs. He was one of the most successful Spanish composers of the nineteenth century, and enjoyed many successful premieres, from his earlier pieces Entre el alcalde y el rey, Los bandos de Villa-Frita and El lucero del alba, composed for the Cádiz singer Antonia Garcia de Videgain, to the most successful of all his works, Gigantes y cabezudos (1898).

=== Zarzuelas ===
- Entre el alcalde y el rey (1875)
- La Marsellesa (1876)
- es:Los sobrinos del Capitán Grant (1877)
- es:El lucero del alba (1879)
- Currilla (1883).
- Chateau Margaux (1887)
- es:El dúo de La africana (1893)
- es:El cabo primero (1895)
- es:La viejecita (1897)
- Gigantes y Cabezudos (1898)
