= José Castel =

Spanish composer (1737–1807)

José Castel (1737 in Tudela, Navarre – 1807) was a Spanish composer.

José Castel was a church musician in his native Tudela and Aragon before moving to Madrid around 1760. There, in addition to his church duties, he was active as a theatrical composer, for the Teatro del Príncipe, as well as a printer and publisher. Castel was well paid for his music, for example he received 360 reales for the music for the comedy El Faetón.

In 1773 he moved back to Tudela, as maestro de capilla at the Colegiata de Santa Maria, yet he continued, circa 1774–1782, to still be based in Madrid and spend more time on theatrical activities. In 1797, following the death of his wife, he was ordained a priest, dying on Sept. 2nd 1807 and being buried in Tudela Cathedral.

He was particularly regarded for his tonadillas.

== Selected recordings ==
- La fontana del placer. Zarzuela in two acts. Compañía Teatro del Príncipe, dir. Pablo Heras-Casado. Música Antigua Aranjuez MAA 007 (77:00) Literary research, transcription and musical edition: Juan Pablo Fernández-Cortés
