= Tomás Bretón =

Spanish conductor and composer (1850–1923)

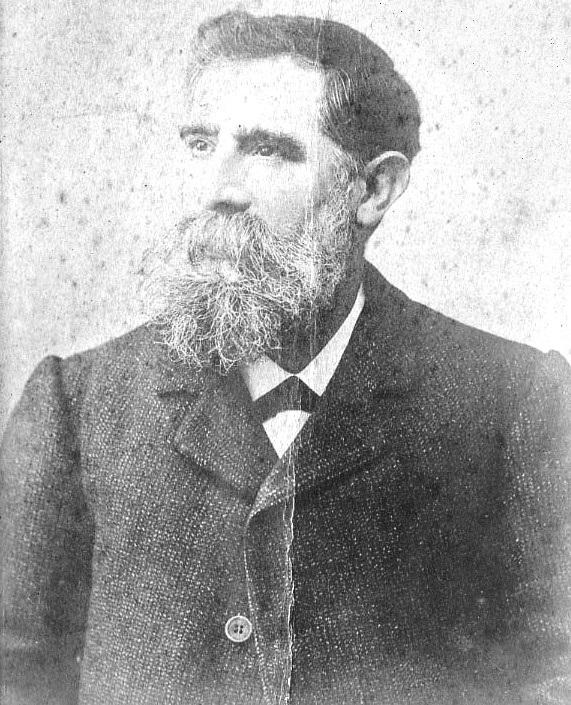
- Born: Tomás Bretón y Hernández; 29 December 1850; Salamanca, Spain
- Died: 2 December 1923 (aged 72); Madrid, Spain
- Occupation: Composer

Tomás Bretón y Hernández (29 December 1850 – 2 December 1923) was a Spanish conductor and composer.

== Biography ==
Tomás Bretón was born in Salamanca. He completed his musical studies at the School of Fine Arts in his home town, where he earned his living playing the violin in small provincial orchestras, theaters and churches. At age 16, he moved to Madrid, where he played the violin in orchestras in zarzuela theatres. He also began his studies of the violin and piano at the Royal Conservatory under Emilio Arrieta. In 1872, Bretón received the first prize for composition at the Conservatory, together with Ruperto Chapi. After having worked in small theaters for several years, in 1882 he received a grant from the Academy of Fine Arts of San Fernando which enabled him to study in Rome, Milan, Vienna and Paris between 1881 and 1884. There, he found time to work on more ambitious works, such the oratorio El Apocalipsis and the opera Los amantes de Teruel. The premiere of this last work at the Teatro Real de Madrid cemented his name as one of the major composers of Spanish opera.

Briton was also very active as a conductor, first in the Unión Artistical Musical (1878–81), which he founded, and later in Madrid Concert Society, where he served as principal conductor between 1885 and 1891. In that capacity, he founded a series of concerts where both Spanish music and international novelties were played. In 1892, Francisco Tárrega dedicated his piece Capricho Árabe to him during his visit in Algiers, Algeria. In 1901, he became director of the Conservatory of Madrid, a position he held until his retirement in 1921, struggling to modernize teaching at the institution and broaden its international orientation. He died in Madrid in 1923, aged 72 years.

== Work ==
Bretón gained renown as a result of the success of his zarzuela La verbena de la Paloma, although other were well-received works, included his operas Los amantes de Teruel, based on the eponymous legend, and La Dolores. After his death, his extensive output was generally forgotten. His career spanned the majority of the musical areas of the period of the Restoration (1875–1923): Conservatorium Director, reputed orchestral conductor, composer of operas, zarzuelas, symphonic and chamber music.

=== Opera ===
He aimed to create a Spanish opera, which would form a basis for a national music. He not only expressed these ideas in his many writings, but also through a series of works he composed throughout his career, from Guzmán el bueno (1876) to Tabaré (1913). His series of nine operas, two of them in only one act, are an ambitious body of work for Spanish composers of his time. After a long polemic which delayed its première, Los amantes de Teruel (1889) amounted to its definitive consolidation, and was followed by proposals along very different lines, such as the Wagnerian in Garín (1892) for the Barcelona Liceu and the veristic in La Dolores (1894) for the Madrilenian Teatro de la Zarzuela. His last works, despite being tied to a strong nineteenth-century tradition, contain undeniable interest, such as Raquel (1900), based on the famous romantic drama, Farinelli (1902), composed for the failed Teatro Lírico project, Tabaré (1913), set in America, and Don Gil de las calzas verdes (1914), based on a comedy by Tirso de Molina.

=== Zarzuela ===
At the same time, he approached the art zarzuela with unequal success. His output, while less than that of his contemporaries Ruperto Chapí, Gerónimo Giménez and Manuel Fernández Caballero, is of great quality, given the variety of genres which he tackled. He made several attempts at composing in the zarzuela grande genre, both in a more traditional line than previous generations in works such Cuatro sacristanes (1874), ¡A los toros! (1876), ¡Bonito país! (1877), El campanero de Begoña (1878) and Los amores de un príncipe (1881), and at the end of the century in the Circo de Parish, with El clavel rojo (1899) and Covadonga (1901), where he adopted more modern procedures, within the limitations of the genre. His greatest fame came from the género chico, especially La verbena de la Paloma (1894), one of the most famous zarzuelas of the Spanish repertoire, the most spectacular works view in Buenos Aires, although he later composed many others which were not as successful.

=== Orchestral output ===
On the other hand, he wrote symphonic music with a singular insistence, at a time in which in Spain, orchestral ensembles barely existed. He composed and conducted numerous works for the Sociedad de Conciertos, of which he was chief conductor from 1885 to 1890. A result of this were his three symphonies (1872, 1883, 1905), revealing a strong assimilation of Beethoven's compositional techniques. His most successful works were those with a Spanish character, albeit in an Alhambristic vein –such as En la Alhambra (1887)– or a more danceable one, as in Escenas andaluzas (1894). During his last years he composes various symphonic poems with a clear, nostalgic character, such as Los galeotes (1905) based on the famous Quixote episode, and Salamanca (1916) on popular themes from his native region. In the chamber-music genre he has left us various works, including three quartets (one of which is published), as well as a trio and quintet, composed from markedly classical standpoints, influenced by the French world of Saint-Saëns. His wide musical knowledge led him to tackle many other fields such as song, including a song-cycle based on Gustavo Adolfo Bécquer's rhymes (1886), which was followed by Las golondrinas, and the oratorio El Apocalipsis (1882) composed in Rome as one of the works written under the academy scholarship requirements.

The prolific composer for the guitar Francisco Tárrega dedicated one of his greatest masterpieces, "Capricho Árabe", to Tomás Bretón.

== Selected works ==
- Symphony No. 1 in F major (1873)
- Guzmán el bueno, opera (1876)
- El campanero de Begoña, zarzuela (1878)
- Los amores de un príncipe, zarzuela (1881)
- El Apocalipsis, oratorio (1882)
- Symphony No. 2 in E-flat major (1883)
- Piano Trio in E minor (1887)
- En la Alhambra, symphonic serenade (1887)
- Las golondrinas, song cycle (1887)
- Los amantes de Teruel, opera (1889)
- Garín, opera (1892)
- Escenas andaluzas, orchestral suite (1894)
- La Dolores, opera (1894)
- La verbena de la Paloma, zarzuela (1894)
- Raquel, opera (1900)
- El clavel rojo, zarzuela (1899)
- Covadonga, zarzuela (1901)
- Symphony No. 3 in G major (1905), arranged from a lost piano quintet (1904)
- Los galeotes, symphonic poem after Cervantes (1905)
- Violin Concerto in A minor, dedicated to the memory of Pablo de Sarasate (1909; orchestration lost; reconstructed by Rogelio Groba)
- Tabaré, Opera (1913)
- Don Gil de las calzas verdes, opera (1914)
- Salamanca, symphonic poem (1916)
