= Luis Misón =

Spanish composer (c.1727–1776)

Luis Misón (c. 26 August 1727 – 13 February 1776) was a Spanish composer. Born in Mataró, Barcelona, he composed over 100 tonadillas, including Una mesonera y un arriero ("The Hand Maiden and the Hunter", c. 1757), which contains the song "Seguidilla dolorosa de una enamorada" ("Painful song of a girl in love", Los ciegos (1758), and El maestro de baile (1761).
