= Sainete =

Theatrical genre

A sainete (farce or titbit) was a popular Spanish comic opera piece, a one-act dramatic vignette, with music. It was often placed at the end of entertainments, or between other types of performance. It was vernacular in style, and used scenes of low life. Active from the 18th to 20th centuries, it superseded the entremés. Among its most prolific composers were Ramón de la Cruz and Antonio Soler.

The genre, known as the sainet was also found in Catalonia, with composers such as Josep Ribas contributing Catalan-language sainets.

Sainetes began to be developed into zarzuelas in Cuba around 1850.

== See also ==
- Cuban musical theatre
