= Federico Chueca =

Spanish composer (1846–1908)

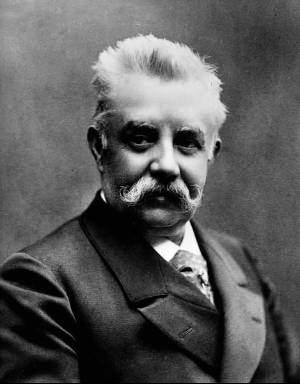
Federico Chueca

Pío Estanislao Federico Chueca y Robres (5 May 1846 – 20 June 1908) was a Spanish composer of zarzuelas and author of La gran vía along with Joaquín Valverde Durán in 1886. He was one of the most prominent figures of the género chico.

== Career ==
Born in Madrid, Chueca entered the conservatory at eight years old, but his family later obligated him to abandon music to study medicine. He was arrested in 1866 as a participant in the student demonstrations against the Narváez government. While he spent three days in the prison of San Francisco in Madrid, he composed several waltzes that he entitled Lamentos de un preso ("Lamentations of a Prisoner"). Later, Francisco Asenjo Barbieri helped orchestrate and direct the works, and their success helped Chueca leave medicine and devote himself once more to music.

He worked as a pianist and directed the orchestra of the Teatro Variedades. He is considered a self-taught musician. In fact, he was more schooled in the sciences than in music, however Chueca had an intuitive talent and grace with melody and rhythm that produced many works. He worked with several collaborators like Barbieri, Tomás Bretón, and especially Valverde, in many of his works.

== Works ==
Among the many zarzuelas that Chueca wrote, some of the most notable are:

- La canción de la Lola (1880)
- La Gran Vía (1886)
- Cádiz (1886)
- El año pasado por agua (1889)
- El chaleco blanco (1890)

*Agua, azucarillos y aguardiente (1897)

- La alegría de la huerta (1900)

*El bateo (1901)

Synopses:

“Agua, azucarillos y aguardiente!” - “Water, sweeties and aguardiente!” was a typical cry heard in the streets of Madrid in the late 19th century, as the vendors advertised their wares. The action of this Zarzuela focusses on the middle and lower classes in Madrid as they prepare for the San Lorenzo celebrations in August. The chorus includes all kinds of street vendors, soldiers, nannies and organ grinders.

The story: The poor but ambitious Asia, and her mother, Doña Simona, have recently moved to Madrid from Valdepatata (potato valley!), but are unable to pay their rent. They tell their landlord, Don Aquilino, that they'll pay him with money they intend to borrow from Asia's boyfriend, Serafín, the son of a rich senator. The landlord is amused at this idea, since he has recently had to lend money to Serafín.

Pepa, a stall-holder who also owes rent to Don Aquilino, has been offered money by Serafín to put a sleeping tablet in Doña Simona's drink the next time she accompanies him and her daughter on their daily walk. His intention is to seduce Asia without her mother's permission.

When Pepa's boyfriend Lorenzo finds out, he persuades her that it's a great idea, talks to Serafín himself and doubles the payment, keeping half for himself, which he then goes off to gamble with his friend Vicente. When Pepa uses her money to pay off Don Aquilino, he recognises the note as being one of those that he lent to Serafín.

Meanwhile, Pepa is visited by Vicente's girlfriend, Manuela, a rival water vendor without her own stall. Since Manuela's boyfriend is Pepa's ex, they have a colourful argument.

Asia and her mother meet Pepa at her stall, where she tells them of Serafín's plan to seduce Asia. Pepa agrees that when Serafín arrives, she will put the sleeping tablet in his drink instead, to serve him right.

When Serafín arrives and orders the drinks, Asia's mother pretends to fall asleep, whereupon Serafín tries to win over Asia, who persuades him to give her the rent money they need. At this point, the mother wakes up and the women suggest going for a walk. Serafín gets up but, having already drunk the sleeping potion, falls down fast asleep. Asia is disgusted by his behaviour and vows to return to Valdepatata.

At midnight Pepa, Lorenzo, Manuela and Vicente dress up and go to the San Lorenzo party. Serafín is still asleep and in the confusion he is robbed by Garibaldi, a busker who plays the lyre.

El Bateo - The Baptism

The scene is set in the lower class suburbs of Madrid, around 1900.

Preparations are being made for the baptism of the baby recently born to Nieves and her boyfriend Lolo. Friends and neighbours are celebrating with ‘Sevillana’ dances. The godfather is Wamba, a fierce anarchist.

Nieves arrives to meet her mother, Valeriana, very upset at having met her ex-boyfriend, Pamplinas, who is determined to ruin the christening, having been betrayed by Nieves in the past.

Visita, Lolo's ex-girlfriend, is also jealous and decides to help Pamplinas in ruining the baptism. She takes advantage of Virginio, a young shop assistant who is very much in love with her, and persuades him to help her spread rumours of Nieves’ infidelity. When Lolo arrives, Visita tells him she has heard rumours that the baby isn't his. Lolo's friends and family encourage him not to believe the rumours.

Interlude - song and dance by the city's barrel-organ grinders.

At the church, the registrar tries to write down the details for the baptism, while Wamba complains that going to church is against his anarchist beliefs. He suggests the baby should be named Robespierre in honour of freedom. As the registrar completes the document with the names of the parents and godparents, Pamplinas appears and says the baptism cannot take place since the baby isn't Lolo's. A fight breaks out.

The friends and neighbours are waiting to celebrate the baptism meal. A photographer takes pictures of the group and they dance a Gavotte.

Wamba arrives and tells everyone what happened at the church. Nieves and Valeriana appear, having searched everywhere for Lolo and Pamplinas, who then arrive on the scene.

Pamplinas says he wants everyone to know the truth about Nieves, who has been betraying Lolo just like she betrayed him. He says that every night at 2am, a man goes into Nieves’ house.

Wamba speaks up and confesses that it was him, and that he was visiting Valeriana! Everyone is happy and Nieves & Lolo, Wamba & Valeriana agree to get married and to baptise the baby the following day. They all blame Virgino for spreading the rumours.

== Legacy ==
Madrid's gay neighborhood, Chueca, takes its name from its Plaza de Chueca which was named after him.
