= José Serrano (composer) =

Spanish composer (1873–1941)

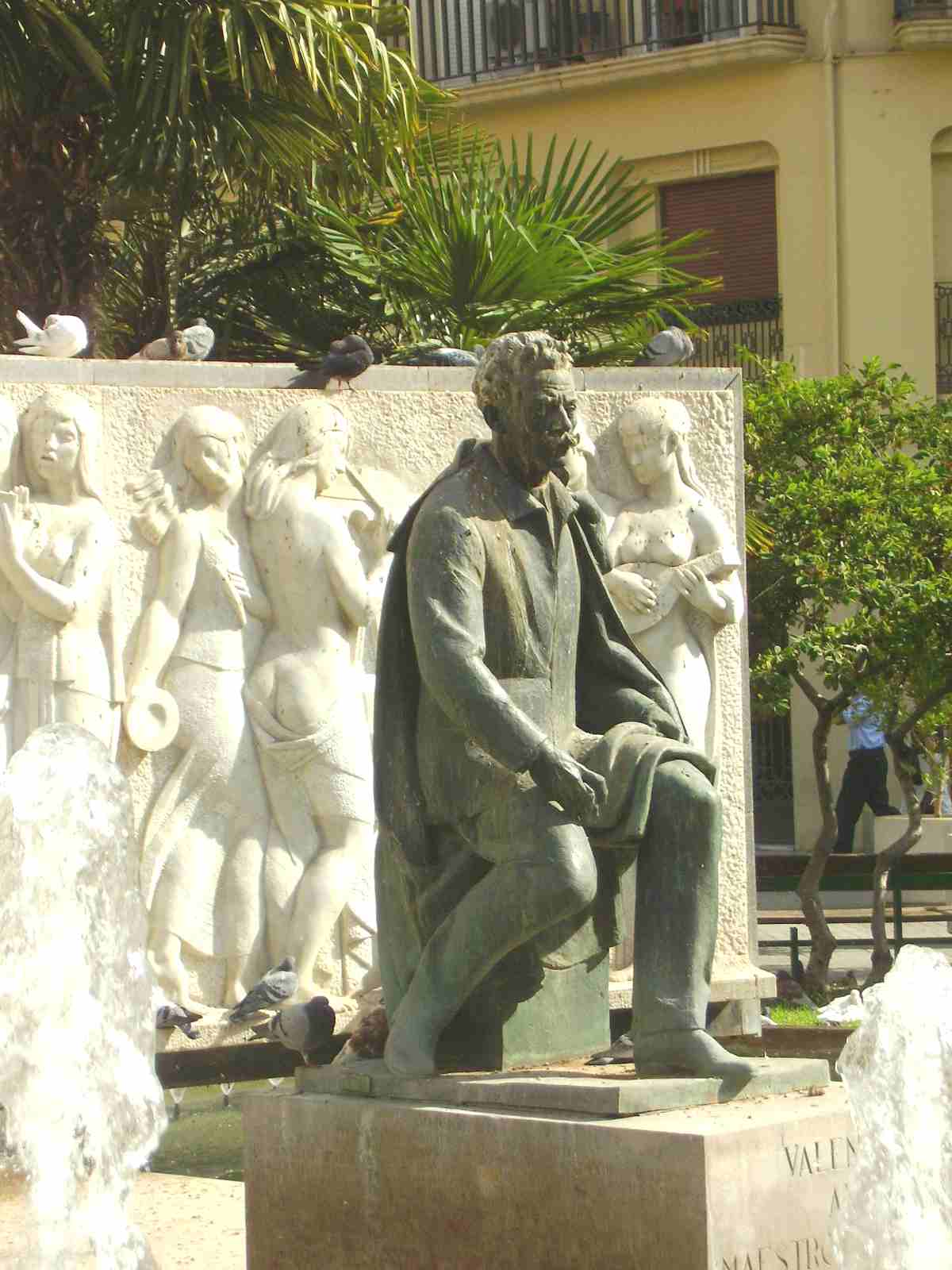
Statue of Serrano in València

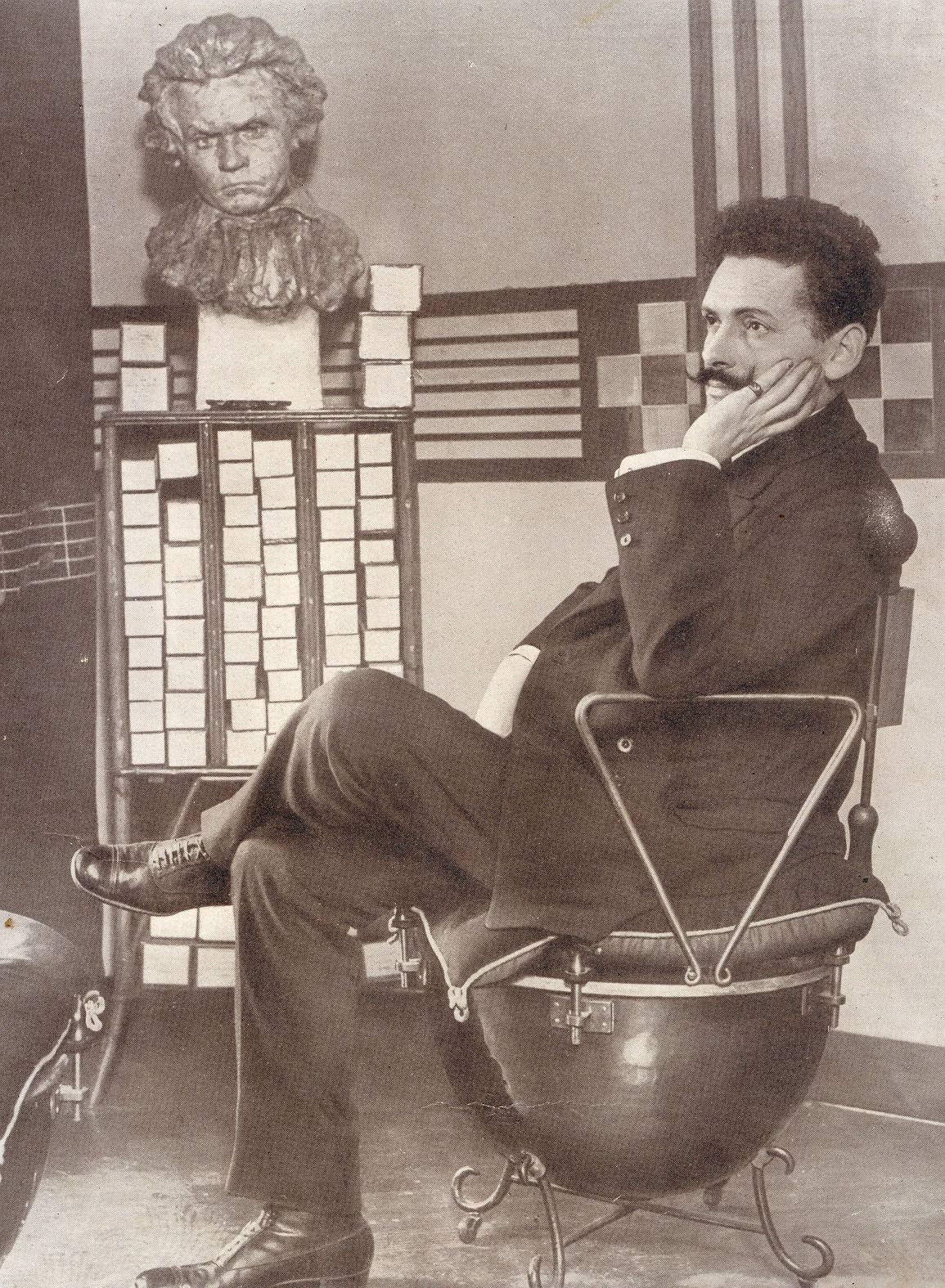
Serrano in 1914

José Serrano Simeón (14 October 1873 – 8 March 1941) was a Spanish composer, known for producing zarzuelas. He was born in Sueca, Valencia, Spain.

His most famous works include La dolorosa (Lady of the Sorrows) and La canción del olvido (The Song of Forgetting). Serrano’s output mainly consists of popular, one-act zarzuelas, many filled with strong, dramatic and emotional situations. He is considered to be the musical heir of Federico Chueca and the influence of Giacomo Puccini and Italian verismo is evident in many of his works.

Serrano died in Madrid aged 67.
