= Ramón de la Cruz =

Spanish neoclassical dramatist

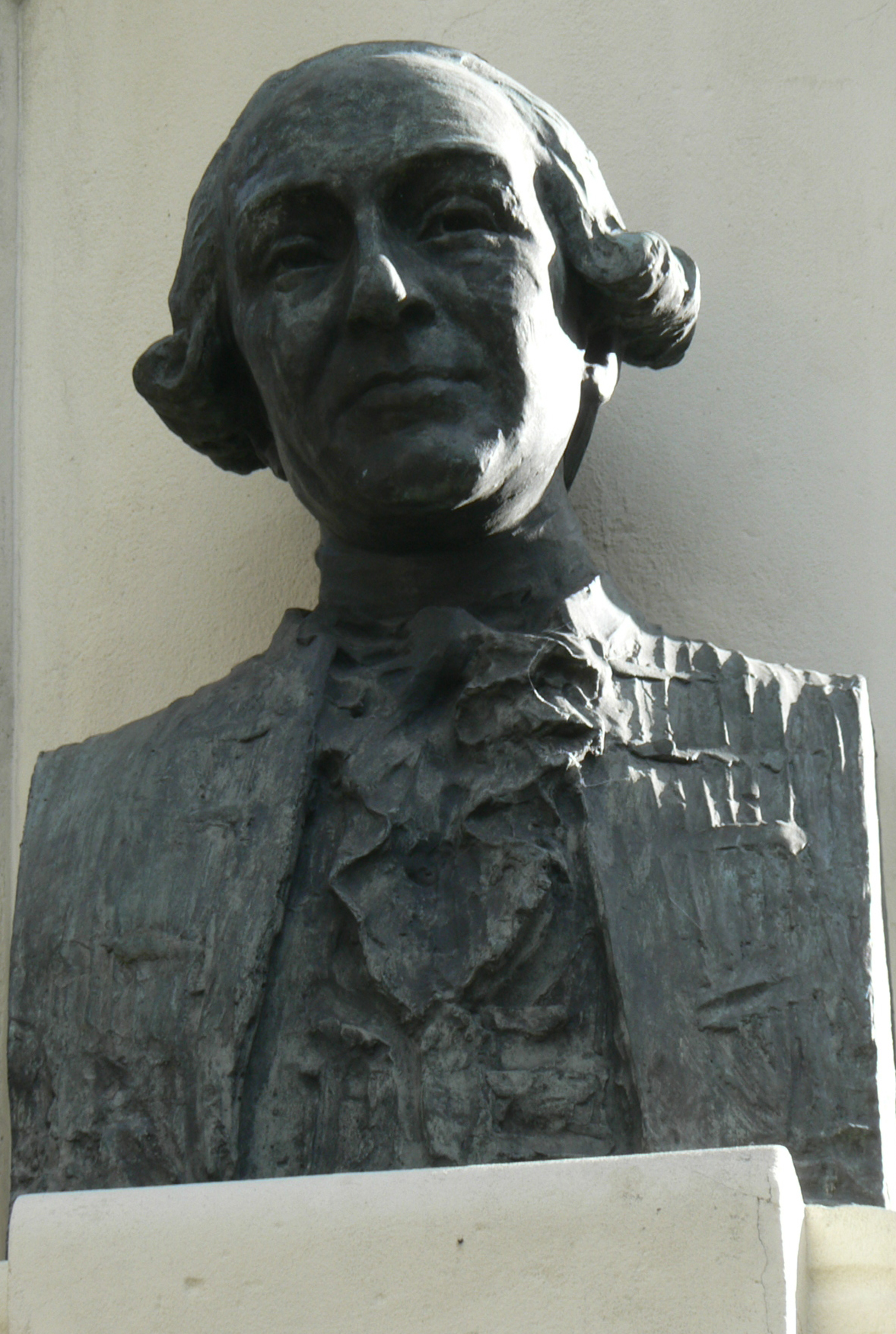
Bust of Ramón de la Cruz in Madrid (L. Coullaut, 1913)

Ramón de la Cruz (28 March 1731 – 5 March 1794) was a Spanish neoclassical dramatist.

Born in Madrid, he was a clerk in the ministry of finance. He is the author of nearly 400 sainetes, little farcical sketches of city life, written to be played between the acts of a longer play. He published a selection in ten volumes (Madrid, 1786–1791). The best of his pieces, such as Las Tertulias de Madrid, are specimens of satiric observation.

Historians acknowledge that his writings provide a vivid window into the life of late 18th century Madrid, including satirizing the customs of the different classes of the city.
