= Ruperto Chapí =

Spanish composer

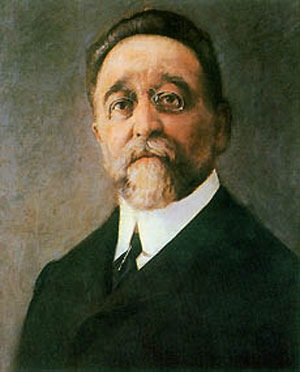
Ruperto Chapí

Ruperto Chapí y Lorente (27 March 1851 – 25 March 1909) was a Spanish composer, and co-founder of the Spanish Society of Authors and Publishers.

== Biography ==
Chapí was born at Villena, the son of a local barber. At just nine years old, he joined the Música Nueva band (current Villena Municipal Band) where he would soon become a virtuoso and of which he would end up being director at only 15 years old. He would gain some fame as an interpreter in the surroundings of the Moors and Christians Festival of Villena, also being highly sought after in those of other nearby towns. In the Valencian-speaking towns, to the north and northeast of Villena, he was popularly known as "el xiquet de Villena" and they continually disputed hiring him, given his brilliance.

He continued training in his home town and in Madrid when he was 16 years old. He wrote many symphonic, band, choral and chamber works, as well as zarzuelas and operas, becoming, alongside Tomás Bretón, a fellow pupil of Emilio Arrieta at the Madrid Conservatory. He was one of the most popular and important composers of his time. He wrote zarzuelas in all shapes and sizes, including the three-act zarzuela grande and the one-act género chico forms. His most celebrated work is La revoltosa, written in the latter style. Many of the preludes to his zarzuelas (including those to El tambor de granaderos and La patria chica) have remained staple items in Spanish orchestral concerts.

He died in Madrid in 1909.

== Symphonic works ==
- Sinfonía en Re (Symphony in d) (by 1879)
- Escenas de capa y espada (Scenes of Cloak and Sword), symphonic poem (1876)
- La Corte de Granada: Fantasía Morisca (The Court at Granada: Moorish Fantasy; 1873/1879)
- Polaca de concierto (Concert Polka; 1879)
- Los gnomos de la Alhambra (The Gnomes of the Alhambra; 1891)
- Combate de Don Quijote contra las Ovejas – Scherzo (Don Quixote's Fight against the Windmills; 1902)
- La Revoltosa, Orchestral Fantasy (1897)

== Chamber music ==
- String quartet No. 1 in G major (1903)
- String quartet No. 2 in F minor (1904)
- String quartet No. 3 in D major (1905)
- String quartet No. 4 in B minor (1907)

== Principal zarzuelas and operas ==
- Roger de Flor, opera in 3 acts (1878)
- Música clásica, zarzuela in 1 act (1880)
- La serenata, opera in 1 act (1881)
- La tempestad, zarzuela in 3 acts (1882)
- La bruja, zarzuela in 3 acts (1887)
- El milagro de la Virgen, zarzuela in 3 acts (1884)
- Las hijas del Zebedeo, zarzuela in 2 acts (1889)
- El rey que rabió, zarzuela in 3 acts (1891)
- Curro Vargas, zarzuela in 3 acts (1898)
- El tambor de granaderos, zarzuela in 1 act (1894)
- Las bravías, zarzuela in 1 act (1896)
- La revoltosa, zarzuela in 1 act (1897)
- La chavala, zarzuela in 1 act (1898)
- El barquillero, zarzuela in 1 act (1900)
- El puñao de rosas, zarzuela in 1 act (1902)
- La venta de Don Quijote, zarzuela in 1 act (1902)
- Circe, opera in 3 acts (1902)
- La patria chica, zarzuela in 1 act (1907)
- Margarita la tornera, opera in 3 acts (1909)
