= Zaidee Jackson =

American singer (1897–1970)

- Born: December 30, 1897; Augusta, Georgia
- Died: December 15, 1970 (aged 71); Waterbury, Connecticut
- Occupations: Dancer; singer; actress
- Years active: 1924–1959
- Spouses: James Jackson (m. 1920–1927) Barbu Neamțu (m. 1938–1955)
- Musical career
- Genres: Spirituals, music hall, jazz, traditional pop
- Instruments: Vocals, piano
- Labels: Columbia, Duophone Records, Odeon

Zaidee Jackson (December 30, 1897 – December 15, 1970) was an American-born jazz, spiritual and traditional pop singer, dancer and actress who performed in the United States and Europe. From 1938 to 1956 she lived and worked in Romania. Accused of being a Communist, her American passport was revoked and she could only return to the United States following a successful appeal filed by the American Civil Liberties Union with the Board of Immigration Appeals.

== Early life ==
Zaidee Jackson was born December 30, 1897, in Augusta, Georgia, to a family of sharecroppers. When she was three years old, she moved with her mother to Boston, Massachusetts. Jackson worked as a dressmaker and was briefly married in the early 1920s. Around 1923, she became a chorus girl with the Lafayette Players.

== Career ==
=== Early career (1924–1927) ===
From late 1924 to early 1925, Jackson traveled across the South as an actress with the Andrew S. Bishop Players, an extension of the old Lafayette Players Company. The company toured Tennessee and Kentucky performing the play Paid in Full. By mid-1925, she had become the lead performer in Wilbur Sweatman's Creole Revue, touring the Eastern Seaboard and Canada.

In January 1926, director David Belasco cast Jackson in Lulu Belle, a melodramatic play staged on Broadway. The cast consisted of 100 Black and 15 White performers, the stars being Black actresses such as Evelyn Preer, Ollie Burgoyne, Mattie Wilkes and Fannie Belle de Knight. Jackson had a minor role in the beginning of the play as a Harlem entertainer in the fictional Elite Grotto nightclub. Opening February 9, 1926, at the Belasco Theatre, the show was performed 461 times before closing on May 16. Jackson was also performing at Harlem's Club Alabam, known for its semi-nude Josephine Baker-esque revues. In late November, Jackson and several of the cast from Lulu Belle were hired by the Black film director Oscar Micheaux to appear in a film, The Spider's Web. Filming began that winter in Baltimore, and the film was released on January 6, 1927.

In April 1927, Jackson appeared in Desires of 1927 at the Lafayette Theatre. The revue was staged and produced by Irvin C. Miller with Adelaide Hall as its star. In July, Jackson was cast as Magnolia in Rang Tang, co-produced by Flournoy Miller and Aubrey Lyles, which opened July 12 for 112 performances at the Majestic Theatre. The two-act musical comedy was set in Madagascar and Harlem and featured Miller & Lyles with Daniel L. Haynes and Josephine Hall. After its Broadway run closed on October 22, the show prepared to go on the road.

However, Lawrence Benjamin Brown, who was touring Europe with Paul Robeson, suggested that Jackson visit him in Paris. In November 1927, Jackson sailed from New York to France. A short piece in The Afro-American on December 17 said: "Zaidee Jackson, formerly of the Rang Tang company, has left for Europe where she will join her friends, Lawrence Brown and Paul Robeson".

=== European career (1928–1936) ===
Having performed on stage in Cannes for several weeks in early 1928, Jackson moved to London where she was well received. She appeared in May Edginton's play, Deadlock, at the Comedy Theatre and was popular on radio. She had other successful engagements at the Piccadilly Hotel and the Cafe Anglais. In addition, she had made four recordings of spirituals for the Brunswick label and then signed a contract with Parlophone for future recordings. Jackson told a reporter that she intended to make a visit to America "in the next few months". She alternated between London and Paris in 1929. On one occasion in the spring, Jackson was invited to sing at Countee Cullen's small house party near the Rue Pigalle in Paris and at Black dancer Louis Cole's birthday party in his apartment near the Trocadero. On June 27, 1930, the weekly newspaper La Semaine à Paris carried an advert for a Russian-themed Sheherazade Cabaret with Jackson as one of the leading performers.

Jackson continued to make appearances throughout Europe. In early 1933, film director Andrew Buchanan gave her parts in two short films made for the Ideal Cine-Magazine, I've Got the Wrong Man and Black Magic. She recorded numbers from the films with Decca Records and then returned to Paris. From June to October 1933, Jackson starred in Joe Zelli's new cabaret, Chez Les Nudistes, appearing semi-nude in the extravagant revue, Au Dela... des Reins, at Zelli's Club in Paris.

Jackson toured Switzerland and the French Riviera during the next two years. In February 1936, she was in Monte Carlo and watched the end of the annual Rallye Monte Carlo. She was introduced to one of the drivers, a wealthy Romanian engineer called Barbu Neamțu. The two became lovers and Jackson accompanied him to his native Craiova as his mistress. Neamțu was in an unhappy marriage and began divorce proceedings so he could marry Jackson. She continued her singing career with a residency at the Parisian-themed Restaurant-Bar Zissu in Bucharest.

=== America in 1937–38 ===
In October 1937, Jackson sailed from Cherbourg to New York on the RMS Queen Mary to begin a ten-month night club engagement there and in Philadelphia. She was met by American journalists including one from the Pittsburgh Courier who reported:

Zaidee Williams Jackson was singing sweet songs at Chez Florence in Montmartre when we met her. A slim bronze young woman, who had Paris by its ears. We wonder if anyone who has lived over there for ten years as she has can come back here to prejudice and hate and pick up where she left off. We don't doubt that she'll return to Europe where, she says 'her work is more appreciated... and more lucrative'.

=== Romania (1938–1945) ===
Jackson went back to Romania in September 1938 but had some difficulty in renewing her work visa as the Romanian government insisted that she must be an "Ethnic Romanian". She married Neamțu about this time and was granted Romanian citizenship. In November, she returned to Paris and appeared at Jimmy Monroe's Swing Club. The following month she appeared in the revue, Harlem au Coliseum at the Paris Coliseum, alongside The 3 Dukes and Myrtle Watkins with music provided by Willie Lewis and His Entertainers.

In February 1939, after warnings of impending war were issued by the American Embassy in Paris, Jackson returned to Craiova and appeared regularly on Radio-Bucharest, performing popular American songs she had learned during her 1938 trip to the States. She had another residency at the Restaurant Zissu, alongside Jean Moscopol, and appeared in various concerts with other Romanian entertainers, including a jazz event at the Romanian Athenaeum in January 1940. That concert was a great success and increased her popularity among Romanian audiences. As Romania was allied to Nazi Germany, Jackson was largely unaffected by World War II until the Red Army invasion in August 1944. Theatres, cabarets and cinemas were shut down so Jackson was unable to perform again until the war ended and the entertainment venues reopened.

=== Communist Romania (1946–1956) ===
From 1945, Jackson continued her Restaurant Zissu residency until the end of 1947 when it was closed down. After that, she had difficulty finding work and making ends meet. The Romanian Communist Party came to power in 1948 and promptly nationalized all businesses and establishments. Jackson became, despite being an entertainer, effectively an employee of the state. Because of that, the American Embassy in Bucharest declared her passport void and so she could not visit the United States.

In April 1951, her husband and some of his family were arrested as "bourgeois spies" and imprisoned for the next four years. Living alone and fending for herself, Jackson was still able to perform but on meagre wages. She decided to petition the US Embassy for the return of her passport. Similar efforts were made by her sister in New York.

When her husband was released in 1955, he was ordered to take a provincial job away from Bucharest and Craiova. He asked Jackson to accompany him but she decided to remain in Bucharest and they agreed to divorce. In April 1955, her sister wrote directly to President Eisenhower who was sympathetic and promised prompt action. After her divorce was finalized, Jackson was able to embark on a tour of Romania's major cities.

=== Later years ===
In January 1956, as the result of an appeal filed by the American Civil Liberties Union with the Board of Immigration Appeals, the US State Department permitted Jackson to return to the United States. She resumed her career on the American stage until 1959. During the summer of 1967, she gave a brief interview in Harlem to Frank Driggs. Zaidee Jackson died on December 15, 1970.
