= Myrtle Watkins =

American singer

Myrtle Paquita Zarate
- Born: Myrtle Dillard; June 23, 1908; Birmingham, Alabama
- Died: November 10, 1968 (aged 60); Corvallis, Oregon
- Occupations: Dancer; singer; actress
- Years active: 1925–1968
- Spouses: Cephus Watkins (m. 1927–1928) Edward Thompson (m. 1929–1930) Lall Singh (m. 1936–1939) Samuel Zarate (m. 1944–1968)
- Musical career
- Genres: Calypso, music hall, Cuban Rumba, Cuplé, Jazz, Traditional Pop
- Instrument: Vocals
- Labels: Columbia, ZARPAC Records, Northwestern

Myrtle Watkins (June 23, 1908 – November 10, 1968) was an American-born Mexican dancer, singer of jazz and Latin American music, and actress, best known in the United States and Mexico by the name Paquita Zarate.

== Early life ==
Myrtle Watkins was born Myrtle Dillard in Birmingham, Alabama, in June 1908. She was the fifth child of Betty S. and Jasper L. Dillard. A 1910 Alabama census confirms her birth. Her father owned and operated J. L. Dillard's Fish Company, a grocery store in Birmingham. In mid-1925, at the age of 17, Myrtle appeared in Baltimore as a dancer with her partner Yank Brunson. The Baltimore Afro-American newspaper recognized her as a local entertainer. By late 1925, she had joined Eddie Lemon's Stock Company, performing in the "Who Dat?" revue at the Regent Theater.

When Eddie Lemon departed for Philadelphia early in 1926, Myrtle remained at the Regent as part of Lew Peyton's Brownskin Vamps. She gained recognition for her solo Charleston performance during this time. Myrtle married local mechanic Cephus Watkins, but the marriage was short-lived. Subsequently, she performed at the "all-white" Folly Cabaret in East Baltimore, where her Charleston became immensely popular. A few weeks later, she left for Boston to join the "Rarin' to Go" revue. In 1928, while touring the Boston area with the Bostonian Harmony Lads, singing light blues, Myrtle expressed her longing for Baltimore in an article for the Afro-American newspaper.

== Career ==
=== Arrival in Europe ===
During the winter of 1928, Myrtle joined the cast of the second version of Lew Leslie's Blackbirds during the Boston auditions. She eventually met Eddie Thompson, one of the show's leading dancers and part of the duo Worthy & Thompson. Myrtle and Eddie returned briefly to New York (on February 4, 1929) to marry, although this was another brief marriage. Blackbirds continued touring the Eastern U.S. until May 31, when the troupe boarded the SS Ile de France for France. There, they performed for three months at the Moulin Rouge before the French director renovated the venue into a cinema. The show opened on June 7 and was a sensation, with some of France's top stars attending, including Mistinguett and Maurice Chevalier. Adelaide Hall was the star attraction, and replacing Bill "Bojangles" Robinson in this version were John Worthy and Ed Thompson. Blackbirds returned to New York for a brief East Coast tour in September, but its return coincided with the famous Wall Street crash, leaving the troupe without work.

In April 1930, United States Census takers arrived at the Thompson residence on 7th Avenue, where Mrs. Myrtle Thompson mentioned that she was employed as an entertainer with origins in Alabama. Weeks later, while engaged at Harlem's Lennox Club, Afro-American songwriter Eugene Newton, who had previously opened a Parisian nightclub in 1929, began plans to open a new cabaret in the French capital. He organized Newton's Chocolate Revue as the main act. While Eddie Thompson was away touring across America, Myrtle returned to France to join the revue, arriving around April 26. The show was promptly reorganized with the help of Eugene Bullard and S.H. Dudley Jr. before preparing for its opening a week later. On May 1, the Comedy Club Revue opened at Gene Newton's Le Comedy Club, where the production ran for several weeks before the establishment was shut down by French authorities. On May 24, the cast moved to Eugene Bullard's Embassy Club, rebranding the show as Revue Noire: Hot Stuff, featuring headliners Louis Cole, Elisabeth Welch, Lillian Brown, and comic Snow Fisher.

On May 31, Louis Cole, Elisabeth Welch, Myrtle Watkins, and Senegalese Folies-Bergère star Féral Benga were entertaining at the Enfants-Terribles Restaurant, quickly becoming a popular attraction. On June 23, an artistic gala was held at the Enfants-Terribles, where Myrtle performed alongside Lucienne Boyer, Alina de Silva, the Irving Sisters, Charpini and Brancato, and M. Pisella to the sound of Pance Lowry's orchestra. For the remainder of the summer, Myrtle teamed up with Elisabeth Welch, appearing at the famous supper club Chez Florence in long orange satin gowns designed by Jean Patou, lifting their skirts to reveal their long legs as they danced. Soon after, she appeared again at the Embassy with the show Ebony Follies. By late 1930, after most of the cast at the Embassy had already returned to America, Myrtle began performing at the Champs-Élysées Nightclub before eventually making her way southwest to Spain.

=== Spain (1930–33) ===
Myrtle probably arrived in Spain that winter, as she opened in Madrid on January 6, 1931, with her Red Hot Coals Jazz Orchestra at the Lido de Madrid Cabaret (located underneath the Teatro Alcázar on Calle de Alcalá 20). Her arrival was likely organized by Spanish author and lyricist Alvaro Retana, who was known for introducing black jazz entertainers to Spain. Retana later mentioned in his memoirs that Myrtle performed semi-nude, imitating the Spanish dancer Carmen Tortola Valencia, under the name Perla de Oriente.

On March 7, her contract at the Lido ended, and Myrtle traveled south to Seville's Casino del Exposición, where she was performing when the Spanish monarchy ended on April 14, with Niceto Alcalá-Zamora y Torres declared president and former King Alfonso XIII peacefully abdicating and boarding a train to France in exile.

In May, Myrtle returned triumphantly to Madrid's Lido as celebrations filled the streets. On June 6, she performed at the Sala Metropolitano, and three days later moved to the Ideals-Rosales open-air cabaret, where she performed with Carlos VG Flores' Orchestra until July 6. During this engagement, she was introduced to Argentine singer-guitarist Alfredo Marino (born January 30, 1904) and his partner Hector Morel. After her contract ended at the Ideals-Rosales, Myrtle joined the duo on a tour across Spain's northern coast, performing in cities such as Bilbao, Oviedo, and San Sebastián.

Upon returning to Madrid on July 22, she appeared at the Casanova en Stambul cabaret alongside Manuel Pizarro's Argentina Orchestra for three days. On August 11, Myrtle performed at the Dancing Retiro, a nightclub located in Madrid's lush Parque del Buen Retiro, alongside popular Afro-American bandleader Harry Flemming and his orchestra. Two days later, she reunited with Morel and Marino, and together they performed at the Teatro Alkazar in a magnificent stage show for six weeks.

On October 2, Myrtle appeared at the Circo Price for three days before boarding a train to Barcelona. Not long after arriving, she made several appearances on Spanish radio and recorded several songs for the Compañía del Gramófono-Barcelona. Although none of these recordings seem to have survived, she was noted for performing El Manisero and other popular Cuban rumbas and Spanish pasodoble toreros during this time.

On October 27, Myrtle, along with Afro-American dancer Josephine Wynn (whom she had met months earlier at the Retiro), opened at the popular Eden Concert Music Hall, where they performed successfully for a month. On November 8, Myrtle participated in the Fiesta Parisina at the Eden Concert alongside Afro-Uruguayan singer Oscar Rorra, known by the stage name Caruso Negro.

On November 17, at the Teatro Novedades, she performed in a benefit for Barcelona's firefighters. On November 21, Myrtle participated in an eight-day variety spectacle at the Circo Barcelonés, alongside some of Spain's top entertainers.

On December 16, Myrtle appeared with Afro-American dancer Jimmy Holmes at the Buena Sombra Cabaret, where she performed until February 3.

From February 28 to March 16, 1932, Myrtle performed with Afro-American bandleader Levi Wine's Revista Americana, which included popular Spanish cabaret artist Bella Dorita, at the Ba-Ta-Clan in Valencia. A week later, she returned to Madrid and established a residence at the Hotel Florida. On March 24 (or April 4), she opened at the Lido de Madrid with Louis Douglas's company, where they were engaged throughout the month. After hours, Myrtle would drive over to the Teatro Fuencarral, where she also appeared in Folklóricos Arrevistados, alongside Argentinean actress Perlita Greco and Rosarillo de Triana.

In early May, while Louis Douglas recovered in a local hospital from stomach pains, Myrtle, together with dancer Scrappy Jones, reorganized the company from his bedside. On May 21, Modern Melodies opened at the Avenida Cinema, where Myrtle performed in a costume with red feathers swinging on her backside. A visiting journalist for the Afro-American described her as the "Josephine Baker of Spain":

"Miss Watkins is a very good dancer, with plenty of pep, and a pretty shapely figure. She is making conquests in high society and on her string is the marquis of one of Spain's bluest blue bloods. She lives at the Hotel Florida, one of the best hotels in the city, has a fine roadster, records for Spanish gramophone and radio, and entertains at one of the leading cabarets."

The revue closed on June 16, and Louis Douglas took the company to another theater, although it's unclear whether Myrtle joined them.

On July 14, Myrtle and Josephine Wynn traveled to the city of Zaragoza to perform for three weeks at the Florida Bar. On October 4, Spanish newspapers reported that an upcoming film, Movietone 1933, was in preparation at a Madrid film studio. The film was set to feature Perlita Greco, Myrtle, Scrappy Jones, and several other Spanish actors. However, it’s unknown whether the film was ever completed.

On October 13, Myrtle performed in the city of Huesca at the Cine Odeon with Cuban saxophonist El Negro Aquilino and his band. In December, Louis Douglas and his troupe departed for what would be a failed Italian tour. It's unclear whether Myrtle accompanied him, as she disappears from the public eye for several months. She may have spent this time performing in various Spanish provinces.

On January 10, 1933, Myrtle resurfaced in Andalusía, performing at Seville's Teatro del Duque. On January 21, she was engaged at the Teatro Mora in the nearby city of Huelva. A short time later, on March 9, she appeared back in Seville at the Pathe Cinema for four days.

In June 1933, Myrtle toured Belgium with bandleader Robert de Kers. While there, she recorded a new song, Lonely Brown Rose (which was also translated into French as Rose Creole) and appeared on the covers of Belgian magazines. After returning to Spain in the fall, she opened on September 15 at Barcelona's Teatro Romea in Max Guido's Jazz Show revue, where she performed for two magnificent weeks. On October 7, she moved to the glamorous Pompeya Musichall, where she danced all evening for a month. After midnight, she would run down the street to sing at the popular Hollywood nightclub, where her performances were broadcast as floorshows over the radio.

At the Hollywood, she performed alongside her latest rival, 17-year-old Elsie Bayron, who, although born in Puerto Rico, had grown up in Harlem and was showcasing her repertoire from the Savoy Ballroom every night in Barcelona's popular nightclubs. On November 17, Myrtle appeared at the exclusive Casa Llibre Tea Rooms, singing for some of Spain's elite.

That winter, Myrtle teamed up with Afro-American pianist Tommy Puss Chase and his band for a tour along the southern coast of France. They performed in Cannes, Nice, and ended in Monaco during the Rallye Monte Carlo. A contemporary described Myrtle as "a very enterprising girl, always had some kind of band with her, and was a very good looking and talented singer and dancer."

=== European tour (1934–36) ===
On March 11, 1934, Ada "Bricktop" Smith postponed the opening of her new Parisian nightclub, Monico's, until Myrtle arrived, advertising her as "the world’s most fascinating entertainer." After three months, on June 2, Myrtle moved on to the Basque Bar, where she performed alongside entertainer Evelyn Dove.

On July 2, Myrtle debuted in London's Granada Theater in the ‘all-colored’ revue Black Scandals, which ran for a successful week. The films shown that week on the manager's weekly report were noted to be weak, and it was stated that had it not been for the stage show, the box office takings would have been significantly lower.

On July 14, newspapers reported that Myrtle returned home to Spain to handle personal affairs. By August 25, she was in the Netherlands, performing in The Hague at the popular Palais de Danse cabaret with French singer Marie Dubas. On November 3, Myrtle appeared at London's Cafe Anglais with Louis Simmonds' Orchestra.

On January 31, 1935, Myrtle returned to Paris, performing at the popular Cuban-themed Melody-Bar with Afro-American tenor Opal Cooper. While there, she learned that her estranged husband, Eddie, was ill with stomach cancer and had to halt his career while recovering in the hospital.

In March, Myrtle left for Berlin to appear in a film before returning in May to perform at the Boeuf Sur Le Toit with Leon Abbey's orchestra. While touring Belgium again during the late summer, Leon Abbey arranged for Myrtle to perform with his orchestra in Bombay, India, for six months. After boarding a ship in Venice, they arrived in Bombay in early October, only to realize they did not have the proper work permits.

Later joined by Opal Cooper, the group performed at the Taj Mahal Hotel and Green's Ballroom next door, gaining much success. By December, however, Myrtle was struck by a terrible bout of malaria. During her stay, she was introduced to a handsome Malaysian cricket player, Lall Singh, who was captivated by this new popular jazz artist in India. Lall Singh, born on December 16, 1909, into the affluent Gill Jat family of Malaya, had ancestors who had migrated from India three generations before. He was the youngest of three sons, with his elder brothers being Santha Singh Gill and Bishen Singh Gill.

All three brothers studied at the Victoria Institute in Kuala Lumpur. Driven by a strong passion to play cricket at the highest possible level, Lall Singh convinced his mother to support and sponsor his cricket endeavors in India. The family approached Maharajah Patiala, Bhupindar Singh, who was known to them. Maharajah Bhupinder Singh, a good cricketer and lover of the game himself, advised the family to send Lall Singh to Patiala to play for his team, Maharajah Patiala XI, which was led by the Maharajah himself.

Lall Singh arrived in Patiala in 1931, where he developed a lifelong love for the 'Patiala Peg' while in the company of Maharajah Bhupinder Singh. The following year, Lall was selected for India's inaugural tour to England. In the 1934–35 season, Lall Singh represented Hindus in the Bombay Quadrangular tournament and South Punjab in the inaugural Ranji Trophy.

Maharajah Bhupinder Singh was very fond of Lall, and their closeness led to many enemies. As a result, there was an attempt on Lall Singh's life in 1936. He was seriously injured but survived.

By March 1936, after recovering from his injuries, and with the permission of Maharajah Bhupinder Singh, Lall took a short break from cricket and returned to Europe with Myrtle, now working as her theatrical agent. Soon after, the couple married, and Myrtle began wearing a sari and practicing Sikhism alongside her new husband. Around this time, her former husband in Harlem died of stomach cancer.

Throughout the spring, Myrtle performed in Egypt and Greece. In June, she arrived in Turkey, performing at Istanbul's Taksim Bahcesi club (June 3–19), located on Taksim Square. After traveling across Bulgaria, Romania, and Yugoslavia, Myrtle arrived in Czechoslovakia to perform at Prague's Savarin Cabaret (October 1–2) before moving on to Hungary. On November 1, Amerika Revu Kultura opened at Budapest's famous Arizona Csodabár, one of the most celebrated nightclubs in the Hungarian capital. While guests danced on the rotating dance floor and chorus girls were perched on mechanical chandeliers that descended from the ceiling, Myrtle was one of the leading "African" stars of this multicultural show. After the revue closed, Myrtle went to the Negresco Café for the remainder of the winter (December 2–January 5).

=== Transition into Paquita (1937–40) ===
Unable to return home to Spain due to the outbreak of the Spanish Civil War, Myrtle instead traveled back to Paris in the spring of 1937, in time for the Exposition Internationale. She performed at Le Grand Jeu Cabaret and the George V Restaurant, where she held live radio broadcasts and performed for visiting dignitaries and royalty at the Exposition. She was soon accompanied by Samuel Bonifacio Zarate, a Mexican violinist popular among French audiences for his virtuoso skills. Zarate had worked with Carlos Chávez's Sinfónica de Mexico at the Palacio de Bellas Artes in Mexico City and graduated from the Mexican National Conservatory, where he studied under Luis G. Saloma. He earned a scholarship from the Mexican government to study in Paris at the l'École Normale Supérieure (1932–37) and won first prize at the International Violin Competition earlier that spring. To make ends meet, he often entertained, sometimes with the Mexican-American vedette Reva Reyes. On one occasion, he was hired to entertain royalty at the George V restaurant, where he met Myrtle. She soon adopted the name Paquita, and they quickly became a musical team.

In September, they moved to the Pavillon-Elysees and spent the winter at the Villa d'Este cabaret. In June 1938, Adelaide Hall left for London, leaving behind her cabaret, the Big Apple Club. Myrtle became the club's main attraction, while Bricktop managed the finances. However, Bricktop was ineffective at managing the accounts, and her temper worsened, leading to the cabaret's closure that winter. Before the club shut down, Myrtle returned to the Villa d'Este in September. In December, she performed in Harlem au Coliseum at the Paris-Coliseum alongside artists such as her new partner Samuel Zarate and Zaidee Jackson. She later opened at the new Park-Lane Club with Louis Armstrong and his Cuban-American orchestra.

During the summer of 1939, while Myrtle and Zarate toured the Baltic coast, where her German films had been successful, tensions in Europe escalated. Posters appeared everywhere stating, "Because of the aggressive attitude of the German government, France and the United Kingdom have declared general mobilization." In August, Myrtle performed on Radio-Warsaw. A few weeks later, Polish musician Stanley Laudan invited Myrtle to perform at La Bagatelle, his club in Katowice. On September 1, World War II began as Nazi troops swiftly seized Poland. As Poland mobilized to defend itself, Myrtle was able to obtain documents to flee back to Paris. Upon arriving, Lall decided to renew his cricket contract and return to Malaysia. At some point, the couple likely decided to divorce in November. With danger once again approaching, the Germans turned their attention to France in early 1940.

=== India (1941–43) ===
Paquita and Zarate were once again in danger as the Germans turned their attention to France in early 1940. They departed for a Middle Eastern tour, traveling across Egypt and Iraq during the early years of the war. By the summer of 1941, they arrived in India, where they achieved major success at Lahore's Stiffle Hotel, as well as Bombay's Taj Mahal and Green's Hotels. Their success caught the attention of Calcutta's Grand Hotel, which housed popular American jazz musician Teddy Weatherford, whom Myrtle had briefly met in 1937. Weatherford, who had just arrived from Ceylon, was now the music director of the hotel's ballroom. In November, the Grand Ballroom's floor show featured Myrtle dancing and singing Latin American numbers. She was soon broadcast over Indian radio, and Myrtle recorded the numbers from the show with Indian Columbia Records so that her audience could enjoy her performances at home.

In January 1942, Japanese troops occupied Kuala Lumpur. Lall Singh was seized and placed in a work camp with his brother, BS Gill (who eventually died) until the country was liberated in August 1945. Meanwhile, the Quit India movement, which called for the creation of an independent India, swept across the country. Myrtle obtained an American passport during the summer, planning to leave the country before the situation worsened. However, the bliss of India was short-lived as Japanese planes began bombing Calcutta in early 1943. The Grand Hotel was flooded with soldiers, and Myrtle's shows were used to boost troop morale.

=== Mexico and return to the United States (1944–49) ===
Deciding it might be time to move on, Paquita and Zarate, now newly engaged, boarded the USS Hermitage, accompanied by Polish refugees, and traveled to California, arriving in San Pedro during the summer of 1943. California was in turmoil, with the Zoot Suit riots breaking out across the West Coast. Upon arriving in Los Angeles, the couple traveled south to Mexico, to Zarate's hometown of El Oro de Hidalgo, to spend time with his numerous relatives. After some time in Mexico, they returned to Los Angeles, where more opportunities awaited them in the entertainment field.

Paquita also began telling everyone that she was an Indian princess of the Brahmin caste, sent by her parents to study in Europe—likely a story created to avoid the racial issues she might have faced as an African-American artist. On January 6, 1944, the couple married quietly in Seattle. ‘Zarate & Paquita’ then took their show across the Western and Southwestern United States, Hawaii, Alaska, and Mexico. They performed alongside big names across the U.S., including Liberace, and became regular entertainers in cities like Reno, Salt Lake City, San Jose, and Eugene, Oregon.

They soon purchased a home in Evanston, Wyoming, along Interstate 80 near Salt Lake City, with easy access to Utah, Nevada, and California. During the summer of 1947, they performed at the Bastille Day celebrations in Reno for the French Consul. Their concerts typically began with Zarate playing classical violin and viola pieces in the first half, followed by Paquita joining him on drums in the second half, where she danced in a frenzy, dressed in elegant gowns, and sang songs from around the world in five different languages.

With such a hectic touring schedule, it seems they rarely took breaks. While Zarate often returned to Mexico to visit relatives, there is no indication that Paquita returned to Alabama to see her family or even visited Detroit to attend her father’s funeral in 1946.

=== Later career and death (1952–68) ===
In 1952, Zarate filed for American neutrality to establish himself more firmly in the United States. He also took on contracts with several recording companies, particularly Northwestern. Zarate and Paquita's records sold well across the Western United States. Later, Zarate opened his own music recording company, ZARPAC, based in their Los Angeles home, which also featured a recording studio. They recorded nearly a dozen albums a year and appeared on American radio and television. The couple became known for performing foreign songs and experimenting with different genres, such as Calypso, which had gained popularity in the early 1950s.

Around 1953, while performing in Chicago, a strong wind damaged their home in Evanston, Wyoming. After canceling their appearance, they traveled to California and purchased a house in Sun Valley, limiting their travels to the West Coast. In 1958, they released a religious album, with each song dedicated to different religions around the world, including Hinduism, Christianity, and Islam. In 1959, they performed in a year-long spectacle at the Lamplighter Lounge in Corvallis, Oregon.

By 1957, they began frequently touring the central Oregon coast under contract with one of the largest nightclubs in Portland. The owner of a new motel and lounge complex in Depoe Bay, Oregon, wanted them to entertain there on a part-time basis. During their first visit, Zarate saw a "For Sale" sign on two concrete oxen standing outside a small green house called "Trails End" on six acres of brushland between Lincoln City and Depoe Bay. He suggested they buy the property, but Paquita disagreed, saying, "Yes, here in the middle of nowhere." The sign was still there during their second visit, and Zarate and Paquita decided to buy the property in 1959. They built a new house and placed the oxen on either end of the driveway that loops off Highway 101. They also built a studio where Zarate could teach violin, guitar, piano, flute, and organ—skills he had mastered over the years. Paquita gave lessons in dance and multiple languages. Additionally, they opened an adjoining restaurant, The Gingerbread House, which served traditional Mexican and Indian cuisine. Children were allowed without charge to encourage more students and guests. Several students enrolled at the Happy Village Cultural Center.

The institution, however, was not profitable, especially as Paquita became too involved with the children, which worsened her health—already debilitated by diabetes, according to Zarate. To keep things running, they made numerous appearances over the years at the popular Amato's Supper Club and the King Surf Beach Resort's Pagan Hut restaurant. Zarate also performed at weddings across Oregon, and they both entertained at gatherings hosted by the elite of the West Coast. This helped generate enough income to maintain their small estate.

In the spring of 1962, in Wecoma Beach (now Lincoln City), they performed in an International Music Recital, presenting their varied repertoire of dances and songs in numerous languages and on various instruments. Their stage appearances became minimal for many years afterward, except for their annual appearances in Mexico during the spring and winter. After 1965, they also began performing annually at the Salishan Bar & Grill.

Paquita watched as cars sped by their home, troubled by the thought that people were in such a hurry. She wanted to provide a place where they could pull over for a few minutes and "give their souls a chance to catch up with them." Zarate wanted to wait until her health improved, so they could build it together. Myrtle "Paquita" Zarate died on November 10, 1968, from complications related to diabetes.

In her honor, Zarate immediately built a small white chapel on the property among the pines he had planted. He hardly left, except to visit relatives in Mexico during the winter. The Fine Arts School continued to operate but seems to have attracted fewer students than before her death. Samuel Zarate continued performing across Oregon and Mexico until his death in 1997.
