= Úrsula López =

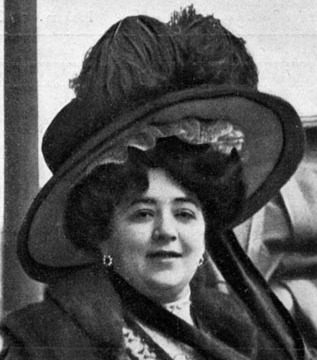
- Born: 31 October 1870; Las Palmas, Spain
- Died: 3 September 1966 (aged 95); Madrid, Spain
- Other names: Úrsula Falcón Quintero
- Occupation: Singer
- Spouse: Luis Bellido Hortelano (m. 1896; died 1941)
- Children: Luis Bellido Falcón

Úrsula López (31 October 1870 – 3 September 1966), stage name Úrsula Falcón Quintero, was a Spanish zarzuela and variety singer and businesswoman. In addition to performing, she was known for her glamorous public image, often flaunting expensive clothes, jewelry, and an automobile.

== Biography ==
=== Cuba and Mexico ===
Úrsula López was born in Las Palmas in the Canary Islands. The date of her birth is not known with certainty. It is listed as 31 October 1886 on her National Identity Document (DNI), but her marriage certificate (she married Luis Bellido Hortelano in the parochial church of the Holy Spirit of Havana) gives her age as 25 on 29 April 1896, so she may have been born on 31 October 1870.

In 1899, once the Cuban War of Independence was over, López moved to Mexico as a flamenco singer, beginning a successful artistic career. It was there that she gave birth to her son Luis Bellido Falcón on 15 July 1903.

According to Mexican critic and chronicler Manuel Mañón, "the year 1903 ended with the farewell of the soprano Úrsula López, who left for Veracruz, heading to Spain, after a long performance at the Teatro Principal."

The 15 November 1906 issue of the Madrid magazine El Arte de El Teatro dedicates its cover to her, with a photo caption reading "Úrsula López, the first comic soprano to act at Mexico's Teatro Principal."

=== Success in Madrid ===
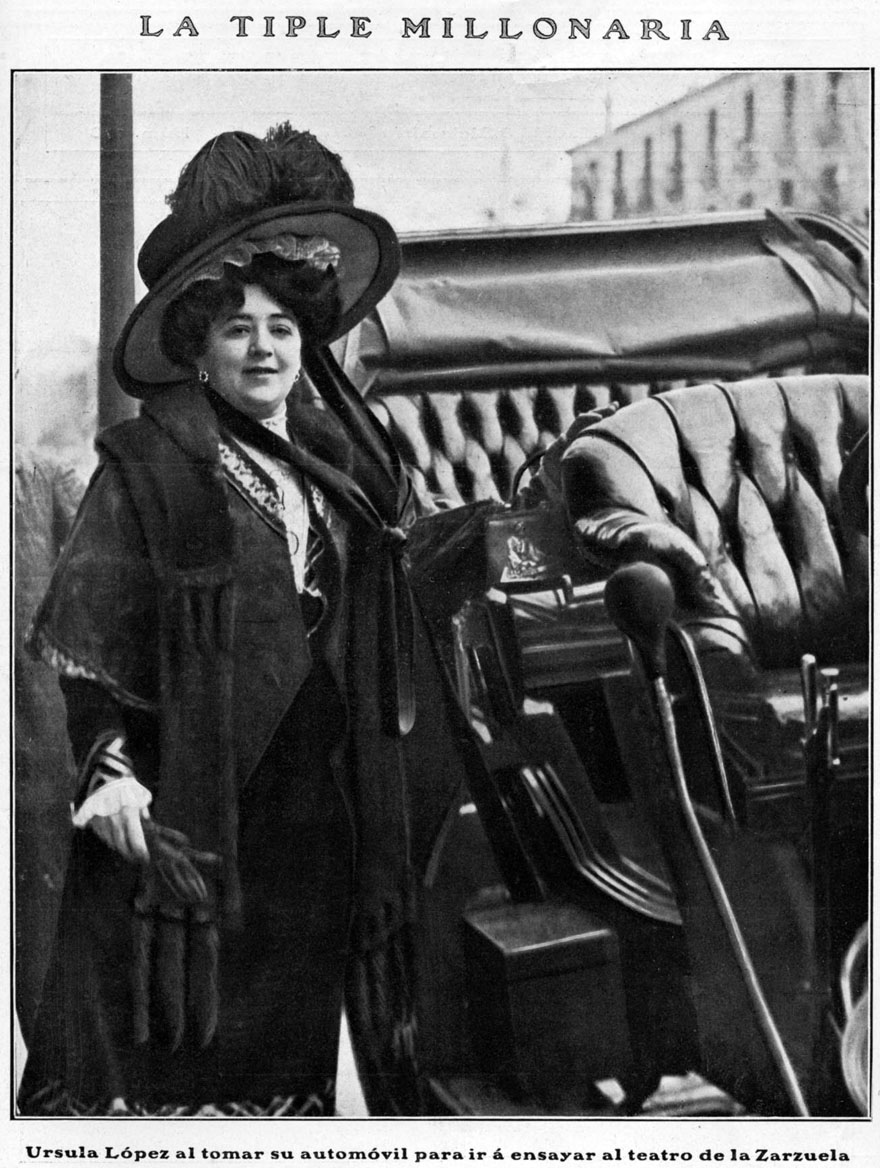
Úrsula López with her automobile in Madrid

On 2 November 1908, López debuted at the Teatro de la Zarzuela in Madrid with San Juan de Luz, a comedy by Quinito Valverde and José Jackson Veyán, and in that same program, the revue Enseñanza libre by Gerónimo Giménez with libretto by Perrín and Palacios. Also in November, she performed in the play La Manzana de Oro at the Jovellanos Street Coliseum, with music by Rafael Calleja Gómez and Tomás Barrera and a book by Gabriel Briones. In it, she played the role of "La Menta", singing cuplés, which proved to be very popular. She was also part of the revue A.B.C., replacing Emérita Álvarez Esparza.

The Spanish press began devoting a large amount of coverage to López, on subjects such as her luxury car, her jewelry, her shawls from Manila, her virtues as an artist, and her wealth. On 21 December 1908, she returned to Mexico, to liquidate her belongings in that country with the intention of leasing a theater in Madrid.

== Úrsula López Zarzuelas Company ==
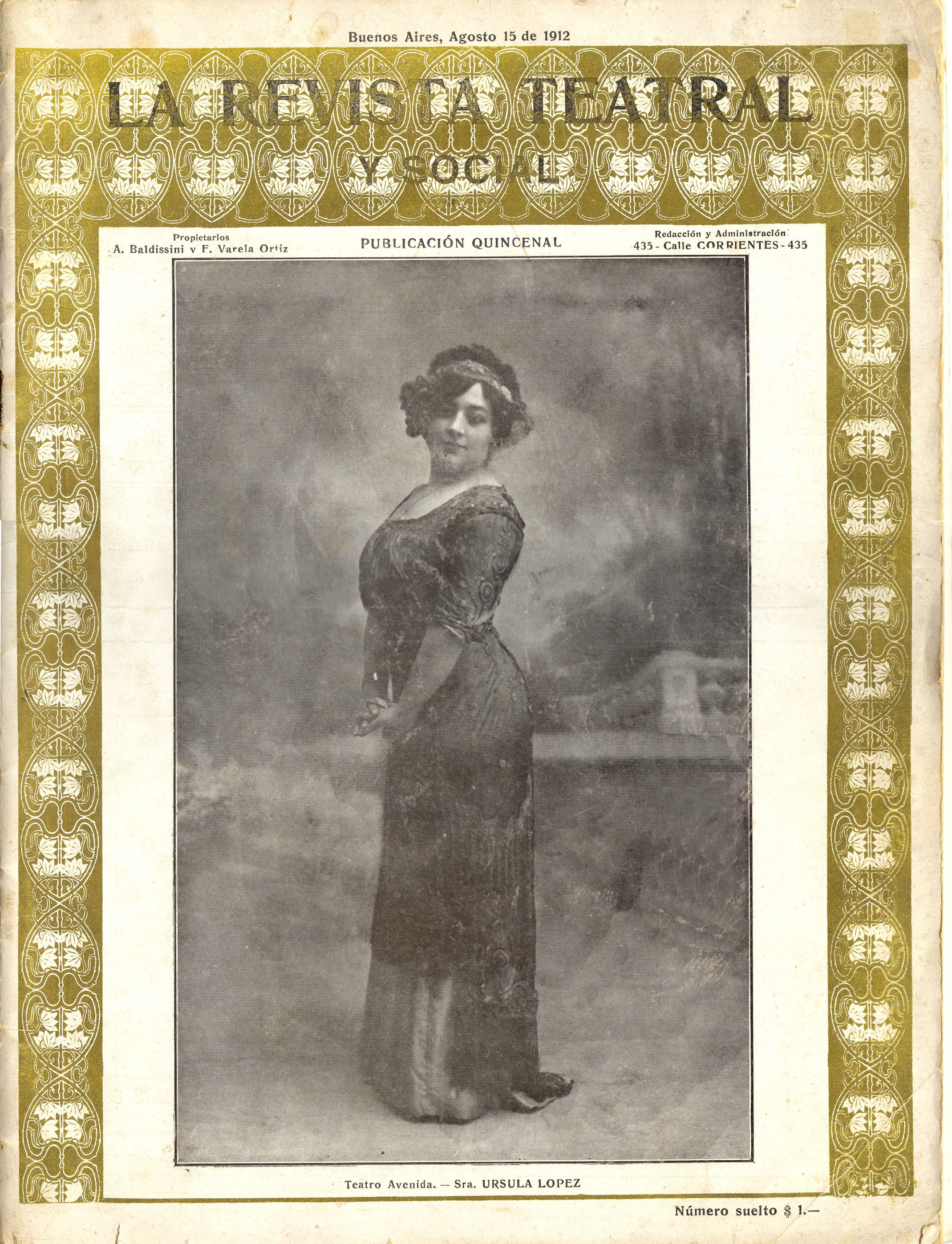
Úrsula López on the cover of La revista teatral y social, Buenos Aires, 15 August 1912

Upon their return from Mexico, Luis Bellido and Serafín Pozueta set up a company to rent the Teatro Lírico, beginning the season on 1 March 1910 with the Úrsula López Zarzuelas Company, and presenting the plays Cinematógrafo nacional, Los mosqueteros, La taza de té, and La manzana de oro, to great success with the public and critics.

After a string of successful premieres, at the end of 1911, they left the Teatro Lírico. The Úrsula López Zarzuelas Company was hired by the playwright and businessman José López Silva and traveled to Argentina. Their performance at the Avenida Theatre in Buenos Aires in 1912 was a hit, after which they traveled to Montevideo. In addition to Úrsula López, the company included well-known soprano Amparo Taberner and stage director Casimiro Ortas.

The 15 July 1912 issue of the biweekly Buenos Aires publication La revista teatral y social devotes an extensive article to López, and its 15 August issue features her photograph on its cover.

Back on the peninsula in 1913, Luis Gabaldón published an interview with López in Blanco y Negro, in which she talks about her future projects. Nuevo Mundo magazine included a photograph of her in February. In August 1913, she began a tour of Spain, performing at the Aza Vital Theater in Málaga with La Generala, book by Perrín and Palacios and music by Amadeu Vives. On 21 December 1913, the company debuted in Seville, at the Teatro Cervantes, and the following day they premiered La boda de la farruca, with a book by Gonzalo Cantó and Guillermo Hernández Mir and music by Francisco Alonso. They then went to Barcelona, acting at the Teatro Cómico, and continuing with a successful tour of the Spanish provinces.

On 14 March 1914, the Úrsula López Company embarked on the steamship Infanta Isabel, heading to Buenos Aires. But this American tour was unsuccessful, causing López and Luis Bellido great economic losses, so they returned to Spain.

== Variety shows ==
López decided to present herself as a divette of variety shows before the Spanish public, debuting at the Teatro Lírico on 15 September 1915. She performed in prominent halls and theaters in Spain, achieving success equal to or greater than she had with zarzuelas. In 1918, she fulfilled some commitments abroad and then retired from the stage, dedicating herself to travel and enjoying her great fortune. In an interview with journalist Mario Hernández in the 5 September 1953 issue of Crítica magazine, she confesses: "Those jewels...that money, the wind took it away. Well, the wind did not take it so much as Paris – the Paris of that time and the theater business. I lived very well, for everything great, and that, it costs a lot of money."

== Later life ==
She established her residence in Madrid, at "Villa Úrsula" in the Ciudad Lineal. Upon the death of her husband Luis Bellido Hortelano in 1941, she left this villa, and on the advice of some friends, moved to a large house on the Calle de Santa Engracia. There, with the help of her sister Reyes Falcón Quintero, she set up a luxuriously decorated boardinghouse named "Pensión Falcón". There she would enjoy her final years.

Úrsula López died in Madrid on 3 September 1966. Writer Carlos Fortuny penned a three-page obituary in ABC, placing her among "the forgotten goddesses", and calling her the "topmost soprano".

== Works premiered at the Teatro Lírico ==
Date	Title	Librettist(s)	Composer(s)	Cast
9 April 1910	La corza blanca	José Jackson Veyán and Antonio L. Rosso	Arturo Saco del Valle and Crespo	Salvador Videgain, Srta. Campos
16 April 1910	Ideal japonés	Eduardo Haro and J. Martín López	Teodoro San José	Úrsula López, Trinidad Rosales, Salvador Videgaín
29 April 1910	El país de las hadas	Guillermo Perrín and Miguel de Palacios	Rafael Calleja Gómez	Úrsula López, Salvador Videgain, Manolita Rosales, Trinidad Rosales
20 May 1910	La costa azul	Miguel Mihura Álvarez and Ricardo González	López Montenegro	Úrsula López, Salvador Videgain, and Sr. Sirvent
25 June 1910	El poeta de la vida	Antonio Martínez Viérgol	Rafael Calleja Gómez	Úrsula López.
18 November 1910	Las romanas caprichosas	José López Silva and Ramón Asensio Mas	Manuel Penella	Úrsula López, Sr. Latorre.
7 December 1910	La reina de las tintas	Miguel Mihura Álvarez and Ricardo González	Manuel Penella	Úrsula López
17 December 1910	La neurastenia de Satanás		Arturo Saco del Valle	Úrsula López, Trinidad Rosales, Manolita Rosales
8 April 1911	Las dos reinas	Sinesio Delgado	Rafael Calleja Gómez and Tomás Barrera	Úrsula López, Carmen de Andrés, and Casimiro Ortas
21 April 1911	La tierra del sol	Guillermo Perrín and Miguel de Palacios	Rafael Calleja Gómez	Úrsula López, Paquita Correa
24 May 1911	La niña de los besos		Manuel Penella	Úrsula López
4 July 1911	El carro del sol	Maximiliano Thous	José Serrano	Úrsula López, Casimiro Ortas, Caridad Álvarez
29 July 1911	El viaje de la vida	Manuel Moncayo	Manuel Penella	Úrsula López, Sr. Rosell
8 August 1911	El género alegre	Carlos Arniches, Ramón Asensio Mas, Enrique García Álvarez	Manuel Penella	Úrsula López, Caridad Álvarez, Sr. Latorre
22 November 1911	El paraguas del abuelo	Guillermo Perrín and Miguel de Palacios	Rafael Calleja Gómez and Pablo Luna	Úrsula López

== Discography ==
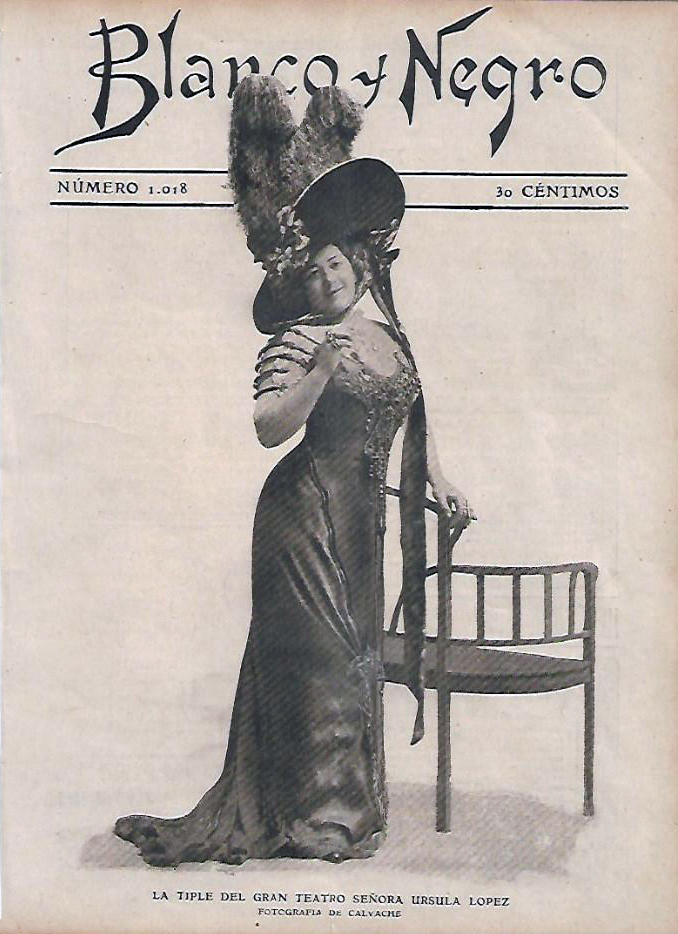
Cover of Blanco y Negro (1910)

- Disco pizarra. 2 sides. Discopathe, num. 2401, 85474, 80 rpm. "Su Majestad el Schotiss", 1st part and 2nd part.
- Disco pizarra, 1 side. Gramophone disc, num. 264075, 80 rpm. Madrid. "La reina de las tintas", "Tango del picazón".
- Teatro y Varietés, Vol. 3 Cómicos y género chico. Remastered recordings. Track 18, "La reina de las tintas", "Picazón". Track 19, El "jipi", from El país de las hadas
- El país de las hadas
- La reina de las tintas
