= Music of Aragon =

Music of a geographical region

The music of Aragon has through history absorbed Roman, Celtic, Moorish and French influences, among others, much like its culture. Traditional instruments used in the region include bagpipes, drums, flutes, tambourines, rattles and, perhaps most distinctively, the guitarro and bandurria.

Jota is the best-known style of music from Aragon. While regionally emblematic to Aragon, the Jota is also danced in most regions of Spain, unlike for instance flamenco which until recently was uniquely regional to Andalucia and some neighbouring areas. The Jota is played instrumentally, danced, and sung.

Other genres of traditional Aragonese music include albadas and rondas.

Some of the most notable Spanish cupletistas were born in Aragon in the first decades of the 20th century. Raquel Meller became a major international star. Other important cupletistas included Preciosilla, Paquita Escribano, Matilde Aragón, Mercedes Serós, one of the creators of the Catalan couplet, Ofelia de Aragón and Elvira de Amaya.

Recent artists with folk influences include José Antonio Labordeta, La Bullonera or Joaquín Carbonell. In Pop and Rock music, the most popular groups have been Héroes del silencio and Amaral.
