= Daniel Haynes =

Dan, Danny or Daniel Haynes may refer to:

- Daniel L. Haynes (1889–1954), American film and stage actor
- Dan Haynes (born 1949), American baseball player in 1967 Major League Baseball draft#First round selections
- Danny Haynes (born 1988), English footballer
