= Julia Fons =

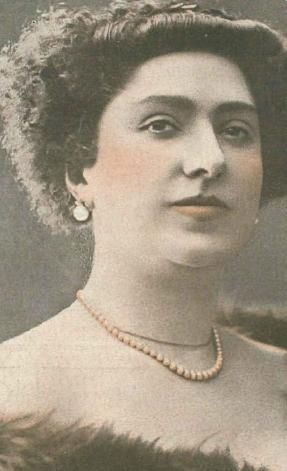
Julia Fons (1910)

Julia Fons de Checa (1882 – 4 January 1973) was a singer and cupletista from Spain.

== Early life ==
Born in Seville, she moved to Madrid at the age of eight.

== Career ==
Julia Fons was popular during the first quarter of the 20th century, when the género chico, operetta, cuplé, and zarzuela were favored, cultivating these genres. In 1903, she joined the Casimiro Ortas Company and was a notable performer of Madrid's Teatro Eslava. She died in Madrid in 1973.
