= The Eternal Mother (1917 film) =

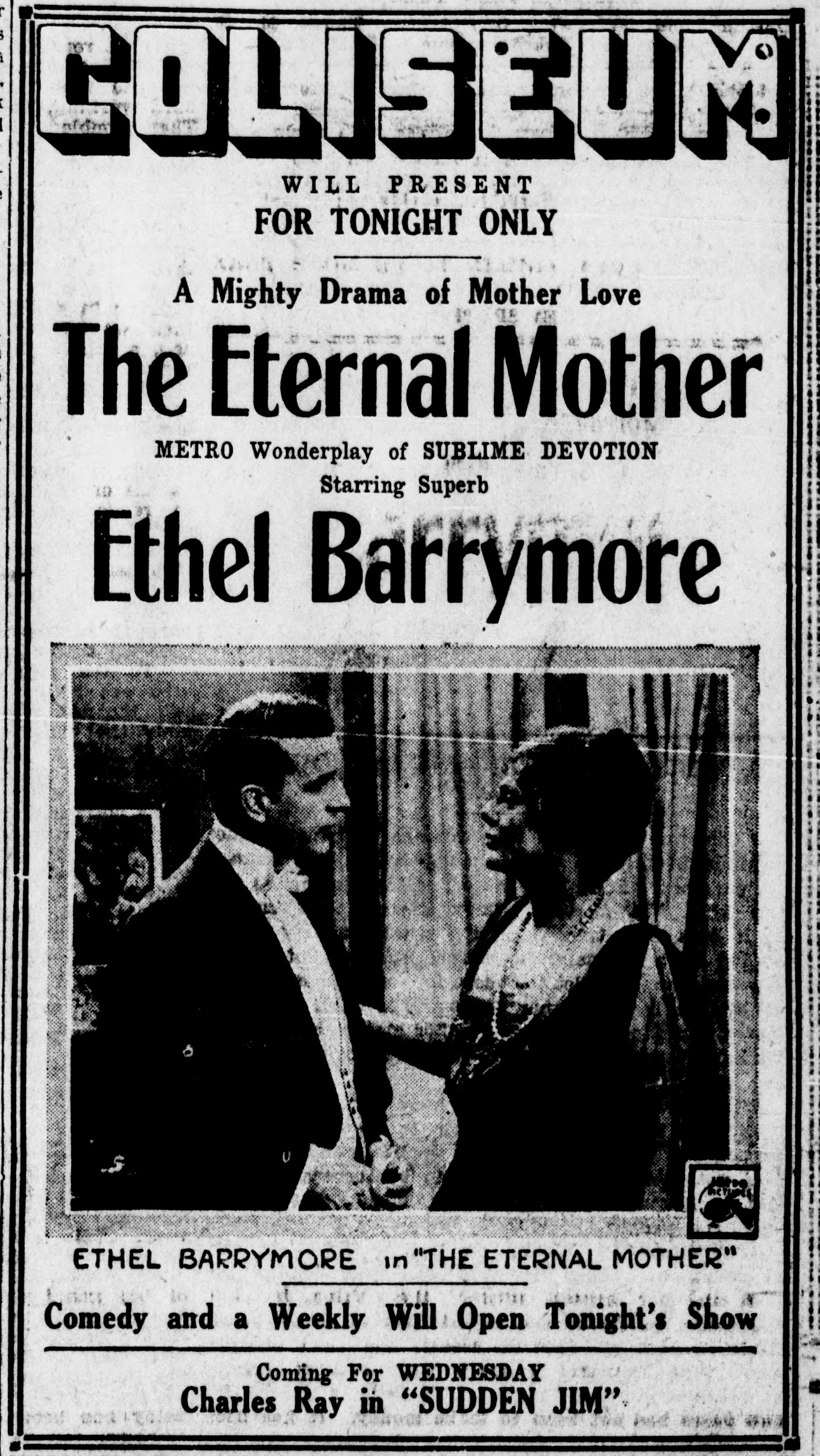
- Newspaper advertisement
- Directed by: Frank Reicher
- Written by: Mary Murillo (scenario)
- Based on: Red Horse Hill by Sidney McCall
- Produced by: Metro Pictures
- Starring: Ethel Barrymore
- Cinematography: George Webber
- Distributed by: Metro Pictures
- Release date: November 26, 1917
- Running time: 50 minutes
- Country: United States
- Language: Silent (English intertitles)

The Eternal Mother is a surviving 1917 American silent drama film directed by Frank Reicher and stars Ethel Barrymore. The picture is taken from a novel, Red Horse Hill, by Sidney McCall, an alias for Mary McNeill Fenollosa.

== Plot ==
As described in a film magazine, Maris (Barrymore) endeavors to persuade her husband Dwight Alden (Mills) to replace the children working in his mills with men and women, but Alden does not listen to his wife's pleas. One night a little girl is injured and Maris, calling on her, discovers that she is her own daughter from a previous marriage who she thought was dead. She finds that her former husband, whom she also believed to be dead, is still living. Maris returns to her home, unable to forget her little girl. When the girl runs away from her father and comes to Maris, Maris leaves Alden, explaining her reasons in a letter. Alden learns that Maris' former husband secured a divorce so that he might marry another woman. With this evidence, and after clearing his factories of child workers, Alden goes to Maris and begs her and her child to return home with him.

== Preservation status ==
- A copy has been id'd in the Bois d'Arcy archive.

== Cast ==
- Ethel Barrymore as Maris
- Frank Mills as Dwight Alden
- J. W. Johnston as Lynch (credited as Jack W. Johnston)
- Charles Sutton as Minister (credited as Charles W. Sutton)
- Kaj Gynt (pseudonym of Karin Sophia Matthiessen; née Karin Sophia Cederstrand; 1885–1956) as Kate
- Louis Wolheim as Bucky McGhee (credited as Louis R. Wolheim)
- Maxine Elliott Hicks as Felice
- J. Van Cortlandt as Butler
