= La Chelito =

Cuban-born Spanish entertainer (1885–1959)

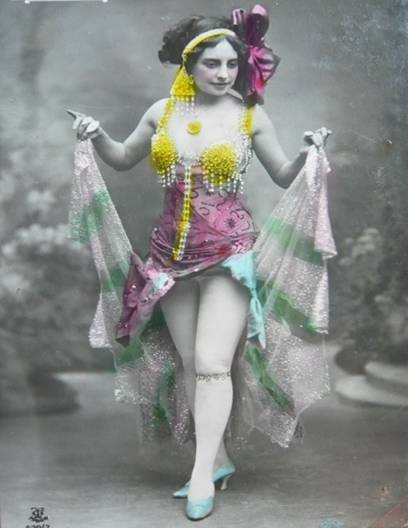
- Portela-Audet in the early 20th-century
- Born: Consuelo Portela Audet; 1885; Placetas, Las Villas, Cuba
- Died: 20 November 1959 (aged 73–74); Madrid, Spain
- Other names: Consuelo Portela-Audet, Consuelo Portela, La Bella Chelito
- Occupations: Cuplé singer, business person

Consuelo Portela Audet (1885–1959), commonly called La Bella Chelito and La Chelito, was a Cuban-born Spanish cuplé singer from the early 20th-century, and a theater business owner. She was a pioneer in the genre of picaresque cuplé.

== Biography ==
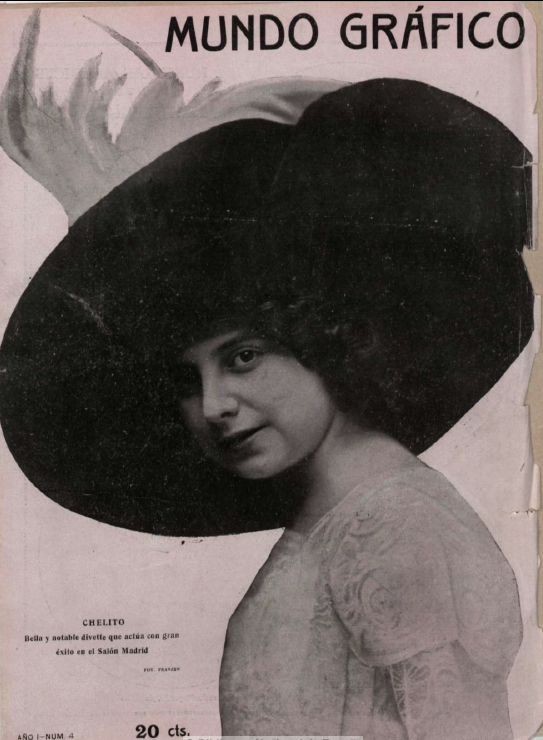
La Chelito

She was born in Placetas, Las Villas, Cuba, to Spanish parents Antonia Audet and Isidro Portella. Her father was the captain of the Civil Guard in Cuba. She started singing at the age of 14, while living in Cuba and performed at the Payret, Molino Rojo and Alhambra theaters. She had critics including clergy, who labeled her as “libidinous satan” in the Diario de la Marina, the Cuban newspaper.

In 1910, her family returned to Spain. She performed mostly in the theaters in Barcelona and Madrid. In 1915, an erotic novel about the life of Chelito was written by Joaquín Belda in the work "La Coquito"; which was later made into a 1977 film of the same name, released in Spain. Her only film appearance was in the silent film El Conde Maravillas (1927) by José Buchs.

After she retired from stage in 1928, she built and managed the Muñoz Seca Theater in Plaza del Carmen, Madrid in 1930. She also owned and managed the Salón Madrid; the Hall Encomienda, which became, after a reform, the Teatro Nuevo; and the Kursaal that she acquired in 1919 and renamed the Chanteclair.

Other notable "Queens of cuplé" were La Fornarina and Raquel Meller.
