= Mae Barnes =

American singer (1907–1996)

- Born: Edith Mae Stith; January 23, 1907 (uncertain); New York City, United States
- Died: December 13, 1996 (aged 89) New York City, United States
- Genres: Jazz, blues, show tunes
- Occupations: Singer, dancer, entertainer
- Years active: 1919–1980s

Mae Barnes (born Edith Mae Stith, possibly January 23, 1907 – December 13, 1996) was an American jazz singer, dancer and comic entertainer. She was responsible for introducing the Charleston dance to Broadway in the 1924 revue Runnin' Wild. After her career as a dancer ended, she became a successful nightclub singer and recording artist.

== Biography ==
She was born in New York City. There is some uncertainty over her year of birth. Most sources give 1907, but blues researchers Bob Eagle and Eric LeBlanc give 1892, based on 1900 and 1910 US census records, though the 1892 date would suggest that she died at the age of 104.

Around 1919, she left school, purportedly to move to Cleveland, Ohio, but instead started working as a chorus girl. Developing expertise as a singer and tap dancer, she worked in vaudeville and toured the south in such shows as Bon Bon Buddy Jr. and Dinah. In 1924, she made her Broadway debut in Runnin' Wild, in which she introduced the Charleston dance, and became known as "the bronze Ann Pennington".

On her second tour, in Shuffle Along (1927), the entertainer Bill "Bojangles" Robinson called her "the greatest living female tap dancer". She was in the 1927 Broadway production of Rang Tang, as well as the Broadway production of Rainbow, with Charlie Ruggles, wherein she danced an "insanely comic" version of the Black Bottom. She continued to perform as a dancer and entertainer in Broadway shows, including the Ziegfeld Follies and Hot Rhythm, and toured on the Keith vaudeville circuit through most of the 1930s.

In 1938, she broke her pelvis in an automobile accident. This effectively ended her career as a dancer, and she diverted her energies into singing. She sang in nightclubs in Hollywood, Honolulu, and New York City, including a seven-year residency at the Boite in Greenwich Village, and at clubs in Park Avenue. In the late 1940s she featured at parties including those hosted by socialite Elsa Maxwell, and gave fundraising benefit shows for hospitals. She toured Europe in 1950, and stayed in London to take the lead in Jack Hylton's revue, Knight of Madness.

After returning to New York in 1951, she became the main attraction at the Bon Soir club on Eighth Street, accompanied by a vocal group, the Three Flames (Tiger Haynes, Roy Testamark and Averill Pollard). They attracted the attention of Ahmet and Nesuhi Ertegun of Atlantic Records, who issued Barnes's first EP in 1953 and an LP, Fun with Mae Barnes, the following year. She was accompanied by Garland Wilson and the Three Flames, and the songs included "(I Ain't Gonna Be No) Topsy", a celebration of black pride, and "On the Sunny Side of the Street", which became her signature song. She became well known for her "sassy" song interpretations, and for "her irreverent interpolations into familiar lyrics".

In the mid-1950s she appeared regularly on TV variety shows, and headlined at the Apollo Theatre. She recorded another album, Mae Barnes, on which she was backed by a jazz group led by trumpeter Buck Clayton, in 1958 for Vanguard Records. Although it was not successful, she continued as a popular live act, and in 1960 the Erteguns recorded her performance at the Playboy Club for a further album, although it remained unreleased. In 1959 she appeared in the Harry Belafonte film Odds Against Tomorrow as a club singer. She continued to perform in clubs through the 1970s and 1980s, and featured in a documentary, Wild Women Don't Have the Blues, in 1987.

Mae Barnes died from cancer in hospital in New York in 1996 (not Boston in 1997, as reported in some sources). She left no close relatives.

== Discography ==
- Fun with Mae Barnes (Atlantic, 1954) accompanied by Garland Wilson and the Three Flames
- Mae Barnes (Vanguard, 1958) recording supervisor: John Hammond; accompanied by Ray Bryant, piano and others
