= Fornarina (singer) =

La Fornarina
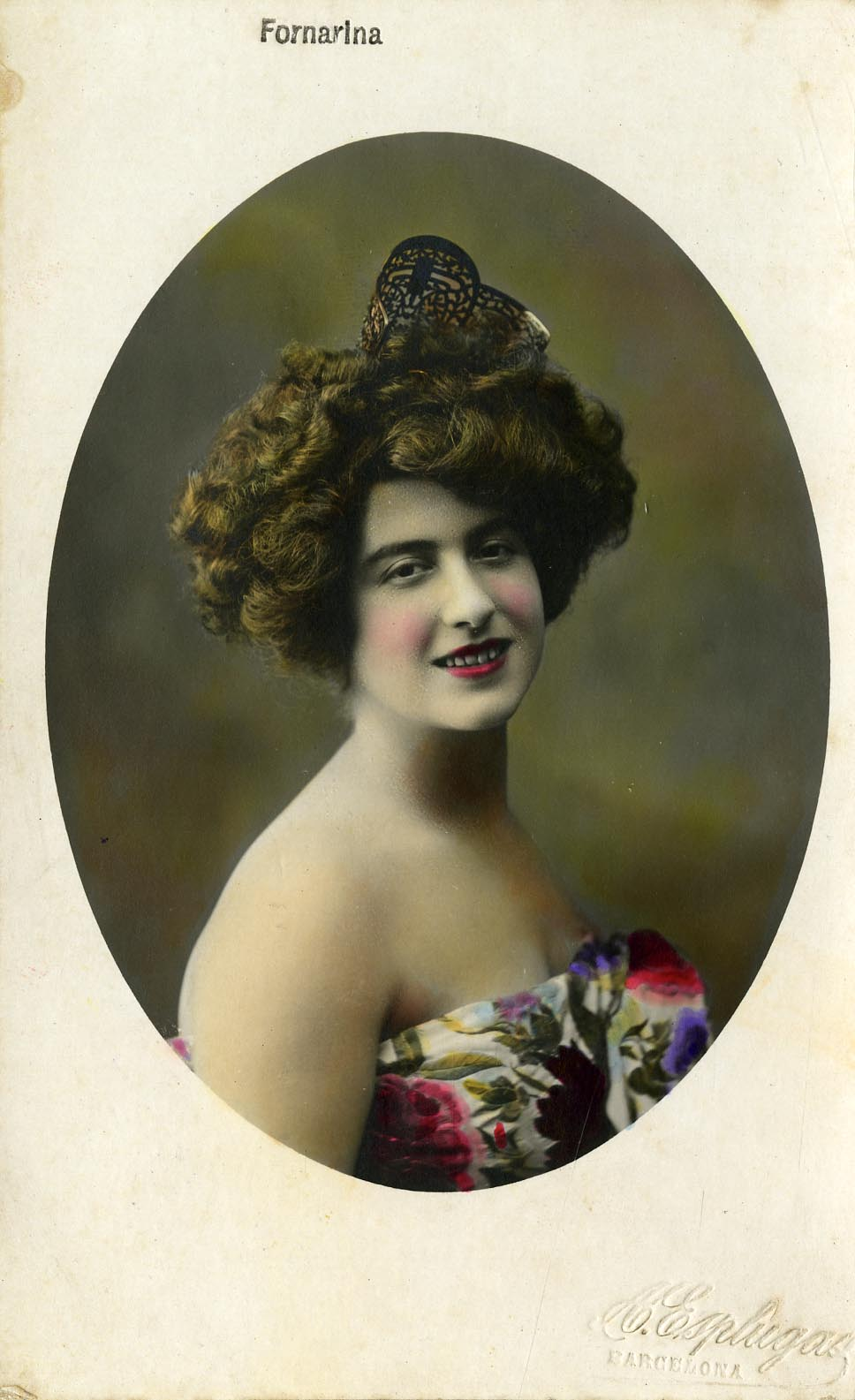
- Coloured portrait by Antoni Esplugas, from the Centro de Documentación y Museu de las Artes Escénicas (MAE) in Barcelona.

Background information
- Born: Consuelo Vello Cano; 28 May 1884; Madrid, Spain
- Died: 17 July 1915 (aged 31) Madrid, Spain
- Genre: Cuplé
- Occupation: Singer
- Label: Gramófono

María del Consuelo Vello Cano, known as La Fornarina (28 May 1884 – 17 July 1915), was a Spanish singer. She was a cuplé singer whose short career –barely 15 years– nevertheless brought her fame throughout Spain and Europe. Among her admirers were Jacinto Benavente and the brothers Antonio and Manuel Machado.

== Biography ==
Daughter of the Civil Guard Laureano Vello Álvarez and the laundress Benita Cano Rodríguez.

Her first notable appearances were as chorus girl in the Teatro de la Zarzuela in Madrid and her presence is also documented in the capital's Teatro Japonés around 1900. She apparently owed her nickname, "La Fornarina" (the baker girl) to the La Época journalist Javier Betegón. She already appeared under the name at the Teatro Romea in Madrid, the Teatro Nuevo Retiro in Barcelona and the Salon Novedades in Valencia. From 1904, she became associated with the lyricist José Juan Cadenas.

Her appearances abroad can be traced to 1905, in Lisbon's Coliseu dos Recreios. Soon, she became the star of the Teatro Lara, the Salón de Novedades and the Zarzuela in Madrid as well as the Príncipe Real theatre in Porto. Her grand entrance on the international scene was at the Parisian "Apollo Théatre" in 1907. It is in Paris that she meets Quinito Valverde, author of the song Clavelitos (Little Carnations) (1909) that would become her greatest success. With this song she trod the boards of London's Alhambra Theatre, the Olympia in Paris or the Palais Soleil in Montecarlo, even appearing in St Petersburg in 1909. After the long European tour, King Alfonso XIII of Spain presided over one of her appearances at the Teatro de la Comedia.

In 1914, a year before her premature death, she premiered El ultimo cuplé (the last cuplé) (a theme that would inspire the 1957 film The Last Torch Song, starring another Spanish diva, Sara Montiel. Critics of the time wrote that she supplemented her a weak voice with good modulation and "exquisite low notes". She died at the height of her fame, at the age of 31 and is buried in Saint Isidore Cemetery.

Other notable "Queens of cuplé" were La Chelito and Raquel Meller. In 1909, Fornarina achieved widespread acclaim with the song "Clavelitos," composed by Quinito Valverde. The song became her signature piece and contributed significantly to her international fame, leading to performances across Europe, including in Paris and London.
