= Féral Benga =

Senegalese dancer and model (1906–1957)

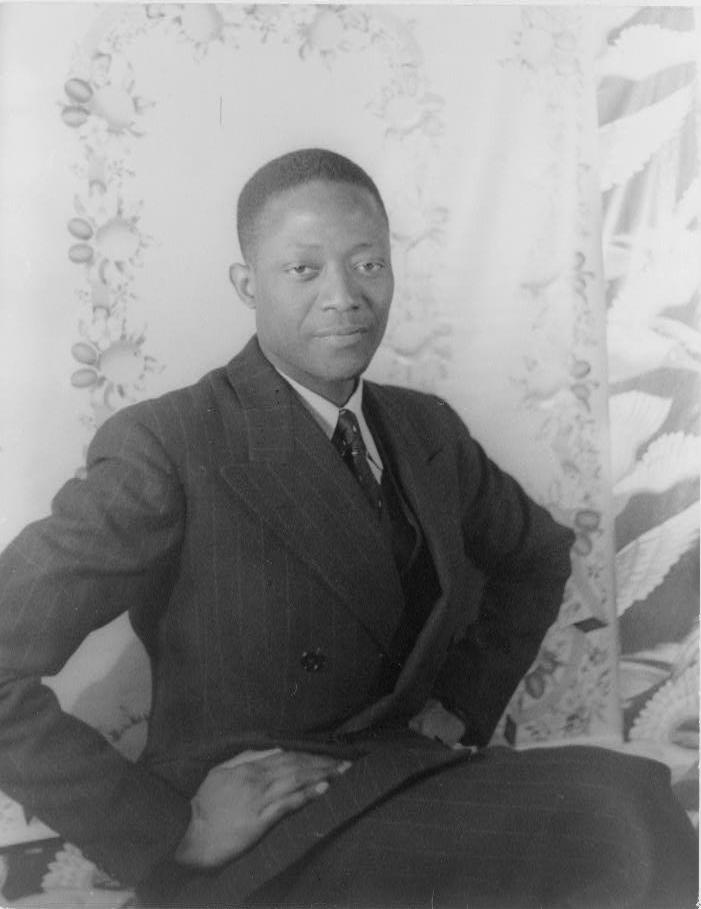
Féral Benga, 1937, by Carl Van Vechten

François "Féral" Benga (8 July 1906 – 13 September 1957) was a Senegalese dancer and became a sought after model of the Harlem Renaissance, his portraits and sculptures taken by Carl Van Vechten, Richmond Barthé and George Platt Lynes among others.

== Biography ==
François "Féral" Benga was the illegitimate grandchild of one of Dakar's wealthiest property owners. Benga left Dakar in 1925 to move to Paris and his father disinherited him.

In 1930, Benga starred in The Blood of a Poet, an avant-garde film directed by Jean Cocteau and financed by Charles de Noailles.

In France, Benga was the Folies Bergère star; for a brief period his dance partner was Myrtle Watkins.

In 1931, in the revue L'usine à folies, Benga appeared in the act Sur le plateau de la négresse (On the Lip of the Negress), starring with the female Malian dancer Melka Soudani.

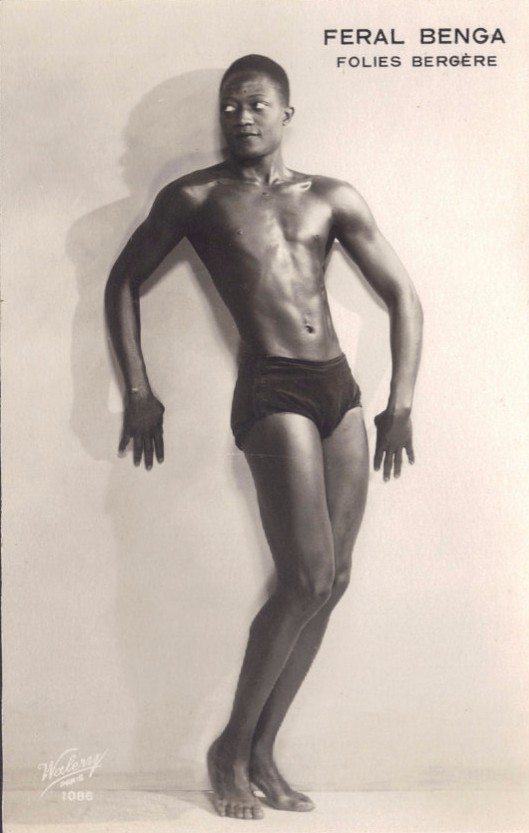
Postcard of Féral Benga in the Folies Bergère by Stanisław Julian Ignacy Ostroróg

In the summer of 1934, Richmond Barthé went on a tour to Paris. This trip exposed Barthé to classical art, but also to performers such as Féral Benga and Josephine Baker. He was thoroughly enchanted by Benga and led to Barthé making a sculpture of Féral Benga in 1935.

In 1935, Benga's partner, Geoffrey Gorer, wrote Africa Dances, dedicated to Benga. It was the result of a trip they made to Africa in 1933 in order to study the native dances. Cyril Connolly would later said "There was only one book I possessed: Geoffrey Gorer's Africa Dances (Faber, 1935) describing a tour he made with the Senegalese dancer Féral Benga before the last war. Benga had opened a night-club in Paris; I had been there and been overwhelmed by the power of his dancing and the magic of his drum-rhythms." Also, in 1935, Benga posed for American sculptor Richmond Barthé's 19 inch high, bronze statue titled Feral Benga. The statue has been described by the Museum of Fine Arts, Boston as Barthé's "signature piece".

In the middle of the 1930s, Benga was painted by James A. Porter, in Soldat Senegalese.

Back in Manhattan, Benga was a gay icon. He moved in the Harlem Renaissance circles and had also a brief affair with Kenneth Macpherson, who was at the time in a relationship with an African-American singer, Jimmie Daniels. In 1938 Benga was painted by Pavel Tchelitchew, and the painting, Deposition was owned by Lincoln Kirstein.

Back in Paris in 1947, Benga owned a bar, La Rose Rouge, at 53 Rue de la Harpe. The club featured an African cabaret, all performers African students in Paris universities. The bar attracted a young clientele, including Nico, Mireille, and Jean Rougeuil, who opened the attached club, Le Club de la Rose Rouge.

Benga is buried in the Saint-Denis cemetery in Châteauroux, France (funeral grant in the division 8 n°18 C - This funeral concession will expire in 2028).
