= Adiós Granada =

Spanish song

"Adiós Granada" ("Farewell, Granada") is a song composed by Tomás Barrera and Rafael Calleja, and made famous by soprano Victoria de los Ángeles in 1958.
