= Lola Montes (singer) =

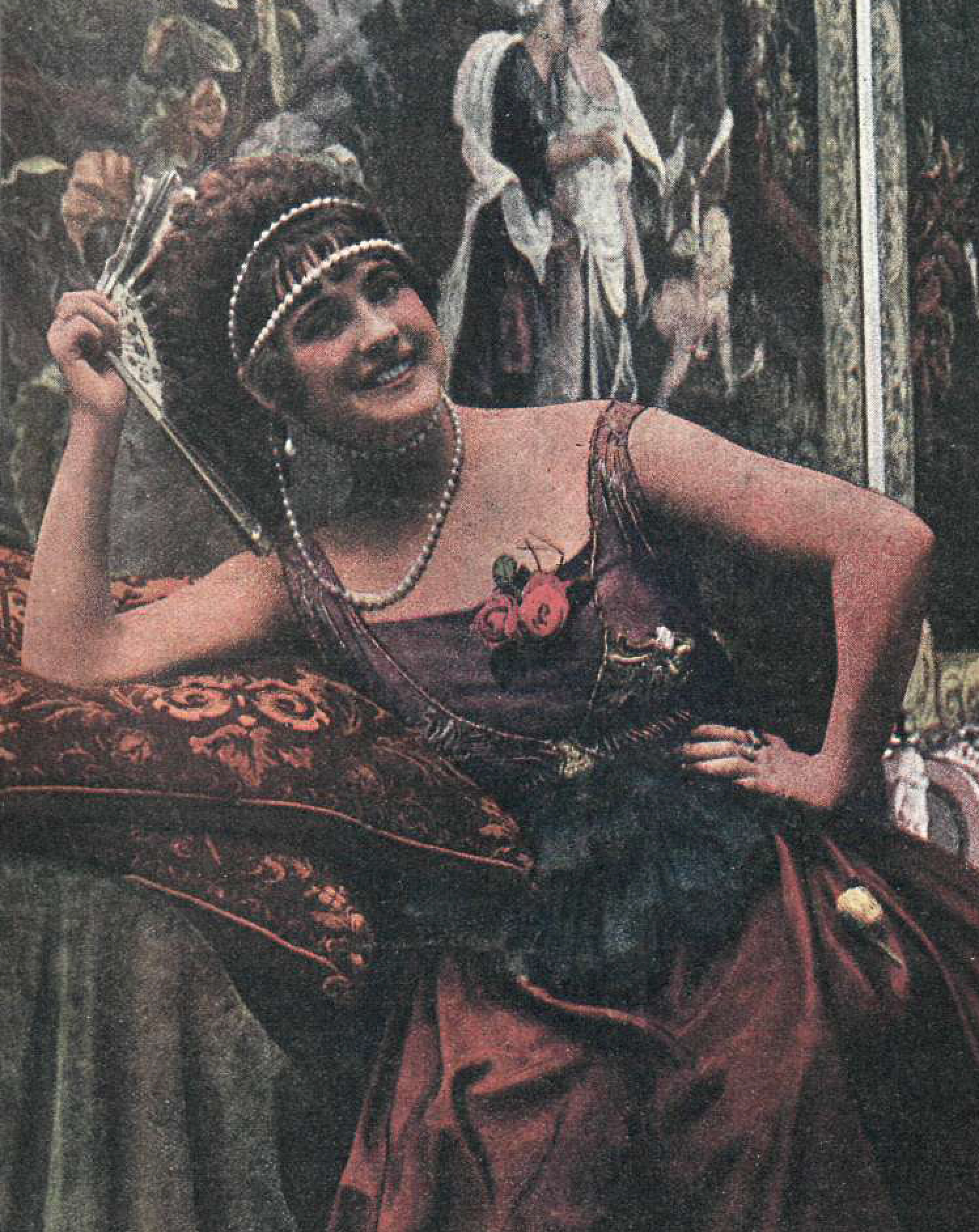
- Lola Montes (1919)

Background information
- Birth name: Mercedes Fernández
- Born: September 24, 1898; Madrid, Spain
- Died: January 18, 1983
- Genres: cuplé
- Occupation: singer

Lola Montes (September 24, 1898 – January 18, 1983) was a Spanish singer whose real name was Mercedes Fernández. She began in the artistic world as a dancer at the Teatro Real in Madrid. Later, she performed as a singer in different Zarzuela performances and still later, she was an interpreter of cuplés. On July 20, 1921, she premiered the cuplé El novio de la muerte at the Teatro Vital in Málaga, with lyrics by Fidel Prado Duque and music by Juan Costa Casals, obtaining enormous success. Shortly after, she performed it in Melilla and the song, after being adapted, became the official hymn of the Spanish Legion.

Throughout her professional career, Montes performed in numerous theaters in Spain, including the Teatro de la Teatro de la Zarzuela, Teatro Apolo in Valencia, Gran Casino in San Sebastián, Teatro Eldorado in Barcelona, Salón Imperial in Seville, and Teatro Circo in Zaragoza. Some of the best-known cuplés that she performed are: El amor de Lili, La Cautiva, and De nena en nena, all of them with music and lyrics by Juan Martínez Abades.

In 1920, she undertook a tour of Latin America, which included Cuba, Costa Rica, Panama, Peru, Bolivia, Brazil, Chile, and Argentina, obtaining great success in Buenos Aires. She retired in 1925.
