= Escape from Devil's Island =

1935 American film by Albert S. Rogell

- Directed by: Albert S. Rogell
- Screenplay by: Earle Snell; Fred Niblo Jr.
- Story by: Fred de Gresac
- Starring: Victor Jory; Florence Rice; Norman Foster; Stanley Andrews; Daniel L. Haynes; Herbert Heywood
- Cinematography: John Stumar
- Edited by: Otto Meyer
- Production company: Columbia Pictures
- Distributed by: Columbia Pictures
- Release date: November 24, 1935
- Running time: 64 minutes
- Country: United States
- Language: English

Escape from Devil's Island is a 1935 American adventure film directed by Albert S. Rogell and written by Earle Snell and Fred Niblo Jr. The film stars Victor Jory, Florence Rice, Norman Foster, Stanley Andrews, Daniel L. Haynes and Herbert Heywood. The film was released on November 24, 1935, by Columbia Pictures.

== Cast ==
- Victor Jory as Dario
- Florence Rice as Johanna Harrington
- Norman Foster as Andre Dion
- Stanley Andrews as Steve Harrington
- Daniel L. Haynes as Djikki
- Herbert Heywood as Bouillon
- Frank Lackteen as Python
- Arthur Aylesworth as Commondante
- Noble Johnson as Bisco
- Paul Guilfoyle as Touvier (uncredited)
