= Pablo Luna =

Spanish composer (1879–1942)

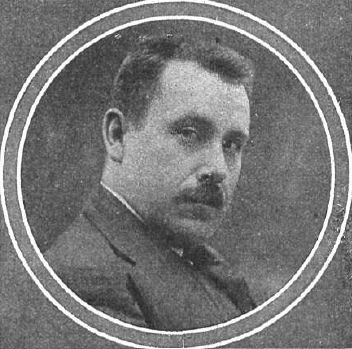
Pablo Luna 1913

Pablo Luna Carné (21 May 1879 Alhama de Aragón – 28 January 1942 Madrid) was a Spanish composer. His best-known composition is the aria "De España vengo" from the zarzuela El niño judío.

== Life ==
Pablo Luna received his first lessons in music theory from an organist at a church in his birthplace, Alhama de Aragón. His father, Pablo Luna Ferrer, who was a member of the Civil Guard, had moved with his family to the valley of the Ebro. He studied harmony with Teodoro Ballo and composition with Miguel Arnaudas. As a violinist, Luna would make money in hotels, cafes, churches and a small chamber orchestra, as well as in theaters. In 1903 he wrote his first operetta, Lolilla, la Petenera which was followed in 1904 by La Escalera de los Duendes (The Ladder of the Elves).

In 1905, he moved to Madrid to learn more about the world of zarzuela. In particular, he contacted Ruperto Chapí, the second director of the Teatro de la Zarzuela, and Tomás Barrera Saavedra, a later director of the orchestra, Jerónimo Giménez y Bellido and others. He also knew the librettist Luis Pascual Frutos, who wrote the libretto for the operetta Mussetta, which premiered successfully in 1908. This operetta was followed by many other stage works.

In Zaragoza premiered with great success 11 March 1911 his zarzuela Molinos de viento (Windmills). Luna was the same who led the orchestra on the night of reopening of the Teatro de la Zarzuela, after a fire, in 1914. In 1918, he released one of his greatest works, El niño Judío (The Jewish Boy), an exponent of the new style full of exoticism and sophistication. In March 1925 a grand concert was given in his honor and he was awarded the gold medal of the city of Zaragoza. He closed the trilogy of his three most successful zarzuelas with Benamor (1928).

He also wrote eleven screenplays under the pseudonym García Sandoval. Pablo Luna has various streets named after him, and has a school with his name in Alhama de Aragón (Zaragoza).

== Works ==
=== Works for orchestra ===
- Una noche en Calatayud, suite-fantasía
- ¡Arre borrico!, jota

=== Works for band ===
- Ballesteros, paso-doble jota
- Danza del Fuego from "Benamor"
- Fantasía from "Molinos de viento"
- Intermedio from "La Pícara Molinera"
- Selección from "El Asombro de Damasco"
- Selección from "El niño judío"
- Selección from "Una noche en Calatayud"

=== Theatrical works ===
Revistas

- 1909 A.C.T., Que se va el tío, (with Tomás Barrera Saavedra)
- 1909 El Club de las solteras, Pasatiempo cómico-Lírico in 1 act and 5 scenes, with libretto by Manuel Fernández del Puente, (with Luis Foglietti)
- 1911 El paraguas del abuelo, cuento fantástico in 1 act (with Tomás Barrera Saavedra) - libretto by Guillermo Perrín y Miguel de Palacios
- 1918 La Mujer artificial o la receta del doctor Miró, 3 acts - libretto by Carlos Arniches and Joaquín Abati
- 1921 La Tierra del Carmen
- 1924 Rosa de fuego Revista in 3 acts - Libretto by Antonio Paso
- 1927 El Fumadero
- 1927 Roxana, la cortesana
- 1929 El Antojo
- 1932 ¡Cómo están las mujeres!, 2 actos - libretto by Francisco García Loygorri
- 1934 Las Peponas
- 1934 Los Inseparables, 2 acto - libretto by Leandro Blanco and Alfonso Lapena
- 1935 Las Ansiosas (with José Ruiz de Azagra)
- 1935 La Colasa del Pavón
- 1935 Al Cantar el gallo
- 1935 Las siete en punto, reportage of a great spectacle in 20 episodes, divided in 2 parts, a prologue an epilogue and an apotheosis - text: Leandro Blanco and Alfonso Lapena
- 1936 Piezas de Recambio, Humorada lírica in 2 acts - libretto by Fernando Neyra and García Sandoval.
- 1936 La sal por arrobas, 2 acts (with Jacinto Guerrero) - libretto by Antonio Paso

Operettas

- 1908 Musseta - libretto by Luis Pascual Frutos
- 1909 La Reina de los mercados, 1 act - libretto by Guillermo Perrín and Miguel de Palacios
- 1910 Molinos de viento, 1 act - libretto by Luis Pascual Frutos
- 1911 La Canción húngara
- 1912 Canto de primavera, 2 acts - libretto by Luis Pascual Frutos
- 1913 es:Los cadetes de la Reina, 1 act
- 1913 La alegría del amor, 1 act - libretto by Ramón Asensio Más and José Juan Cadenas Muñoz
- 1914 La Corte de Risalia
- 1914 El Rey del mundo, 1 act - libretto by José Maria Martín de Eugenio
- 1916 Jack, 3 acts - libretto by Maxim Brody, Franz Martos y Emilio González del Castillo
- 1916 Sybill, 3 acts - libretto by Maxim Brody, Franz Martos and Emilio González del Castillo
- 1916 El Asombro de Damasco, 2 acts - libretto by Antonio Paso Cano and Joaquín Abati, based on a story from the Thousand and One Nights
- 1918 Los Calabreses
- 1921 El Sinvergüenza en Palacio, (with Amadeo Vives)
- 1923 Benamor, 3 acts
- 1939 Flor de Cerezo o La Gata encantada

Zarzuelas

- 1903 Lolilla, la Petenera
- 1904 Escalera de los Duendes
- 1906 La Corte de Júpiter, (with Eduardo Fuentes Parra)
- 1908 Fuente Escondida
- 1908 La Fiesta del Carmen (with Pedro Códoba)
- 1909]Oro y sangre
- 1909 Salón moderno
- 1909 Las Lindas perras, (with Rafael Calleja Gómez)
- 1910 Llevar la derecha
- 1910 Huelga de criadas, (with Luis Foglietti)
- 1910 Vida de príncipe, 1 act, (with Luis Foglietti) - libretto by Antonio López Monís and Ramón Asensio Más
- 1911 El Dirigible, (with Arturo Escobar)
- 1911 Las Hijas de Lemnos
- 1911 Sangre y arena, 1 act (with Pascual Marquina Narro) - libretto by Vicente Blasco Ibáñez, Gonzalo Jover and Emilio Gónzalez del Castillo
- 1911 La Romerito, (with Rafael Calleja Gómez)
- 1912 Las Malas pulgas, (with San Nicolás)
- 1912 La Mujer de su marido
- 1913 Los Cuatro gatos (with Arturo Lapuerta)
- 1913 La Cucaña de Sotanillo
- 1913 La Gloria del vencido, (with Marcelino Amenazavas)
- 1915 La Boda de Cayetana, o una Tarde en Amaniel
- 1915 La Sultana, (with Arturo Lapuerta)
- 1915 Amores de aldea (with Reveriano Soutullo Otero)
- 1916 El Patio de los naranjos, 1 act - libretto by Julio Pellicer y López and José Fernández del Villar
- 1917 La Casa de enfrente, sainete in 1 act - libretto by Serafín Álvarez Quintero and Joaquín Álvarez Quintero
- 1917 Los Patineros, (with Luis Foglietti)
- 1918 El Aduar
- 1918 El niño judío, 2 acts and 4 scenes - libretto by Enrique García Álvarez and Antonio Paso
- 1918 Trini la clavellina
- 1919 La Mecanógrafa
- 1919 Muñecos de trapo, farsa musical in 2 acts - libretto by Antonio Paso
- 1919 Pancho Virondo, zarzuela in 2 acts and 4 scenes - libretto by Enrique García Álvarez and Antonio Paso
- 1920 El suspiro del moro, 1 act (with Eduardo Fuentes Parra) - libretto by Antonio López Monís and Juan López Núñez
- 1921 Los Papiros, zarzuela in 3 acts - libretto by Serafín Álvarez Quintero and Joaquín Álvarez Quintero
- 1921 Su Alteza, se casa
- 1922 Los Apuros de Pura
- 1922 Los Dragones de París
- 1923 La Moza de las campanillas
- 1924 Calixta la prestamista
- 1924 La Joven Turquía
- 1925 La Paz del molino 2 acts, the second in three scenes - Libreto de Manuel Góngora y Miguel Manzano
- 1925 Sangre de Reyes, 2 acts (junto con Francisco Balaguer Muriel) - libretto by Angel Torres del Alamo and Antonio Asenjo Pérez Campos
- 1925 El Tropiezo de la Nati
- 1925 Las Espigas, (with Enrique Bru) (1873–1951)
- 1926 Las Mujeres son así
- 1926 La Pastorela, 3 acts (with Federico Moreno Torroba) - libretto de Fernando Luque and Enrique Calonge
- 1927 El Tiro de pichón
- 1928 La Chula de Pontevedra, sainete in 2 acts (with Enrique Bru) - libretto by Enrique Paradas and Joaquín Jiménez
- 1928 La Manola del Portillo, (with Federico Moreno Torroba)
- 1928 La Pícara molinera, zarzuela in 3 acts - Angel Torres del Alamo and Antonio Asenjo Pérez.
- 1929 El Caballero del guante rojo
- 1929 La Moza vieja, zarzuela in 3 acts - libretto by Federico Romero and Guillermo Fernández Shaw
- 1929 La Ventera de Alcalá, (with Rafael Calleja Gómez )
- 1931 Currito de la Cruz
- 1931 Morena y sevillana
- 1931 Flor de Zelanda- 2 acts - Luis Fernandez de Sevilla and Anselmo C. Carreño
- 1932 Los moscones - sainete in 2 acts - Pedro Lerena and Anselmo C. Carreño
- 1939 Cocktail
- 1939 Una copla hecha mujer
- 1941 Las Calatravas, 3 acts - libretto by Federico Romero and José Tellaeche
- 1944 Pilar de la victoria, (with Julio Gómez)

Other theatrical works

- 1916 El sapo enamorado (the frog in love), pantomime - based on a story by Tomás Borrás
- La Boda de Antón, (with Emilio Acevedo)
- La Rabalera
- La Flor del camino
