= Geoffrey Gorer =

English anthropologist and writer (1905–1985)

- Born: Geoffrey Edgar Solomon Gorer; 26 March 1905; Soho, London, England
- Died: 24 May 1985 (aged 80)
- Education: Charterhouse School; Jesus College, Cambridge
- Occupations: Anthropologist; writer

Geoffrey Edgar Solomon Gorer (26 March 1905 – 24 May 1985) was an English anthropologist and writer, noted for his application of psychoanalytic techniques to anthropology.

== Biography ==
Born into a non-practising Jewish family, Gorer was educated at Charterhouse and at Jesus College, Cambridge.

During the 1930s, he wrote unpublished fiction and drama. His first book was The Revolutionary Ideas of the Marquis de Sade (1934, revised in 1953 and again in 1964 as The Life and Ideas of the Marquis de Sade). He then published an account of a journey he made following Féral Benga in Africa, entitled Africa Dances (1935, new editions 1945: Penguin, 1949, 1962; Eland 2003), which was a considerable success and proved to be a springboard for a career as a writer and anthropologist. After Africa Dances, his career was advanced by the publishers and anthropologists now taking a keen interest in his well-regarded work. Another cultural study followed: Bali and Angkor, or, Looking at Life and Death (1936). Hot Strip Tease appeared in 1937 and Himalayan Village in 1938.

His admiration for George Orwell's novel Burmese Days led him to contact Orwell in 1935. They remained good friends until Orwell's death in 1950.

From 1939, Gorer lived and worked in the United States. He wrote The Americans (1948) and The People of Great Russia (1949).

From 1957, he again worked in England. Exploring English Character, based on a large survey he designed, appeared in 1955. Death, Grief, and Mourning in Contemporary Britain appeared in 1965. The Danger of Equality and other essays (1966) collected some recent papers. Sex and Marriage in England Today appeared in 1971.
