= Rang Tang =

1927 Broadway musical

- Music: Ford Dabney
- Lyrics: Joseph H. Trent
- Book: Kaj Gynt
- Premiere: July 12, 1927: Royale Theater, Broadway – 119 performances (finished at the Majestic Theatre)

Rang Tang is a musical that premiered July 12, 1927, on Broadway at the Royale Theater and ran for 119 performances, including a 14-week overrun, during which, the production moved September 12, 1927, to the Majestic – finishing October 24, 1927. It was acclaimed as one of the most successful black musical revues of the latter 1920s, and owed much to a star-laden cast headlined by Flournoy Miller and Aubrey Lyles. The book — in 2 acts and 12 scenes (2 scenes added later) — is by Kaj Gynt; the lyrics are by Joseph H. Trent; the music is composed by Ford Dabney, who tailored some of the songs for Mae Barnes and Evelyn Preer; the score and post-production music was published by Leo Feist; all copyrighted in 1927 and copyrights renewed in 1954. (Note: Vol. 22; July–December 1927, Nos. 7–12 (1927): 1. "Brown," © 1 c. 15 June 1927; E670045, p. 700; 2. "Come to Africa," © 1 c. 12 July 1927; E672192, p. 705; 3. "Ee Yah," hunting song, © 1 c. 15 June 1927; E670039, p. 712; 4. "Everybody Shout," © 1 c. 15 June 1927; E670034, p. 713; 5. "Feelin' Kinda Good," © 1 c. 12 July 1927; E672191, p. 714; 6. "Harlem," © 1 c. 15 June 1927; E670040, p. 722; 7. "Jubilee in Monkeyland," © 1 c. 15 June 1927; E670041, p. 738; 8. "Jungle Rose," fox trot; © 18 July 1927; 2 c. 20 July 1927; E672315, p. 738; 9. "Jungle Rose," © 1 c. 15 June 1927; E670036, p. 738; 10. "King and Queen," © 1 c. 12 July 1927; E782190, p. 740; 11. "Pay Me," © 1 c. 15 June 1927; E670035, p. 766; 12. "Rang Tang," fox trot; © 18 July 1927; 2 c. 20 July 1927; E672314, p. 771; 13. "Rang Tang," © 1 c. 15 June 1927; E670044, p. 771; 14. "Sammy and Topsy © 1 c. 15 June 1927; E670046, p. 775; 15. "Sammy's Banjo," © 1 c. 15 June 1927; E670037, p. 775; 16. "Six Little Wives," © 1 c. 27 June 1927; E670049, p. 780; 17. "Someday," © 1 c. 15 June 1927; E670038, p. 782; 18. "Sweet Evening Breeze," © 1 c. 12 July 1927; E672189, p. 787; 19. "Voodoo," © 1 c. 15 June 1927; E670043, p. 796; 20. "Zulu Fifth Avenue," © 1 c. 15 June 1927; E670042, p. 805; 21. "Brown," fox trot, © 6 Aug 1927; 2 c. 9 August 1927; E672870, p. 836; 22. "Brown," fox trot, Frank Edward Barry (1883–1937) orchestra arrangement (4to), © 6 August 1927; 2 c. 7 September 1927; E671250, p. 956; 23. "Rang Tang," fox trot, Frank Edward Barry (1883–1937) orchestra arrangement (4to), © 6 September 1927; 2 c. 7 September 1927; E671249, p. 1008; 24. Rang Tang, notice received, 18 October 1927; recorded Vol. 7, p. 150, p. 1170) (Note: Vol. 1; February 1928, No. 2 (1928): 1. Rang Tang, a musical play, © 1 c. 4 February 1928; D82826, p. 44) (Note: Vol. 8, Part 5C, No. 1, January-June 1954 (1954), pps. 20, 26, 59, 63, 66, 70, 92; songs from Rang Tang) (Note: Vol. 8, Part 5C, No. 2, January-June 1954 (1954), pps. 100, 104, 109, 110, 111, 118, 129, 130, 147, 150, 153, 157, 158, 161, 169, 177; songs from Rang Tang)

== History ==
The production premiered 1 month and 22 days after the world's first solo transatlantic flight – from Roosevelt Field, Mineola, Long Island, to Le Bourget Aerodrome, Paris, by Charles Lindbergh. The musical title, Rang Tang, is slang for orangutan.

=== Plot ===
Sam Peck (Miller) and Steve Jenkins (Lyles) are two debt-ridden Jimtown (Note: Jimtown, slang for Jamestown, is a mythical, happy small town in the South – a favorite locale. Jimtown is also the scene in Shuffle Along (1921), Runnin' Wild (1923), Liza (1922), and – according to author Dan Dietz in his 2019 book, The Complete Book of 1920s Broadway Musicals (p. 450) – "close in spirit to Bamville, the locale of The Chocolate Dandies" (1924).) barbers who flee their creditors, steal an airplane, and, in the spirit of Charles Lindbergh, embark on another, further, albeit non-solo, first transatlantic non-stop flight from America to Africa in search of treasure. Toward the end of their destination, however, while in flight, the plane begins to malfunction and the wings fall off. Following a safe emergency splash landing in the sea near Madagascar, they meet (i) the Queen of Sheba (Josephine Hall), (ii) the King of Madagascar (Daniel L. Haynes), and (iii) a Zulu tribe. Peck and Jenkins become involved in series of comedic misadventures with natives and fierce animals in the forests, jungles, and deserts – staged as a mythical, exotic, and, at times, terrifying native land. They find a buried treasure, return to the U.S., and arrive at a Harlem cabaret, where they celebrate in grand style their new status as two of the richest men in the world. (Note: Rang Tang (official program), Majestic Theatre, New York Magazine Program, for the week beginning September 19, 1927)

== Book, lyrics, melodies, arrangements ==
1. Book: Kaj Gynt (1885–1956) (Note: "Svensk Negerrevy På Broadway – ett litet Amerikabrev från en svensk skådespelerska" (Kaj Gynt, cover photo), by Rosa Tillman, Scenen, Tidskrift för teater, musik och film (official publication of the Swedish Theater Association), Issue N° 1, January 1928, cover & p. 15 (courtesy of Project Runeberg); OCLC 236088058, 1084249228. Note: The author, Rosa Tillman (sv) (1895–1975), was a Swedish actress.)
2. Lyrics: Jo Trent (né Joseph Hannibal Trent; 1892–1954)
3. Music: Ford Dabney (1883–1958)
4. Orchestrations and vocal arrangements: Russell Wooding (né Alfred Russell Wooding; 1891–1959)

== Premier production ==
5. Choreography: Charles Davis (né C. Columbus Davis; 1894–1963) ‡ (Note: Charles Davis aka C. Columbus Davis (1894–1963), when he died, was living in Englewood, New Jersey, at 111 Reis Avenue. His big break came as a principal dancer in Shuffle Along, after which, he rapidly rose to notability as a choreographer at the Apollo and Lafayette Theatres in Harlem. He and his wife, Cecile (1898–1975), had two daughters, Meta J. Davis (1919–2012) and Anna L. Davis (1921–2016) (Duke Ellington's Music for the Theatre, by John Childs Franceschina, McFarland & Company, 2000, p. 14; OCLC 469316674))
6. Staging: Flournoy E. Miller (1885–1971)
7. Set design: Olle Nordmark (1890–1973)
8. Costume design: Olle Nordmark
9. Costume execution: Hilarie Mahieu Costumes, Inc. – Hilarie Albert Mahieu (1877–1964)
10. Masks, lantern heads, and shields: H. Foster Anderson
11. Orchestra direction: Ford Dabney
12. Produced by Walker and Kavanagh – Antoinette Walker (maiden; 1874–1970) and husband, Michael Joseph Patrick Kavanagh (1887–1967)

== Opening night cast ==
1. Flournoy E. Miller (1885–1971), as Sam Peck, a barber ‡
2. Aubrey Lyles (1884–1932), as Steve Jenkins, a barber ‡
3. Josephine Hall (née Josephine Allen; born 1890), (Note: Josephine Hall (née Josephine Allen; born January 1890 Denver – DOD not known) was a mezzo-soprano. On June 15, 1918, she married Efbert E. Hall (1893–1932), a trombonist and former sideman with (i) Charles Elgar's Creole Orchestra and (ii) the Ringling Circus Band, under the direction of Roy Pope. Bert was an active member in the New York City Musicians' Union, Local 802. He also founded, in 1927, the Rhythm Club in Manhattan, which flourished when the Clef Club was in decline. Josephine Hall remarried on June 17, 1937, in Manhattan to Charles Rufus Smith. In addition to performing in Rang Tang, she was a frequent star of the Cotton Club and was in the casts of Keep Shufflin' (1928) as Ruth; Music Hath Charms (1934) in an ensemble; and The Hot Mikado (1939) as singer. Beginning around 1929, she was a frequent vocalist on the radio, which included performances with Duke Ellington.) as Queen of Sheba and singer
4. Evelyn Preer (1896–1932)
5. Daniel L. Haynes (1889–1954), as King of Madagascar and chorus member (baritone)
6. Inez Draw, singer
7. Lillian Westmoreland (maiden; 1906–1935), a so-called "double-voiced" talent – the ability to sing both soprano and alto

Barnes, Mack, Jones dance trio

8. Mae Barnes (1907–1996), dancer
9. Lavinia Mack (born about 1908), dancer
10. Byron Jones (1889–1934), dancer (Note: Byron Jones (né Henry Byron Jones; 1889–1934) and Evelyn Keyes (née Evelyn Blanche Keyes; 1908–1990), both dancers, married March 24, 1928, in Manhattan. Their romance began during their participation in Rang Tang. Byron Jones died in Barcelona. Evelyn re-married choreographer Henry LeTang (1915–1907).) (Note: "New York, New York City Marriage Records, 1829–1940" (database), FamilySearch (re: marriage of Henry Byron Jones and Evelyn Blanche Keyes, March 24, 1928, Manhattan, New York), New York City Municipal Archives; FHL microfilm 1653344, cn 13288) (Note: "Dancers to Wed," New York Daily News, Vol. 9, No. 230, March 20, 1928, p. 27 (accessible via Newspapers.com; subscription required))

Cast (continued)

11. Zaidee Jackson (1898–1970), as Magnolia
12. Crawford Jackson
13. Joe Willis
14. Ralph Bryson, dancer

Male chorus

15. Daniel L. Haynes (1889–1954), bass
16. Ambrose Allen
17. Howard Brown
18. C.H. Gordon
19. Gilbert Holland
20. Burble Jackson
21. Snippy Mason (né Arthur Robinson Mason; 1891–1976), tenor ‡
22. Llewellyn Ransom (né Llewellyn Aloysius Ransom; 1901–1972), tenor
23. James E. Strange (né James Easton Strange; 1895–1956), as barbershop customer and chorus member, tenor
24. Joseph Willis
25. Clarence Todd
26. Edwin Alexander
27. George Battles
28. Edward Thompson (né James Edward Thompson; 1898–1960), who, in 1924, married Evelyn Preer

Ladies of the ensemble

29. Le 'Etta' Revells
30. Pauline Jackson
31. Susie Baker
32. Gladyce Bronson
33. Doris Colbert
34. La Valla Cook
35. Inez Draw
36. Teddy Garnette
37. Alice Hoffman
38. Margie Hubbard
39. Frances Hubbard
40. Evelyn Keyes (1908–1990)
41. Marie Mahood (née Marie Hardina Mahood; born 12 May 1904 Queens, NYC), as one of six of wives of Chief Bobo; in 1928, she married Marion W. Griffen (1903–2000)
42. Frankye Maxwell
43. Thelma McLaughlin
44. Marel Miles
45. Thula Ortes
46. Thelma Rhoton
47. Gladys Schell
48. Helen Smith
49. Norma Smith
50. Gomez Boyer
51. Mildred Coleman
52. Leonore Gadsden
53. Isabel Peterson
54. Ethelyn Boyd
55. Irma Miles
56. Marie Simmons
57. Anna Humphrey
58. Gertrude Williams (Note: "Rang Tang," Billboard, August 13, 1927, p. 96 (accessible via Fultonhistory.com; article link))

Ford Dabney's Rang Tang Orchestra
In September 1927, "The Witch Doctor," a new scene by Trent and Dabney was added to the show.

‡ Member of the 1921 Shuffle Along cast

== Songs ==
Rang Tang; OCLC 498710758, 271523208

1. "Rang Tang," fox-trot song; Dabney (music), Trent (words), Frank E. Barry (arrangement); OCLC 76873176
2. "Rang Tang," Dabney (melody), Trent (words)
3. "Brown;" Dabney (music), Trent (words), OCLC 497289093; Zaidee Jackson, vocalist
4. "Come to Africa," Dabney and Trent (words & melody); Josephine Hall, vocalist
5. "Ee Yah," hunting song, Dabney (melody), Trent (words)
6. "Everybody Shout," Dabney and Trent (words & music)
7. "Feelin' Kinda Good," Dabney and Trent (words & melody)
8. "Harlem," Dabney and Trent (words & melody)
9. "Jubilee in Monkeyland," Dabney and Trent (words & melody)
10. "Jungle Rose," Dabney and Trent (words & melody); OCLC 497905707, 911353208; Evelyn Preer, vocalist
11. "Jungle Rose," fox trot, Dabney (music), Trent (words)
12. "King and Queen," Dabney and Trent (words & melody)
13. "Pay Me," Dabney and Trent (words & melody)
14. "Sammy and Topsy," Dabney (melody), Trent (words)
15. "Sammy's Banjo," Dabney and Trent (words & melody)
16. "Six Little Wives" (of Chief Bobo), Dabney and Trent (words & melody)
17. "Someday," Dabney (melody), Trent (words); Josephine Hall, vocalist
18. "Sweet Evening Breeze," Dabney and Trent (words & melody)
19. "Voodoo," Dabney (melody), Trent (words)
20. "Zulu Fifth Avenue," Dabney and Trent (words & melody)

Not listed in Catalogue of Copyright Entries:

21. "Summer Nights," Josephine Hall, vocalist
22. "Tramps of the Desert"

== Post Broadway performances ==
After closing on Broadway, Rang Tang opened in

- Brooklyn: Werba's Theater
- Baltimore: Ford's Theatre – opened October 24, 1927, for a 1-week engagement
- Boston: Tremont Theatre – November 28, 1927
- New Haven, Connecticut: Shubert Theatre – opened December 29, 1927
- Jamaica, Queens, New York City: Cort Theater – January 1928; John Cort's theater, on 175th Street at Jamaica Avenue; opened August 22, 1927, with the American stage premier of Mr. What's His Name; the structure was designed by Eugene DeRosa
- Harlem: Lafayette Theatre – opened February 13, 1928

== Other productions ==
- Staged and produced by Edward E. Daley (1884–1933), starring Billy Higgins (1888–1937) and Joe Byrd (né Joseph Byrd; 1886–1946)
  - Chicago: Woods Theatre – opened June 20, 1928, close July 14, 1928
  - Detroit (Paradise Valley): Koppin Theater – opened July 28, 1928; note: the Koppin Theater, owned by Henry Koppin (né Henry Emil Koppin; 1900–1961), opened August 27, 1927, and closed in 1929, after the Wall Street Crash of 1929

== Legacy as employer of African Americans in Broadway theater ==
In an informal survey of integrated casts in the 1927 Broadway season, Pittsburgh Courier reporter Floyd J. Calvin (1902–1939) wrote:

Among the white shows that have taken in colored actors are Oscar Hammerstein's Golden Dawn (1927), about 30, with William C. Elkins (né William Calvin Elkins; 1872–1954) (Note: Who's Who in Colored America (1941 to 1944; Vol. 6) (re: "Elkins, William Cuthbert"), Brooklyn: Thomas Yenser, editor and publisher (1942), p. 597) in charge of the chorus; Florenz Ziegfeld's Show Boat, about 45, with Jules Bledsoe in the lead; David Belasco's Lulu Belle (1926), about 60 with Edna Thomas and others; In Abraham's Bosom (1926), about 18; Sidewalks of New York (1927), about 8; Porgy (1927), 52; Rang Tang, 80.

— Floyd J. Calvin, 1927 (Note: "Survey of Theatrical Field Reveals Actors Are Making Money, but Producers Aren't," by Floyd J. Calvin (né Floyd Joseph Calvin; 1902-1939), Pittsburgh Courier, Vol. 18, No. 48, November 26, 1927, sect. 2, p. 2 (accessible via Fultonhistory.com; article link))

== Gallery ==
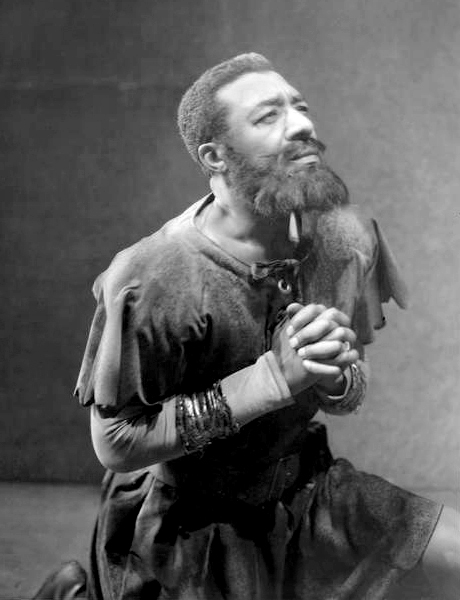
1938
Daniel L. Haynes in a 1938 stage presentation of Androcles and the Lion at the Lafayette Theatre, Harlem

1923
Evelyn Preer
(publicity photo)

== See also ==
- African-American musical theater

== Notes, copyrights, references ==
=== Copyrights ===
- Original copyrights
- Note: sheet music copyrighted in the U.S. (a) prior to 1925 with copyright renewal or (b) from 1925 through 1963 without copyright renewal is deemed public domain.
- Catalog of Copyright Entries, Part 1, Group 3: Class D: Dramatic Compositions, Motion Pictures, New Series, Library of Congress, Copyright Office
- Catalog of Copyright Entries, Part 3 Musical Compositions, New Series, Library of Congress, Copyright Office
- Catalog of Copyright Entries, Third Series, Renewal Registrations – Music
- Renewals

=== Further reading ===
1. The ASCAP Biographical Dictionary (3rd ed.), American Society of Composers, Authors and Publishers (1966)
2. Biographical Dictionary of American Music, by Charles Eugene Claghorn (1911–2005), West Nyack: Parker Publishing Company, Inc. (1973)
3. The Oxford Companion to Popular Music, by Peter Gammond (1925–2019), Oxford Companions, Oxford University Press (1991)
4. Biography Index, A cumulative index to biographical material in books and magazines, Vol. 14, September 1984 – August 1986, H.W. Wilson Co. (1986)
5. Profiles of African American Stage Performers and Theatre People, 1816–1960, by Bernard L. Peterson, Jr., Greenwood Press (2001)
6. Biographical Dictionary of Afro-American and African Musicians, by Eileen Jackson Southern (1920–2002), Greenwood Press (1982) (borrowable online via Internet Archive)
7. In Black and White, A guide to magazine articles, newspaper articles, and books concerning black individuals and groups (3rd ed.; Vol. 1 of 2), Mary Mace Spradling (née Mary Elizabeth Mace; 1911–2009) (ed.), Gale Research (1980); OCLC 631458944
8. In Black and White (3rd ed.; supplement), Mary Mace Spradling (née Mary Elizabeth Mace; 1911–2009) (ed.), Gale Research (1985); OCLC 849767637
