= Kaj Gynt =

Swedish-American actress

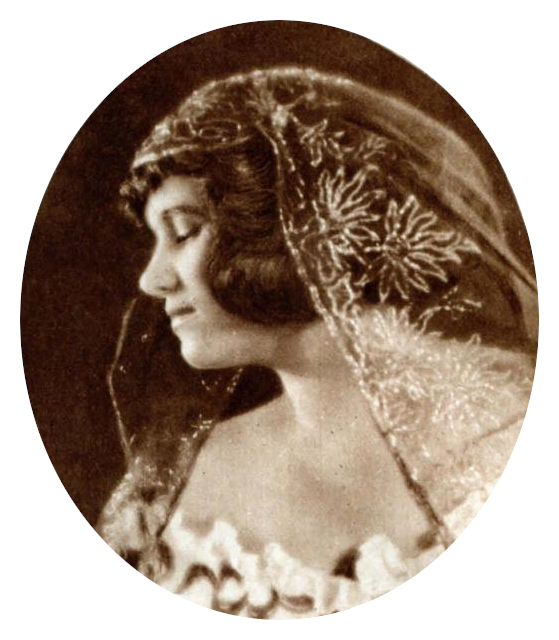
- Born: Karin Sophia Cederstrand; 24 October 1885; Stockholm
- Died: 6 June 1956 (aged 70) (DOD approx)
- Citizenship: Swedish
- Spouse: Harold Gustav Frederic Matthiessen (1883–1940)
- Children: Arthur Frans Fredrick Matthiessen (1908–2004)
- Writing career
- Notable work: Rang Tang

Karin Sophia Matthiessen; née Cederstrand; 24 October 1885 – 1956), known under the pseudonym Kaj Gynt or Kay Gynt, was a Swedish-turned-American actress and, for one notable 1927 Broadway musical, a book writer.

== Career ==
=== Acting ===
Before emigrating to New York, Gynt performed three years with the Royal Dramatic Theatre in Stockholm. In America, she played Kate in the 1917 film The Eternal Mother (Note: "Swedish Actress Makes American Bow," Motography, Vol. 19, No. 5, 2 February 1918, p. 226) and was a skating party guest in the 1917 film, The Last Sentence, directed by Ben Turbett. In 1921, Gynt played Clorinda in Henry Bataille's 3-act romantic comedy, Don Juan, at the Garrick Theatre, New York. (Note: "Mr. Hornblow Goes to the Play" (re: "Garrick, Don Juan,") by Arthur Hornblow Sr. (1865–1942) (see Arthur Hornblow Jr.), Theatre Magazine, Vol. 34, Whole No. 248, November 1921, p. 340 (article is on pps. 313–316, 340, 344))

=== Writing ===
She authored the book for the 1927 Broadway musical revue, Rang Tang. (Note: "Svensk Negerrevy På Broadway – ett litet Amerikabrev från en svensk skådespelerska" (Kaj Gynt, cover photo), by Rosa Tillman, Scenen, Tidskrift för teater, musik och film (official publication of the Swedish Theater Association), Issue N° 1, January 1928, cover & p. 15 (courtesy of Project Runeberg); OCLC 236088058, 1084249228 Note: The author, Rosa Tillman (1895–1975), was a Swedish actress.) She also co-authored, in 1936 with Langston Hughes, a proposed production, Cock o' the World, music by Duke Ellington, Wilbur Hughes Strickland, MD (1903–1987), and Billy Strayhorn. The work was never performed.

== Growing up, emigration, marriage, and family ==
Gynt grew-up in Stockholm and was friends with Greta Garbo. (Note: "An Unknown Chapter in Greta Garbo's Life," by Kaj Gynt (as told by Adela Rogers St. Johns), Liberty Magazine; OCLC 793521530 (Part 1 of 2), Vol. 11, No. 33, 18 August 1934, p. 5 (Part 2 of 2), Vol. 11, No. 34, 25 August 1934, p. 28 Republished: "The Shy, Sad Little Girl Who Became a Star," San Francisco Chronicle, 16 November 1982, p. 48 (accessible via GenealogyBank.com; subscription required)) (Note: "The Vikings Come Again" (photo of Kaj Gynt included), by Walter Bodin (né Walter Beliveau Bodin; 1889–1968), Pantomime, Vol. 2, No. 4, 28 January 1922, p. 8) At age 22, she and Harold Gustav Frederic Matthiessen (1883–1940) arrived at Ellis Island, New York City, 21 December 1907, aboard the SS Kaiserin Auguste Victoria from Cuxhaven. (Note: "New York Passenger Arrival Lists (Ellis Island), 1892–1924" (re: "Cederstrand, Karin S." & "Matthiessen, Harold," 21 December 1907), database with images, FamilySearch, GS Film No. 1399746 (GS = Genealogical Society of Utah), Digital Folder No. 007658589, Image No. 00789) That same day, they married each other at the Gustavus Adolphus Lutheran Church, (Note: Archives of the Evangelical Lutheran Church in America; Elk Grove Village, Illinois; Swedish American Baptisms, Marriages, Deaths, and Burials; Parish: Gustavus Adolphus Lutheran Church (re: "Harold Gustaf F. Matthiesson" and "Karin Sofia Cederstrand," 21 December 1907, New York, New York); ELCA Film No. S190(3); SSIRC Film No. S-190 (accessible via Ancestry.com; subscription required)) 155 East 22nd Street (between Lexington and Third Avenues). Their marriage was officiated by Rev. Dr. Johan Gustaf Mauritz Stolpe (1858–1938), son of composer Gustav Stolpe (1833–1901). In 1917, Harold and Karin both became United States naturalized citizens.

=== Family ===
Gynt's husband, Harold Mattiessen, was a graduate of KTH Royal Institute of Technology. Gynt's brother, Sölve Cederstrand (1900–1954), was a Swedish journalist, screenwriter, and film director. Another brother, Ragnar Cederstrand (1891–1935), was a Swedish film critic.
