= Garland Wilson =

American jazz pianist (1909–1954)

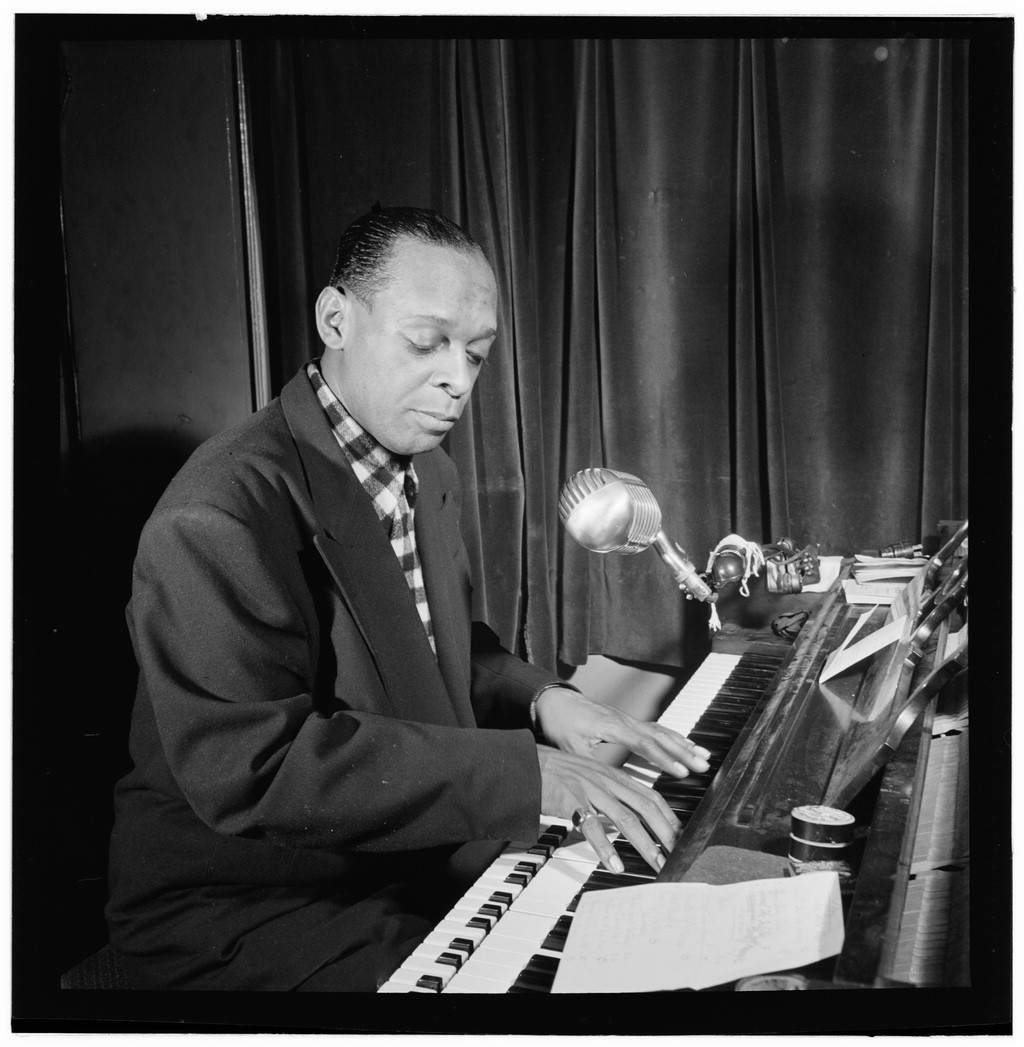
- Garland Wilson in the 1940s Photograph by William P. Gottlieb

Background information
- Born: Garland Lorenzo Wilson; June 13, 1909; Martinsburg, West Virginia, U.S.
- Died: May 31, 1954 (aged 44)
- Genres: Jazz; Blues; Boogie-woogie
- Occupation: Musician
- Instrument: Piano

Garland Lorenzo Wilson (June 13, 1909 – May 31, 1954) was an American jazz pianist who accompanied Nina Mae McKinney. Wilson was a boogie-woogie and stride pianist.

== Life and career ==
Garland Wilson was born in Martinsburg, West Virginia, United States.

Wilson attended Howard University in Washington, D.C., and, in the 1930s, worked in New York City at nightclubs in the area. In 1932, the pianist joined Nina Mae McKinney on a European tour. Wilson worked extensively in England as a member of local groups, and recorded with trumpeter Nat Gonella. In the liner notes of the CD box l'intégrale Django reinhardt - vol 2 he is quoted as being accompanist of French singer Jean Sablon, together with guitarist Django Reinhardt on two sides recorded on November 1, 1935, in Paris. In 1939, he returned to the United States, where he remained until 1951, when he moved to Paris, France. The artist remained there until he died in 1954.

== Select discography ==
=== Solo ===
- Memories of You (Okeh)
- Rockin' Chair (Okeh)

=== With Charlie Lewis and Herman Chittison ===
- Jazz In Paris: Harlem Piano in Montmartre (Sunny Side)

=== With Mae Barnes ===
- Fun With Mae Barnes (Atlantic)
