= Bella Dorita =

Spanish cabaret singer, dancer and vedette

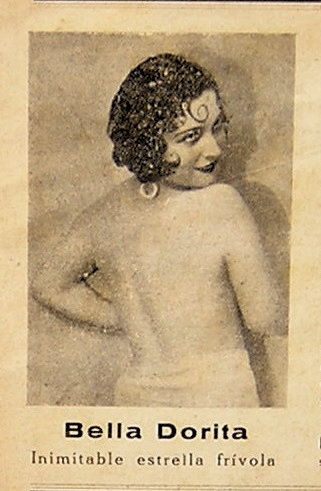
Bella Dorita

María Yáñez García (stage name, Bella Dorita; Cuevas de Almanzora, Province of Almería, February 23, 1901 – Barcelona, June 27, 2001), was a Spanish cabaret singer, dancer, and vedette.

== Biography ==
In 1913, she emigrated to Barcelona with her family (mother, grandfather, uncle and six siblings) due to the economic hardship caused by the closure of the lead and silver mines in her locale. In Barcelona, she worked in a toy factory and embroidery shop. At the age of sixteen, she eloped with her first husband. After a working as a hostess, she appeared in 1917 at a beauty pageant which started her on a career in show business, debuting in 1923. As one of the four most notable cupletistas of her era, she appeared in halls and theaters, such as Pompeya, Rigat, Novelty, Bataclán, Cómico, Español, Arnau, Victoria, Nuevo, and Apolo where she began to establish his career. In those years, she took singing lessons and voice as well as learning how to perform on the Catalan stage.

At the El Molino, she took on her stage name of Bella Dorita and become a star. It would make famous songs such as La pulga, El tren, La vaselina, Poco a poco and Fumando espero. During the 1940s and 1950s, Bella Dorita enjoyed the greatest success, being considered the most important star of the Avinguda del Paral·lel and compared often with Mae West for her brilliant dialogue, direct but not vulgar. In addition to regularly performing in Spanish venues in Madrid, Valencia, Bilbao, and Zaragoza, she also traveled to Paris and visited Montmartre, but always preferred performing at Paral·lel.

She retired during the 1960s at the Teatro Victoria with the show Historias del Paralelo. She spent the last years of her life in the Nursing Home Pilar de Barcelona. In 1991, coinciding with her 90th birthday, she received the Medal for Artistic Merit of the City of Barcelona, and on the occasion of her 100th birthday in 2001, she received a tribute in the Barcelona neighborhood of Gava. She died four months later.
