= Media in Bucharest =

This list of radio stations in Bucharest, Romania. There are 25 FM stations in Bucharest.

== Radio Stations ==
Frequency	Name	Format	Owner	City	Website
88.0 MHz	Radio Impuls 88.0	Pop and dance music	Dogan Media International	Cluj-Napoca	Web Stream
88.5 MHz	Radio Trinitas 88.5	Religious	Radioul Patriarhiei Romane	Bucharest	Web Stream
89.0 MHz	Radio Zu 89.0	Contemporary Hit Radio	Antena TV Group	Bucharest	Web Stream
89.5 MHz	Dance FM 89.5	Electronic and Pop Dance music	Digi Communications	Bucharest	Web Stream
90.8 MHz	Magic FM 90.8	Easy listening, Oldies	ANT1 Group	Bucharest	Web Stream
91.7 MHz	National FM 91.7	Romanian Music	Ioan și Viorel Micula	Bucharest	Web Stream
92.1 MHz	Vibe FM 92.1	Romanian pop music	Lagardère Group affiliated with Tomorrowland	Bucharest	Web Stream
92.7 MHz	Urban FM 92.7	Hip-Hop,Rap,Trap	SICVRIO S.R.L.	Bucharest	Web Stream
93.5 MHz	RFI România 93.5	News, Talk, Sports	Radio France Internationale	Bucharest	Web Stream
94.2 MHz	Radio Vocea Evangheliei 94.2	Religious	Radio Vocea Evangheliei - Suceava	Bucharest	Web Stream
94.8 MHz	Radio Guerrilla 94.8	Rock, Alternative	Realitatea-Caţavencu	Bucharest	Web Stream
96.1 MHz	Kiss FM 96.1	Dance Music, Electronic music, Pop music	ANT1 Group	Bucharest	Web Stream
96.9 MHz	Gold FM 96.9	Talk, News, Oldies	Realitatea-Caţavencu	Bucharest	Web Stream
97.9 MHz	Digi FM 97.9	Soft AC (Pop Music, News)	Digi Communications	Bucharest	Web Stream
100.2 MHz	Virgin Radio 100.2	Hip-Hop, R'n'B, Trap, Pop, Dance	Lagardère Group	Bucharest	Web Stream
100.6 MHz	Rock FM 100.6	Classic Rock	ANT1 Group	Bucharest	Web Stream
101.3 MHz	Radio România Cultural 101.3	Culture radio	Romanian Radio Broadcasting Company	Bucharest	Web Stream
101.9 MHz	Romantic FM 101.9	Love and Oldies	Intact Media Group	Bucharest	Web Stream
102.8 MHz	Pro FM 102.8	Pop, Top40	Digi Communications	Bucharest	Web Stream
103.4 MHz	Radio Seven	Pop, Rock	Mass Media România de Mâine	Bucharest	Web Stream
103.8 MHz	Digi 24 FM 103.8	News	Digi Communications	Bucharest	Web Stream
104.8 MHz	Radio România Muzical 104.8	Classical music	Romanian Radio Broadcasting Company	Bucharest	Web Stream
105.3 MHz	Radio România Actualităţi 105.3	News, General and Pop music	Romanian Radio Broadcasting Company	Bucharest	Web Stream
105.8 MHz	Sport Total FM 105.8	Sport, Talk and Rock Music	Primăria Voluntari	Bucharest	Web Stream
106.2 MHz	3 FM 106.2	News and Talk	Intact Media Group	Bucharest	Web Stream
106.7 MHz	Europa FM 106.7	Soft AC ( Pop Music and News)	Lagardère Group	Bucharest	Web Stream
107.3 MHz	Euronews Radio	Soft AC (Pop Music, News)	Euronews România	Bucharest	Web Stream

== Internet radio ==
- Social FM
- METRONOM FM Romania
- Radio RO GOLD
- FUN Radio Bucharest
- Vox-T Radio
- Transylvanian Unitarian Radio
- Fake.fm Radio
- Dance.RO
- MegaHit
- Radio Downed
