= Preciosilla =

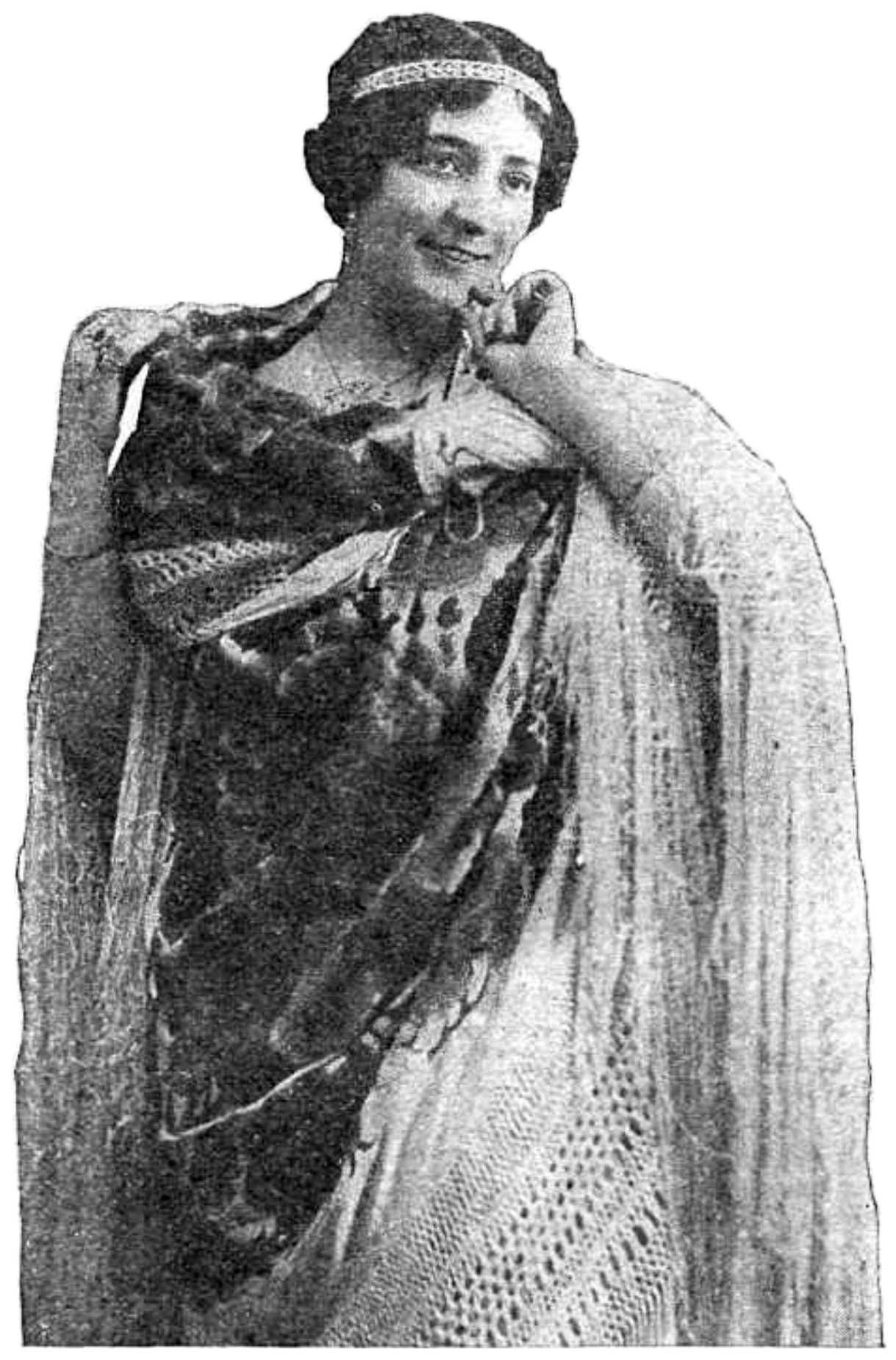
Preciosilla

Manuela Tejedor Clemente (stage name, Preciosilla; 7 June 1893 in Calatayud – 12 November 1952 in Madrid) was a Spanish cupletista.
