= Rafael Calleja Gómez =

Spanish composer

Rafael Calleja Gómez (21 October 1870 – 11 February 1938) was a Spanish composer, best known for the song "Adiós Granada".

Calleja Gómez composed more than 200 works.
