= Cuplé =

Spanish musical style

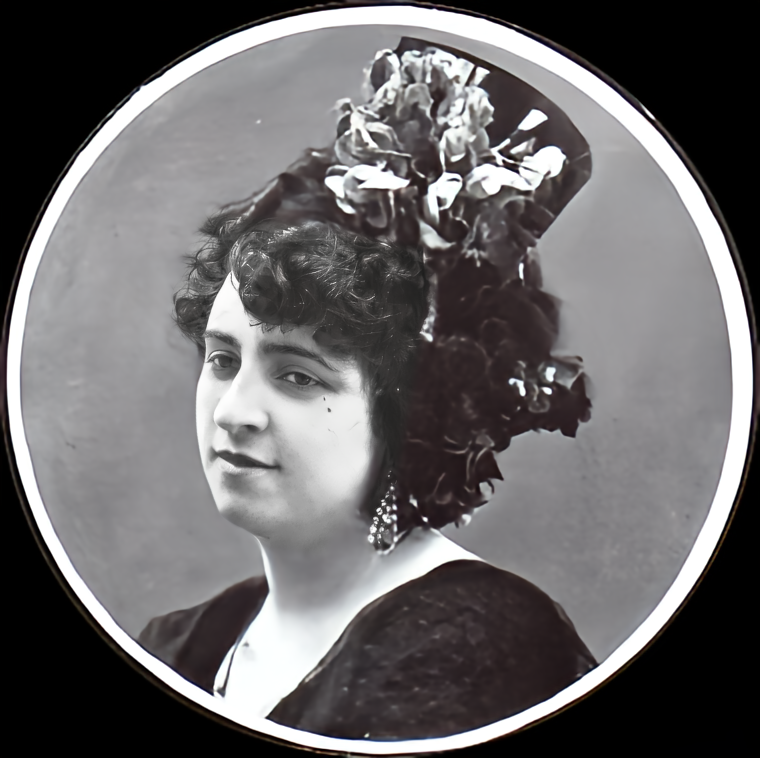
Aurora Purificación Mañanós Jauffret (1891–1950), «La Goya», in 1914

The cuplé was a popular risqué Spanish theatre song style in the late years of the 19th century. From 1893 to 1911 the songs were a feature of the "género ínfimo" (lowest type) cabaret theatre sung by solo female singers, or men in drag, and attended mainly by men. But in the second decade of the 20th century the cuplé, in a more respectable form, became more family-friendly and was associated with the makings of stars of the Spanish theatre such as Aurora Jauffret, "La Goya", and Lola Montes, who sang the cuplé El novio de la muerte, which, after adaptation, became the official hymn of the Spanish Legion.

The term comes from French couplet, but the poetic form couplet in Spanish is a pareado or dístico. The cuplé prefigured the copla of the 1930s.

== Notable cupletistas ==
- María Antinea (1915–1991), Spanish actress, vedette, dancer, cupletista and tonadillera
- La Argentinita (1898–1945), Spanish-Argentine flamenco dancer (bailaora), choreographer and singer
- Bella Dorita (1901–2001), Spanish cabaret singer, dancer, and vedette
- Paquita Escribano (1880–1970), Spanish singer (cupletista and tonadillera)
- Julia Fons (1882–1973), Spanish singer and cupletista
- La Fornarina (1884–1915), Cuplé singer
- Celia Gámez (1905–1992), Argentine film actress, icon of the Golden Age of Spanish theatre
- Úrsula López (1870–1966), Spanish Zarzuela, variety singer, and businesswoman
- Raquel Meller (1888-1962), Spanish diseuse, cuplé, and tonadilla singer and actress.
- Lola Montes (1898–1983), Spanish singer
- La Chelito (1885–1959), Cuban-born Spanish cuplé singer, and theater business owner
- Preciosilla (1893–1952), Spanish cupletista
- Olga Ramos (1918–2005), Spanish cupletista, violinist, and actress
- Rosita Rodrigo (1891–1959), Spanish actress, vedette, dancer and songwriter
- Teresita Zazá (1893–1980), Spanish tonadillera, cupletista, and actress
