= Daniel L. Haynes =

American actor (1889–1954)

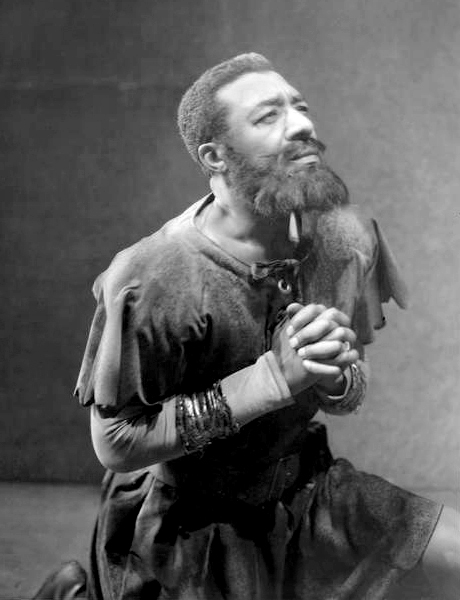
- Haynes in a stage presentation of Androcles and the Lion, Lafayette Theatre, NYC, 1938
- Born: Daniel Leo (aka Louis) Haynes; June 6, 1889; Atlanta, Georgia, U.S.
- Died: July 28, 1954 (aged 65); Kingston, New York, U.S.
- Resting place: Wiltwyck Cemetery, Kingston
- Occupations: actor; minister of the gospel
- Spouse: Rosa Belle Sims

Daniel L. Haynes (June 6, 1889 – July 28, 1954) was an American stage and film actor and clergyman. He is best known for starring as Zeke in King Vidor's early talking film Hallelujah, the first film ever to feature an all-Black cast. On November 28, 1910, he married Rosa Belle Sims in Chicago. In his last years, he left show business and became a full-time Baptist minister.

Despite Hallelujah's controversial depiction of Black Americans, Haynes thought highly of the film. He is quoted as having said: "I cannot say what our race owes King Vidor and Metro-Goldwyn-Mayer—there are not words forceful enough for that. Hallelujah will, as Moses led his people from the wilderness, lead ours from the wilderness of misunderstanding and apathy."

== Selected filmography ==
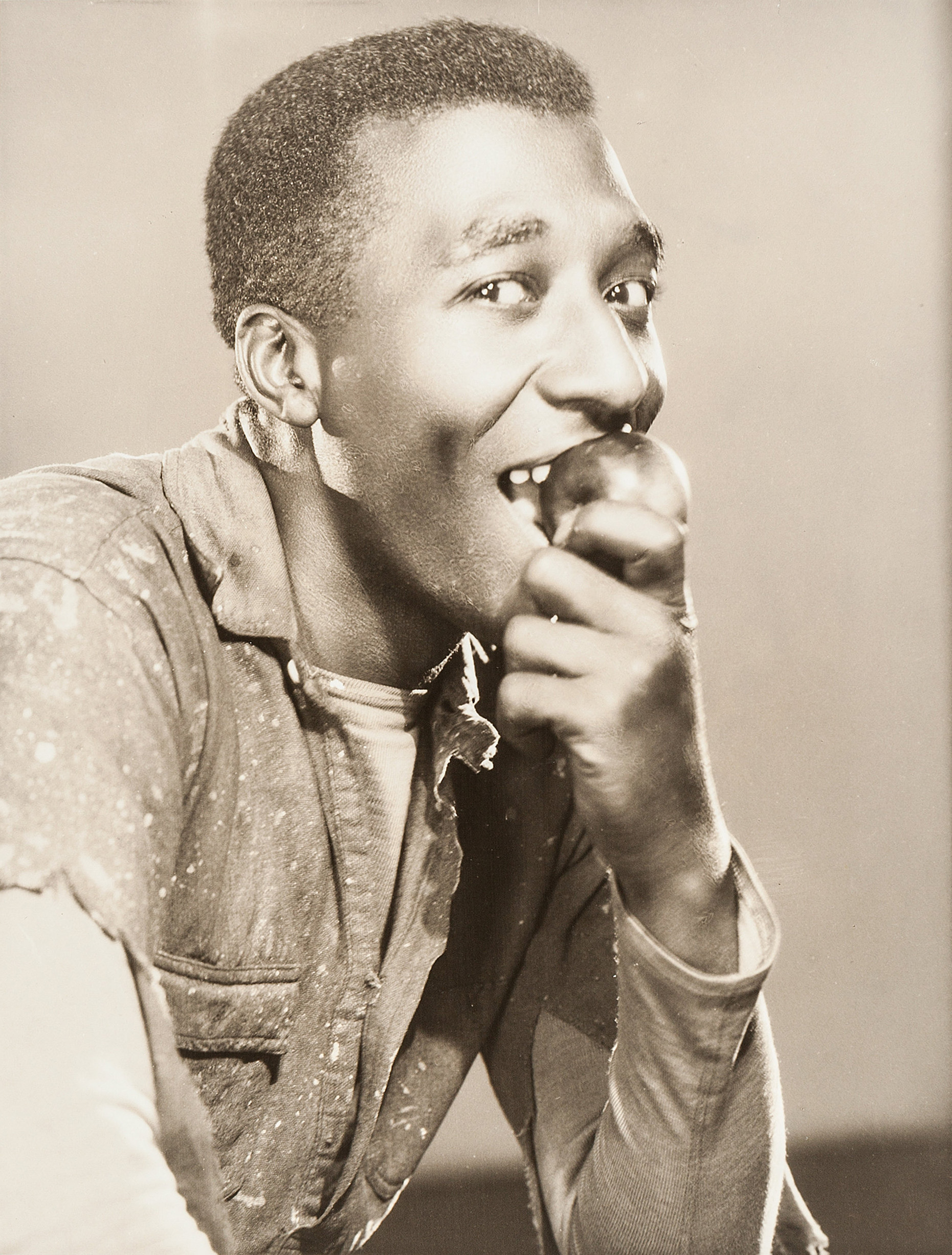
Publicity photo of Daniel L. Haynes by Ruth Harriet Louise

- John Smith (1922)
- Hallelujah (1929)
- The Last Mile (1932)
- Mary Burns, Fugitive (1935)
- So Red the Rose (1935)
- Escape from Devil's Island (1935)
- The Invisible Ray (1936)
- Fury (1936)

== Theater ==
- Rang Tang (1927)
