= Maria Rodrigo =

Spanish pianist and composer

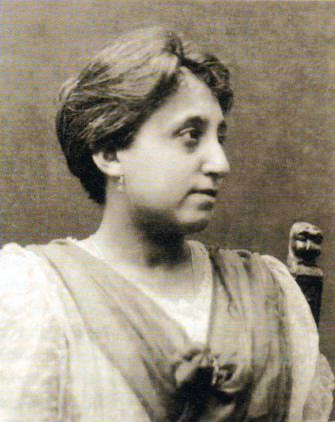
María Rodrigo Bellido

María Rodrigo (20 March 1888 – 8 December 1967) was a Spanish pianist and composer. She was the daughter of Pantaléon Rodrigo, and studied music at the Madrid Conservatorium under José Tragó for piano, Valentín Arín for harmony and Emilio Serrano for composition. Maria was the first woman to have her opera performed in Spain. Her sister Mercedes Rodrigo was equally intelligent, being the first woman from Spain to obtain a degree in psychology from the Rousseau Institute in Geneva. The two left Spain for Switzerland during the Spanish Civil War, moved in 1939 to Bogotá, Colombia, at the invitation of rector Agustín Nieto Caballero, and in 1950 to Puerto Rico at the invitation of José María García Madrid. With Pablo Casals, Rodrigo founded the Puerto Rico Conservatory of Music. She died in Puerto Rico in 1967. Maria was one of the few composers that addressed the composition of zarzuelas, a genre of Spanish music.

== Early life ==
=== Background and early life ===
The environment that Maria Rodrigo had growing up was very cultured, and her childhood consisted of being surrounded by high intellects. She acquired her first musical abilities from her father and then piano with Jose Trago and composition with Emilio Serrano. As a child prodigy, at the age of 14 she had already received scholarships to further her studies in France, Germany and Belgium. She ended up going to the city of Munich with the scholarship granted by the Board of Extension of Studies. Maria later served occasionally as a professor at the Royal Conservatory, until 1936, when the Spanish Civil War began. In 1933 she was appointed to the chair of vocal and instrumental ensembles at the Madrid Conservatory.

== Career and later life ==
Unable to accept Francoist Spain, Maria and her sister fled the country in the spring of 1939 before the fall of Madrid, taking her scores with her in a trunk. Unfortunately, the trunk containing all her music was lost en route to Geneva. The rest of her life was spent as a music teacher: first in Colombia until a local conflict there, then in Puerto Rico where she spent the last 17 years of her life alongside other Spanish exiles such as Pablo Casals and Francisco Ayala.

== Music ==
As a composer, Maria Rodrigo cultivated every genre, from vocal music (operas, zarzuelas and songs) to instrumental (symphonic, chamber, piano), and was the first woman to premiere an opera in Spain. She wrote several quintets for piano and wind instruments, as well as symphonic music such as the Rimas infantiles suite which was frequently performed in various concert programs in Madrid. German musical education is manifested throughout her works, as well as Wagnerian influence.

== Works ==
- Sonata en mi bemol para piano / Piano Sonata in Eb (1911)
- Obertura para orquesta / Overture for Orchestra (1912)
- Cuarteto de cuerda, en cuatro tiempos / String Quartet in Four Movements (1913)
- Cuarteto para instrumentos de arco / Quartet for Bowed String Instruments (1913)
- Mudarra para gran orquesta (poema sinfónico) / Mudarra for Orchestra (Symphonic poem) (1914)
- Sinfonía en 4 tiempos / Symphony in 4 movements (1914)
- Tres lieder para voz y piano (canciones con texto en alemán) / Three Lieder for voice and piano (1914)
- Salmantina (ópera) / Salmantina (Opera) (1914)
- Quinteto en fa para piano e instrumentos de viento / Quintet in F for Piano and winds (1915)
- Becqueriana (zarzuela, estrenada en el Teatro de la Zarzuela) (1915)
- Diana cazadora o Pena de muerte al amor (zarzuela, estrenada en el Teatro Apolo el 19 de noviembre) / Diana the Hunter, or Death Penalty for Love (Zarzuela, premiered at Teatro Apolo on November 19th) (1915)
- Alma española (poema sinfónico) / Alma Española/Spanish Soul (Symphonic Poem) (1917)
- Las hazañas de un pícaro (sainete, estrenado en el Teatro Apolo) / Las Hazañas de un Picaro/The Amazing Deeds of a Rascal, sainete, premiered at Teatro Apolo (1920)
- Linterna mágica / Magic Lantern (1921)
- El pavo real (comedia poética, estrenada en el Teatro Eslava) / The Indian Peafowl (poetic comedy, premiered at Teatro Eslava) (1922)
- Coplas de España (para guitarra), cuatro coplas dedicadas a Andrés Segovia / Coplas of Spain (for guitar), 4 coplas dedicated to Andrés Segovia (1924)
- Ayes (canciones para canto y piano) / Ayes (Songs for voice and piano) (1925)
- Canción de amor (ópera de cámara) / Love Song (Chamber opera) (1925)
- Rimas infantiles, glosas de canciones de corro / Nursery Rhymes, variations on circle songs (1930)
- La Copla intrusa (para piano) / The Intruder Copla for piano (1930)
- La Cenicienta (ballet infantil) / Cinderella (Children's ballet) (1941)
- Canciones infantiles / Children's Songs (1942)
- Fábulas / Fables (1942)
- La carta, el guante y la rosa (ballet) / The letter, the glove and the rose (ballet) (1945)
- La flor de la vida (ópera) / The flower of life (Opera)
- La romería del Rocío (zarzuela) / The Pilgrimage to El Rocío (Zarzuela)
- Los Caprichos de Goya (suite sinfónica para coro y orquesta) / Goya's Caprichos (Symphonic Suite for Choir and Orchestra)
