= Manuel Ochoa =

Cuban musician and conductor

- Born: October 6, 1925; Holguín, Cuba
- Died: July 15, 2006 (aged 81)
- Education: Conservatorio Internacional de Música, Havana; Real Conservatorio de Madrid, Spain
- Occupations: Music conductor, professor
- Spouse: Sofia Ochoa
- Children: Manuel Ochoa
- Parent(s): Manuel Trinidad Ochoa; Caridad Ochoa

Manuel Ochoa (October 6, 1925 – July 15, 2006) was a Cuban exile musician, choral and orchestra conductor who founded the Miami Symphony Orchestra.

== Biography ==
Manuel Ochoa was born on October 6, 1925, in Holguín, Cuba, to Manuel Trinidad Ochoa and Caridad Ochoa. He showed a strong ability for music from an early age, beginning his music studies with his mother, Caridad, a classically trained opera singer. Manuel Ochoa made his musical debut in his hometown at the age of seventeen, conducting Verdi's Il Trovatore. In 1942 he created the Sociedad Coral de Holguín, conducting the chorale ensemble until 1946. As music director of the Sociedad Coral, Ochoa presented international renowned artists such as the Vienna Boys Choir, with whom he began a close and longstanding collaboration. This relationship served as inspiration to create the Niños Cantores de la Habana for Cardinal Archbishop Monsignor Manuel Arteaga.

Ochoa went on to graduate from the Conservatorio Internacional de Música in Havana, and began his professional career as a choral conductor in Havana. He was the conductor of several choirs in Havana, such as the Coro de Madrigalistas. With the Coro de Madrigalistas, he presented a capella polyphonic works along with symphonic-choral works. Ochoa continued his education in Europe, where he graduated from the Real Conservatorio de Madrid in Spain after receiving a scholarship from the Instituto de Cultura Hispanica. He then studied conducting technique at the Accademia di Santa Cecilia in Rome under Maestro Bonaventura Somma; and in Vienna under Hermann Scherchen of the German School of Conducting.

Upon returning to Cuba after his studies, Ochoa was named Professor of Conducting Techniques at the Conservatorio Nacional and conducted the Orquesta Filarmonica de La Habana and the Orquesta Sinfónica Nacional. Later in Europe, he conducted the Orquesta y Coro de la Radio Nacional de España, the Orquesta de Camara de Madrid, and the Piccola Opera di Roma.

After studying and working in Cuba, Spain, Vienna, and Rome, Ochoa settled in Miami following the Cuban Revolution. He was among the first of Miami's Cuban exile artists to see the creative opportunities that the city could offer as the gateway of the Americas. In 1969 Ochoa conceived the Centro de Artes de America, a performing arts center to promote cultural collaboration across the Americas. Between 1969 and 1980 he founded and became general director and orchestra conductor for the Sociedad Artístico Cultural de las Americas and the Compañia Hispano-Americana de Arte in Miami. Both organizations made major contributions to the cultural development of the South Florida area and received public recognition from the City of Miami and Dade County for outstanding cultural achievement.

In 1989 Maestro Ochoa founded the Miami Symphony Orchestra as a cultural expression of Miami's multiethnic community. Ochoa served as the artistic director and conductor of the Miami Symphony Orchestra from its founding in 1989 until 2006, leading the orchestra in award-winning programming and performances, including guest performances at prestigious venues such as New York City's famed Carnegie Hall.

Manuel Ochoa was married to Sofia Ochoa and they had one son, Manuel. Ochoa died July 15, 2006.
