= Henri O'Kelly =

Franco-Irish composer, pianist, organist and choir director (1859–1938)

Joseph Pierre Henri O'Kelly (23 June 1859 – 15 March 1938) was a Franco-Irish composer, pianist, organist and choir director, based in Paris. A minor composer in the Impressionist school, as a conductor he made outstanding contributions to French church music.

== Biography ==
Henri O'Kelly was the second child (first son) of Joseph O'Kelly's (1828–1885) first marriage (1856). He was born in Paris and grew up in Rue du Faubourg Poissonnière in the 9th arrondissement. After initial piano studies with his father, he enrolled at the Conservatoire de Paris (1874–79) studying solfège with Albert Lavignac (1874–76) and piano with Georges Mathias (1876–79). O'Kelly was an exceptional student, winning awards every year, always sharing them with his fellow students Claude Debussy and Gabriel Pierné. While Debussy never won a "premier prix" in piano, O'Kelly did in his final year, 1879. The somewhat unexpected birth of a son in 1881 forced him to abandon a promising pianistic career and seek financial safety as a church organist and choir master, holding such positions at Saint-Germain-l'Auxerrois in central Paris (1881–1900) and Saint-Vincent-de-Paul in the 10th arrondissement (1900–1918). O'Kelly also taught music at the École Rocroy (10th arrondissement) from at least 1906 into the 1930s, having previously obtained the titles of "Officier d'Académie" (Silver Palm) in 1899 and "Officier de l'Instruction Publique" (Golden Palm) in 1901. Finally, from at least 1888 through the mid-1920s, O'Kelly was involved with the well-known piano manufacturer Pleyel where from c.1907, he was one of the pianists recording pianola rolls (see below).

O'Kelly married the pianist Clotilde Vacher-Gras in 1881; their son Henri O'Kelly jr. (1881–1922) became a notable double bass player in the orchestras of the Opéra Comique and the Société des Concerts du Conservatoire, and the editor of a volume of studies for bass clef instruments (Polyorgane, Paris: M. Sénart, 1920). For his services to French church music, Henri sr. became a Chevalier of the Légion d'Honneur in 1931, having been proposed by the Ministry of Foreign Affairs, as he had always remained Irish. Later he also became a Knight of the Papal Order of St. Gregory the Great. Henri O'Kelly died, aged 78, in unclear circumstances, on 15 March 1938 at the Villa Montmorency (demolished in 1974) in Cannes. He was buried on the Cimetière de Passy in Paris.

== Music ==
Henri O'Kelly did not study composition, therefore he never made a name for himself in this respect. His few extant publications date from the 1890s and early 1900s and mainly include music for piano and harp. Technically, they are much easier than his pianistic talents would suggest. Their harmonic language reveal an attractive Impressionist approach. "Played with sensitivity, they would still be a worthwhile repertory for a pianist interested in typical turn-of-the-century French music." This is particularly true for Mélancolie (1897) for cello and piano and some of the piano music published after 1900 (see 'Selected works'). Apparently, he also wrote a number of motets and other church music, but of these only a setting of Tu es Petrus (c.1903) has survived in manuscript.

== Church music director ==
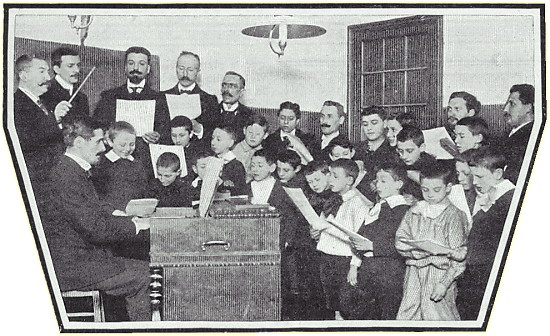
Henri O'Kelly (far left) conducting a rehearsal of the choir of St-Vincent-de-Paul (1903). Source: Musica, January 1904.

In his 38 years as organist and choir master at prominent Paris churches, O'Kelly made a name for himself as a promoter of large-scale church music by contemporary French composers. He particularly championed music by Adolphe Deslandres (1840–1911), Théodore Dubois (1837–1924), César Franck (1845–1924), and Camille Saint-Saëns (1835–1921), besides several younger composers. It is for this work that he was honoured by the Légion d'Honneur in 1931.

== Pianola rolls ==
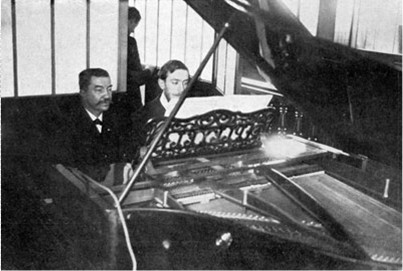
Henri O'Kelly (left) and Alexandre Angot recording a Pleyela roll. Source: Le Monde musical, 1907.

From about 1907 until the mid-1920s, O'Kelly recorded numerous pianola rolls for the "Pleyela" brand of player pianos by Pleyel, Wolff, Lyon & Cie. Some 50 such rolls were documented in Sitsky (1991) and Klein (2014), but this list has in the meantime grown to over 120. He has recorded European classical composers such as Beethoven and Mendelssohn as well as French composers such as Charles Gounod and Gabriel Fauré, also including some of his contemporaries such as Ernest Gillet and Gabriel Pierné. He also recorded three works by his father Joseph O'Kelly and one by himself, the Impressions de voyages (1903).

== Selected works ==
Piano

- Douchinka. Valse lente (1887), Paris: Richault.
- Rêverie pastorale (1900), Paris: A. Noël (also for harp).
- Valse berçante (1900), Paris: A. Noël.
- Valse rêveuse (1901), Paris: A. Noël.
- Impressions de voyages (1903), Brussels: Schott frères. Contains: Causerie, Sous bois, Eau courante.

Harp

- Rêverie pastorale (1900), Paris: A. Noël (also for piano).
- Prélude pour harpe chromatique (1900), Paris: A. Leduc.

Chamber

- Mélancolie (1897) for violin or cello and piano. Published in Le Monde moderne, 5 June 1897.
- Méditation (before 1904) for oboe, horn, harp, organ (unpublished)

Songs

- Deux Chants patriotiques (1890), Paris: Mackar & Noël. Contains: Rendez-nous, l'Alsace et la Lorraine and À Jeanne la Lorraine.

Vocal church music

- Tu es Petrus (c.1903) for boy soprano, 2 tenors, 2 basses, male choir, organ
- Ave Maria (before 1904)
- Pie Jesu (before 1904)
- and more motets etc.

== Bibliography ==
- Axel Klein: O'Kelly. An Irish Musical Family in Nineteenth-Century France (Norderstedt: BoD, 2014), ISBN 978-3-7357-2310-9.
