= Galvany =

Galvany is a surname. Notable people with the surname include:

- Maria Galvany (1878–1944), Spanish coloratura soprano
- Marisa Galvany (born 1936), American soprano
