= Adolphe Deslandres =

French composer and organist (1840–1911)

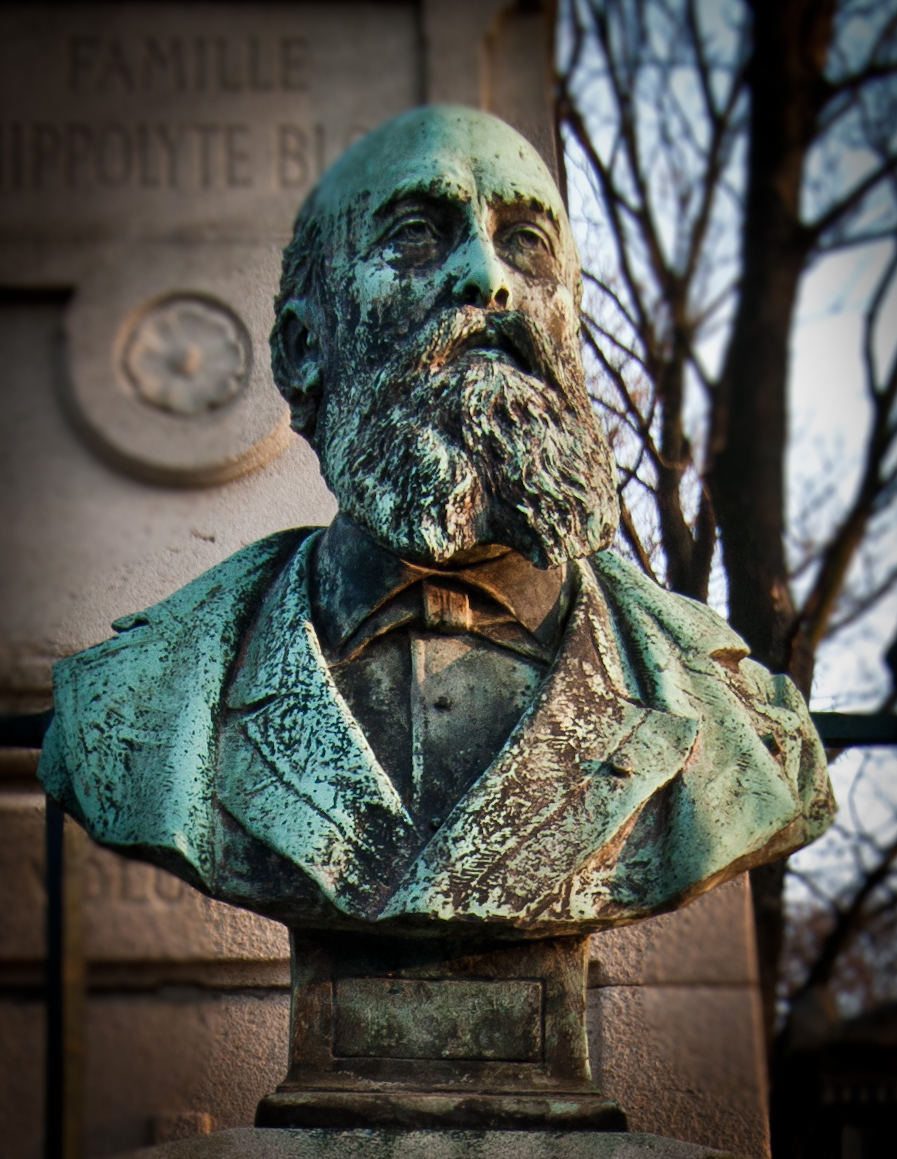
Buste of Adolphe Deslandres - Montmartre Cemetery

Adolphe Édouard Marie Deslandres (22 January 1840 – 30 July 1911) was a French composer and organist.

== Life ==
Born in the former village of Batignolles-Monceau, Adolphe Deslandres was the son of Laurent Deslandres, who was for a long time the Maître de chapelle and organist of Église Sainte-Marie des Batignolles. At the Conservatoire de Paris, he studied counterpoint and fugue with Aimé Leborne and pipe organ with François Benoist. In 1860, he won the Second Grand Prix de Rome with his cantata Ivan IV.

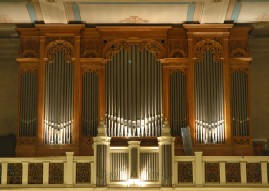
The Grand Orgue de l'église Sainte-Marie des Batignolles. Instrument Cavaillé-Coll dated 1923. Adolphe Deslandres and his father Laurent were titular organists of this church in the 19th century.

In 1862, he succeeded his father as organist of the Sainte-Marie church. He played on an organ of the Stoltz Frères company, and on a choir organ of the Merklin firm. In addition to his extensive works of sacred music such as the Messe de Saint-André, premiered at Notre Dame de Paris, and his Messe solennelle, Deslandres composed several successful opéras comiques. In 1872, his opera Dimanche et Lundi was premiered at the Opéra-Comique and received the praise of Gounod. The premiere of Le Baiser took place in 1884. His other operas were performed at the Alcazar.

Deslandres also composed some works for organ, piano (an Air de ballet and Études in staccato), a Scherzo for orchestra, and four Méditations for violin, cello, French horn, harp, organ and double bass.

Adolphe Deslandres had two brothers, also musicians, whose careers were interrupted by their premature death. Jules-Laurent Deslandres (15 August 1838 in Batignolles – 1 August 1870) studied at the Conservatoire de Paris where in 1855 he won the first prize for professional double bass. He had been a member of the orchestra of the Opéra de Paris. Georges-Philippe Deslandres (5 May 1849 – 12 October 1875) was a student in the organ class of César Franck at the Conservatoire de Paris. In 1870, he won the second prize for organ. He was organist of the churches of Sainte-Clotilde, Saint-Vincent-de-Paul and Sainte-Marie. Adolphe Deslandres also had a sister, Clémence Deslandres, who was a singer and performed many times the works of her brother.

Adolphe Deslandres died in Paris at age 71 and was buried at Montmartre Cemetery.

== Works ==
- Bajazet et le Joueur de flûte, cantata, 1858
- Ivan IV, cantata, 1860
- Dimanche et Lundi, opera comique, 1872
- Le Chevalier Bijou, opera, 1875
- Fridolin, opera, 1876
- Scherzo for orchestra, 1880
- Les Sept Paroles du Christ, oratorio for baritone, choir, solo violin, cello, harp and organ (after Édouard Laboulaye), 1883
- Le Baiser, opera comique, 1884.
- Stabat Mater for four voices, choir, organ and orchestra, 1885
- Trois pièces en quintette, for wind quintet, 1900
- Sauvons nos frères, cantata for solo voices, choir and orchestra
- Invocation à Marie
- Offertoire et Communion for organ
- Offertoire pour grand orgue
- Air de ballet for piano
- Études de concert en staccato for piano
- Méditations for violin, cello, horn, harp, organ and double bass
- Ode à l'harmonie
- Introduction et Polonaise pour hautbois et piano.
- Panis Angelicus, tenor solo with horn and organ accompaniment.
