= Marie Azpiroz Mellini =

Spanish violinist (born 1889)

Marie Azpiroz
- Born: November 27, 1889
- Education: Madrid Royal Conservatory
- Occupation: violinist

Marie Azpiroz was a Spanish violinist.

Azpiroz was born in Madrid, Spain, on November 27, 1889. She commenced study of the violin at age 5 at the Madrid Royal Conservatory, where she graduated with high honors after 6 years. She was recognized as performing before the young King and Queen Dowager of Spain as well as President Diaz of Mexico. She toured in Cuba, Mexico, South America, and the United States with numerous newspaper reviews between 1903 and 1910.

On March 12, 1904 she performed benefit at Carnegie Music Hall in New York, United States.

Around 1909 she settled in Los Angeles, California, United States and taught at The Fillmore School of Music.

In 1914 Azpiroz married Frederick Mellini and they had two children. Frederick and Marie performed together with the Metropolitan Grand Opera Company.

Between 1909 and 1919, many photographs were taken of Azpiroz by Charles F Lummis and those are currently housed in the Braun Research Library Collection, Autry Museum of the American West.

Azpiroz was a virtuoso of the classical repertoire, including pieces by Beethoven, Mendelssohn, Vieuxtemps, Wieniawski, Sarasate, and Monasterio.
