= Madrid Royal Conservatory =

Music school in Madrid, Spain

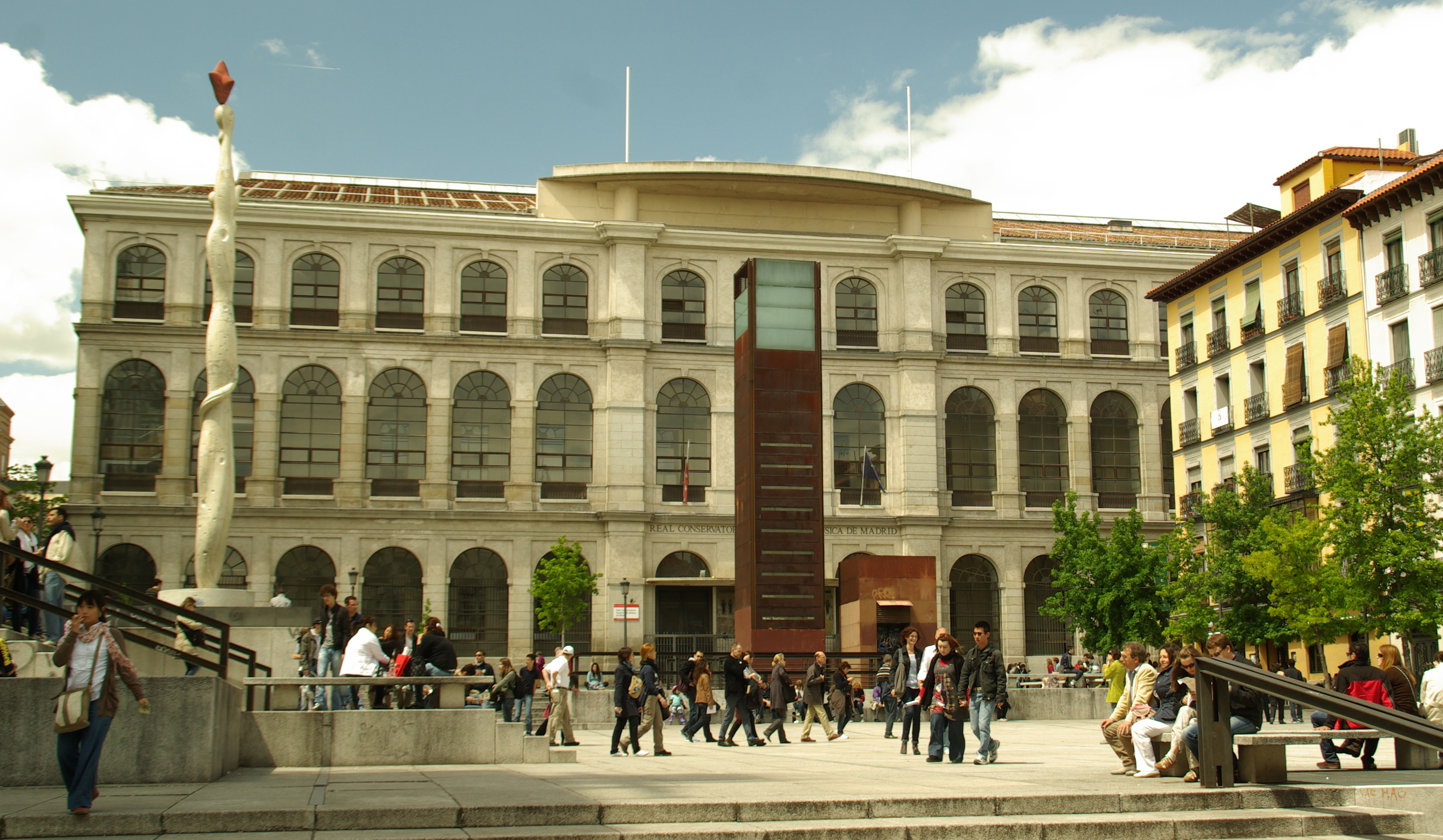
- Conservatory's building
- Type: Public
- Established: 1830; 196 years ago
- Principal: Ana Guijarro Malagón
- Location: C/ Doctor Mata 2, 28012., Madrid, Comunidad de Madrid, Spain; 40.409197°N 3.694345°W
- Campus: Urban
- Website: www.rcsmm.eu

The Madrid Royal Conservatory (Spanish: Real Conservatorio Superior de Música de Madrid) is a music college in Madrid, Spain.

== History ==
The Royal Conservatory of Music was founded on 15 July 1830 by royal decree, and was originally located in Mostenses Square, Madrid. In 1852 it was moved to the Royal Opera, where it remained until the building was condemned by royal order and classes ordered to halt in 1925. For the next sixty-five years, the school had no fixed home, operating in a variety of locations. Since 1990, the Conservatory has officially lived in a restored 18th-century building (previously San Carlos Royal Hospital) in front of Queen Sofia Museum.

== Alumni ==
Alumni of the school include:

- Joaquín Achúcarro
- Peter Navarro-Alonso
- Isaac Albéniz
- Pedro Albéniz
- José María Alvira
- Amalia Anglès y Mayer
- Ataúlfo Argenta
- Emilio Arrieta
- Marie Azpiroz Mellini
- Teresa Berganza
- Tomás Bretón
- Jorge Cardoso
- Pablo Casals
- Ruperto Chapí
- Miguel Ángel Coria
- Zulema de la Cruz
- José Cubiles
- Manuel de Falla
- Laura de las Heras
- Antón García Abril
- Luis Antonio García Navarro
- María Galvany
- Cristóbal Halffter
- Gareth Koch
- Sebastián Izquierdo Leal
- Ricardo Llorca
- Fernando Malvar-Ruiz
- Antonio Manuel Martínez Heredia
- Jaime Mendoza-Nava
- María José Montiel
- Manuel Ochoa
- Luis de Pablo
- Manuel Quiroga
- Miguel Roig-Francolí
- Amadeo Roldán
- Alejandro Román
- Ángel Rubio y Laínez
- Dulce María Serret
- Francisco Tarrega
- Marcos Vidal
- Fernando Velázquez Sáiz
- Joaquín Turina
- Octavio Vazquez
- Miguel del Barco Gallego

== Professors ==
- Pedro Albéniz
- Emilio Arrieta
- Rafael Benedito Vives
- Francisco Calés Otero
- Francisco Calés Pina
- Conrado del Campo
- Ramón Carnicer y Batlle
- Pau Casals
- Teresa Catalán
- Alicia Díaz de la Fuente
- Arturo Dúo Vital
- Miguel Hilarión Eslava
- Óscar Esplá
- Manuel Fernández Alberdi
- Enrique Fernández Arbós
- Antonio Fernández Bordas
- Ismael Fernández de la Cuesta
- Manuel Fernández Grajal
- Tomás Fernández Grajal
- Gaspar Ángel Tortosa Urrea
- Carlos Gómez Amat
- Julio Gómez García
- Alberto Gómez
- Ana Guijarro
- Jesús Guridi
- Ángel Huidobro
- Enrique Iniesta
- José Inzenga
- Ildefonso Jimeno de Lerma
- José de Aranguren y de Añivarro
- Antonio López Almagro
- Juan Medina
- Víctor Mirecki Larramat
- Jesús de Monasterio
- Laura Nieto Oliver
- Ángel Manuel Olmos
- Julia Parody
- Bartolomé Pérez Casas
- Alejandro Román
- Juan Ruiz Casaux
- Vicente Spiteri
- Juan Tellería
- José Tragó
- Joaquín Turina
- Mariano Vázquez Gómez
- Dámaso Zabalza
- Alicia Díaz de la Fuente
- Consuelo Díez Fernández
