= Ángel Manuel Olmos =

Spanish musicologist and entrepreneur (born 1974)

Angel Manuel Olmos
- Born: Ángel Manuel Olmos Sáez; June 17, 1974 (age 51); Madrid, Spain
- Occupations: Musicologist and entrepreneur
- Years active: 2000-present
- Known for: Professor at the Royal Conservatory of Music of Madrid. CEO and founder of eCauda and Expediatur.
- Notable work: Papeles Barbieri, full edition.

Ángel Manuel Olmos (born June 17, 1974, in Madrid, Spain) is a Spanish musicologist and entrepreneur. He was music technology and history professor at the University of La Rioja, Honorary Research Fellow at the University of Liverpool and is currently Professor of Musicology at the RCSMM.

== Early life and career ==
Olmos was born on June 17, 1974, in Madrid, Spain. He studied mining engineering at the Polytechnic University of Madrid and completed his bachelor's degree in musicology from the Madrid Royal Conservatory in 2000. He received a doctorate of music history and musicology from the Paris-Sorbonne University and PhD in economics from the University of Alcalá.

He is currently Professor of Musicology and is accredited as University Professor by the National Agency for Quality Assessment and Accreditation. He has also been a professor at the University of La Rioja, Escuela Superior de Canto de Madrid, and Honorary Research Fellow for the University of Liverpool. He is the director and general editor of the transcription project Discantus in the National Library of Spain. He has published about fifteen books.

=== Research topics ===
- Renaissance music transmission
- White mensural notation
- Music economics
- Music history
- Big data and music features modeling
- Choral music
- Project management

=== Publications ===
- Papeles Barbieri. Edición completa, Discantus, Madrid 2018–2020, 19 vols.
- El Arte en los Protocolos. Archivo Histórico de Protocolos de Madrid, Instituto Europeo de Finanzas, Madrid 2018, 2 vols.
- “A New Identity for the “Medina” Attribution in the Cancionero Musical de Palacio”, New Perspectives on Early Music in Spain, Tess Knighton and Emilio Ros-Fábregas (eds.). Edition Reichenberger, Kassel 2015, p. 163-176
- “En torno al Cancionero Musical de Palacio y Cancionero Musical de Segovia. Análisis de su origen y utilidad”, Nassarre, vol. 28 (2012), p. 45-68
- “El testamento y muerte de Tomás Luis de Victoria. Nuevos familiares del músico y posible razón para su vuelta a España”, Revista de Musicología, vol. XXXV, nº1 (2012), p. 53-60
- “Filogenia y búsqueda de patrones en la música de los trovadores mediante la distancia Levenshtein”, Inter-American Music Review, vol. XVII (Summer 2007, n. 1–2), p. 49-64
- (con Luisa Morales) “Un nuevo y breve tratado de órgano y monacordio del siglo XVII en un libro de poemas de Antonio Hurtado de Mendoza”, en Morales, Luisa (Ed.): Cinco Siglos de Música de Tecla Española, ISBN 978-84-611-8235-0 (Leal, 2007), p. 207-218
- “Las obras de Tomás Luis de Victoria en la tablatura para órgano de Pelplin (Polonia), Biblioteka Seminarium, 304–8, 308a (1620-1630)”, en Morales, Luisa (Ed.): Cinco Siglos de Música de Tecla Española, ISBN 978-84-611-8235-0 (Leal, 2007), p. 87-124
- Catálogo de Música Manuscrita, Catálogo de la Real Biblioteca, Tomo XV, Patrimonio Nacional, 2006. Cataloga los fondos musicales del siglo XV-XVI y parte de la música religiosa del s. XIX.
- “Tomás Luis de Victoria et le monastère des ‘Descalzas’ à Madrid : réfutation d’un mythe”, Le Jardin de Musique, I/2, (2004) p. 121-128
- “New polyphonic fragments from 15th-century Spain: a preliminary report”, Early Music, vol. 32, issue 2, p. 244-251
- “La influencia de Orlando di Lasso en la obra coral religiosa ‘a capella’ de Francis Poulenc”, Revista de Musicología, ISSN 0210-1459, Vol. 27, Nº 1, 2004 (Ejemplar dedicado a: Actas del Simposio Internacional "El motu proprio de San Pío X y la música (1903-2003)"), p. 273-286
- “Aportaciones a la temprana historia musical de la capilla de las Descalzas Reales (1587-1608)”, Revista de Musicología, vol. XXVI, nº 2 2003, p. 439-489
- “La ubicación del texto literario en los cancioneros de los siglos XV y XVI. El uso del ennegrecimiento como ligadura”, Revista de Musicología, vol. XXV, nº2 (2002), p. 337-346
- “L’acoustique chez Francisco Tovar et les théoriciens du début du 16ème siècle : le tapage des sphères”, De la lexicologie à la théorie et à la pratique musicale, Louis Jambou (ed.), Éditions Hispaniques, Paris 2002, ISBN 2-85355-060-5, p. 31-41
- “El uso de trazos y puntos como ayuda para la ubicación del texto literario en los cancioneros franceses y españoles de finales del siglo XV y comienzos del XVI”, Revista de Musicología, vol. XXIV (2001), p. 89-105
