= María Galvany =

Spanish soprano

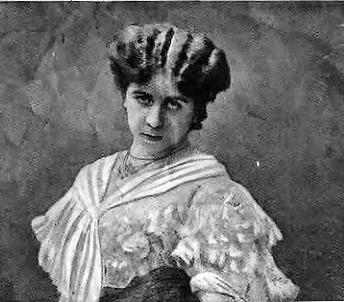
Maria Galvany as seen on a Court Circular for an 1899 concert at Buckingham Palace

María Galvany (born María Galván, 6 August 1875 – 2 August 1927) was a Spanish coloratura soprano who had an international performance career from 1896 until her retirement in 1916. She opened a singing school in Spain at the time that she retired. Earlier literature published on Galvany has confused her with another soprano, Maria Rollas Galvani, who had retired to Brazil and died there in the 1940s. This error was first corrected in a 2004 publication in The Opera Quarterly. However, that work erroneously reported that she died in the Spanish flu epidemic in 1918. A 2016 biography on Galvany written by José A. García López corrected errors in the dating and location of her birth and death, as well as questioned reporting on later performances after 1916.

== Biography ==
Multiple sources state that María Galvany was born in Granada in 1878. However, more recent scholarship by biographer José A. García López published in his book María Galvany, a diva in Pinos Puente (2016, Fundación Caja Rural Granada) states that she was born with the name María Galván in Mancha Real, Province of Jaén on August 6, 1875. According to García López her father was a notary in Mancha Real and she was the youngest of his ten children. At the age of two she was sent to live with her maternal grandparents in Pinos Puente.

Galvany began studies at the Madrid Royal Conservatory in the 1888-1889 academic year, and studied there for a period of five years. Her teachers there included Lázaro María Puig and Napoleone Verger. Multiple sources state she made her operatic debut in the title role of Gaetano Donizetti's Lucia di Lammermoor at Cartagena in 1897. However, García López dates her debut earlier to June 1896 in Valencia when she replaced soprano Ida Saroglia in Emilio Giovannini's opera company as both Donizetti's Lucia and as Amina in Bellini's La sonnambula. This was followed by a successful tour of Catalonia, and she was featured on the front cover of the magazine La Tomasa on October 8, 1896.

Galvany married Carlos de Tejada Cañete in 1896. In February 1897 she was engaged at the Teatro de Reus where she appeared as Violetta in La traviata and Rosina in The Barber of Seville while pregnant with her first child, Juana Irene de Tejada Galván. After Juana's birth in Pinos Puente, Galvany resumed performing at the Teatro Municipal Isabel la Católica in Granada in June 1897 where her repertoire included Gilda in Rigoletto and the title role in Dinorah among other repertoire. She continued with success as a coloratura soprano in theaters in Spain, Italy, Portugal, and South America; along the way italianizing her surname to first Galvani and later Galvany. Some of the other operas in her repertoire included Hamlet, Lakmé, and Les Huguenots.

In 1901 Galvany was engaged at the Teatro Dal Verme in Milan, and in 1903 she appeared as Bellini's Amina in Parma. She performed in Brazil, Uruguay, Argentina, and Chile in 1901. She also had success in the Russian Empire in performances given in 1901 and 1905. She was a popular singer at theaters in St. Petersburg, Kiev, Odessa, Tbilisi, Baku, and Moscow. With her own opera troupe she toured Holland, Belgium and France in 1905. She repeated Amina at the Theatre Royal, Drury Lane in London in 1909; also singing there as Rosina in The Barber of Seville and in the title role of Dinorah. At the invitation of Queen Alexandra, she performed at Buckingham Palace in 1909.

In the 1910s Galvany performed in Berlin, Belgium, and Warsaw. According to García López her engagements moved increasingly toward concert work at this point in her career, and she gave her last performance in May 1916 at the Teatro Victoria Eugenia at which pointed she retired permanently and opened a singing school. Other sources claim she continued performing after this date; including appearing in vaudeville in San Francisco, California, United States in 1918.

Some publications, such as J. B. Steane's entry in Grove Music Online state Galvany retired to Brazil where she died in poverty in Rio de Janeiro on November 2, 1944. The Grosses Sängerlexikon makes a similar claim but with a different death date of December 14, 1949. However, Limansky's 2004 article in The Opera Quarterly states that the woman who died in Brazil was a different soprano, Maria Rollas Galvani, and that Galvany died in the Spanish flu epidemic in 1918. All of these are contradicted by García López who states she died on Urbano Street in Madrid, on August 3, 1927, at the age of 52. This date is further supported by an obituary reporting Galvany's death published in El Defensor de Granada on August 16, 1927. An obituary was also published in La Libertad on August 5, 1927.

== Recordings ==
L'incantatrice
Maria Galvany's breath-taking vocal virtuosity is evident in this 1907 recorded version of Luigi Arditi's "L'incantatrice"

Galvany made acoustic records for four different companies. Her earliest recordings date back to 1903 and were cut by the Gramophone and Typewriter Company (G&T). Later on, she recorded for Pathé Records and came back to G&T in 1906, where she made her most popular discs, including ensembles with major stars of her time, such as Fernando de Lucia and Titta Ruffo, as well as with less well remembered singers like Aristodemo Giorgini, Remo Andreini and Andrea Perelló de Segurola. She also made several records for the Edison Company around 1911. Her repertoire consisted mainly of Italian opera arias, zarzuela pieces and concert songs. Sadly, only a few of her recordings are preserved or have been reissued for the general public, so no exact discography exists.

Her surviving recordings have been described as controversial in terms of their artistic worth. They feature elaborate coloratura passages with rapid staccato and other vocal effects, which some listeners have found comic. Her high E flats have been compared to a whistling kettle.

This negative view is supported to some extent by her repeated interpolation of flute/voice cadenzas, sometimes twice during the same aria, that often have no relation to the original piece. Such practices were fairly common in her era, however, when performers often took a less literal view of the written notes of a composer's score. In addition, the natural timbre of Galvany's upper register did not record well, which often results in an irritating, wiry sound that is unappealing to most modern ears. Also, her interpretations are burdened with rapid tempi, a hard vibrato, unexpected register shifts and throat-clearing sounds, together with section cuts caused by the limited duration of 78-rpm discs.

On the other hand, Galvany is admired for her middle register, remarkable sense of pitch, and ability to dispatch complicated fioritura. Her duets with the baritone Titta Ruffo are some of her best known recordings today.

== Sources ==
- Leo Riemens. Notes to the Maria Galvany's Lebendige Vergangenheit CD. Historic Recordings, Austro Mechana. 2003.
- García López, José A. (2016). María Galvany, una diva en Pinos Puente. Fundación Caja Rural Granada. ISBN 978-8460889496.
