= Georges Mathias =

French composer, pianist and teacher

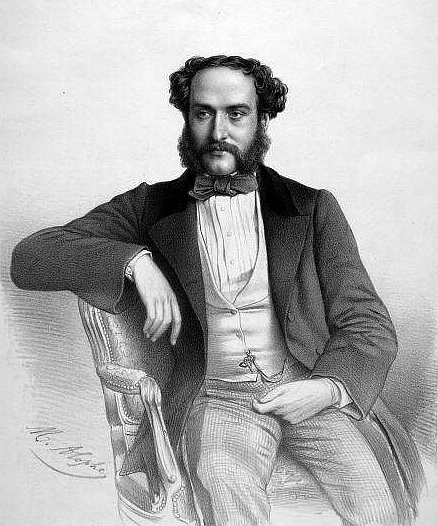
- Georges Mathias
- Born: 14 October 1826; Paris, France
- Died: 14 October 1910 (aged 84); Paris, France
- Occupation: Composer

Georges Amédée Saint-Clair Mathias (French: [matjas]; 14 October 1826 – 14 October 1910) was a French composer, pianist and teacher. Alongside his teaching work, Georges Mathias was a very active concert pianist.

== Biography ==
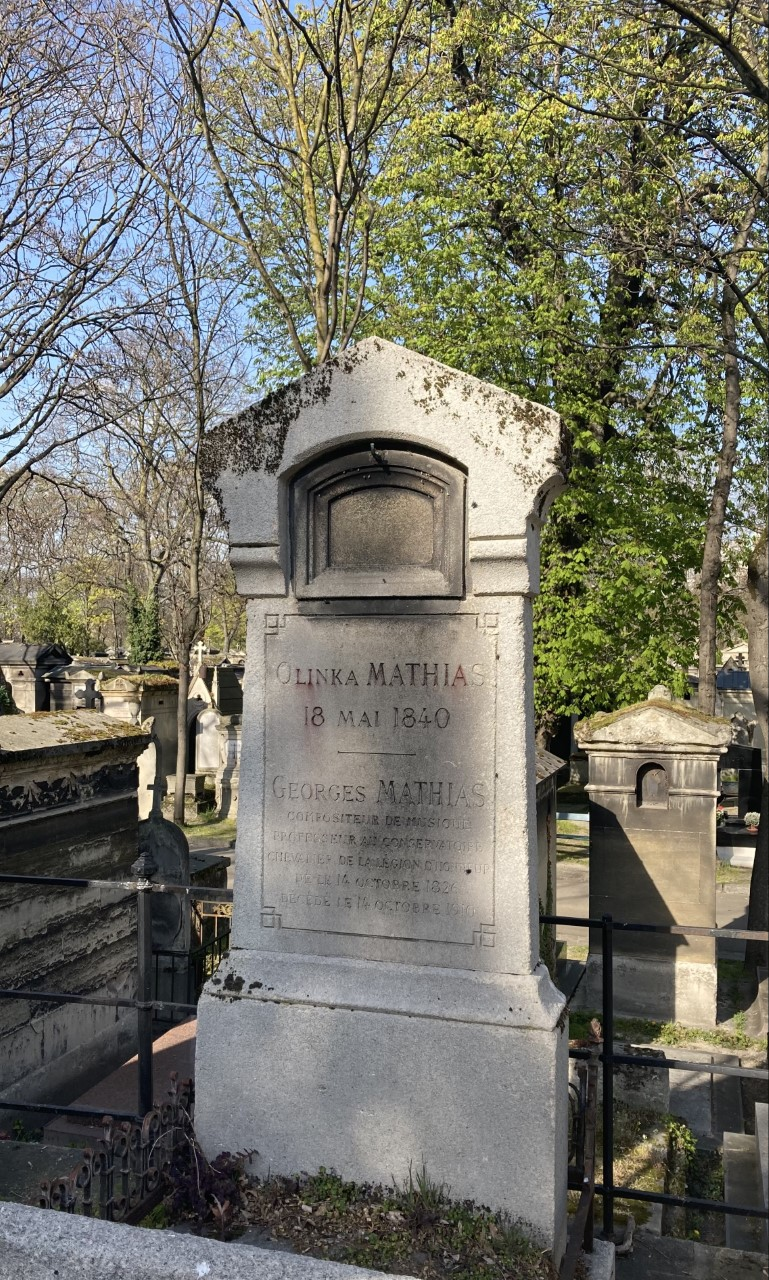
Grave of Mathias.

Mathias was born in Paris. He studied at the Conservatoire de Paris with François Bazin, Auguste Barbereau, Augustin Savard and Fromental Halévy. Privately, he studied composition with Friedrich Kalkbrenner and piano with Frédéric Chopin.

After finishing his studies, he taught piano at the Conservatoire from 1862 to 1893. Among his notable students were Teresa Carreño, Camille Chevillard, Paul Dukas, Camille Erlanger, James Huneker, Henri O'Kelly, Isidor Philipp, Raoul Pugno, Alfonso Rendano, Erik Satie, Eugénie Satie-Barnetche, Ernest Schelling, Ernesto Elorduy, José Tragó and Alberto Williams.

Mathias and Karol Mikuli, another student of Chopin, significantly influenced the way their teacher's style was communicated to later generations of musicians. Besides teaching, Mathias was also active as a concert pianist. On 14 March 1864, he was the principal pianist at the premiere of Gioachino Rossini's Petite messe solennelle.

He was awarded the Legion of Honour in 1872. He died in Paris in 1910, on his 84th birthday.

== Works ==
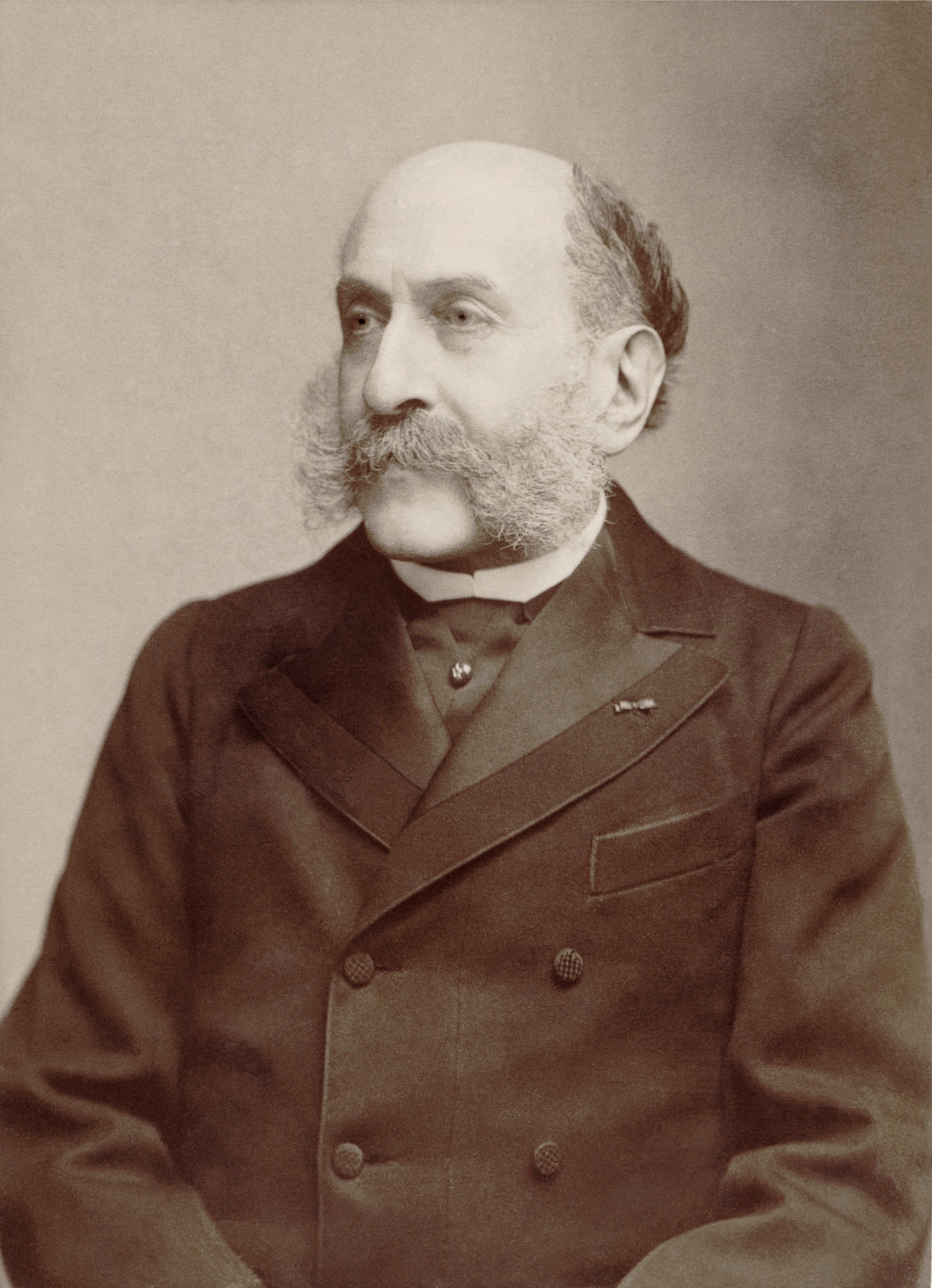
Georges Mathias

His compositions include overtures to Hamlet and Mazeppa, five morceaux symphoniques for piano and strings, two piano concertos, six piano trios, a symphony, Oeuvres choisies pour le piano, Études de genre, Études de style et de mécanisme, a collection of two and four-hand piano pieces, and transcriptions including the one of some scenes from Mozart's The Magic Flute.
