= Aimé Leborne =

French composer and music educator (1797-1866)

Aimé Ambroise Simon Leborne (or Aimé Le Borne) (29 December 1797 – 2 April 1866) was a French composer and music educator, who made his career in Paris.

== Life ==
Born in Brussels, Leborne was the son of an actor and spent his youth in Versailles where he learned the violin. Leborne then studied at the Conservatoire de Paris where he was a pupil of Victor Dourlen for harmony and Luigi Cherubini for composition. In 1818, he obtained the second Prix de Rome for the cantata Jeanne d'Arc and in 1820, the First Grand Prix de Rome for the scene Sophonisbe. That same year, he was appointed professor of solfège. In 1836, he succeeded Antoine Reicha as teacher of the counterpoint and fugue class. In 1840, he became professor of composition. Leborne wrote a Traité d'harmonie which was not published. He reissued Charles-Simon Catel's Traité complet d'harmonie. Among his pupils were Louis-Aimé Maillart, César Franck, Adolphe Deslandres and Victorin de Joncières.

In 1829, he was appointed librarian at the Paris Opera, then in 1834 King's Music Librarian, and in 1853 Imperial Chapel Librarian.

== Selected works ==
- Les Deux Figaros (1827)
- Le Camp du Drap d'or (1828)
- Cinq ans d'entracte, opéra comique (premiered on 15 June 1833)
- Lequel?, one-act opéra comique (libretto by Paul Duport and François Ancelot, premiered on 21 March 1838
- Traité d'harmonie

== Bibliography ==
- Fauquet, Joël-Marie (2003). Dictionnaire de la Musique en France au XIXe siècle (in French). Paris: Fayard. ISBN 2-213-59316-7.
