= Ángel Rubio y Laínez =

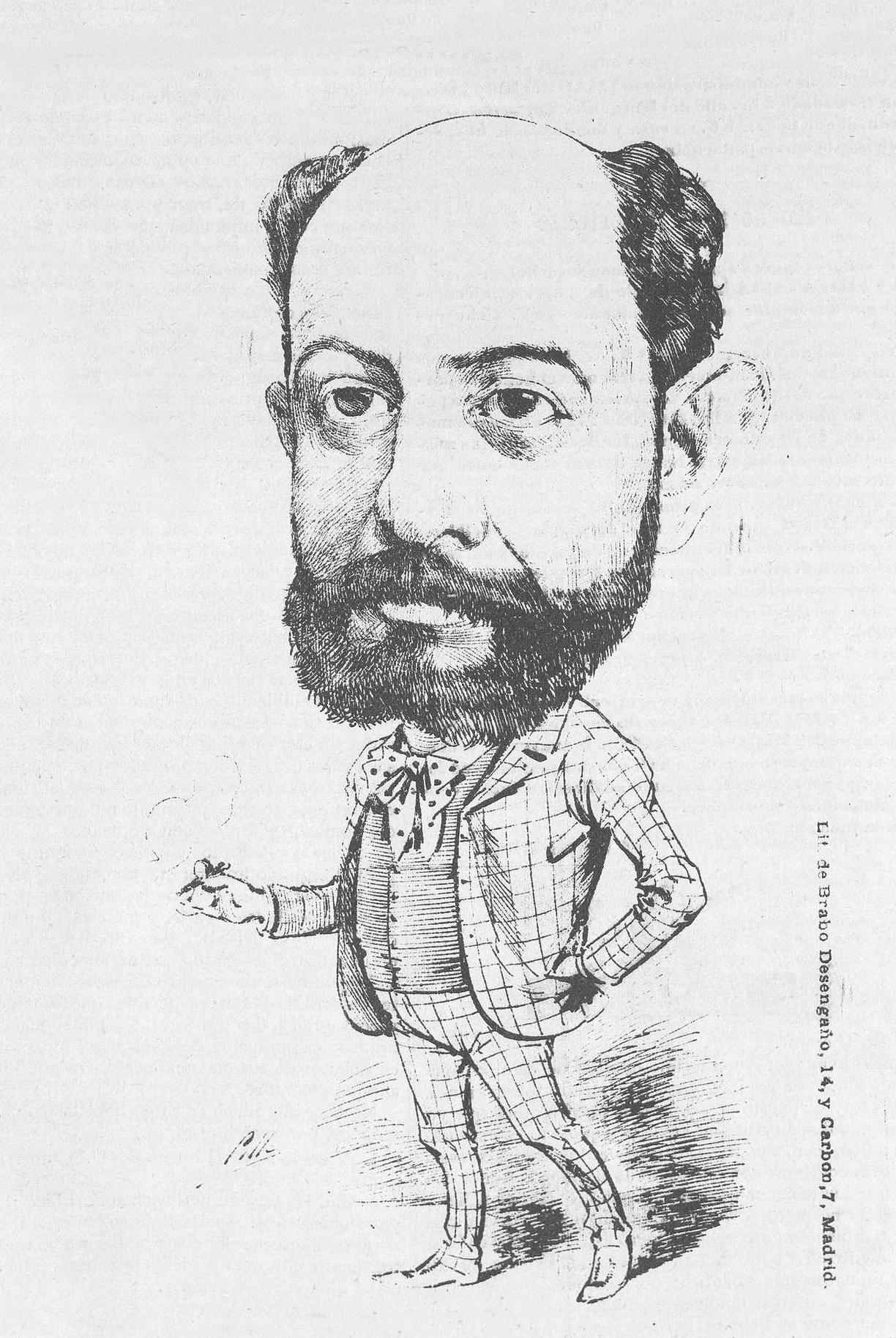
1885 sketch of Ángel Rubio y Laínez

Ángel Rubio y Laínez, sometimes shortened to Ángel Rubio, (27 November 1846, Madrid – 9 April 1906, Vicálvaro) was a Spanish composer. Trained at the Madrid Royal Conservatory, he was a prolific composer of zarzuelas. He created more than 100 of these light operas; mostly writing in the one-act género chico genre. Two of his best known operas were Dos canarios de café (1882) and ¡Al agua, patos! (1888).
