= Amalia Anglès y Mayer =

Spanish soprano, guitarist (1827–1859)

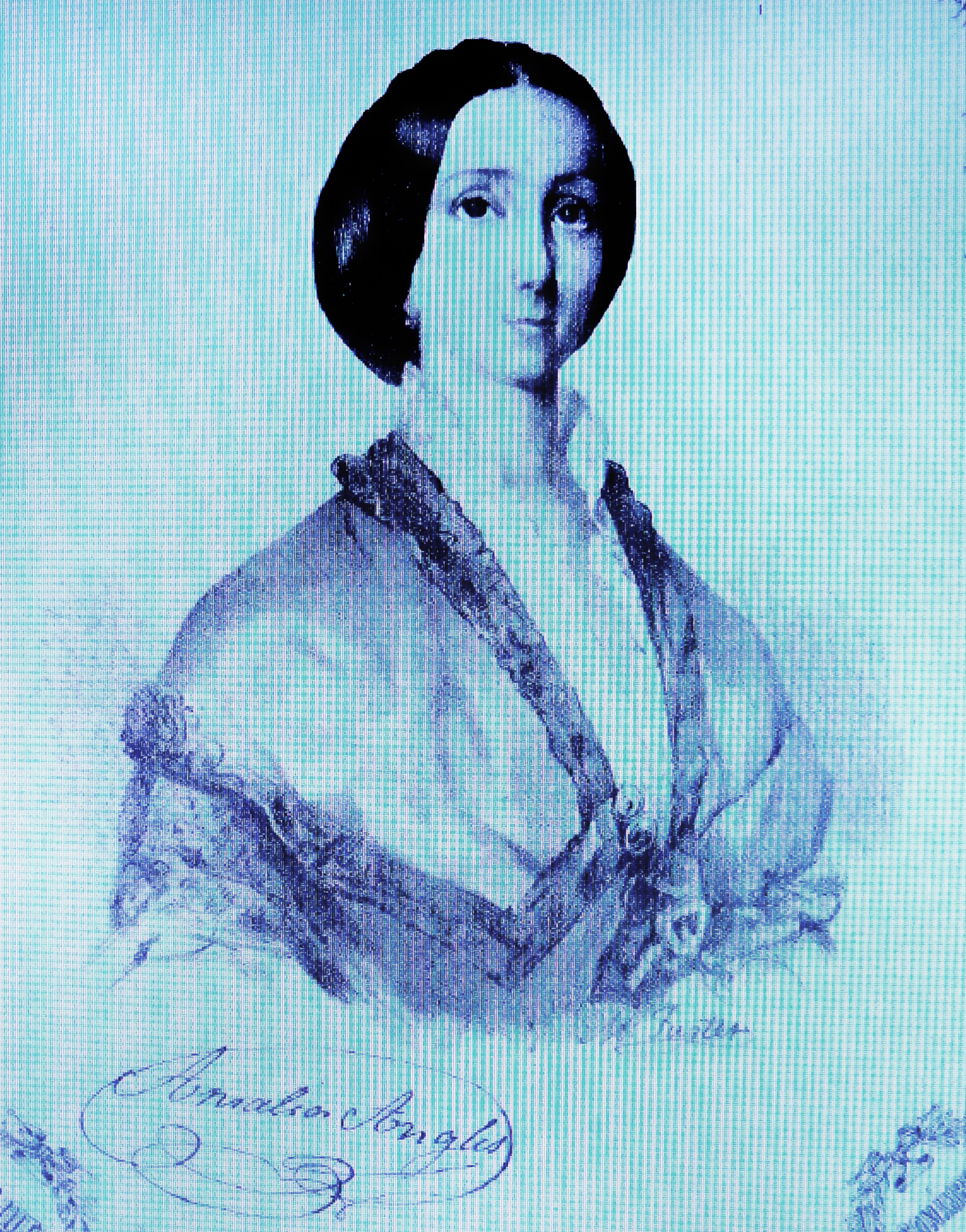
- Born: 3 November 1827; Badajoz, Spain
- Died: 1 May 1859 (aged 31); Stuttgart, Germany
- Education: Madrid Royal Conservatory
- Occupations: Soprano, guitarist

Amalia Anglés y Mayer or Amalia Anglés y Moya or Angles Mayer de Fortuny (3 November 1827 – 1 May 1859), was a Spanish soprano opera singer and guitarist. She has been called "one of the most precocious and important singers of the 19th century in Spain." She died suddenly at 31.

== Biography ==
She was born in Badajoz in 1827. She made her voice and her love for music known in Santander, Spain. From the age of 12, and without any official studies, she was performing difficult exercises and complicated pieces on the guitar. She moved to the capital to study at the Madrid Royal Conservatory of Music, where she enrolled in October 1839 in the music theory class, and finished her studies in October 1852 with a singing class.

At the Conservatory, it became clear that she had a splendid soprano voice, which benefited from the instruction of the maestro Francisco Frontera de Valldemosa, known as one of the most famous music teachers in Spain.

After earning outstanding grades in all her subjects, Spain's Queen Maria Cristina chose her to be the teacher of her two eldest daughters, who would later become Isabel II and the Duchess of Montpensier. At just 24 years old, Amalia Anglés already enjoyed fame as a music teacher and moved to Italy. Hired by the Milanese theatre La Scala, she performed there for 19 consecutive nights, thereby arousing praise from the Italian press.

After that contract ended, she went to London, England, and Lisbon, Portugal, before returning to Italy and later traveling to Prussia and Germany. She died suddenly in Stuttgart, Germany, on 1 May 1859 at 31.

Upon her death, Mariano Gelabert y Correa published a biography of the artist along with an obituary. He dedicated these words to her:

"Genius, that trait of Divinity, which illuminates privileged intelligences, a sublime gift that the Almighty grants to some of his creatures, took up residence worthily in the imagination and soul of Amalia Anglés, and, hovering its wings over the pure forehead of the inspired artist, made her name immortal."

According to one source,

It is not surprising that Rossini, after hearing her in Bologna, reportedly exclaimed: “My God! This is singing, not shouting! Da capo, my lark!”
