= José Tragó =

Spanish pianist and composer (1856–1934)

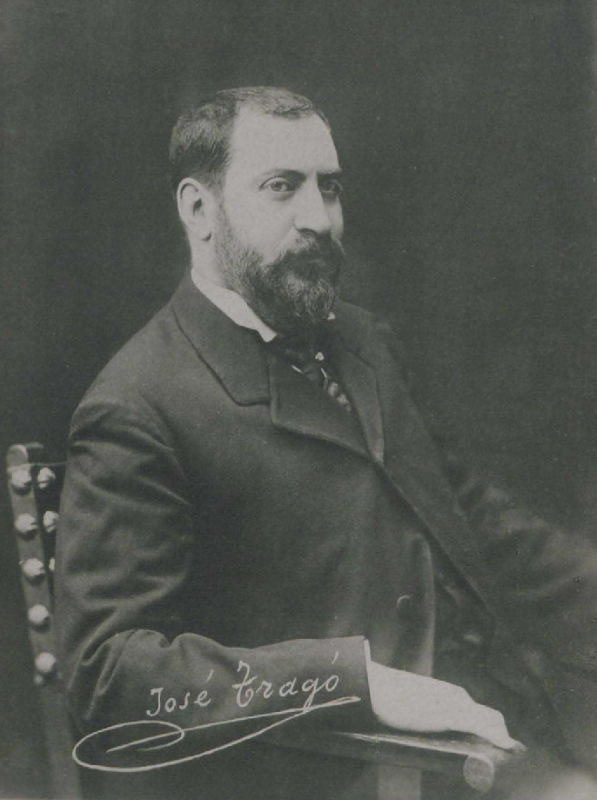
- Tragó, c. 1890
- Born: José Tragó y Arana; 1856; Madrid, Spain
- Died: 1934 (aged 77–78)
- Occupations: Pianist; composer
- Employer: Madrid Royal Conservatory

José Tragó y Arana (Madrid, 1856–1934) was a Spanish pianist and composer.

== Biography ==
He studied in Paris with Georges Mathias, a student of Chopin, and was classmates with Isaac Albéniz. He taught piano at the Madrid Royal Conservatory. Among his students were Manuel de Falla, Joaquín Turina, José Muñoz Molleda, Dulce María Serret, Vicente Zurrón, Javier Alfonso, soprano Fidela Campiña, composer María Rodrigo and many others.
