= Saint-Vincent-de-Paul, Paris =

Church in Paris

Coordinates: 48°52′44″N 2°21′07″E

Church of Saint-Vincent-de-Paul, Paris
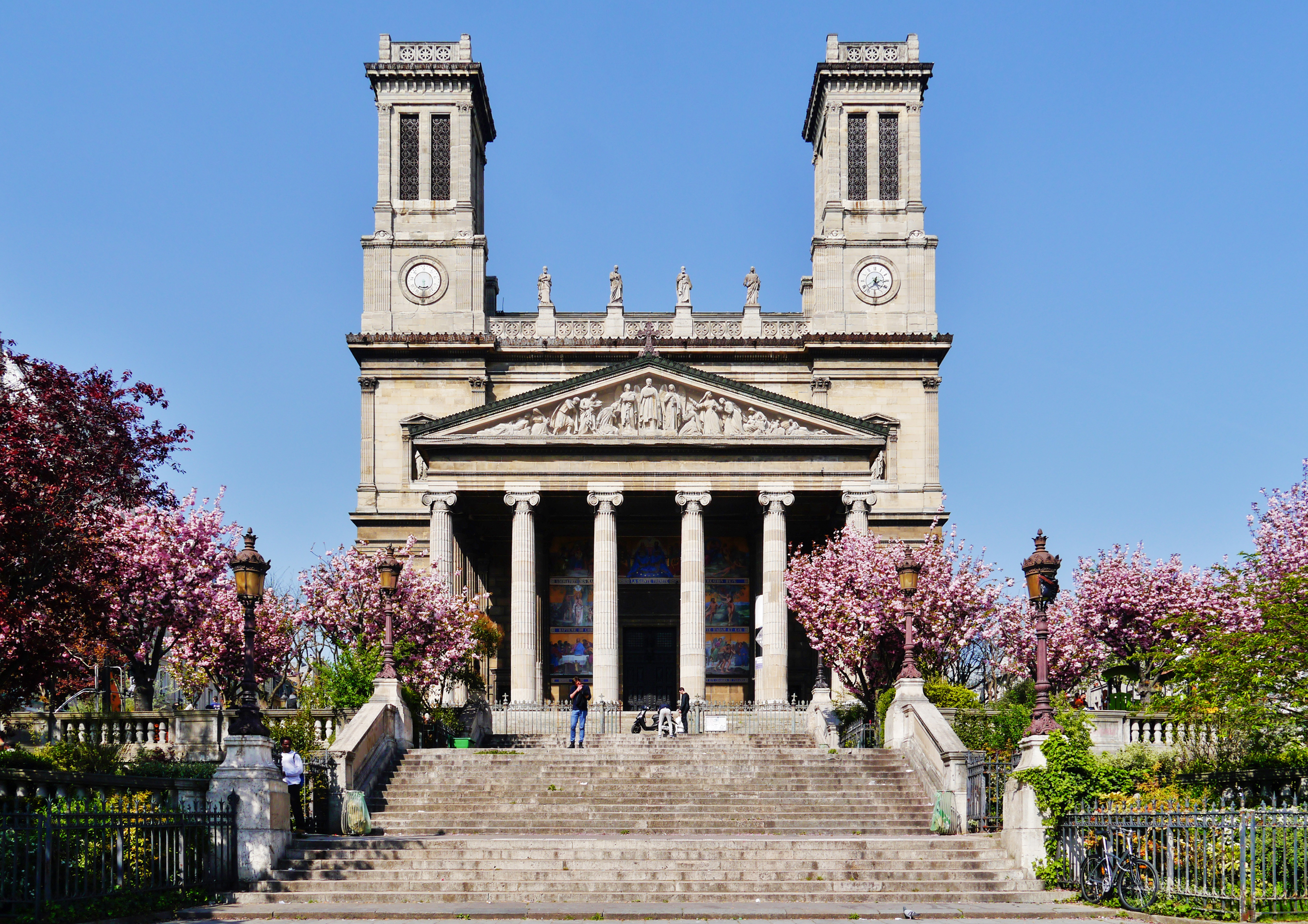
- Church of Saint-Vincent-de-Paul, Paris

Religion
- Affiliation: Catholic Church
- Province: Archdiocese of Paris
- Region: Île-de-France
- Rite: Roman Rite
- Status: Active

Location
- Location: Place Franz-Lizst, 75010 Paris
- State: France
- Interactive map of Church of Saint-Vincent-de-Paul, Paris

Architecture
- Architect: Jacques-Ignace Hittorff
- Style: Neo-classical
- Groundbreaking: 1824
- Completed: 1844

Website
- paroissesvp.fr

The Church of Saint-Vincent-de-Paul (French: Église Saint-Vincent-de-Paul, pronounced [eɡliz sɛ̃ vɛ̃sɑ̃ də pɔl]) is a church in the 10th arrondissement of Paris dedicated to Saint Vincent de Paul. It gives its name to the Quartier Saint-Vincent-de-Paul around it. It was built between 1824 and 1844 on the site where an earlier priory of Saint-Lazare had been located, at which Saint Vincent de Paul had founded the congregation of the Priests of the Mission, known as the Lazarists. The architect who completed the building was Jacques-Ignace Hittorff, whose other major works included the Gare du Nord railway station. The church is in the Neo-classical style.

== History ==
=== Site and Patron ===
In the 12th century, the site was occupied by a Leper Colony, located in a marshy area on the road between Paris and the Basilica of Saint-Denis. It became the home and workplace of Saint Vincent de Paul (1581–1660), who devoted his life to aiding the poor and sick. In 1625 he founded the Congregation of the Priests of the Mission, whose member became known as Lazarists. He also created a congregation known as the Daughters of Charity and, in 1638, began a project for aiding abandoned infants. He was beatified in 1729 and canonised as a saint in 1737. The site was occupied by his creation, the Congregation of the Mission, until the French Revolution.

=== Hospital and Prison ===
A hospital for lepers was founded during the time of Saint Vincent de Paul. Shortly before the French Revolution, this building was transformed into the Saint-Lazare Prison, which rapidly filled to overflowing during the Revolution. Notable prisoners before the Revolution included the playwright and diplomat Pierre Beaumarchais and the social theorist Henri de Saint-Simon. During the Revolution it held the poet André Chénier, who went to the guillotine; the painter Hubert Robert, who escaped the guillotine after the death of Robespierre, and was named director of the Louvre museum; and the Marquis de Sade, who also escaped the guillotine after the fall of Robespierre. Later prisoners included the spy Mata Hari. The last structures of the prison were not demolished until 1935.

=== Construction of the church (1824–1844) ===
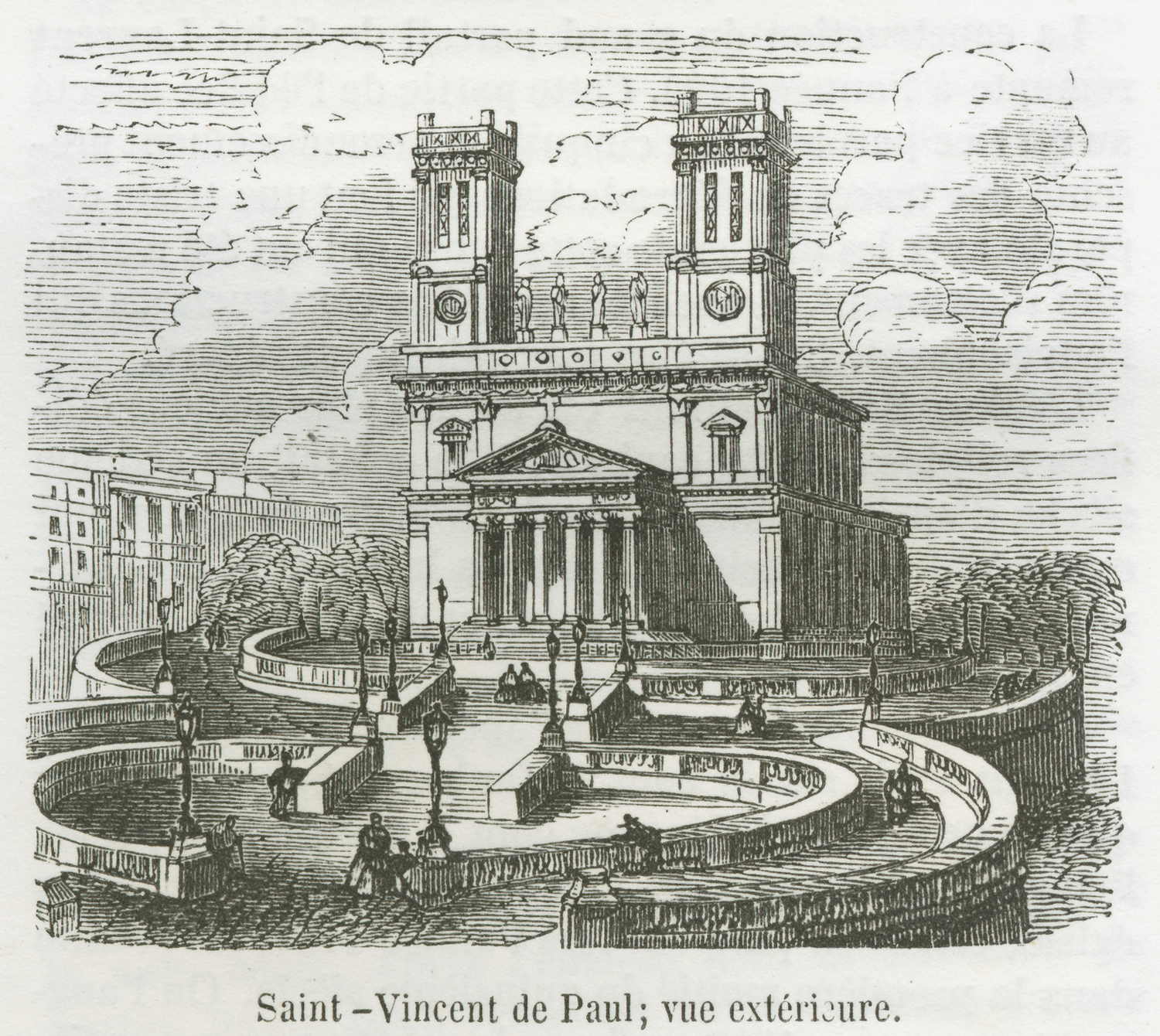
The church in 1855

In the early 19th century the population of the area grew rapidly, and the church project was begun. The church's design and the initial phases of its construction were made by architect Jean-Baptiste Lepère, a French architect of modest reputation. He was a member of the committee of artists and scientists, who travelled with Napoleon on his expedition to Egypt, where he drew the temples and monuments, and helped make the first study of the feasibility of the Suez Canal. The first stone of the church was laid in August 1824 in the presence of the préfet de la Seine Gaspard de Chabrol and the archbishop of Paris Mgr de Quélen. Work proceeded slowly, and was repeatedly halted, particularly due to a lack of credit following the 1830 Revolution.

In 1831, the project was taken over by Lepère's son-in-law, Jacques Hittorff, whose most famous later work was the Gare du Nord railway station. Hittorff modified the initial plans, adding two bell towers. The church was sited overlooking Place Franz Liszt, at the top of a long stairway. Hittorff added two ramps, now made into gardens, so that horse-drawn carriages could access the front of the church. The building opened for worship on 25 October 1844.

== Exterior ==
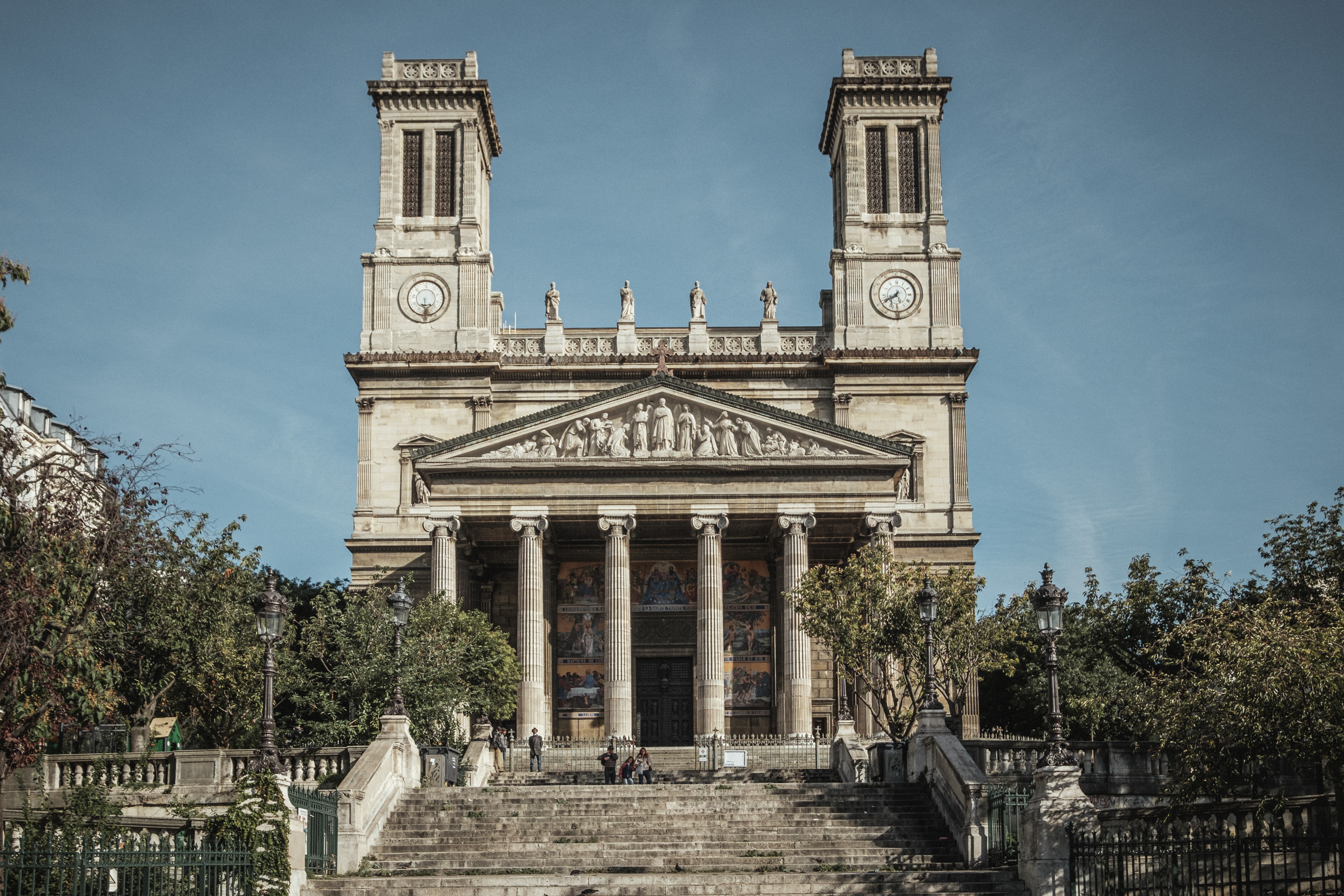
St. Vincent de Paul church facade

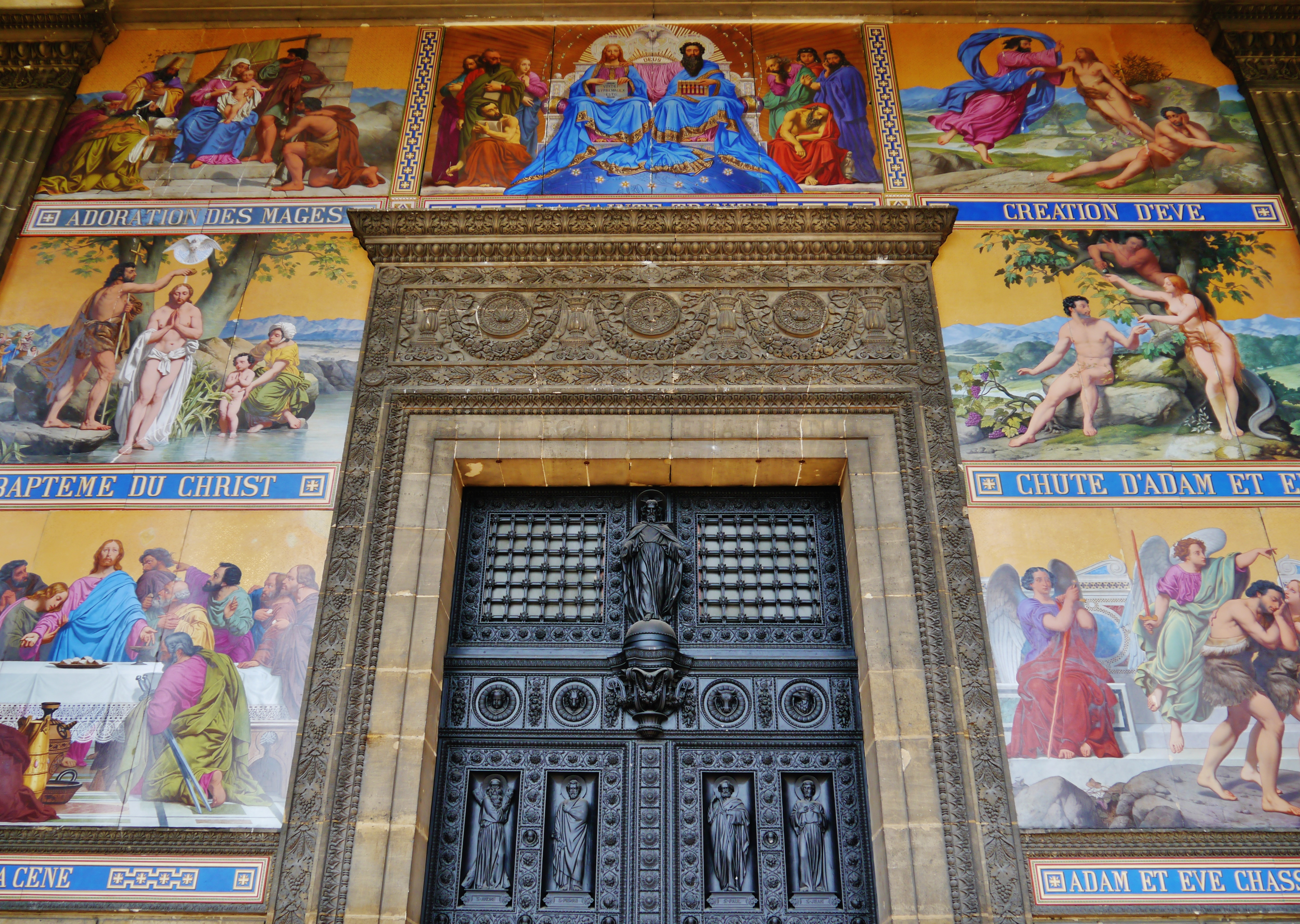
Decor of the portal

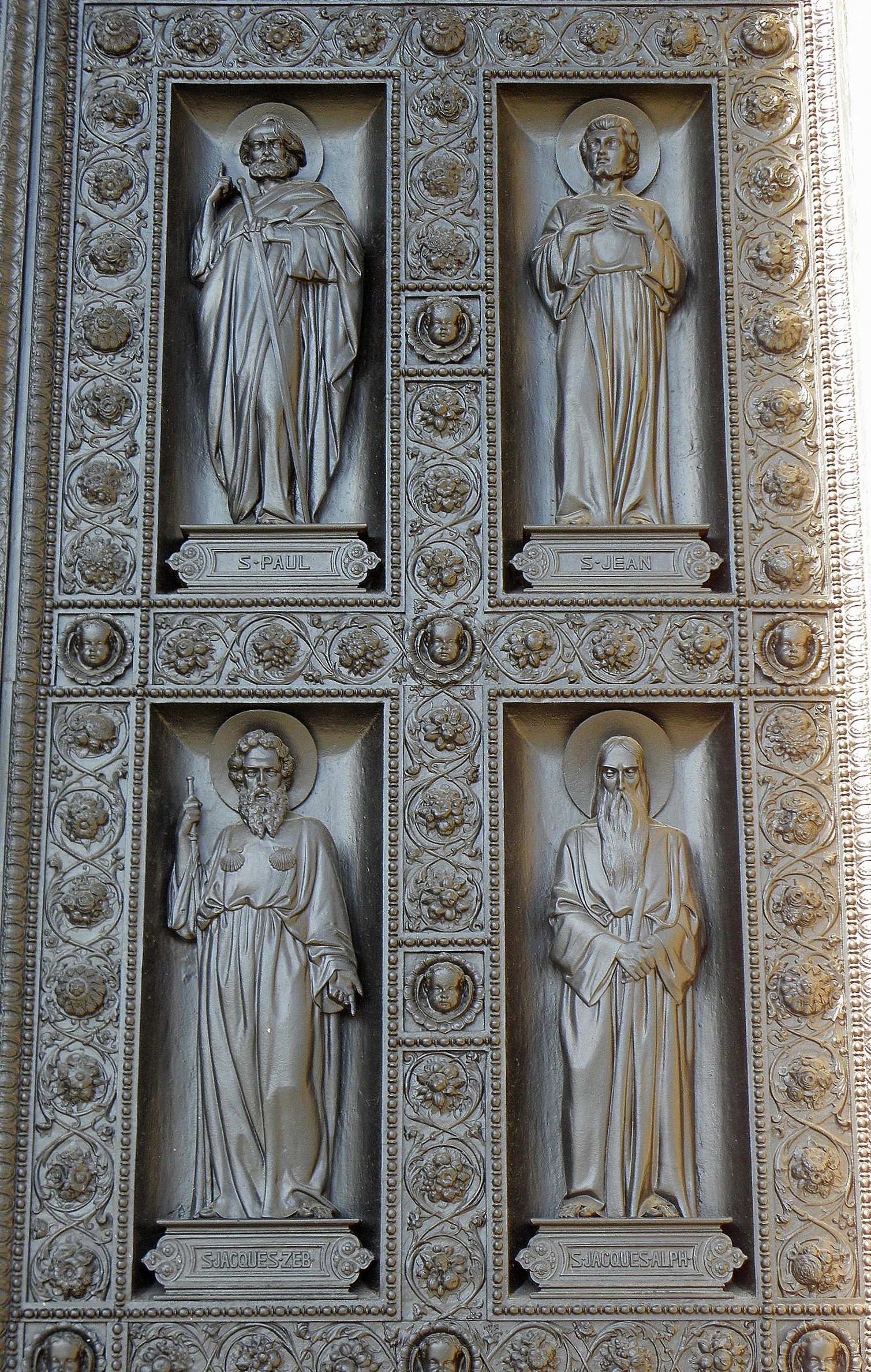
Sculpture of Four Apostles on central portal

The new church was sited to overlook large square, It was preceded by two large ramps in a horseshoe form, which allowed carriages to access the square in front of the church. The square has now been transformed into gardens. A long stairway leads up to the monumental neo-classical front. flanked by two bell towers. The portico of the church features twelve classical columns, with Ionic capitals, symbolizing the Twelve Apostles. The triangular fronton above is filled with high-relief sculpture which depicts the glorification of Saint Vincent de Paul. It was made by sculptor Charles-François Leboeuf-Nanteuil (1792–1865), and shows the Saint flanked by two angels, representing the virtues of Faith and Charity. The front is flanked by two bell towers.

The church's basilical plan evokes several grand schemes of religious architecture without specifically copying one in particular. Above the portico, a feature borrowed from Greek temple architecture, is a pediment sculpted by Charles-François Lebœuf-Nanteuil on the subject of "The Apotheosis of Saint Vincent-de-Paul": the saint is glorified, surrounded by figures symbolising his saintly actions: a missionary, a galley slave, and some Daughters of Charity devoting themselves to children or to healing the sick. The decoration of the Lady Chapel, in the apse added later at the back (in eight panels), is by William-Adolphe Bouguereau (1884–89). The Calvary shown on the main altar is by François Rude.

The building suffered during the Paris Commune: the bell towers were hit by seven shells, and the terrace and ramps by more than twenty, all fired from the Père Lachaise Cemetery.

The Church of Saint-Vincent-de-Paul is close to the Eurostar and mainline station Gare du Nord, and so is twinned with St Pancras Old Church, a church close to St Pancras railway station in London where Eurostar services terminate. This twinning was inaugurated on 11 December 2007 with a bilingual service at St Pancras Old Church.

== Interior ==
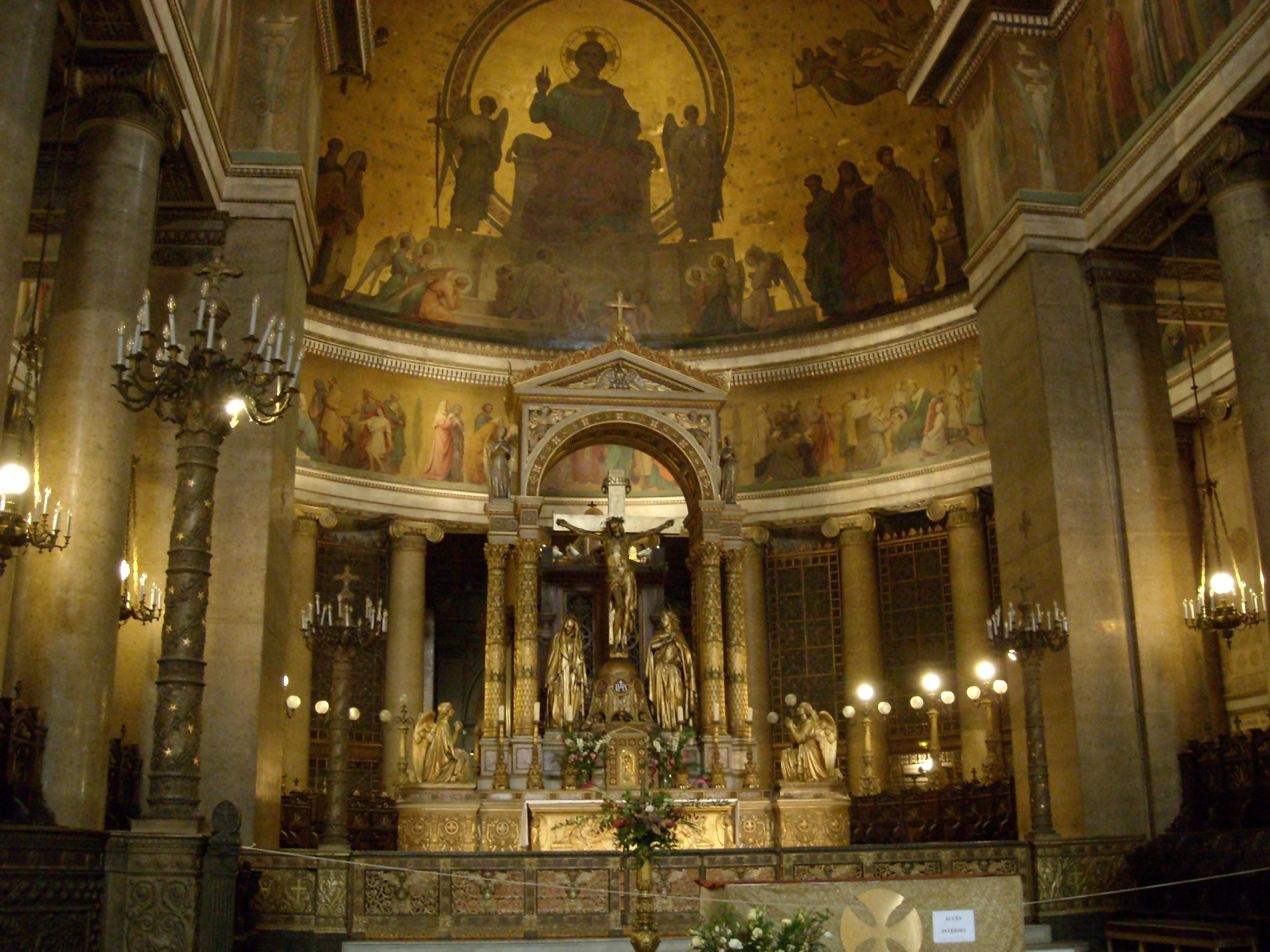
Choir and main altar

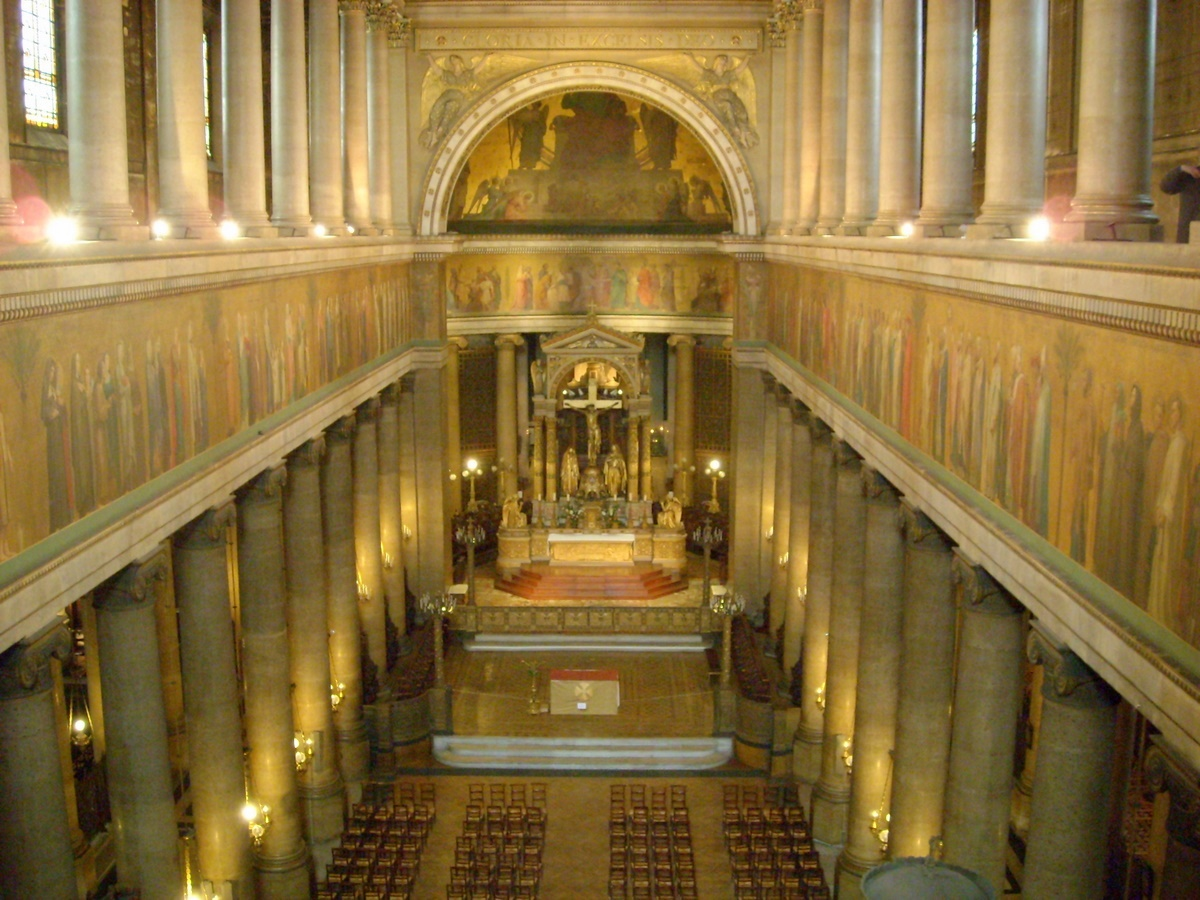
The nave and apse from the west end tribune

The nave is composed in the classical style, with two levels of columns: those on the lower level have Ionic style capitals, while the capitals on the upper level columns are in the Corinthin style. level with Corinthian style columns. The colonnades amplify the sensation of height and grandeur.

The two levels are separated by a frieze at the mid-level that runs from the portal to the cupola, on both sides of the church. Painted in 1848–53 against a gilded background, the work illustrates "The Mission of the Church," and depicts two hundred thirty-five figures, including saints, bishops, and martyrs. it runs from the organ over the entrance to the cupola, where it passes below the painting within the cupola of "Christ in Majesty". The frieze on the walls is the work of Hippolyte Flandrin, while "Christ in Majesty" is the work of Édouard Picot. One curiosity in the fresco is the figure of Pope Leo III, who has been given the features of the painter Ingres, a favorite of the artist Flandrin.

The ceiling of the church has a double-slope wooden coffered ceiling very richly decorated with carving and polychrome inlays depicting a variety of Christian symbols.

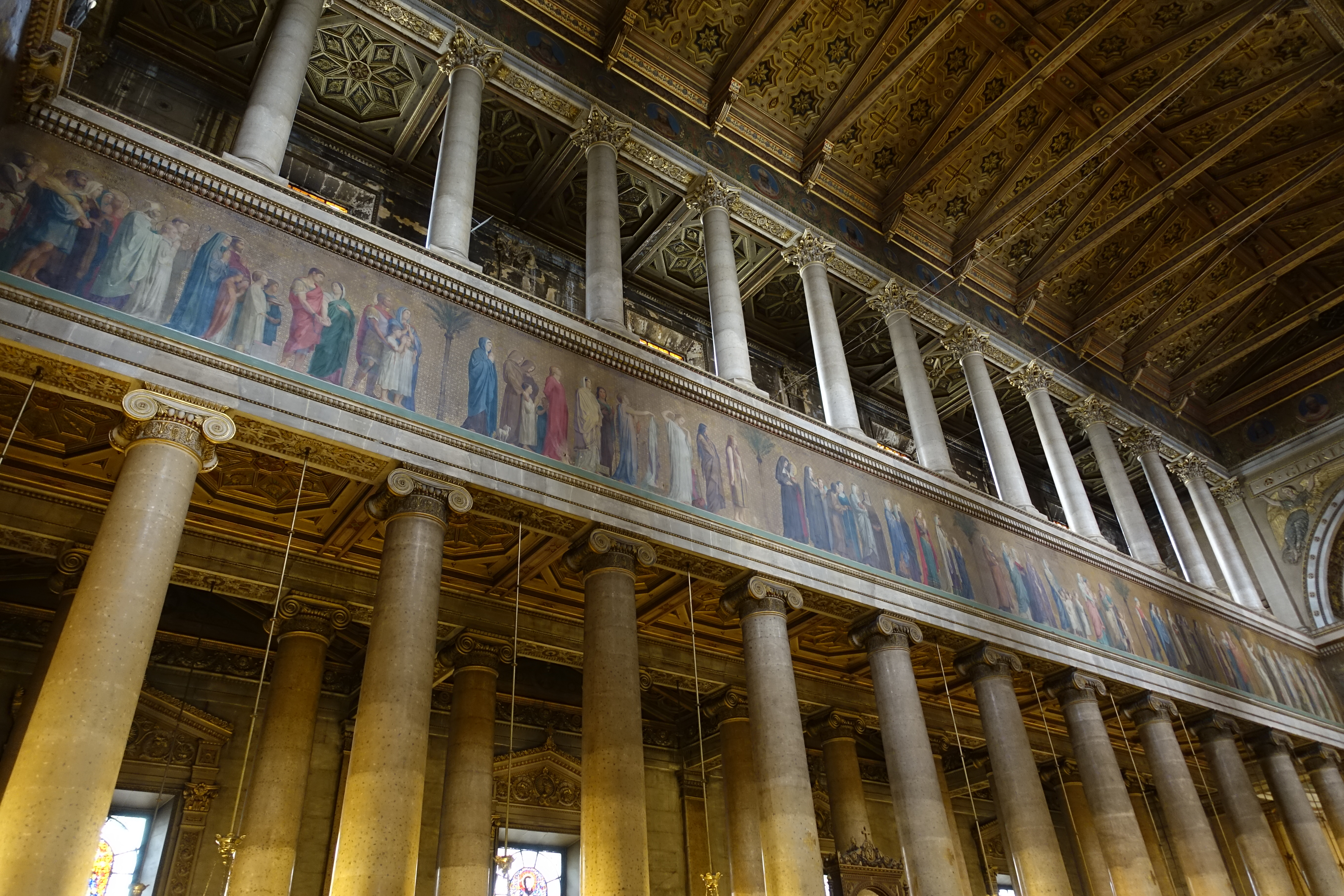
A portion of the frieze "The Mission of the Church", with 235 figures

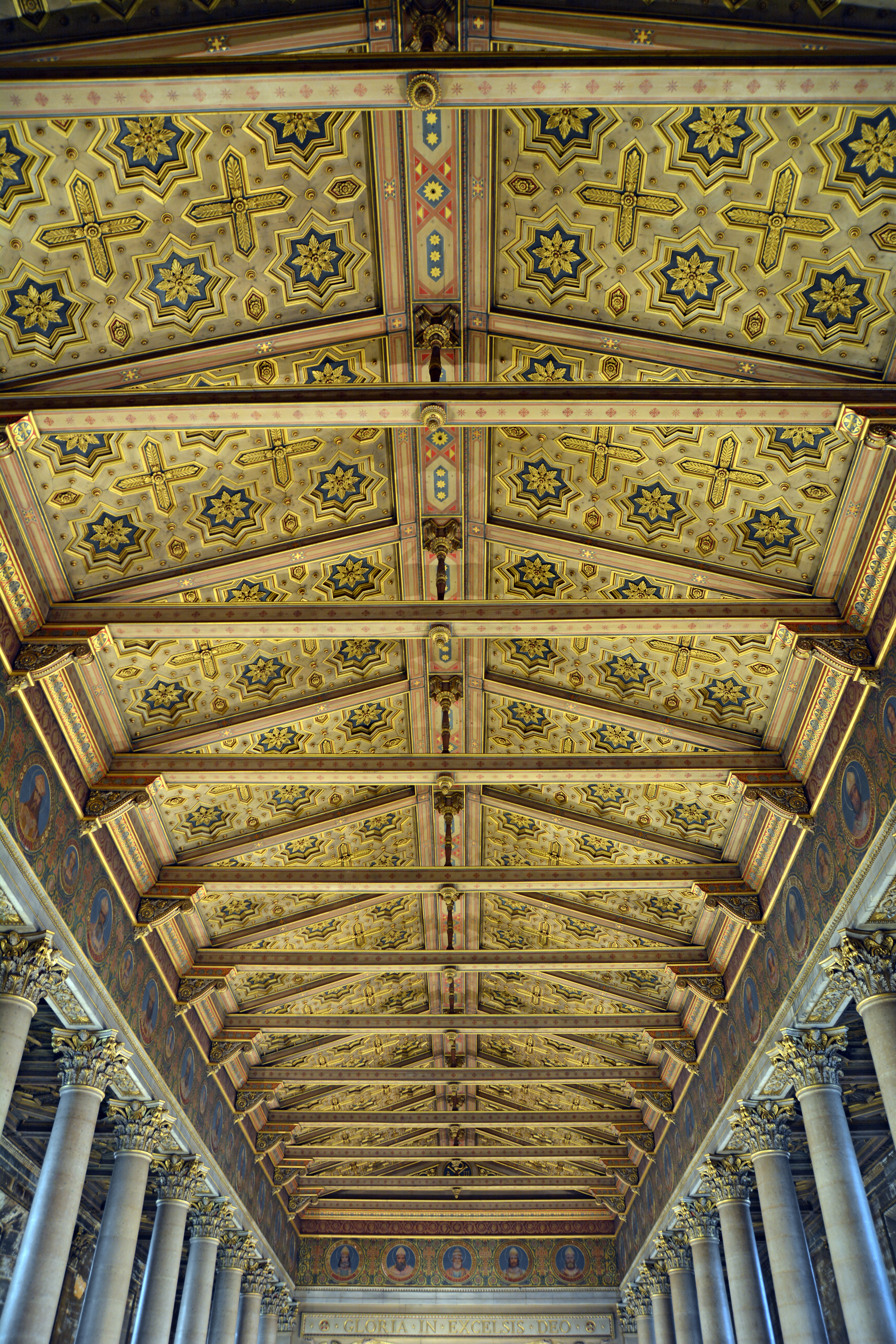
Detail of the ceiling

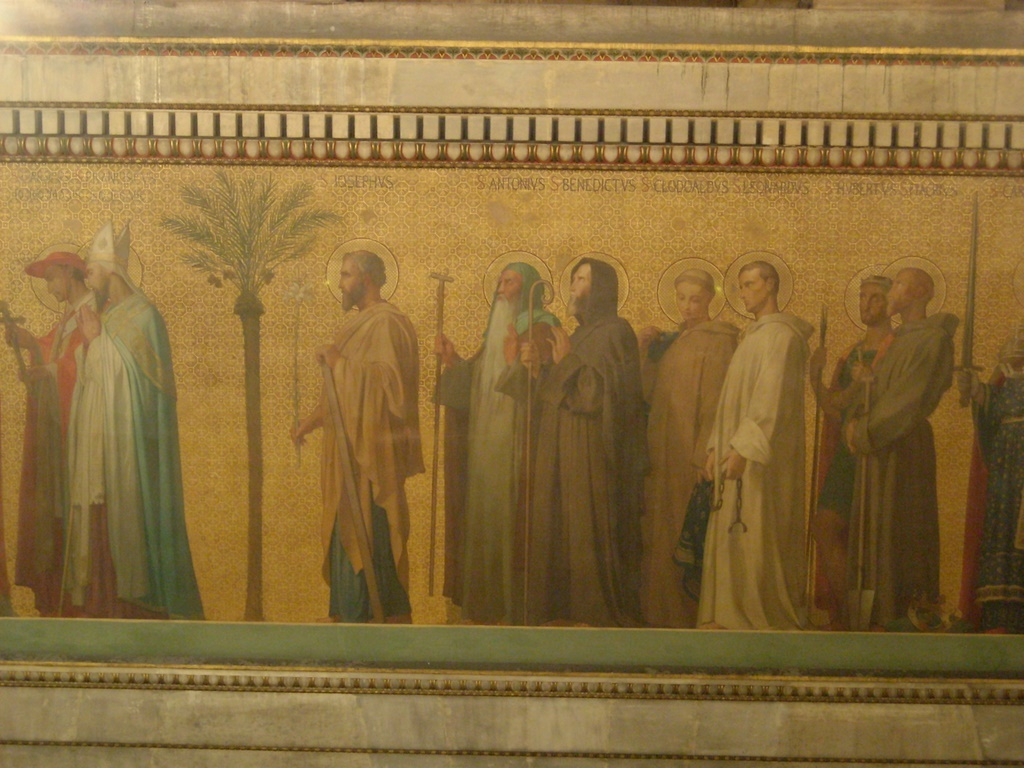
Detail of the frieze by Flandrin

The main altar is covered by a large baldaquin or canopy, in the form of a triumphal arch. Looking down on the altar is a monumental bronze statue of the crucifixion, made by François Rude; below the figure of Christ on either side are large expressive figures of the Virgin and Saint John.

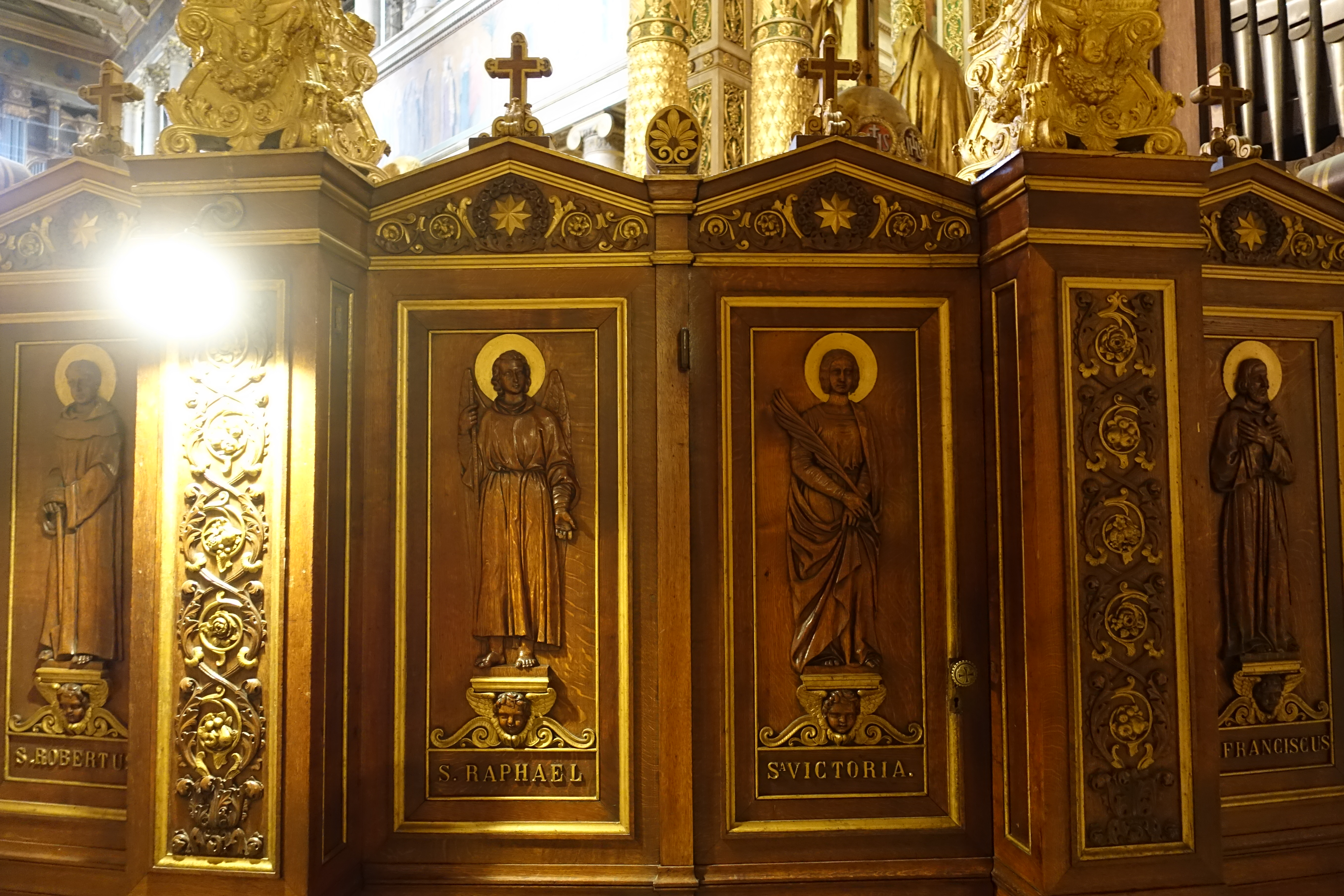
Panels of the Choir

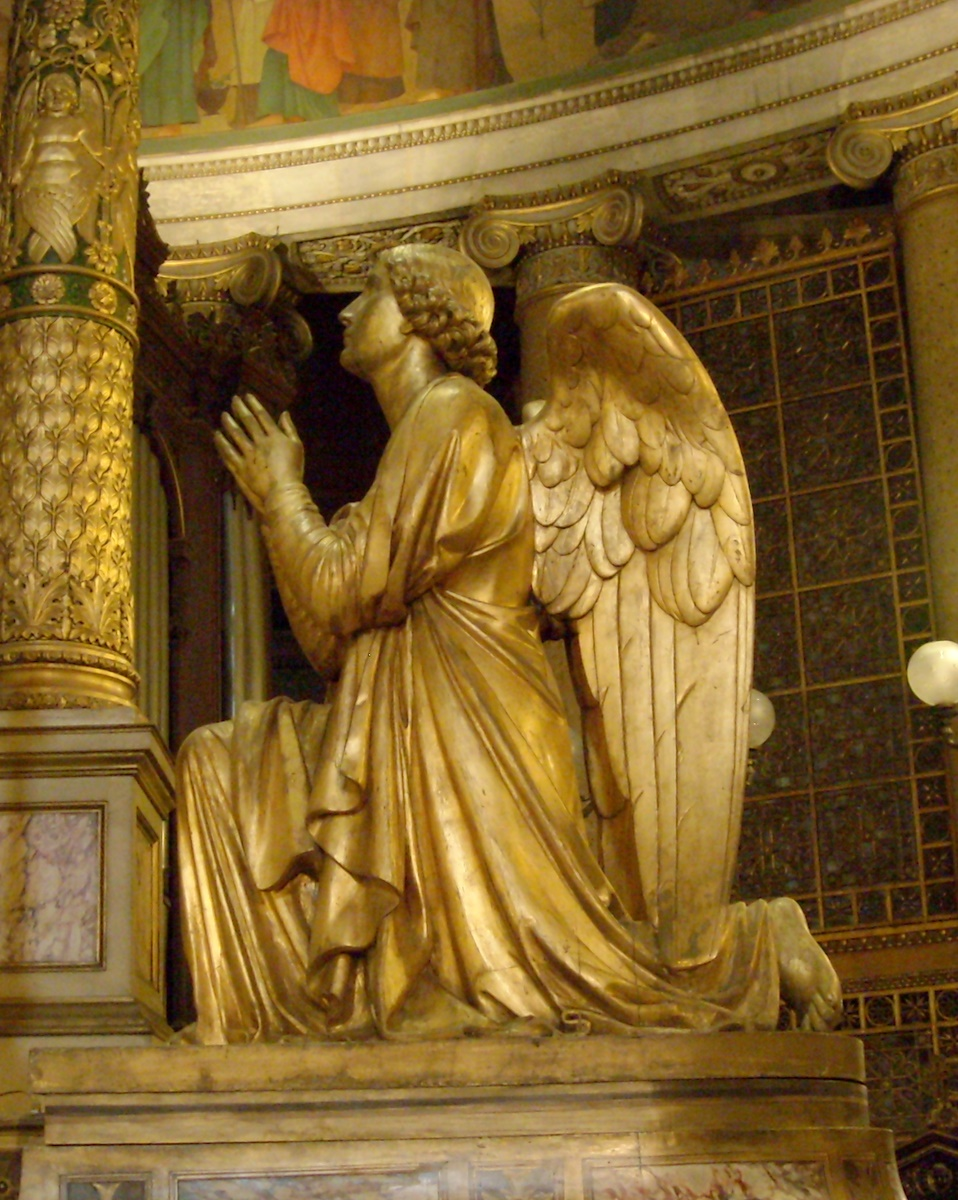
An angel of the main altar

== Stained glass ==
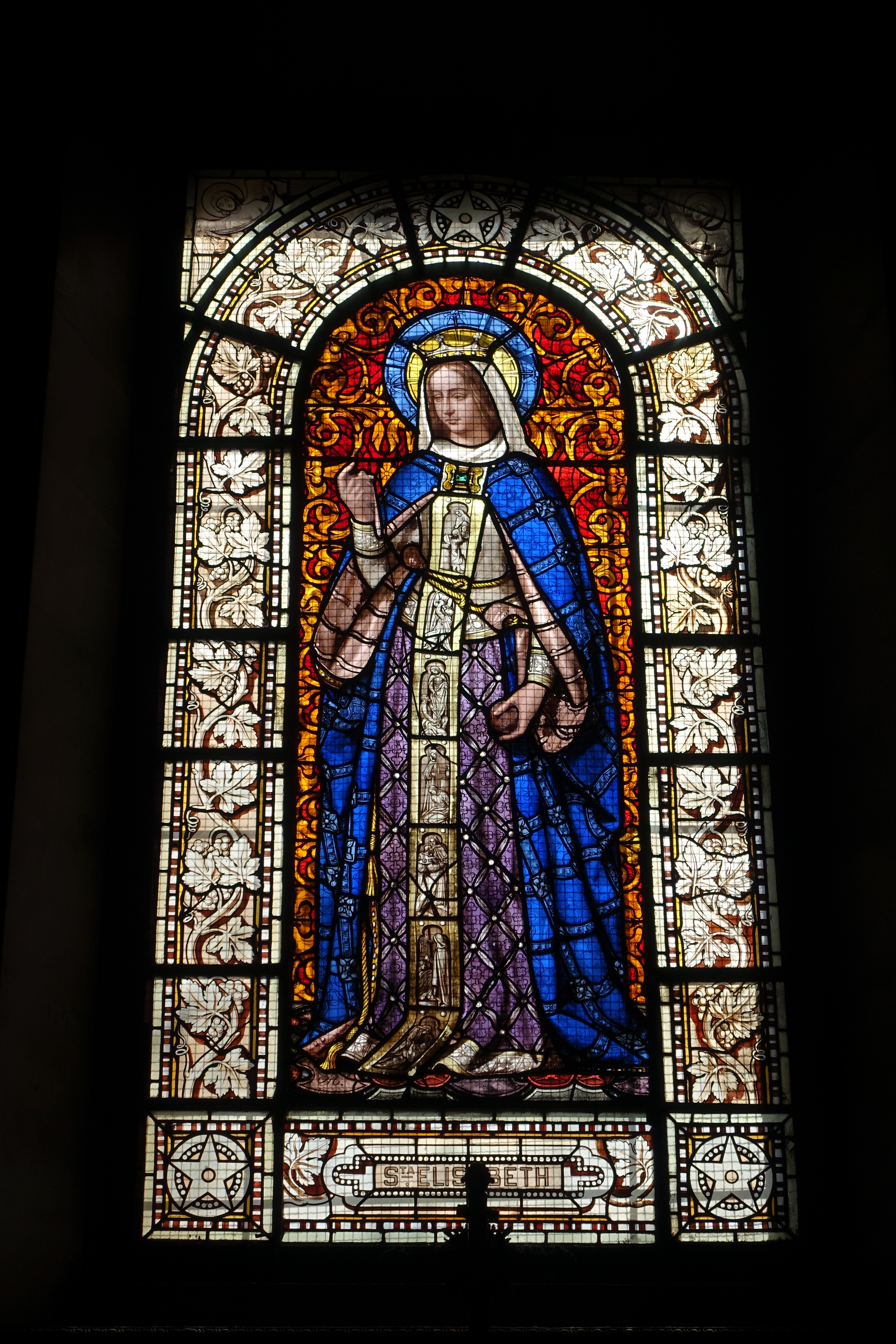
Saint Elizabeth Window

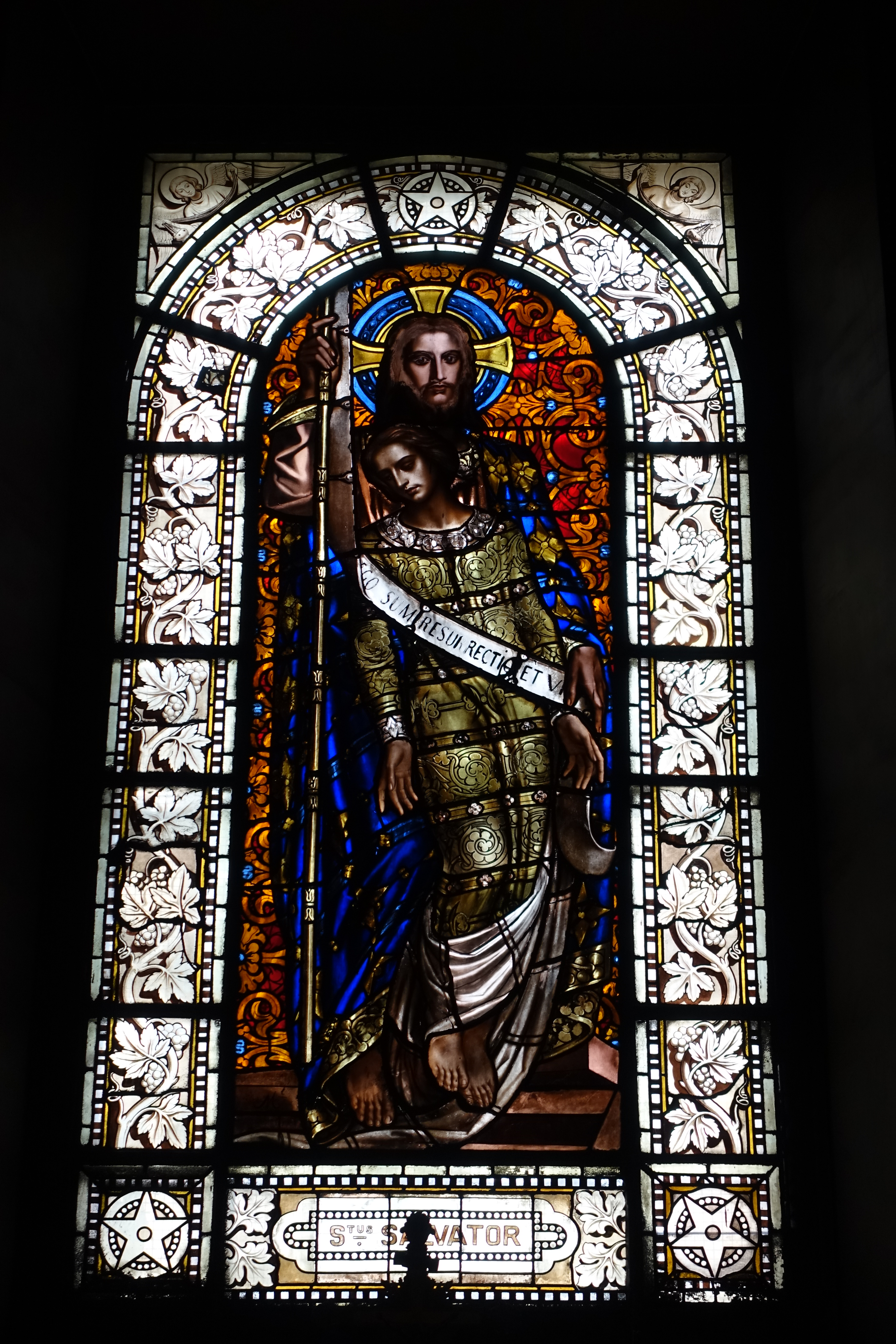
Holy Saviour Window

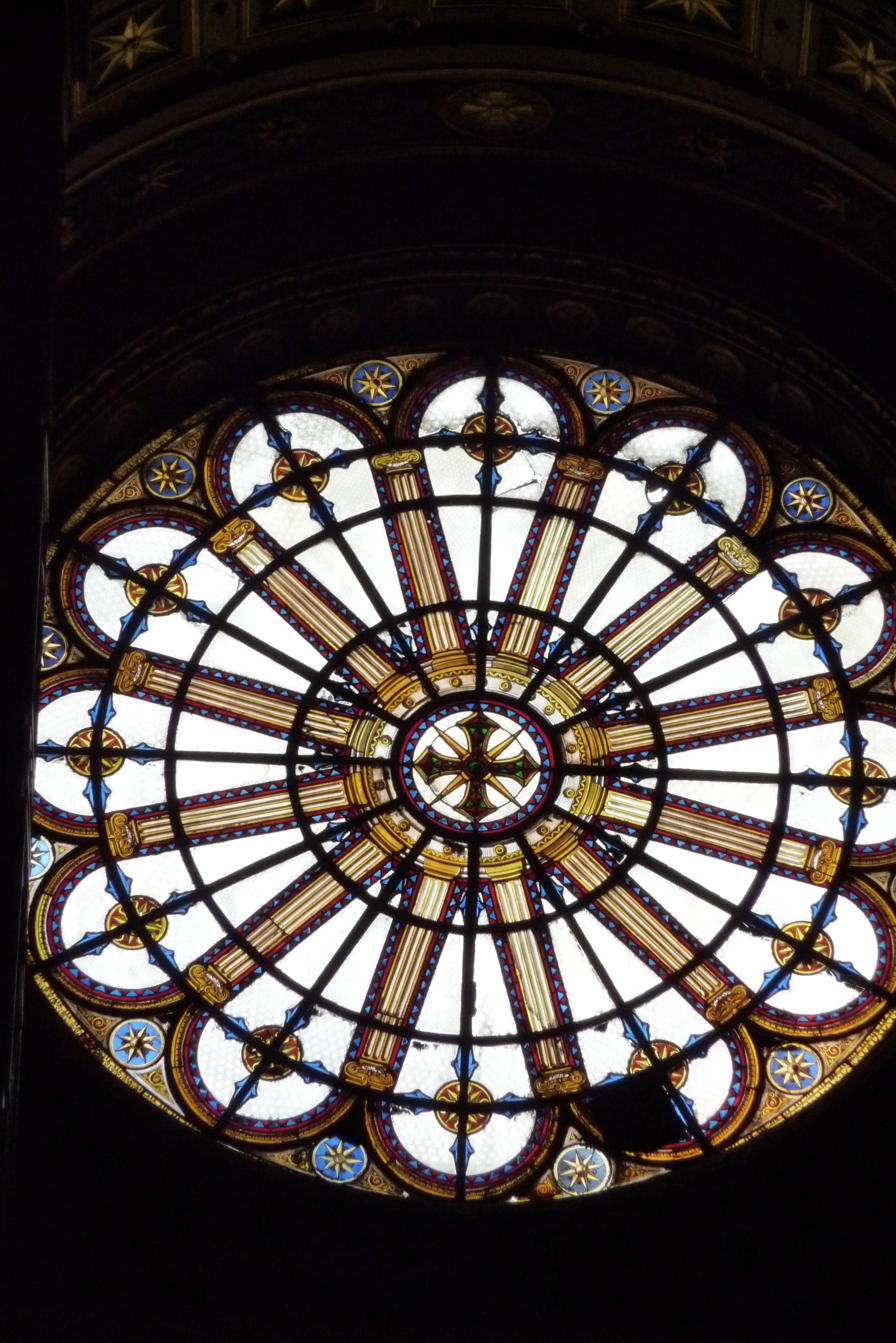
Neoclassical rose window

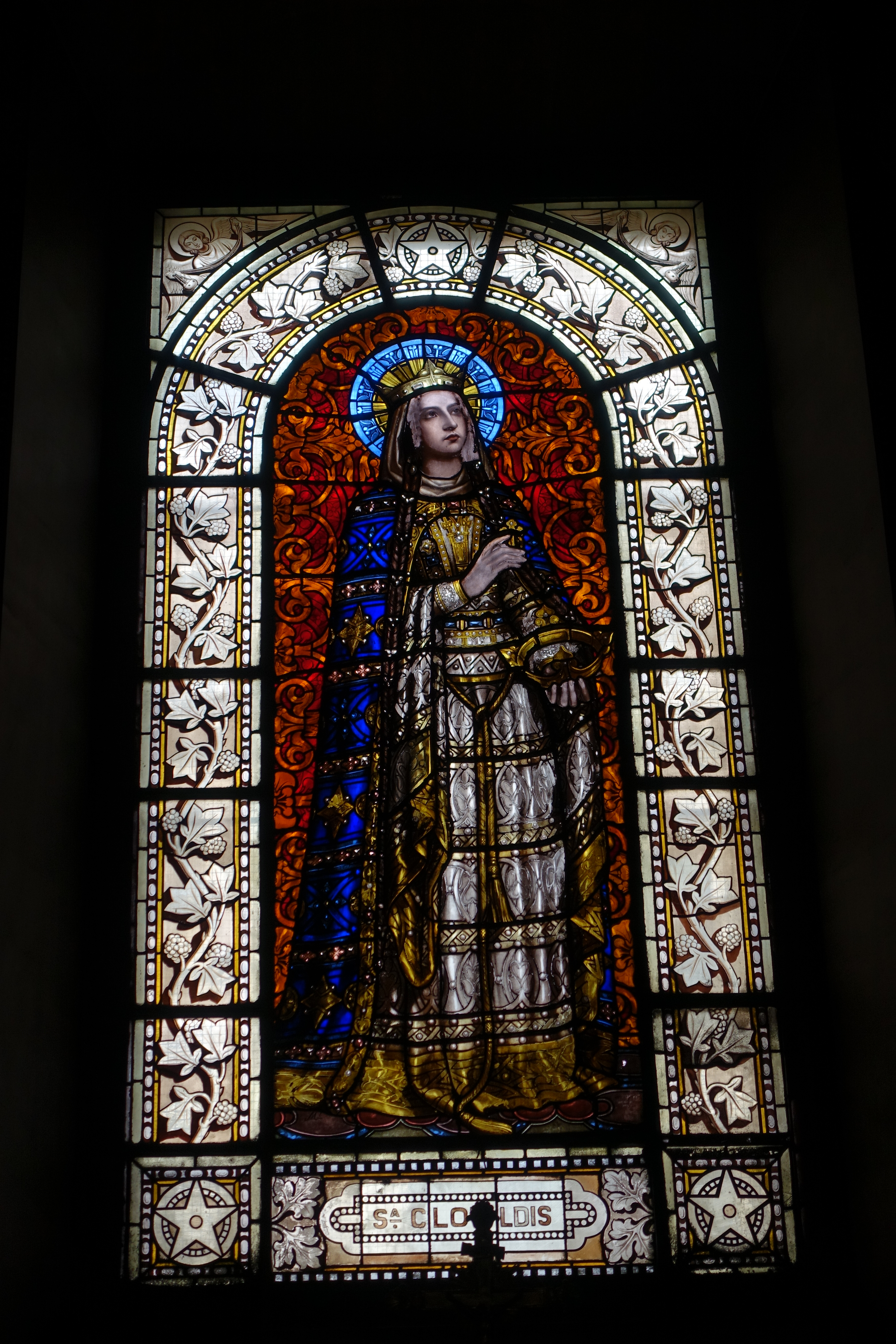
Saimt Clotilde Window

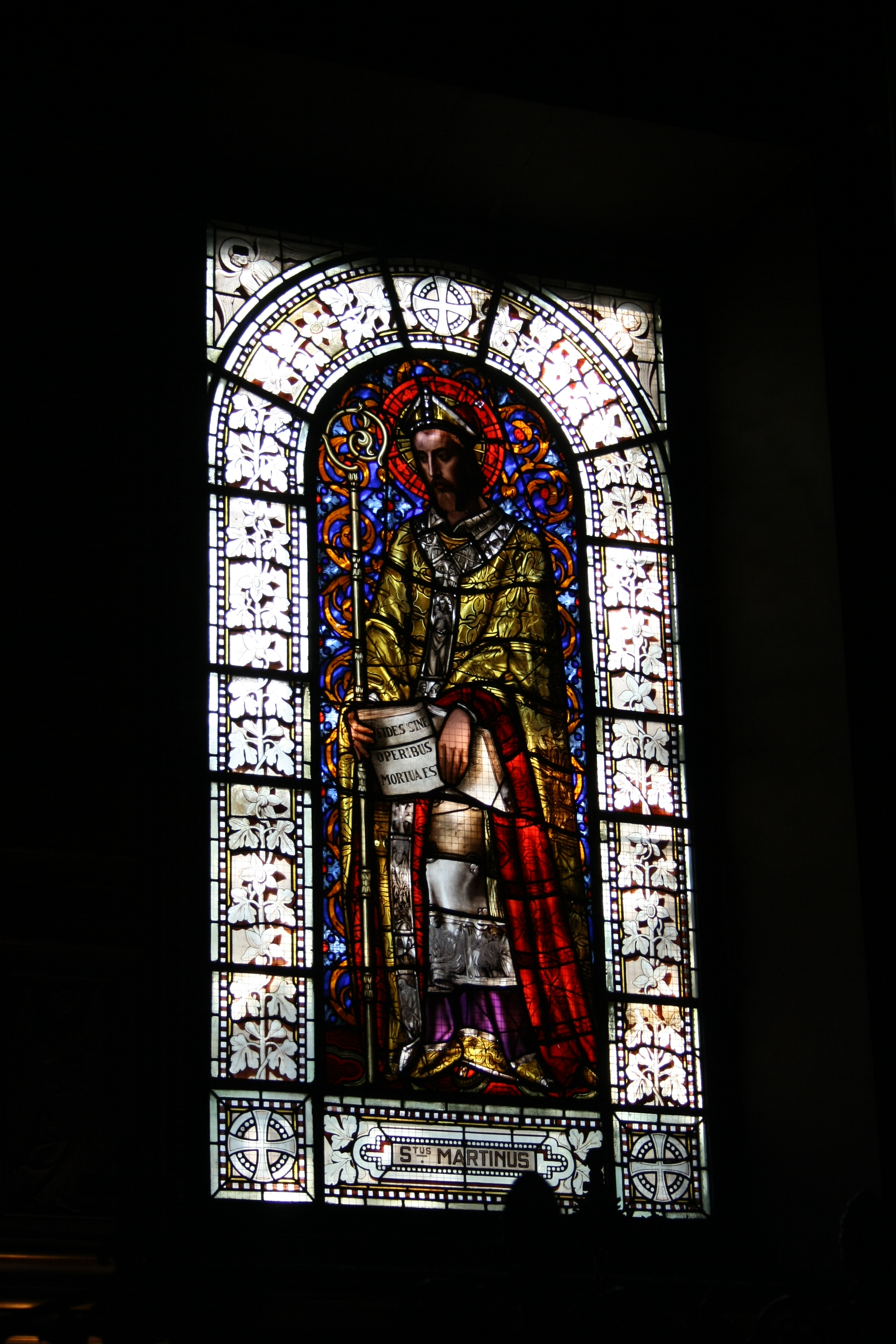
Saint Martin Window

The stained glass windows were made by Charles-Laurent Maréchal and Gugnonin in the 19th century. Unlike Medieval windows, the details of the figures are painted with enamel colors and then baked onto the glass, allowing shading and the realism of paintings.

== Organ ==
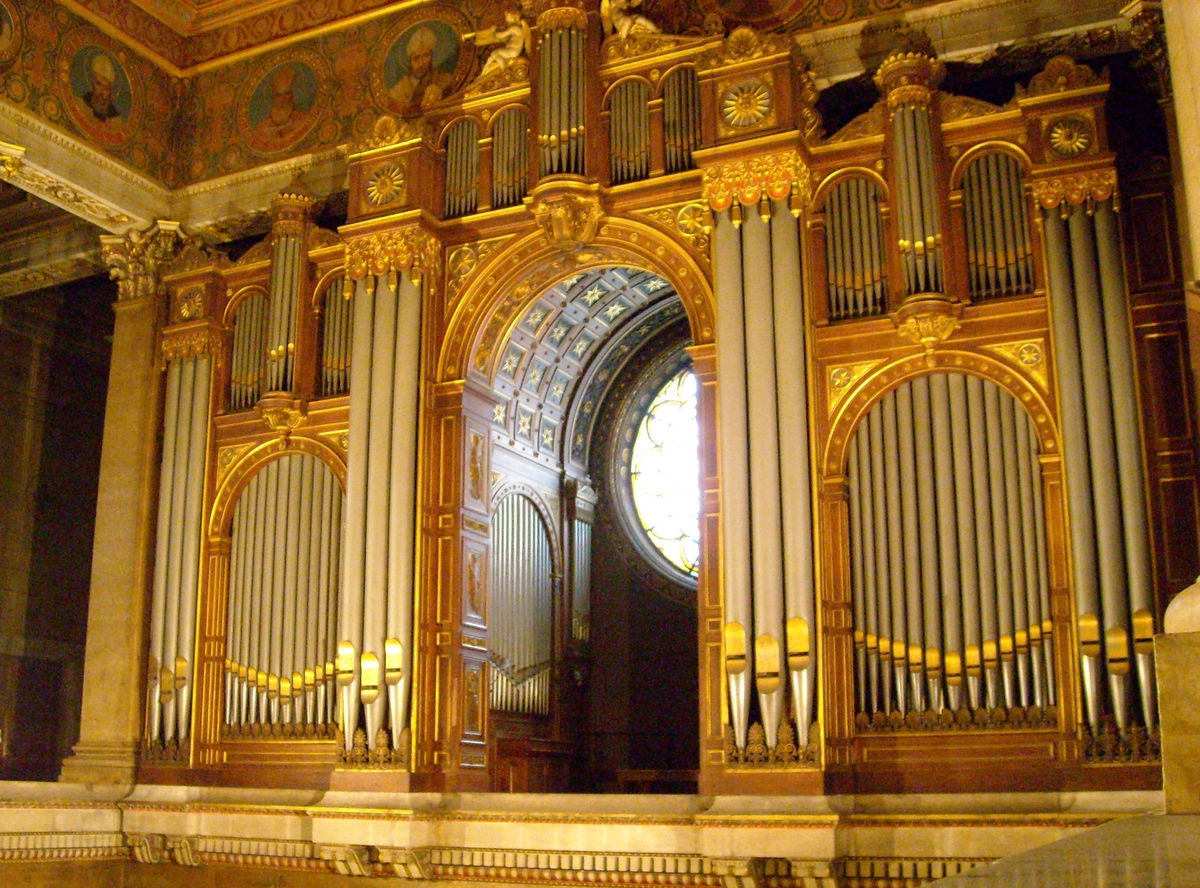
The great organ

The church has two organs: a great organ and an orgue du choeur. The church's titular organists have included Louis Braille, better known for the Braille tactile writing system for the blind, Léon Boëllmann (1881–1897), Henri O'Kelly (1900–1918), and Jean Costa. The current organist is Pierre Cambourian.

The church's great organ, restored and enlarged by Danion-Gonzales in 1970, is made up of:

- 4 manual and pedal keyboards
- 66 stops
- 4,949 pipes
- Electric operation of the keyboards and stops

It was made in 1852 by the renowned organ builder Aristide Cavaillé-Coll, after whom the square behind the church is named. Originally it was only made up of 47 stops over 3 keyboards and 2,669 pipes.

== See also ==
- List of historic churches in Paris

== Bibliography (in French) ==
- Dumoulin, Aline; Ardisson, Alexandra; Maingard, Jérôme; Antonello, Murielle; Églises de Paris (2010), Éditions Massin, Issy-Les-Moulineaux, ISBN 978-2-7072-0683-1
