= Bonaventura Somma =

Italian composer

Bonaventura Somma ( Chianciano Terme 30 July 1893 – Rome 23 October 1960) was an Italian Romantic composer, conductor and organist.

== Life ==
Bonaventura Somma was born in Chianciano Terme - small town located in the province of Siena, on July 30, 1893. As a young man he attended the conservatory in Rome, where he was trained in music, having been a student of various modern composers including Ottorino Respighi.

After finishing his studies, he became a professor for many years at the Conservatory of Santa Cecilia in Rome and directed the Choirs of the "Augusteo" for several years. Always in Rome, he founded the Polyphonic Choir of the Accademia di Santa Cecilia, in which he was permanent director until end of his life. He also worked with the most important conductors and composers of his time (Karajan, Toscanini, Perosi, etc.).

For many years he was director of the Musical Chapel of San Luigi dei Francesi.

== Choirs ==
- Requiem Mass
- Pentecost
- Hail Mary
- Symphony and Variations

== Revisions and transcripts ==
Somma carried out an intense activity of transcription and revision of XVI to XVII century scores for choir, including several Palestrina's Masses and Madrigal works by Banchieri stand out.

== Bibliography ==
- "SOMMA, Bonaventure", in the Italian Encyclopedia - III Appendix, Rome, Institute of the Italian Encyclopedia, 1961.

Somma studied at Conservatorio di Santa Cecilia in Rome con R. Renzi, C. Dobici, S. Falchi e Ottorino Respighi. He was Mestro at Shrine of the Virgin of the Rosary of Pompei (1911), organist at the Waldensian Evangelical Church of Rome and for many years Maestro of San Luigi dei Francesi.

== Compositions ==
- Missa in honorem Sanctae Ritae e Cassia binis vocibus paribus organo vel harmonio comitante, 1938
- Missa in honorem Beatae Mariae Virginis sub titulo "Salus infirmorum" ad chorum duarum, trium et quatuor vocum virilium cun organo vel harmonio
- Missa pro defunctis tribus vocibus inaequalibus organo comitante concinenda, 1939
- Missa in honorem Sanctae Clarae Assisiensis, ad chorum duarum, trium et quattuor vocum aequalium cum organo vel harmonio, 1954
- Ave Maria, per coro a 4 voci virili con accompagnamento d'organo o d'armonio
- Beatus vir, Salmo solenne per coro a tre voci virili con organo od armonio
- Canti eucaristici: Adoro te devote. Tantum ergo. O salutaris hostia. Per coro ad una voce Media con organo od armonio, 1937
- Ego sum panis vivus. Motectum unius vocis mediae organo vel harmonio comitante
- Flos carmeli. Mottetto Mariano per coro a due voci eguali con organo od armonio
- Gaudeamus. Introito-mottetto per coro a due voci eguali con organo od armonio
- Nenia. Pastorale. A tre voci miste (C. T. Br. ) con accompagnamento d'organo od armonio
- Nenia pastorale a 5 voci dispari senza accompagnamento
- Nenia pastorale, a due voci pari, con accompagnamento d'organo o d'armonio
- O salutaris hostia, motectum ad chorum quinque vocum inaequalium
- Pater noster. Coro accademico a due voci eguali con pianoforte
- Storia d'amore (racconto d'inverno), per violino e pianoforte
- Stornelli delle Stagioni, per canto e piano
- 2 canti per bambini : a 4 voci pari
- 3 canti per bambini : a 4 voci pari
- Flores apparuerunt : motectum
- Due canti eucaristici : per coro a 2 voci eguali con organo od armonio
- Leggenda pastorale
- Il codino traditore : Scherzo a tre voci bianche
- La neve : Corettino ad una voce Media con accompagnamento di pianoforte.
- Burlesca, per orchestrina
- Canzone per organo
- Leggenda pastorale per organo
- Suite francescana per organo
- Dirigatur, domine, oratio mea, sicut incensum in conspectu tuo. Momenti spirituali per organo od armonio
- Toccata per organo

== Sources ==
- Biography at Carrara Editions
- «SOMMA, Bonaventura», in Enciclopedia Italiana - III Appendice, Roma, Istituto dell'Enciclopedia Italiana, 1961.
