= Vicente Spiteri =

Spanish conductor

Vicente Spiteri (11 December 1917 – 8 November 2003) was a Spanish conductor.
