= The Opera Quarterly =

- Discipline: Music
- Language: English
- Edited by: Christopher Morris Maynooth University and Emanuele Senici Università di Roma La Sapienza

Publication details
- Publisher: Oxford University Press (United Kingdom)
- Frequency: quarterly

Standard abbreviations
- ISO 4: Opera Q.

Indexing
- ISSN: 0736-0053 (print); 1476-2870 (web)

Links
- Journal homepage

The Opera Quarterly is a peer-reviewed academic journal of opera, founded in 1983. It is published by Oxford University Press.

The executive editors are Christopher Morris of Maynooth University and Emanuele Senici of Università di Roma La Sapienza.
