= Videgain =

Videgain is a surname. It is of Basque origin language with the form Bidegain. Videgain is considered a Spanish surname because the letter V does not exist in the Basque alphabet. It extended through the Iberian peninsula following the Reconquista, where different forms of the name developed and houses were founded with the differentiation of Videgáin, Bidegain, Videgaín. Spelling errors were added over time in some branches of the name, forming corruptions such as Videgaray, Vidagain, and Vidigain.

== Artists ==
- Antonia García de Videgain (1850–1924), Spanish singer, dancer and actress
- Antonio Videgain (1869–1944), Spanish conductor and composer
- Antonio Videgain Reparaz (1892–1945), Spanish editor and singer of lírics (ópera and Zarzuela)
- Juan José Videgain (born 1975), Spanish writer, editor, producer, actor and director
- Salvador Videgain (1886–1957), Spanish actor, businessman, director and singer comedian
- Salvador Videgain Gómez (1845–1906), Spanish actor, singer, producer and composer

== Others ==
- Fermín Videgain (1856–1920), medical inspector.
- José María Romera Videgain (1980-) champion runner.
- Charles Videgain (1947-), philologist.
- Sabino Videgain, (1891–1959) colonel and investigating judge.
- Salvador Tejada Videgain Paint of theathre.
- Luis Videgain Mayor of Marine.
- Alejandro Landa Videgain General.

== See also ==
- Thomas Bidegain
