= Cementerio de la Almudena =

Cemetery in Madrid, Spain

Coordinates: 40°25′10″N 3°38′26″W

Cementerio de Nuestra Señora de La Almudena
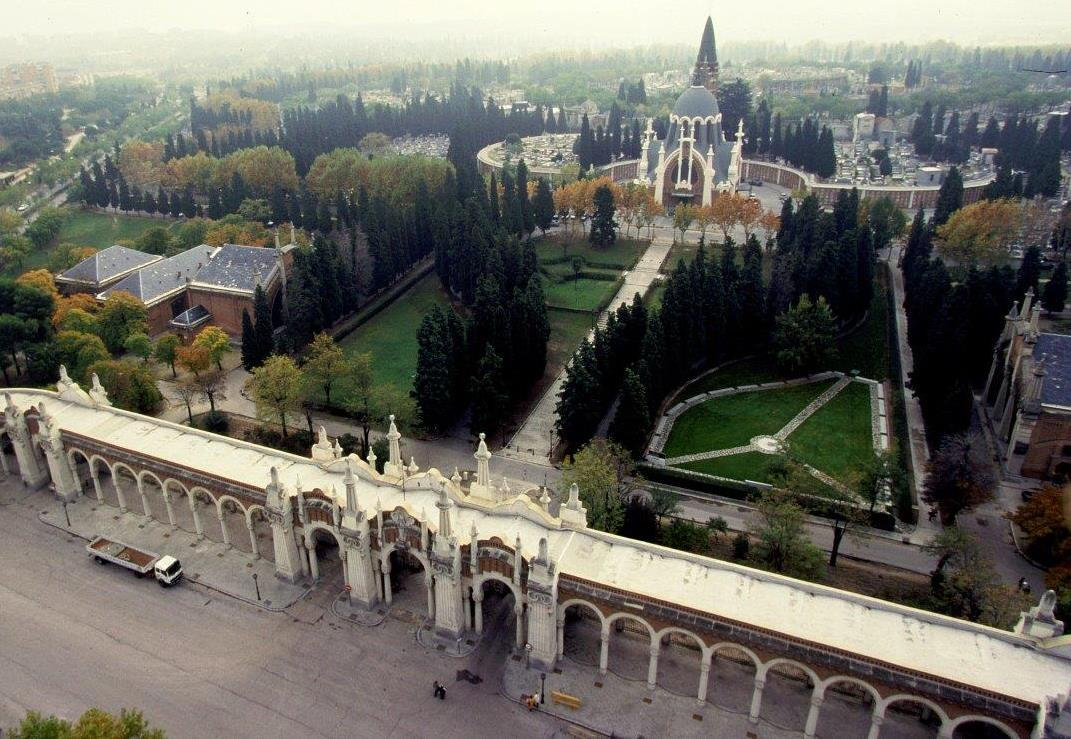
- Northern gate of the cemetery
- Interactive map of Cementerio de Nuestra Señora de La Almudena

Details
- Established: 1884
- Location: Madrid
- Country: Spain
- Type: Public
- No. of graves: 5 million

The Cementerio de Nuestra Señora de La Almudena (English: Our Lady of Almudena Cemetery), former Necrópolis del Este (East cemetery) is a cemetery in Madrid, Spain. It is the largest in Western Europe. The number of bodies buried is estimated at five million since it was the main cemetery for the entire city from 1884 to 1973, and from the 1920s was almost the only one for the majority of its former population. A crematorium, the first in Spain, was opened at the cemetery in 1973.

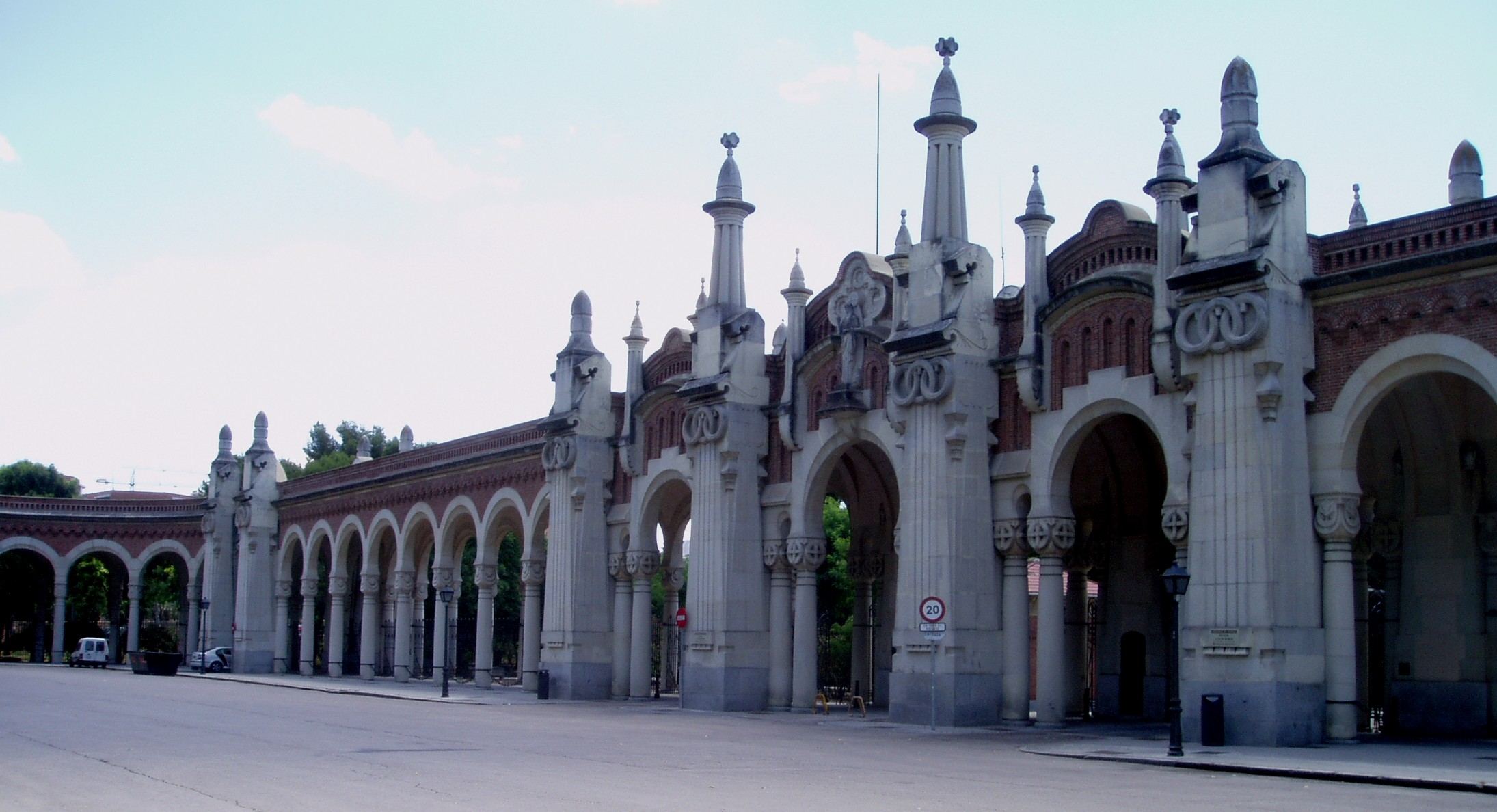
View of the cemetery buildings.

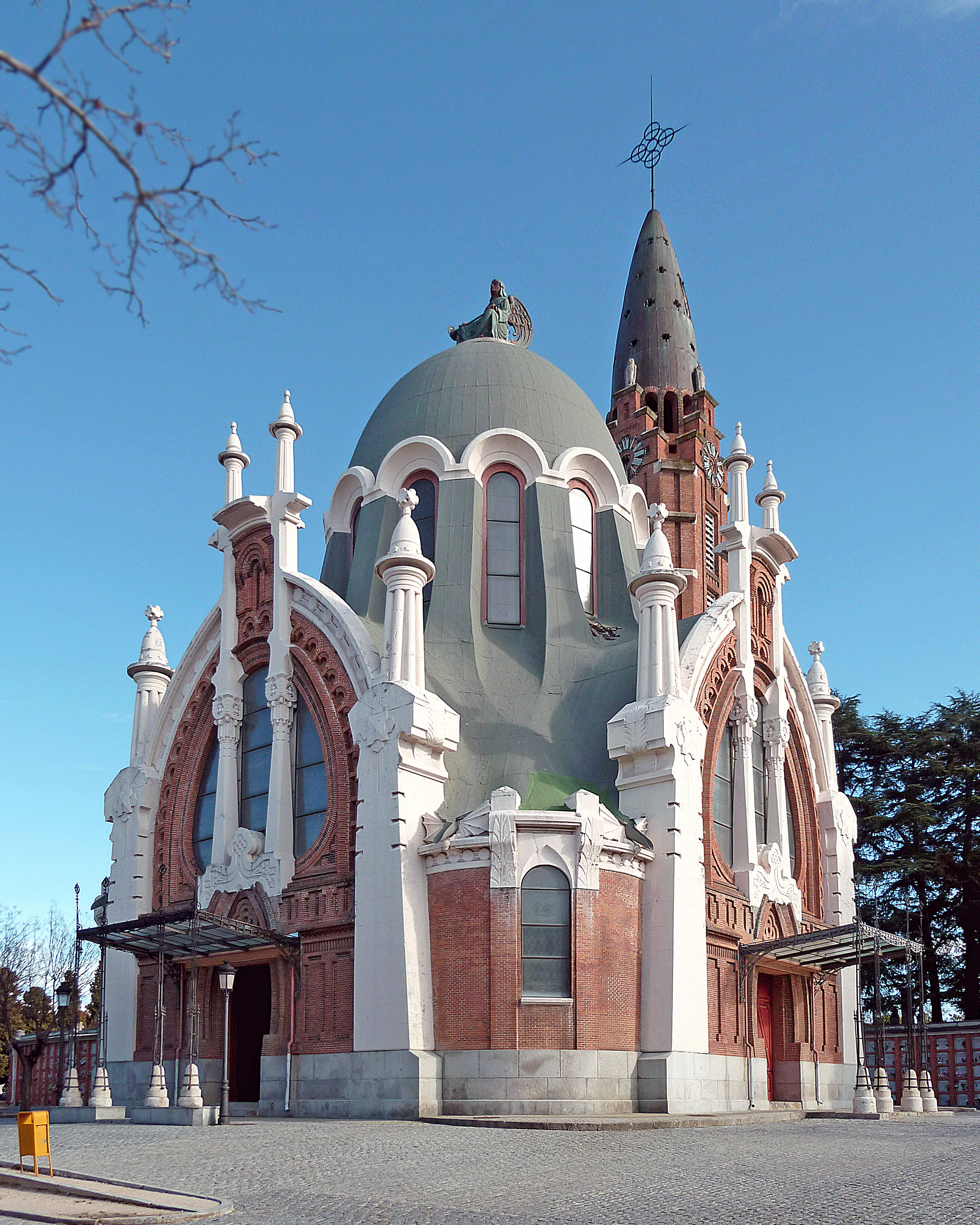
Chapel.

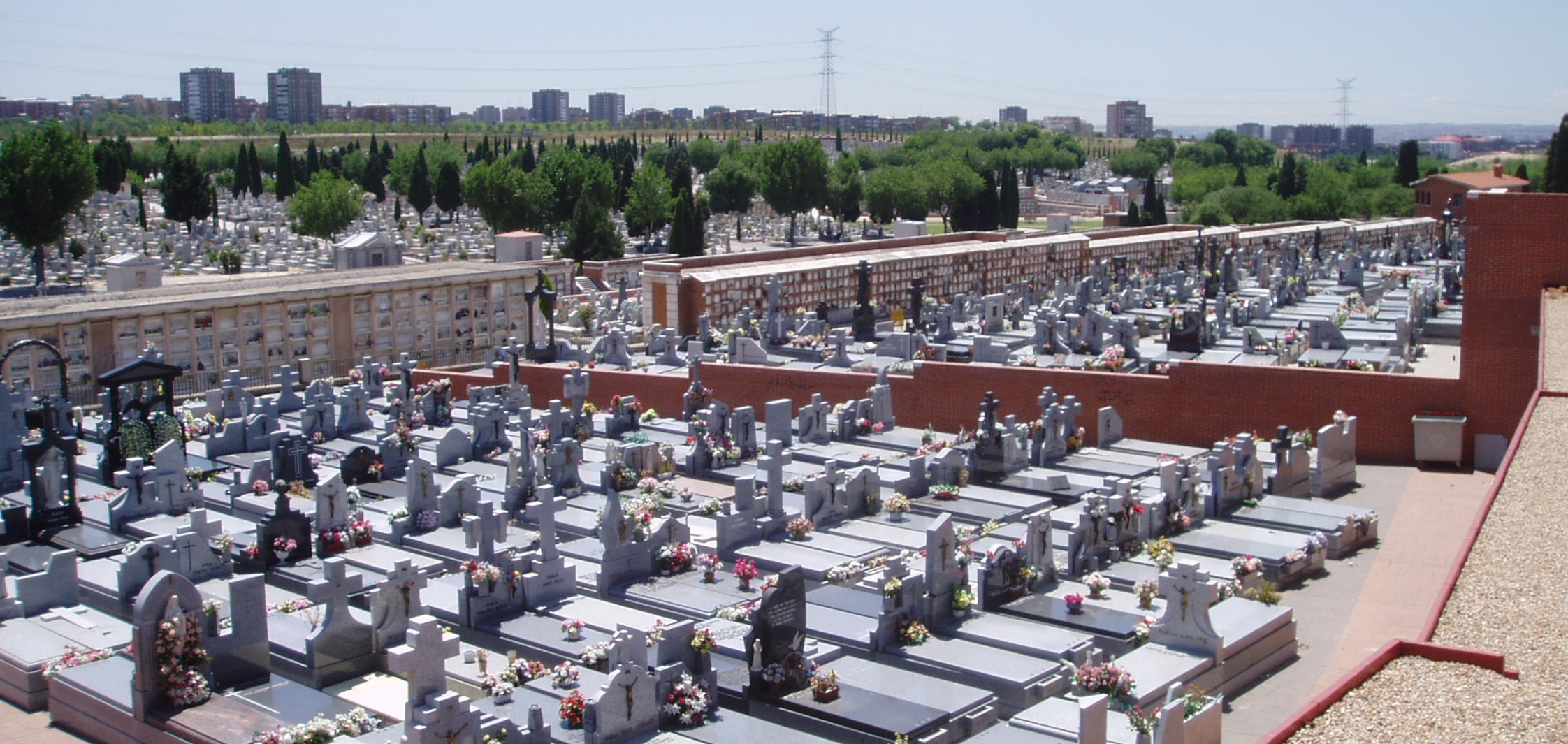
Graves in the cemetery

== Notable burials ==
- Niceto Alcalá-Zamora (1877–1949), president of the Second Spanish Republic
- Vicente Aleixandre (1898–1984), poet, Nobel laureate
- Dámaso Alonso (1898–1990), writer
- Francisco Alonso (1890–1948), composer
- José María Alvira (1864–1938), composer
- Ángel de Andrés (1918–2006), actor and theatre director
- José Millán-Astray (1879-1954), founder and first commander of the Spanish Legion
- Luis Barbero (1916–2005), actor
- Pío Baroja (1872–1956), Spanish writer
- José Bódalo (1916–1985), actor
- Julia Caba Alba (1902–1988), actress
- José María Caffarel (1919–1999), actor
- Estrellita Castro (1914–1983), singer, actress
- Evangelina Sobredo Galanes (1948–1976), singer
- La Chelito (1885–1959), Cuban-born Spanish cuplé singer
- José Cubero Sánchez (1964–1985), French-born Spanish bullfighter
- Marujita Díaz (1932–2015), singer and actress
- Alfredo Di Stéfano (1926–2014), Real Madrid player
- Antonio Flores (1961–1995), rock musician
- Lola Flores (1923–1995), famous gypsy singer, dancer and actress
- Antonia García de Videgain (1850–1924) actress and international singer.
- Jean Laurent (1816–1886)
- Laureano López Rodó (1920–2000), Minister of Foreign Affairs during the rule of Francisco Franco.
- Julián Marías (1914–2005), philosopher
- Carlos Marín Menchero (1968–2021), singer and producer
- Alfredo Mayo (1911–1985), actor
- Antonio Molina (1928–1992), actor
- Matilde Muñoz Sampedro (1906–1969) actress
- Juan Carlos Onetti (1909–1994), Uruguayan author
- Luis Peña (1918–1977), actor
- Benito Pérez Galdós (1843–1920), Spanish writer
- Ángel Picazo (1917–1998), actor
- Emiliano Piedra (1931–1991), film producer
- Mercedes Prendes (1908–1981), actress
- Santiago Ramón y Cajal (1852–1934), scientist, Nobel prize winner sometimes considered the father of modern neuroscience
- Olga Ramos (1918–2005), singer
- Efrén Rebolledo (1877–1929), Mexican poet and diplomat
- Aurora Redondo (1900–1996), actress
- Fernando Rey (1917–1994), actor
- Federico Romero (1886–1976), poet and librettist
- Carmen Sánchez (1898–1985), actress, producer and singer.
- Enrique Urquijo (1960–1999), singer
- Salvador Videgain (1886–1947), actor, director, author and producer of theatre.
- Frank Yerby (1916–1991), African-American novelist
