= La verbena de la Paloma =

1894 zarzuela

- Zarzuela by Tomás Bretón
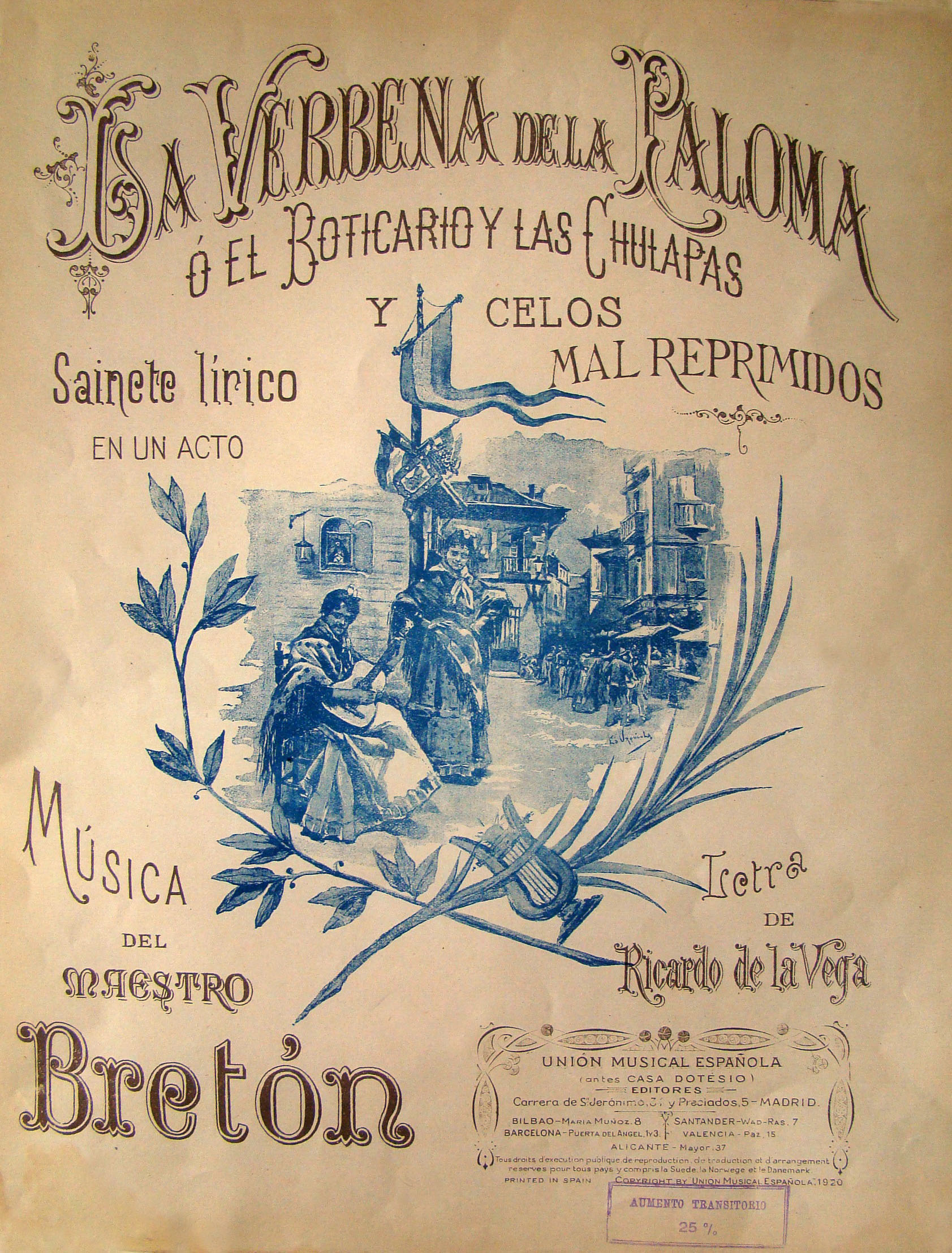
- Libretto front cover c. 1920 showing the artwork for the libretto and poster of the 1894 premiere
- Librettist: Ricardo de la Vega
- Language: Spanish
- Premiere: 17 February 1894; Teatro Apolo, Madrid

La verbena de la Paloma (The Fair of the Virgin of la Paloma) —subtitled El boticario y las chulapas y celos mal reprimidos— is an 1894 zarzuela with a libretto by Ricardo de la Vega and music by Tomás Bretón. It premiered on 17 February 1894 in Teatro Apolo, Madrid. It was later adapted for the cinema in 1921 by José Buchs, in 1935 as Paloma Fair by Benito Perojo and in 1963 as The Fair of the Dove by José Luis Sáenz de Heredia.

The work premiered with the cast including Emilio Mesejo (Julián), Luisa Campos (Susana), Leocadia Alba (Señá Rita), Don José Mesejo (tabernero), Manolo Rodríguez (Don Hilarión) and Irene Alba (Casta). The cast was more of actors than singers. The zarzuela's great success for the authors led quickly to a debut in South America where it premiered the same year in Buenos Aires, with a cast including Rogelio Juárez (Don Hilarión), Eliseo San Juan (Julián), Clotilde Perales (Susana), Carmen Ciudad (Casta), Antonia García de Videgain (Señá Rita), Salvador Videgain (Tabernero) and Isabel López (Tía Antonia). The ambassador of Spain in Argentina recalled all the artistic staff at the premieres in the capital of Buenos Aires in 1894, confirming that La Verbena premiered three months apart in three theaters, the most popular version being the first one in which that took part the Videgain family.

== Roles ==
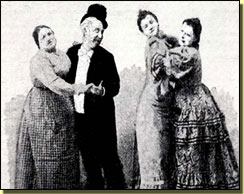
Image from the 1894 premiere

- Don Hilarión, elderly apothecary who enjoys the company of Susana and Casta; singing actor
- Don Sebastián, Don Hilarión's friend; singing actor
- Tabernero, tavern keeper; baritone
- Julián, jealously in love with Susana, a typesetter (cajista de imprenta) by occupation; tenor or baritone
- Señá Rita, wife of the tabernero and Julián's godmother; mezzo-soprano or contralto
- Susana, Julián's love interest; soprano
- Casta, Susana's sister; soprano
- Tía Antonia, aunt of Susana and Casta, and a gossiper; contralto
- Guardia primero, policeman walking his beat; bass or baritone
- Guardia segundo, accompanying policeman; baritone
- La cantadora, flamenco singer in a café; mezzo-soprano

== Synopsis ==
The zarzuela occurs in Madrid on the night of August 14 during the festival of the Virgin of La Paloma (La verbena de la paloma).

Scene 1 takes place in a square in front of a tavern where people are having separate conversations. Don Hilarión and Don Sebastián discuss the consumption of various products (El aceite de ricino ya no es malo de tomar.). The Tabernero is playing cards with two friends. A man and a woman holding a baby comment on the heat and the baby sleeping. Julián is complaining to Señá Rita that he saw Susanna in a coach and felt she was with a man even though Susanna told him later she was with her sister. After Don Sebastián leaves, Don Hilarión thinks about his planned romantic encounter with Susana and Casta (Tiene razón don Sebastián).

Scene 2 takes place on a street in the barrio de la Latina. A crowd including Susana, Casta and Tía Antonia, has gathered around to hear a flamenco singer sing En Chiclana me crié. Tía Antonia interrupts the singer praising her performance; Susana and Casta try to calm her down. Members of the crowd comment favourably about the performance.

After the singing, Susana tells Tía Antonia and Casta of her falling out with Julián. Don Hilarión meets the women and they enter a café together. Before entering the café, the Tabernero tells friends that Julián wants to confront Susana over their break up. Next Julián and Señá Rita arrive outside the café where Señá Rita asks Julián what he intends to do (Ya estás frente a la casa. ¿Y ahora qué vas a hacer?). Julián sees Don Hilarión leaving with Susana, Casta and Tía Antonia, and greets him. He then asks Susana where she is going in fancy clothing (¿Dónde vas con mantón de Manila? ¿Dónde vas con vestido chiné?). Susana gives him a mocking reply which inflames his jealousy. Julián then tries to attack Don Hilarión. The Tabernero and others exit the café to stop the altercation. The crowd disperses after two policemen arrive. Julián tries to pursue Don Hilarión and Susana.

Scene 3 occurs in a street in the city centre where couples are dancing. Don Sebastián is enjoying the evening with friends and family, and greets Don Hilarión when he arrives. The latter goes inside because of the cold; he is shaken from his prior encounter with Julián. Julián arrives looking for Don Hilarión and Susana, and briefly mistakes another couple for them. He then has an altercation with Tía Antonia who is with her nieces Susana and Casta. An inspector and two policemen appear on scene to question the participants in the disturbance. During questioning, Tía Antonia gets into an argument with the inspector and threatens to attack Julián. Two policemen take her away. When Julián tells the inspector he is willing to go to jail, Susana surprises him by saying she would go with him. Don Sebastián presents himself to the inspector to vouch for Julián's good character. The inspector knows Don Sebastián, so decides to dismiss the matter. However, Julián has found Don Hilarión and chases him onto the street, shocking Don Sebastián and others. Don Sebastián expresses understanding when Julián says Don Hilarión was stealing his girl. The inspector requests that there be no more disturbances that evening. Julián and Susana reconcile. Everyone goes back to celebrating the festival.

== Recordings ==
Soloists: Susana — Julián — Señá Rita — Don Hilarión — La cantaora — Tía Antonia

- (rec. 1929) Rosita Rodrigo, Emili Vendrell, Cora Raga, Anselmo Fernández. Antonio Capdevila — (LP) Odeón; (CD) Blue Moon BMCD 7505
- (rec. 1931) Selica Pérez Carpio, Pepe Romeu, Regina Zaldívar, Eduardo Marcén, Ramona Galindo (Tía Antonia). Orquesta Sinfónica Columbia. Daniel Montorio — (LP) Discos Columbia; (CD, 2001) Blue Moon BMCD 7550
- (1952) Ana María Iriarte, Manuel Ausensi, Toñy Rosado, Carlos Oller, Inés Rivadeneira. Coro Cantores de Madrid. Orquesta de Cámara de Madrid. Ataúlfo Argenta — (LP) Alhambra (Montilla FM-LP-2); (digital) Naxos
- (rec. 1957.IV) Ana María Iriarte, Manuel Ausensi, Inés Rivadeneira, Miguel Ligero Rodríguez, María Dolores López, Selica Pérez Carpio. Coro Cantores de Madrid (dir. José Perera). Gran Orquesta Sinfónica. Ataúlfo Argenta — (LP) Alhambra MCC 30.000; (CD) Alhambra WD-71435
- (rec. 1960s?) Elsa del Campo, Luis Sagi-Vela, Dolores Pérez, Santiago Ramallé, Luisa Castillo, Luisa Espinosa. Orquesta y Coros Montilla. Eugenio Mario Marco — (LP) Montilla FM 168; (CD) Zafiro 50603039
- (rec. 1972.V) Ángeles Chamorro, Alfredo Kraus, Inés Rivadeneira, Antonio Campó, Marisa Moro, Luisa de Córdoba. Coro Cantores de Madrid. Orquesta Manuel de Falla. Enrique García Asensio — (LP) Carillon CAL19; (CD) Tiempo AD-ZK-010/94
- (1978) Teresa Tourné, Renato Cesari, Dolores Ripollés, Antonio Pérez Bayod, Emilia García (Tía Antonia). Coro "Cantadores de Madrid" (dir. José Perera). Orquesta de Conciertos de Madrid. Federico Moreno Torroba — (LP) HispaVox S 20.146; (CD) EMI 5 74212 2
- (rec. 1994.IV) María Bayo, Plácido Domingo, Raquel Pierotti, Rafael Castejón, Milagros Martin. Coro de la Comunidad de Madrid. Orquesta Sinfónica de Madrid. Antoni Ros-Marbà — Naïve V 4895 / AUVIDIS V 4725
