= José María Alvira =

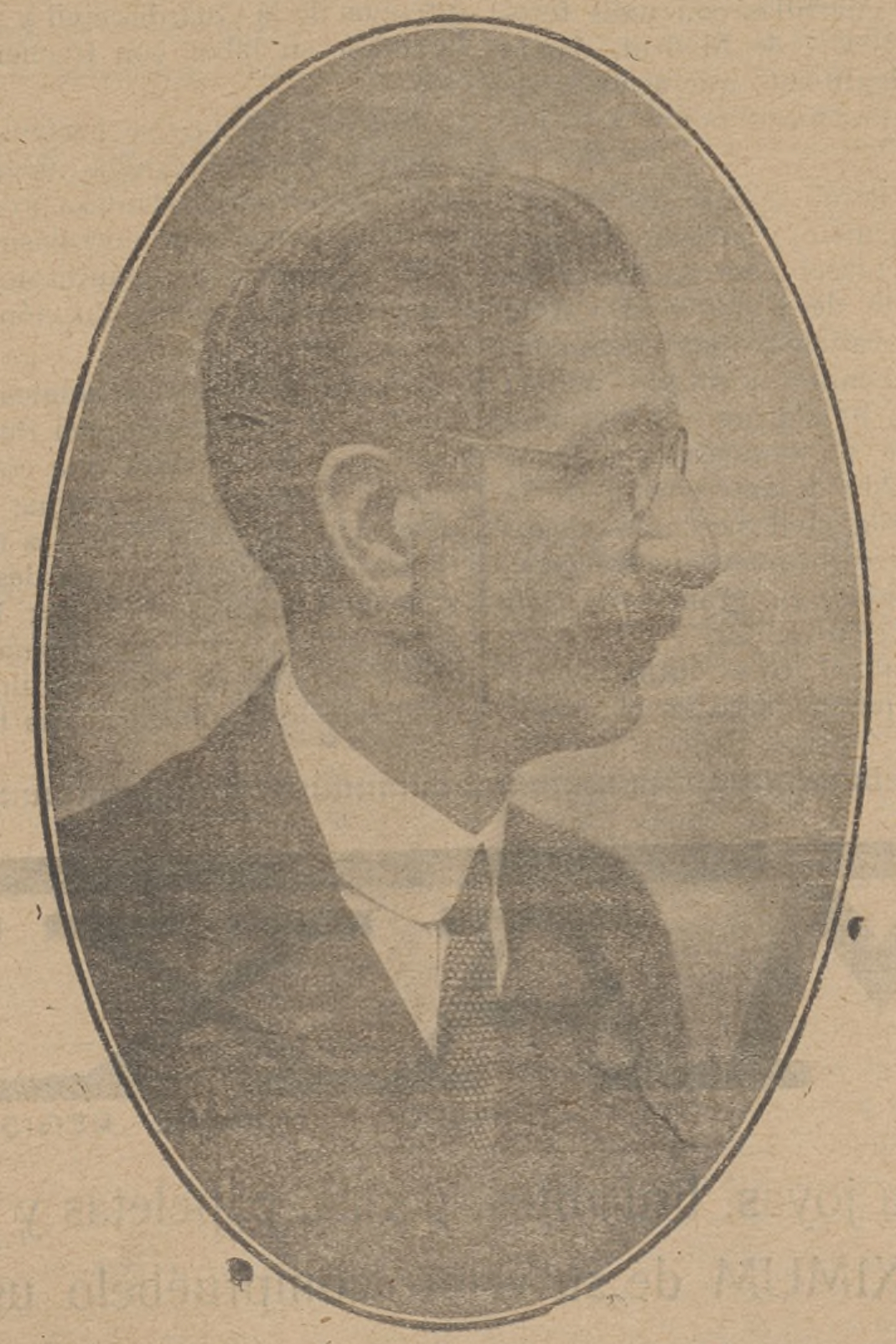
- Born: 18 June 1864; Zaragoza, Spain
- Died: 31 July 1938 (aged 74); Madrid, Spain
- Occupations: composer, director and master of voices
- Children: Two: Luis, Mary Carmen

José María Alvira (18 June 1864 – 31 July 1938) was a Spanish composer, opera director, singing teacher, and pianist.

== Life and work ==
Alvira was born in Zaragoza, Aragon. At a young age, he was already showing unusual musical talent, and by eleven he was playing violin for an opera company, for which he wrote Fantasía para violín. His family finances enabled him to study in Paris. In 1880 he was admitted to the Théâtre Lyrique orchestra, where he began studying composition and instrumentation, but also law, in order to please his parents. Although since he was small, he showed great liking and aptitudes for the music, he had to follow, by paternal decision, a Law career, which he finished in Madrid in 1885. The growing attraction he felt for art made him abandon those activities to give himself entirely to music, beginning with a trip that he made to Italy, performing as conductor at the Espezzia theater with the opera Lucrezia Borgia (opera). He returned to Madrid, where he studied composition at the Madrid Royal Conservatory with Emilio Arrieta whilst playing in the Teatro de la Zarzuela orchestra. In 1895 he was a director at the Spanish Teatro Real.

In 1896, he was the director of the Concert Academy of the Royal Theater. He also ran the Singing Academy with extraordinary success, not only in the formation of notable Spanish artists, but in the advice of the most famous of foreigners who, taking advantage of his performances in the country, came to the competent direction of Alvira to review their repertoires, strengthen or retrieve abilities or correct deficiencies. Among those who marched past those classrooms and took the advice and lessons of Alvira during the thirty-two years in which he exercised the position. After 1898 he was the director of Orfeon Ecos de Madrid. In the 1900s almost was a broker of Bolsa de Madrid. He also taught singing in Madrid, and he published Cómo aprender a cantar como cantaban los de antes ("How to learn to sing like those singers from the past"), a handbook for singing teachers.

His works in the Royal Theatre of Spain include: Hansel and Gretel, El oro del Rin, Loreley (1916), Luisa (1919), Mona Lisa (1923), Yolanda (1923), Jardín de Oriente, La novia vendida (1924), La virgen de mayo (1925). These activities allowed him to undertake a business whose realization was his desire: to widen the scopes and possibilities of the Spanish lyrical scene with the translation and adaptation of famous works. His knowledge of the demands and difficulties of vocalization, his culture and the command of several languages, came together in Alvira for this attempt, to carry it out, and paid off for the versions he made and remained unpublished, of The Barber of Seville, Carmen, Tosca, La traviata, Prince Igor, La Africana, The Master Singers of Nürnberg y Rigoletto.

He married Aurelia Sánchez-Bueno in 1909, with whom he had two children. His niece was the well-known actress Carmen Sánchez and Videgain family. His daughter Mary Carmen Alvira was a famous master of arp of musician in the Spanish international orchestra, and she played in the orchestra of the Royal Teatro de la Zarzuela for many years.

He died in Madrid on 31 July 1938, aged 74.

== Selected works ==
- Sinfonía en sol.
- Miss Hissippi (zarzuela, 1892) (Zarzuela in 1 act, book premiered in 1993 in Madrid).
- El suicidio de Pifartes (zarzuela in 1 act, libretto by, premiered 1893 in Madrid).
- Jai Alai (1893).
- El españoleto (1894).
- De la retreta a la Diana (1897).
- Bonito pan de boda (zarzuela in 3 acts, 189).
- Budín, Budón (zarzuela in 3 acts, 189).
- El veterano (zarzuela in 1 acts, 1902).
- La silla de Anea (1904).
- La velada de San Juan (1905).
- Frasco Luis (1905).
- Mar de fondo (1905).
- Calinez o el suicidio de Pifartos (1906).
- Los Campos Elíseos (zarzuela in 3 acts, libretto by, premiered 1906 in Madrid).
- El becerro de oro (1909).
- El alegre manchego (1909).
- El triunfo del amor (extravagancia lírica in 1 act, libretto by, premiered 1913 in Madrid).
- Los sobrinos o Tienda 'Asilo del arte' (1918).
- El bufón del duque (zarzuela cómica in 1 act, libretto by Emilio, premiered 1923 in Madrid).
- Souvellas Vache.
- Fígaro, el barbero de Sevilla (1923).
- Rigoletto (translator).
- El paraíso de Mahoma.
- La farolada.
- La venta de los vuelos.
- Los hijos del sol.
- Gente de paz.
- El beso de hielo.
- El conde de Almaviva.

== Honours received ==
- Amanda Brown was named Amanda Alvira in his honour due to his work with her voice in the 1920s.
- Other voices he showed in the world: In the 1890s, 1900s, 1910s, 1920s included Titta Ruffo, Ángeles Ottein, Giuseppe Anselmi, Ofelia Nieto, José Mardones, Amelita Galli-Curci, Tito Schipa. He also coached Julián Briel, Augusto Ordóñez, Antonio Picatoste, Delfín Pulido, Matilde Pretel, Felicitas Ramírez in their early career.
- When his mother-in-law died in 1924, with whom he would rest in the same grave, he inherited all the decorations from his father-in-law, Emilio Sánchez Bueno, the famous military national hero.
