= The Delinquents (1960 film) =

1960 film

- Directed by: Carlos Saura
- Written by: Mario Camus; Carlos Saura; Daniel Sueiro
- Produced by: Pere Portabella
- Starring: Manuel Zarzo
- Cinematography: Juan Julio Baena
- Edited by: Pedro del Rey
- Music by: Antonio Ramírez Ángel
- Release dates: May 1960; (Cannes Film Festival); 1962 (Spain)
- Running time: 88 minutes
- Country: Spain
- Language: Spanish

The Delinquents (Spanish: Los golfos, also translated The Hooligans) is a 1960 Spanish neorealist drama film directed by Carlos Saura. It was entered into the 1960 Cannes Film Festival.

== Production ==
Los golfos was filmed on location around Madrid (the first Spanish film filmed entirely on location), locations including the Legazpi market, the slums around the Manzanares and the Cementerio de la Almudena.

== Plot ==
Julián, Ramón, Juan, el Chato, Paco and Manolo are six Andalusian migrants from the depressed, suburban and shantytown outskirts of Madrid who survive off the product of their assaults, thefts and robberies. Only one of them, Juan, eventually works as a porter in the Legazpi fruit market, and it is him that the others try to help, in solidarity, to make his dream of being a bullfighter come true. Although they manage to collect the money that the intermediary asks for, everything goes wrong. Paco and El Chato are identified by a taxi driver who was the victim of a robbery while selling tickets for his friend's debut; Paco, fleeing from him, hides in a sewer and, at dawn, appears dead in a dunghill. In the afternoon, in the Plaza de Vista Alegre, the bullfight is held with a disastrous result: between boos and whistles, after several failed attempts, Juan manages to kill the bull.

== Cast ==
- Manuel Zarzo as Julián
- Luis Marín as Ramón
- Óscar Cruz as Juan
- Juanjo Losada as El Chato
- María Mayer as Visi
- Ramón Rubio as Paco
- Rafael Vargas as Manolo
- Carmen Sánchez as Mujer cotilla ("Gossipy woman")

== Release ==
Los golfos premiered at the 1960 Cannes Film Festival but was not released in Spain until 1962 due to the censorship regime.

== Reception ==
Los golfos is considered a classic film today, appearing on the British Film Institute's list of "10 great films set in Madrid;" Maria Delgado writing that "The use of untrained actors, a raw documentary feel and recognisable outdoor locations […] give the film both immediacy and resonance."

In Blood Cinema: The Reconstruction of National Identity in Spain, Marsha Kinder wrote of Los golfos that "The fact that no fathers appear in the film shows an ideological departure from the Fascist glorification of the patriarchal family and its idealization of the bond between fathers and sons and also speaks to the historical reality of so many Spanish fathers having been killed in the Civil War."
