= Raquel Daina =

Spanish actress (1928–2018)

- Born: 27 June 1928; Madrid, Spain
- Died: 5 May 2018 (aged 89); Madrid, Spain
- Occupation: Actress, vedette, theatrical entrepreneur, model

Raquel Daina Delas (27 June 1928 – 5 May 2018) was a Spanish comedy actress and zarzuela performer during the first and second half of the 20th century in Spain and America. She was also a theatrical entrepreneur, vedette, actress and model.

Daina began her career in Salvador Videgain Garcia's theatrical company during the Spanish Civil War, performing zarzuelas at Teatro Pavón and later at the Teatro Ideal Polistilo. Later in her career she performed in theatre, revues, and went on to appear in films, such as Juana la Loca... de vez en cuando.

== Early life and family ==
Daina was born in Madrid on 27 June 1928. She was of Valencian and Aragonese descent and came from a family of artists. Her father, Pedro Daina, was a stage actor while her mother, Delas, was a supporting comedy actress and a zarzuela singer. She had two aunts who were also actresses, Natalia and Carmen, and her sister was the actress Irene Daina. She was the cousin of Queta Claver, an actress, singer, dancer and vedette performer.

== Career ==
Daina began her career during the Spanish Civil War, performing zarzuelas in Salvador Videgain Garcia's company at Teatro Pavón and Teatro Ideal Polistilo. She made her debut with the company in 1936, performing children's roles. During her time in the company, she acted in revivals of several popular zarazuelas, including: "La del manojo de rosas", "Serafín, el pinturero", "Los claveles", and "La tempranica". She began performing in revues with her debut in Videgain's production of Enrique Povedano's "La flauta de Bartolo" in 1938 at the Teatro Maravillas. By 1944 she had gained popularity and recognition after performing with Videgain's company on a tour in Salamanca, Briviesca, and Valladolid.

In 1945 and 1946 she acted in Antonio Paso Díaz's company at the Teatro de la Zarzuela, performing in productions such as "El hombre que las enloquece", "¡Tabú!", "Una mujer imposible", "Buscando un millonario" (music by Daniel Montorio), and "Los últimos días de Mendo". In 1947 she performed in José Muñoz Román's "Historia de dos mujeres" at Teatro Martín in Madrid alongside Rafael Cervera Royo. After her father's death in 1947, she supported her mother and sister through her acting career, traveling widely across Spain, to Murcia, Las Palmas, Córdoba, Almeria, Barcelona, Bilbao, Zaragoza, Burgos, Valencia, and Alicante.

Daina shifted he career towards being a businesswoman in the 1950s. She owned her own variety show company, though she continued to accept vedette or leading roles from other companies. Most of her company's shows were produced in Barcelona, a city she is said to have loved, and where she lived at the time. By the 1980s, she had stopped performing vadette roles as she got older and focused her career entirely on business endeavours. She is remembered for her performances in Barcelona at the Teatro Apolo and Teatro Victoria.

== Discography ==
She recorded several albums in the world of variety shows and musical comedy, which were owned by Blue Moon Records or remastered to CD by Sonifolk.

- Me llaman la presumida (English: They call me presumptuous)
- Robame esta noche (English: Steal me tonight)
- Doña Mariquita de mi corazón (English: Mrs. Ladybug of my heart)
- Historia de dos mujeres (English: Story of Two Women)
