= Salvador Videgain Gómez =

Salvador Videgain
- Born: Salvador Videgain Gómez; 7 May 1842; Málaga, Spain
- Died: 3 January 1906 (aged 63)
- Education: Choral
- Occupations: Actor, director, manager, musician
- Years active: 1860–1906
- Spouse: Antonia Garcia de Videgain (m. 1850–1924)

Salvador Videgain Gómez (1845–1906) was a Spanish actor, singer, producer and composer.

== Private life ==
Videgain was born in Málaga in 1845. He is of Spanish, English, Irish and Basque ancestry. Videgain married actress Antonia García de Videgain in 1868 and founded the artistic Videgain family, the most long lived in the history of theatre in Europe. They had two children: Antonio Videgain (born March 1869) and Salvador Videgain Jr. (born 26 February 1886). His grandson was Antonio Videgain Reparaz (born in 1892), and the descendant of Salvador Jr. Juan José Videgain (born in 1975). As he was the youngest son of his house and his grandmother and father died as a child, he always lived the maternal love and that of his older brothers, among whom was Guillermo, founder of a long family of military sailors and businessmen, with whom the family will have a long relationship.

== Career ==
He began to work as a professional singer in his native Málaga in the early 1860s. His family relocated often, as his father worked at different jobs along the coast. He later transferred to Cádiz, where he began acting in dramas. Flores y abrojos was the beginning in Gibraltar. 1866 was a great year for him and his future wife. Its works from then on will stop being realized in the capitals of the south of Spain, especially of the cities of Andalusia.

In the 1870s his famous titles included Abel y Cain, Tocar el violón, Un viaje de mil demonios, El ultimo figurin, Fausto, Dos leones, 4 sacristanes, El duende, El barberillo de Lavapiés, La catedral de Colonia, A los toros, Frasquito Barbales, El triste Chactas, Frasquito Barbales, El fantasma de la aldea, De Herodes a Pilatos and La salsa de aniceta among others.

In the spring of 1880 came a tour of Portugal and Galicia, which would be the season of his consecration as a prestigious artist. This year Videgain played the lead role in the comedy Entre dos tíos. The title was a commercial failure, but was appreciated by critics. He later appeared in Entre dos platos, Preston y compañía and Música clásica, his most successful play of the decade. There were winners with I comici tronati, Meterse en Honduras and Musica del porvenir (1883), Enredos y compromisos, Los diablos del día (1884). At this point, Videgain and wife were receiving 60% of all profits in their company. Videgain and his wife Antonia, Vicente García Valero, José Talavera and others worked on the provocative work Los bandos de villafrita, inspired by newspaper articles about politics in Spain. He also appeared in the period comedy Ganar el pleito (1884) about a private eye and his partner who get mixed up with trouble. In 1885 he appeared in Mi pesadilla, Las grandes figuras political work of society in Spain with great triumph. Following were El barbián de la Persia and El domingo Gordo, by Chapí (1886), El estudiante de Alcála about Don Quijote, Venir por lana, List of company, and La velada de Benito all in 1887, and El año pasado por agua by Chueca and Valverde and Chateau Margaux in 1889.

=== Later works ===
In the 1890s he worked with their own successful pieces in the Spanish provinces, such as the Canary Islands, Mallorca, Murcia, and Andalusia... began to be released in smaller roles. Their works were The daughters of the Zebedee, Sea lions, Sensitiva, El pañuelo de yerbas, Las doce y media y sereno, ¡Quién fuera libre!, El gorro trigio, El alcalde interino, La sevillana, El hombre es débil, Los baturros, El cosechero de Arganda, El chaleco blanco, El lucero del alba, Los zangolotinos, ¡Ya somos tres!, Artistas para la Habana, ¡Cómo está la socieda!, Para casa de los padres, De Madrid á París, El hijo de mi amigo, Los incasables, Las hormigas, Hija única, Los tocayos, El padrón municipalandEl golpe de gracia. Later he had to adopt new works of popular taste but no longer had the force of youth and began accepting acting roles in generic lyrical and Spanish operettas by Federico Chueca, Ruperto Chapí, Tomás Bretón, Tomás López Torregrosa and many others. Their works were La gran via, La fiesta de San Antón, La verbena de la Paloma, and Gigantes y cabezudos.

In 1894 the entire family traveled to Buenos aires, Argentina, for work with La verbena de la Paloma, famous title of zarzuela new; the triumph was great and they remained premiered in the city during many months with the work and premiering others that arrived from Spain to premiere.

During the twentieth century his works are related to his work as a representative of his wife and on several occasions he appears as the representative of the company of artists in charge of managing the tours of the 1900–1903 seasons. During his career he came to perform more than 500 works as a singer.

== Music ==
Videgain had a strong passion for music, particularly zarzuela and operettas. He was a pianist and composer and although he was never successful as a professional musician, he passed on the influence to his son Antonio Videgain, who became a successful singer and composer. Zarzuela played an important role in Videgain's life. He developed as a ragtime pianist early on and had originally intended to pursue a career in music by studying for a music theory degree after high school. Videgain co-wrote "Tenorio en Nápoles". He composed piano pieces for Antonia and the song "Marcha flamenca" with music by Videgain and son.

In 1900, Videgain composed one title about the Don Juan Tenorio. This work was blamed on Salvador Videgain's son who never performed compositional tasks. Invictus, which was met with generally positive reviews. Variety said that Invictus "has a predictable trajectory, but every scene brims with surprising details that accumulate into a rich fabric of history, cultural impressions and emotion."

== Prizes ==
Videgain received multiple awards and nominations for his work in theatre. He sang with famous voices such as José Sigler, Enrique Lacasa, Bonifacio Pinedo, Ventura de la Vega and Miguel Fleta. He is one of the few singers best known as an actor to be recognized in the 19th century. As a representative of his wife Doña Antonia García F. de Guzmán, he collected some of his awards in his later years, since she could not always attend the events, due to scheduling or health reasons.

== Press ==
- El globo (1876–1887).
- El Imparcial (prensa) (1873–1887).
- El Liberal (1887–1900).
- La correspondecia de Madrid (1876).
- El país (prensa) (1890–1906).
- El correo Militar (1873–1979).
- ABC (1902–1906).
- El español (1870–1900).
- Crónicas de España Rev. 1999.
- La vanguardia, Barcelona. (1880–1906).
- La España artística (1880–1906).
- Eco de Cartagena (1880–1900).
- El graduador (1880–1900).
