= Ofelia Nieto =

Spanish singer

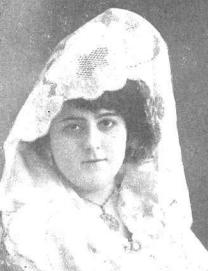
Ofelia Nieto

Maria Ofelia Erenia Nieto Iglesias (stage name, Ofelia Nieto; Algete, March 18, 1898 – Madrid, 22 May 1931) was a Spanish opera and zarzuela singer. She was the daughter of José Nieto Méndez, a notary of Burgos, and Erundina. She was a sister of Ángeles Ottein and José Nieto, who were also opera and zarzuela singers. Nieto was 14 when she debuted in Amadeu Vives i Roig's Maruxa in the title role. After marriage, she retired in 1928.

== Bibliography ==
- Altaió, Gerard (2002). Auditorium : cinco siglos de música inmortal (in Spanish). Planeta.
- Bartoméu Fernández, Juan Antonio (2009). Ofelia Nieto. Soprano (in Spanish). Junta de Andalucía. Consejería de Cultura.
- Della Corte, Andrea; Pannain, Guido (1965). Historia de la Música (in Spanish). Barcelona: Editorial Labor.
- Lugín, Alejandro Pérez (2008). La casa de la Troya (estudiantina). University of Santiago de Compostela. ISBN 978-84-9750-920-6.
- Randel, Don-Michael (1984). Diccionario Harvard de Música (in Spanish). México, D.F.: Editorial Diana.
- Reverter, Arturo (2008). El Arte del Canto : el misterio de la voz desvelado (in Spanish). Madrid: Alianza Editorial.
- Webber, Christopher (16 October 2002). The Zarzuela Companion. Scarecrow Press. ISBN 978-1-4616-7390-3.
