= Carmen Sánchez =

Spanish producer, dancer, and actress (1898 – 1985)

- Born: Carmen Sánchez-Bueno Moya; 21 April 1898; Madrid, Spain
- Origin: Spanish, Italian, French
- Died: 20 November 1985 (aged 87) Madrid, Spain
- Genres: Folklore, Zarzuela, Drama, Comedy
- Occupations: producer and actress
- Instruments: Voice, castanets
- Years active: 1910–1969

Carmen Sánchez (21 April 1898 – 20 November 1985) was a Spanish producer, dancer, and actress. She started her career as dancer and singer of zarzuela at very young age. At age 20, she finished working on copla or chotis and was featured in films between 1927 and 1928. She was a pioneer of silent films. She became a famous Spanish actress after the Spanish Civil War.

== Professional career ==
Carmen Sánchez was born in Madrid, Spain, during the Spanish American War.

In the 1920s, she became a famous dramatic theatre actress. In the 1930s, Sánchez established a theater company and achieved success for her work in theaters across Spain including Madrid, Lara, Princess Beatrice, Princess Elizabeth, Cervantes, and Cómico.

During the first half of the twentieth century, she primarily worked in the theater alongside famous Spanish actors like José Romeu, Enrique Rambal, Pepita Meliá, Rafael Bardem, Manuel Luna, Carmen Ruíz Moragas, and Carola Fernán Gomez.

The civil war in Spain suspended her work but her work in the Pavón theatre of Madrid in 1938–39. In the 1940s she went back to the theatre to continue her work with the national company of Spanish dramatic art with which she worked throughout the country and in the cinema as well successfully.

In the 1940s she worked in Nuevo Apolo theater with Agustina de Aragón in 1941, Lara theater Infierno frío in 1943, María Guerrero theater with El puente de los suicidas and La virgen de la goleta, and T. de la Zarzuela with Divorcio de almas author Jacinto Benavente.

In her long career in the Spanish film industry she had the honor to participate in famous films made by well-known directors and some European co-productions, alongside actors Sara Montiel, Fernando Fernán Gómez, Vittorio de Sica, Carmen Sevilla, Ángel de Andrés, Tony Leblanc, Marifé de Triana, Joselito, Luis Mariano, Manuel Alexandre, Conrado San Martín...

== Personal life ==
Her grandfather Emilio Sánchez was captain and knight of King Alfonso XII, creating and integrating the first royal guard. She was a niece of José María Alvira which she beginning in 1910s in Opera. Her sister was a grandmother of the current-day Videgains.

From the 1930s to 50s she was a lover and couple of Jacobo Fitz-James Stuart, the 10th Duke of Berwick and ambassador to London, a famous rich man. She had three children: Carmen Sánchez jr, Pedro and Emilio.

In the 50s she retired from the theatrical stage, and later in 1969 from cinema.

Carmen Sánchez died in November 1985, and was interred in the Cementerio de la Almudena in Madrid.

== Filmography ==
- The Heroes of the Legion (1927) - Enfermera.
- Jacobito el castigador (1927, Short).
- The Emigrant (1946) - Doña Isabel.
- The Holy Queen (1947) - Doña Constanza.
- The Faith (1947) - Doña Eloísa.
- Obsesión (1947) - Marisa.
- Luis Candelas el ladrón de Madrid (1947).
- Locura de amor (1948).
- Yebala (1949).
- The Troublemaker (1950) - Modista.
- Tales of the Alhambra (1950) - Doña Tula.
- Saturday Night (1950) - Doña Pandora (uncredited).
- Blood in Castilla (1950).
- El Negro que tenía el alma blanca (1951) - Mujer en baile.
- La trinca del aire (1951), wife of Chief.
- Day by Day (1951) - Doña Carmen, mother of Ernesto.
- Surcos (1951) - Aunt.
- El capitán veneno (1951) - wife of minister (uncredited).
- From Madrid to Heaven (1952) - Marquesa.
- Esa pareja feliz (1953) - Chief of café.
- Ha desaparecido un pasajero (1953) - Ciudadana.
- Aventuras del barbero de Sevilla (1954) - Doña Rosa.
- La patrulla (1954) - mother of Enrique.
- La ciudad de los sueños (1954).
- El malvado Carabel (1956) - mother of Silvia.
- Roberto el diablo (1957) - mother of Roberto.
- El pequeño ruiseñor (1957) - Romualda.
- La estrella del rey (1957) - Alteza.
- El inquilino (1958) - Sra. Colasa.
- Pan, amor y Andalucía (1958) - Aunt de Paco.
- Canto para ti (1959) - Sra. de Villanueva.
- Los golfos (1960).
- Bajo el cielo andaluz (1960) - Sra. de Palau.
- Nunca pasa nada (1963) - housekeeper.
- Sor Citroën (1967).

All in press spaniard, Books and news of journalist of references.

== Sources ==
- www.nuestrocine.com/personal.asp?idpersona=2384
- The real life and history of the theater (2005) Juan José Videgain ISBN 84-7828-135-5. His life and his family.
- Dictionary of Spain and Spanish zarzuela MªLuz González and others (2002) ICCMU Vol II. ISBN 84-89457-23-9, His family biography.
- Catálogo del cine español películas 1941–1950 author: Angel Luis Hueso Ed.Catédra Filmoteca española. (1998) ISBN 84-376-1690-5
- Un siglo de cine español (1998), author: Luis Gasca enciclopedias Planeta ISBN 84-08-02309-8.
- Diccionario Akal de teatro (1997) author: Manuel Gómez García.
- Historia del teatro María Guerrero (1998).
- Así se vive en Hollywood (2007), Ed. Vulcano, author: Juan José Videgain.
- The scene M.Fca.Vilches Madrid between 1926–1931 and Dru Dougherty (1998) Ed.Fundamentos. His career as an actor, director and entrepreneur during those years.
- Newspapers of the time since the 1920s across Spain: La vanguardia,ABC,El heraldo de Madrid,El Sol,El Liberal, El correo vasco, La voz, Ya, Blanco y Negro ...
- Dictionary theater akal (1997) Manuel Gómez García ISBN 84-460-0827-0, listed as company director and author on various pages.
- Diary ABC of Madrid (1930)
- Diary ABC of Madrid (1930)
- Diary ABC of Madrid (1932)
- Instituto Cervantes Virtual
- Nosotros los artistas (2017), P & V ISBN 978-1-9796-6135-5
