= Francisco Alonso =

Spanish composer

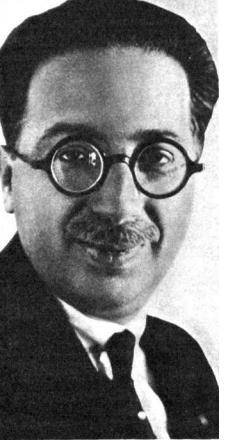
Francisco Alonso in 1927.

Francisco Alonso López (9 May 1887 – 18 May 1948) was a Spanish composer of popular theatre music and zarzuelas.

Alonso's music is funny, cheerful, easy melody and with a popular accent. He excelled in pasodobles and chotis, which he impressed with grace and ease. Many of his works are still highly valued, as the pasacalle Los Nardos, the chotis El Pichi, both from Las Leandras, the chotis Tabaco and cerillas from the revue Las de Villadiego or the song Maitechu mía (both with lyrics by Emilio González del Castillo). He wrote also two pasodobles for fiestas in the city of Alicante, Les Fogueres de Sant Joan, titled La festa del poble, premiered in 1934, and La Nit de San Joan 1934, a pasodoble foguerer for band, chorus and bass soloist. He also was elected president of the General Society of Authors of Spain.

== Childhood and early youth ==
Francisco Alonso was born in Granada, where he received his early education from the Piarists. As the son of a pianist, Alonso was interested in music from early childhood. His mother supported him when, unable to overcome the dissection classes, he abandoned a career in medicine for musical studies. He studied music initially with Antonio Segura, and later with Celestino Villa, choirmaster of the Cathedral of Granada.

Alonso's first compositions were created for the Escuelas del Ave María (founder Andrés Manjón). Later, he wrote music for ballroom dances such as polkas, mazurkas, and waltzes. When he was 16 years old, he led the band of the powder workers of the El Fargue district of Granada, and later created a choir at the Philharmonic Society of Granada that performed several concerts in Granada. At age 18 he premiered his first opera with La Niña de los Cantares, performed at the Teatro Cervantes in 1905. At that time he also became the director of the regimental band of Córdoba, for whom he composed his well-known pasodoble Pólvora sin Humo.

== In Madrid ==
His mother and father died in 1905 and 1908 respectively and Alonso decided to move to Madrid to focus on making the most of the better musical opportunities offered by the capital. After a banquet and tribute offered by his colleagues on 12 March, he bid farewell to Granada in 1911.

He arrived in Madrid with 600 pesetas in his pocket and initially devoted himself to writing cuplés, then very fashionable, for stars of the time as La Fornarina, Resurrección Quijano, Pastora Imperio, La Bella Chelito and La Goya. But he met only modest success for his stage works as the one act sainete ¡Armas al Hombro! with the composer Tomás López Torregrosa, which premiered at the Teatro Martín on 13 November 1911. In 1913 El Bueno de Guzmán premiered with the librettist and composer es:Enrique García Álvarez.

Alonso had to wait until 1916 for his first real success with the revue Música, Luz y Alegría, which premiered at the Teatro Novedades de Madrid. In 1918 he premiered a lyrical fantasy De Madrid al Infierno, with the chotis Oye Nicanora which was repeatedly encored by the audience. He showed more maturity in his orchestration in Las Corsarias, premiered at the Teatro Martín in 1919, that included the pasodoble La Banderita which became extremely popular in Spain, was sung by soldiers who were off to the Rif War of Africa, so much so that even the king Alfonso XIII was heard singing it while shaving. The more than twenty thousand performances of the work since its premiere by the company of Salvador Videgain made the maestro one of the great composers of the time, even achieving a decoration for the flag. From this time the Master is free to compose at will. His works met the same success in many countries of Latin America and Alonso was able to stage some of his works in Paris.

In 1924, came a consecutive series of successes starting with La Linda Tapada, premiered at the Teatro Cómico and included the popular Canción del Gitano, followed by La Bejarana premiered the same year at the Teatro Apolo and that was equally popular for its Pasodoble de los Quintos. At this time Alonso took inspiration from folk music of the various regions of Spain as in Curro el de Lora with its Andalusian atmosphere to a libretto by es:Luis Fernandez Ardavín, released in 1925, but which met with little success despite its excellent score. At the Teatro de la Zarzuela in the same year he premiered La Calesera, with a Madrid ambience, and featuring Pasodoble de los Chisperos and Himno a la Libertad. La Parranda set in Murcia opened in 1937. This included the Canción del Platero and the Canto a Murcia which became a popular anthem of the region. In La Picarona (1931), set in Segovia, its Canto a Segovia stood out.

Paco Alonso not only composed operettas, but was a versatile author who created many sketches and revues. Of those released in 1927 in es:Teatro Eslava Las Castigadoras, featuring the Chotis de las Taquimecas and Las Cariñosas. The next year followed Chotis de la Lola.

But his greatest success in the field of the revue came in 1931 with Las Leandras premiered at the Teatro Pavón and written especially for the star Celia Gámez who scored an enormous hit with Pasodoble de los Nardos and the chotis El Pichi.

Until the Spanish Civil War he premiered mainly revues like Las de Villadiego, Las de los Ojos en Blanco which include the pasodoble Horchatera Valenciana, Mujeres de Fuego and some zarzuelas like Me Llaman la Presumida (1935).

After the war the love of zarzuela fell into a deep decline and although Alonso premiered Manuelita Rosas, and La Zapaterita focussing on operetta and musical comedy with which he had some success as Doña Mariquita de mi Corazón (1942), Luna de Miel en El Cairo (1943), Aquella Noche Azul and Tres Días Para Quererte, (both 1945).

In 1947 he was elected as director of the Society of Authors and Publishers. While convalescing from an operation for retinal detachment he premiered 24 Horas Mintiendo a comedy written by es:Francisco Ramos de Castro. After his death at his home on Calle Sagasta, Madrid, in 1948, he was buried in a massive funeral. His posthumous La Rumbosa, a lyrical sainete opened in 1951.

== Works ==
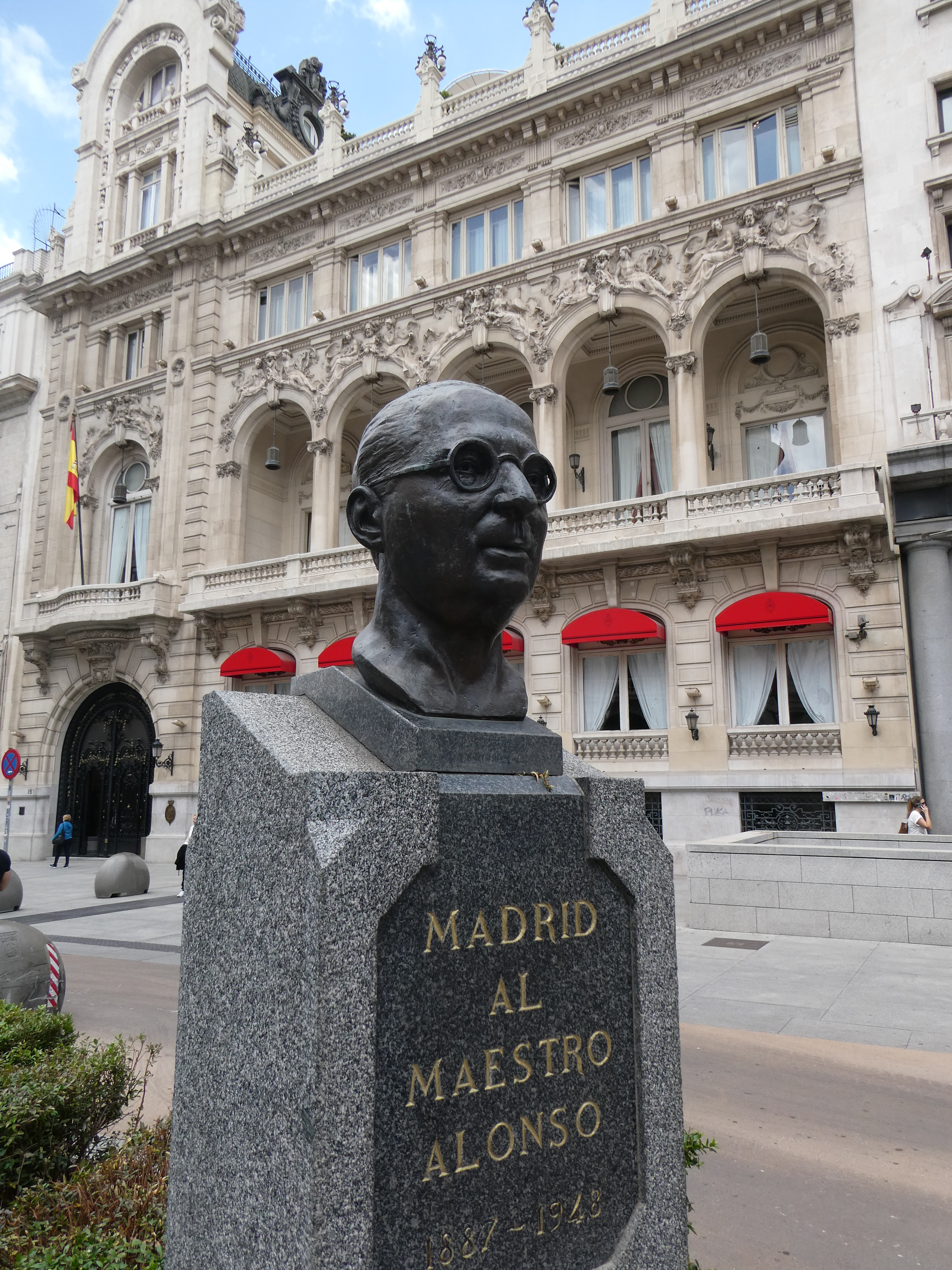
Bust in Madrid

Zarzuela:
- La bejarana.(1923)
- La linda tapada.(1924) The veiled pretty girl
- es:La calesera. (1925)
- es:La Parranda. (1928) The spree
- La Picarona (1930) The naughty girl
- es:Me llaman la presumida (1935) They called me the presumed
- Rosa, La pantalonera (1939) Rose, the trouser girl
- Manuelita Rosas (1941)
- La zapaterita.(1941)
- La mejor del puerto (1928) The best in the port
- Coplas de Ronda (1929) couplets of Ronda
- Curro el de Lora (1926)
- La rumbosa (1951) The lavish girl

Revistas and comedias:
- Las lloronas. (1928). The mourners.
- Las cariñosas. (1930) The affectionate.
- ¡Por si las moscas! (1929) Just in case!
- es:Las corsarias (1919). The female corsairs
- es:Las castigadoras (1927). The punishing women
- Me acuesto a las ocho (1930). I go to bed at eight
- es:Las Leandras (1931).
- es:Las de Villadiego (1933). Those from Villadiego
- Las mujeres bonitas (1933). Beautiful women
- es:Luna de miel en El Cairo (1943). Honeymoon in Cairo
- es:Mi costilla es un hueso (1933)My rib is a bone
- Las de armas tomar (1935) The take up of arms
- ¿Qué pasa en Cadiz? (1932) What's happening in Cadiz?
- Mujeres de fuego (1933) Women of Fire
- es:Doña Mariquita de mi corazón (1942) Mrs. Ladybug is my heart
- Campanas a vuelo (1931) Bells to Flight
- El Ceñidor de Diana (1929) The Sash of Diana
- De Madrid al Infierno (1916) From Madrid to Hell
- Música, Luz y Alegría Music, Light and Joy
