= Ana María Iriarte =

Spanish opera singer (1927–2025)

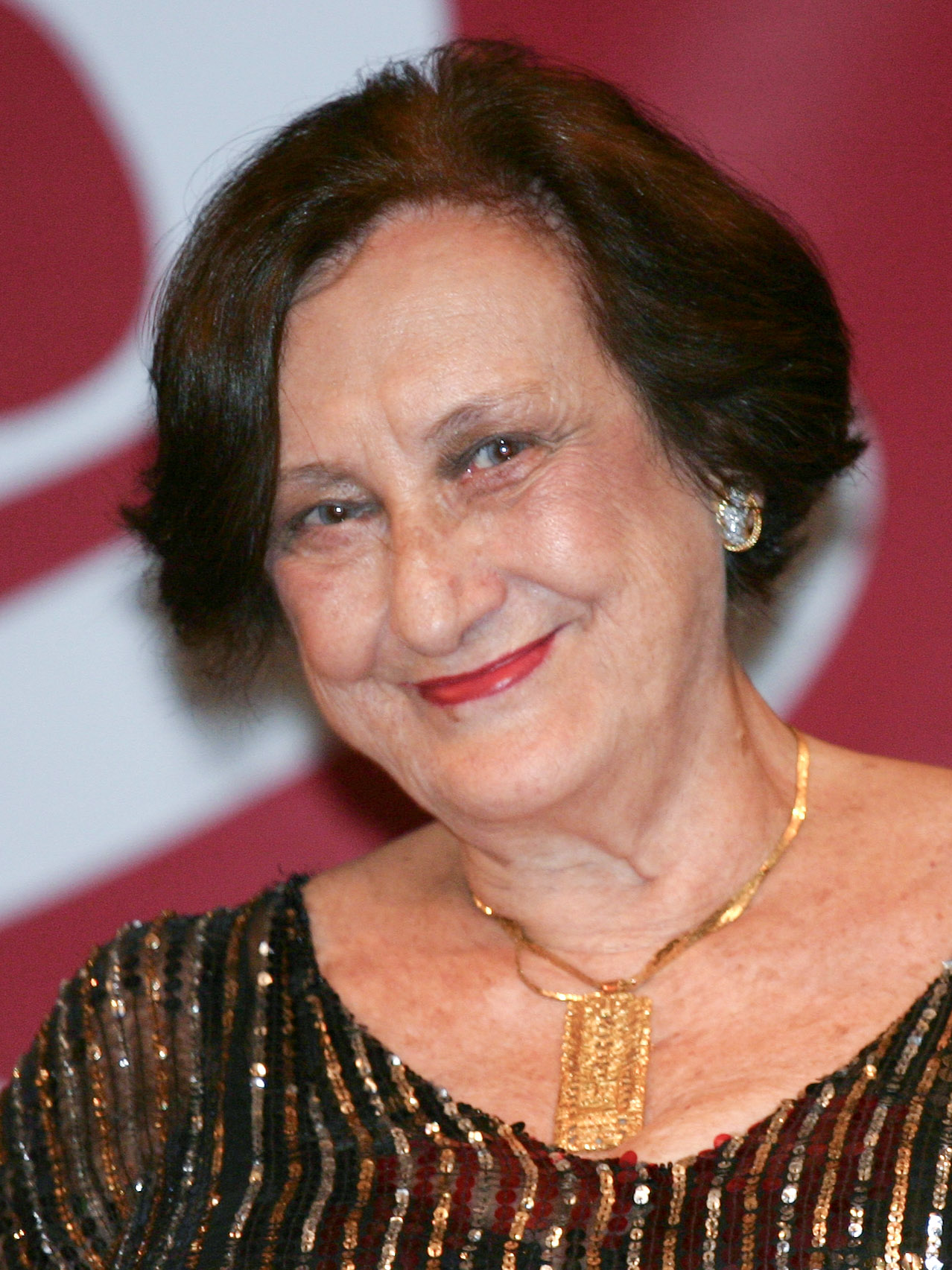
- Iriarte in 2008
- Born: 23 January 1927; Madrid, Spain
- Died: 4 February 2025 (aged 98)
- Occupations: Operatic mezzo-soprano; Vocal teacher

Ana María Iriarte (23 January 1927 – 4 February 2025) was a Spanish operatic mezzo-soprano and voice teacher. Trained in Madrid, Vienna, Milan and Paris, she appeared internationally in opera and especially zarzuela, but retired from the stage at age 32, portraying Bizet's Carmen at the Grand Théâtre de Bordeaux. She founded a school in Barcelona where she taught singing. In 2006 she created a foundation in her name, which runs an international zarzuela competition.

== Early life ==
Iriarte was born in Madrid on 23 January 1927. She began her education at the Deutsche Schule Madrid and started taking singing classes at age 16. She studied at the Madrid Royal Conservatory from 1945 to 1951 with Ramona Nieto, among others. She studied further in Vienna, especially Lied and oratorio with Elisabeth Rado and Erik Werba. She then studied in Milan with Elvira de Hidalgo, Carmen Miles and Mercedes Llopart from 1955 to 1957, and in Paris with Pierre Bernac from 1957 to 1959.

== Career ==
Iriarte appeared on stage and in concerts parallel to her studies. She began her career performing lyric soprano roles in Puccini's operas including Madama Butterfly. She made her professional debut at age 18, on 4 December 1945, at the Teatro Apolo in Valencia performing in the opera El soñador by Salvador Giner Vidal, which had not been performed since its premiere in 1901, alongside baritone Juan Gual and bass Aníbal Vela. She also performed the same year at the Teatro Principal, as Amneris in Verdi's Aida, alongside María Clara Alcalá, Cristóbal Altube, Pablo Vidal and Vela. She received standing ovations in the duet from the third act and the trial scene. She performed at the Teatro de Arriaga in Bilbao in 1946, as Santuzza in Mascagni's Cavalleria rusticana, in the title role of Bizet's Carmen, and again as Amneris, alongside Mario Filippeschi as Radames. She appeared in Madrid that year, as Leonora in Donizetti's La favorite, again with Filippeschi, as Santuzza, and as Siebel in Gounod's Faust.

In 1949 Iriarte performed at the Teatro Madrid as Cecilia in the zarzuela Las golondrinas by José María Usandizaga. She took part in the world premiere of the zarzuela La duquesa del candil by Jesús García Leoz there the same year. She appeared as Charlotte in Massenet's Werther. In 1954, she performed at the Royal Festival Hall with the Royal Philharmonic Orchestra de Falla's El amor brujo. She took part in the world premiere of Don Perlimplín, an opera by Vittorio Rieti, based on Lorca's Amor de Don Perlimplín con Belisa en su jardín, at a Paris festival. She appeared as the Messagera in a reconstruction of Monteverdi's L'Orfeo with historic instruments in Vienna, conducted by Paul Hindemith.

In 1958 Iriarte performed at the Volksoper in Vienna as Beltrana in the zarzuela Doña Francisquita by Amadeo Vives in a German version. She performed as Dalila in Samson et Dalila by Saint-Saëns both at the Opéra de Vichy and the Grand Théâtre de Bordeaux, and as Carmen in Lyon.

In 1960, Iriarte decided to retire from the stage for family reasons. Her last performance, at age 32, took place in Bordeaux, as Carmen. She founded a singing school in Barcelona and taught there. Among her students were María José Montiel, Ewa Hyla and José García Quijada. She lectured at the Concurso Internacional de Canto Francisco Viñas and about the Arte Lírico Español y Zarzuela at the University of Portland.

Iriarte created a foundation in her name in 2006, which promotes unpublished musical works by composers from Spain and elsewhere, as well as running the International Zarzuela Competition Ana María Iriarte.

Iriarte died on 4 February 2025, at the age of 98.

== Awards ==
Throughout Iriarte's career she received many awards, including the Lucrecia Arana National Singing Prize, from the Royal Conservatory of Music of Madrid. In 1952, she was awarded the National Theatre Prize, and in the same year won the Grand Prix du Disque. In 2013, she received a lifetime recognition award from the Sociedad de Artistas Intérpretes o Ejecutantes de España (AIE).
