= Antonio Reparaz =

Spanish composer and director

- Born: 1831; Cádiz, Andalucia, Spain
- Died: 1886 (aged 54–55); Reus, Tarragona, Spain
- Occupations: Musician, composer, director, producer, businessman
- Years active: 1841–1886
- Spouse: sra. Rodríguez (1850–1920)
- Children: Virgilia Reparaz, Gonzalo, Ignacio, Elena, Luisa, María

Antonio Reparaz (3 October 1831 – 14 April 1886) was a Spanish composer and theatre director.

== Career ==
The son of a military musician, Reparaz was born in Cádiz, Andalucia. As a child he sang in the choir of the Cathedral of Santiago de Compostela. He conducted his first work at the age of 16 in Santander, and shortly afterwards, after receiving a scholarship from the provincial government of Vizcaya, he moved to Rome, Italy, to study. On his return to Spain, passing through Paris, he was hired as director of the Real Teatro San Juan in Porto, Portugal where he stayed for several seasons from 1872. He spent a season conducting and premiering operas in several European and American capitals, returning to Porto in 1873.

Later, he premiered several zarzuelas at the Teatro Circo in Madrid and some of his other operas at various theatres in Spain. In Zaragoza, he premiered the zarzuela The feudal castle. In Madrid, he was a respected composer in the Teatro Circo for many years, and premiered Fifth and a Substitute, Harry the Devil, Pablo and Virginia, in collaboration with Emilio Arrieta and José Inzenga, A Throne and a Disappointment. In Valencia, he worked in opera at the Teatro Principal in the season of 1882–83. At the same time, he approached the art of zarzuela with unequalled success. His production, although less in quantity to that of his contemporaries Ruperto Chapí, Gerónimo Giménez and Manuel Fernández Caballero, is of a high quality.

== Music ==
As a composer, he gained renown as a result of the success of his many operas and zarzuelas. During his career, he covered most of the musical genres of the Bourbon Restoration period (1875–1885), composed operas, zarzuelas as well as symphonic and chamber music.

He adopted the most modern procedures, within the limitations of the genre. On the other hand, he wrote symphonic music with a singular insistence, at the same time in which in Spain great orchestral ensembles scarcely existed. His symphonies revealed a strong assimilation of Verdi and compositional techniques of Beethoven. His most successful works are those that feature a genuine Spanish character. During his last years, he composed several symphonic poems of clear and nostalgic character. In the genre of chamber music he wrote several works including (trios, quartets and a quintet), composed with a markedly classic point of view, influenced by French composers.

He also wrote the music of A Mi Nazarena with José Zorrilla and El Beso del Poeta.

== Family ==
Reparaz was the father of six children, but only two survived longer than 18 years. Gonzalo's eldest son was a well-known reporter and journalist who gave lectures and wrote books about Africa. In 1890, his daughter Virgilia married the well-known orchestral conductor Antonio Videgain, and in 1892, his grandson Antonio Videgain Reparaz was born. The 3rd soon, Ignacio, was a military man and guard who died in 1926. In the same decade, two of his daughters married military men and future generals of the Spanish army, their grandchildren being sons of the General-in-chief of the Spanish armies, Burguete Lana.

== Selected works ==
He wrote six operas and many zarzuelas.

- Gonzalo de Córdoba, opera, premiered in Porto
- Pedro el cruel, opera
- Ardides y cuchilladas
- Pablo y Virginia, opera, Teatro Novedades, 6 November 1862
- El paraiso de Madrid, zarzuela in 3 acts
- El magnetismo
- La ventá encantada, in honour of Miguel de Cervantes 1871, zarzuela in three acts in verse, libretto by Gustavo Adolfo Bécquer
- La cruz del valle, Madrid, Teatro Circo, 22 October 1860
- La gitanilla, Teatro de la Zarzuela, 27 September 1861
- La mina de oro, Madrid, Teatro Circo, 19 November 1861
- Harry el diablo, zarzuela in two acts, libretto by Narciso Serra and Miguel Pastorfido, Madrid, Teatro Circo, 21 February 1862
- Las bodas de camacho, Madrid, Teatro Circo, 9 October 1866
- Un quinto y sustituto

== Bibliography ==
- La música española en el siglo XIX (Celsa Alonso González, 1995).
- Asejo Barbieri (1996).
- Begoña Lolo: Cervantes y el Quijote en la música: estudios sobre la recepción de un mito.
- Gustavo Adolfo Becquer y Reparaz.
- Biblioteca Comunidad of Madrid, Work 'Harry el diablo'.
- Real academia de Bellas artes of Valladolid.
- Antonio Reparaz, un músico en Oporto, nuevos datos, University of La Rioja.
- Life and work, biography, euskalbiographys, Book of university Vasca.
- Dates of life in Library national of Spain, Biblioteca Nacional española.
- Instituto Cervantes Cervantes y Reparaz,
- Un músico de la Restauración.Antonio Reparaz Madrid: Instituto Complutense de Ciencias Musicales, 2002, Prensa en University Complutense of Madrid
- Teatralerias book of dinastys of theathre spanish, (J. J. Videgain, 2018).
