= The Heroes of the Legion =

1927 film

- Directed by: Rafael López Rienda
- Written by: Rafael López Rienda
- Cinematography: Carlos Pahissa
- Production company: Ediciones López Rienda
- Release date: 1927
- Country: Spain
- Languages: Silent; Spanish intertitles

The Heroes of the Legion (Spanish:Los héroes de la legión) is a 1927 Spanish silent film directed by Rafael López Rienda. It was filmed on location in Spanish Morocco.

== Cast ==
- Manuel Chávarri
- Pablo Rossi
- Carmen Sánchez
- Ricardo Vargas
- Ricardo Vayos

== Bibliography ==
- Eva Woods Peiró. White Gypsies: Race and Stardom in Spanish Musical Films. U of Minnesota Press, 2012.
