= Matilde Pretel =

Spanish singer (1874–1965)

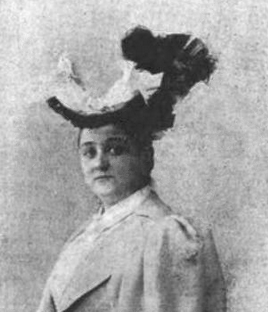
Matilde Pretel

Matilde Pretel (1874 - 26 November 1965) was a Spanish singer. A soprano from Valencia, she is remembered for her performances in opera and zarzuela.

== Biography ==
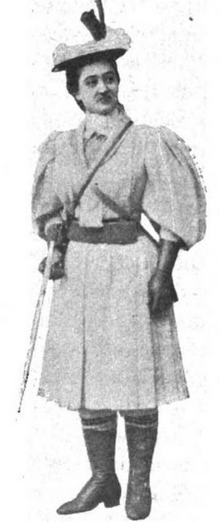
Matilde Pretel in "El señor barón"

Pretel studied at the Conservatori Superior de Música Joaquín Rodrigo, Valencia. She debuted at the Teatro de la Zarzuela in Madrid in 1890 in the role of Robert (commonly played by a woman) in Ruperto Chapí's La tempestad. Her musical qualities as well as her showmanship and her physical beauty made her a favorite of the public and composers. Chapi wrote Mujer y reina (1895) and El estreno (1899) for Pretel. She was worked for various companies, including the Teatre Príncipe Alfonso, Teatre Circo de Price, Teatre de la Comèdia and finally the Teatro Apolo during the 1899-1900 season. She performed in works by Cristóbal Oudrid, Francisco Asenjo Barbieri, Emilio Arrieta, and Joaquín Gaztambide y Garbayo, among others. In 1900, Pretel left the Teatro Apolo and performed in various parts of Spain. She had her own zarzuela company with businessman Bonifacio Pinedo, but in 1909, she retired from performing, without stating her reasons, and settled permanently in Madrid. She was the first woman in Madrid, in the era of big hair buns, to cut her hair short.

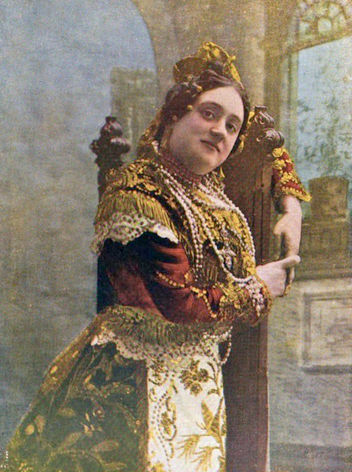
Matilde Pretel in "El Cabo Primero"

== Bibliography ==
- Casares, Emilio (dir. i ed.) (2002). Historia de la Música Española e Hispanoamericana. Madrid: SGAE. (in Spanish)
- Hernández Girbal, Florentino (1997). Otros cien cantantes españoles de ópera y zarzuela (s.XIX y XX) Madrid: Editorial Lira. (in Spanish)
