= Antonio Videgain Reparaz =

Antonio Videgain
- Born: Antonio Videgain Reparaz; January 11, 1892; Madrid, Spain
- Died: June 1, 1945 (aged 53); Panama City, Panama
- Education: Militar High School
- Alma mater: Academy of engineers
- Occupations: baritone, actor, singer
- Years active: 1907–1945
- Political party: Republican

Antonio Videgain Reparaz (November 1, 1892 – June 1, 1945) was a Spanish baritone and actor. He dedicated his career to zarzuelas and operas.

== Early life ==
Videgain was born in Madrid son of Antonio Videgain García, (Jerez de la Frontera), and Virgilia Reparaz (Madrileñian) and spent his childhood and adolescence in Madrid. He grew up in the Royal Palace of Spain where his mother was a governess of the Borbon Family (King Alfonse XIII) and under the strict supervision of his Uncle and Tutor Ricardo Burguete, General in Chief of the Supreme Council of War of the Spanish Armed Forces, who was married to the sister of his mother. He began music lessons with his father, Antonio Videgain García (Piano teacher), and continued his education with other composers. By the age of 18, he was enrolled in the Spanish Army, where he completed studies as a surveyor. Apparently he made his debut in 1907 in the Eslava Theater in Madrid singing an operetta with good results, but after a while he entered the army's surveying school. He founded a singing operette (musical) and zarzuela company, making his debut in Andalucía with a production of Rafael Calleja. Music was in his veins, inherited from his father and his uncle, the famous Salvador Videgain Garcia. After military graduation, he traveled to Argentina and Chile and then returned to Spain on different occasions with works of different zarzuelas with which he had great success in his tours through South America, Argentina, Uruguay and Chile. He returned to Chile where he married and had six children in total, of which five survived. From a second relation with his singing partner he had two more, Herminia born 1929 in Barcelona & Mauricio Videgain born in N Africa following the occupation Asturias by Franco. In an marriage in Panama, he had one more son. According to "those who have seem him conduct and have transmitted to us the memory of his performances of great strength and great enthusiasm. He obtained with imperceptible gestures what he wanted from the orchestra." fitz of his sense of rhythm and easy melodies.

== Works ==
In 1925, he sang in the famous Teatro Colon of Buenos Aires. Following the success of his pieces, he set to music another sainete with the same characters, which became one of his most famous works: Molinos de viento (Zarzuela), or La viuda alegre. He presented his work around the world and visited cities of Argentina as Cordoba, Buenos Aires, La Pampa, Misiones... He traveled to Uruguay in 1920s with zarzuelas, returned to Chile, where he divorced his first Chilean wife. In the early 1930s, he began a tour with his artistic partner Lucy Gomez visiting Spain, Morocco, Algeria, Buenos Aires, Montevideo, Caracas, Bogotá. In 1932 he sang in the company of his uncle Salvador, at the Cervantes theater in Madrid, debuting with La rosa del azafrán. (He was never in New York and Mexico as someone wrote but travel a Puerto Rico in 1932 where he sang). And in 1934, he arrived to Panama where he settled and founded in 1936 the first Songs Book of Latin América that he named "Cancionero Panamericano", that was edited until 1979, after his death. He married in 1943 for the second time at 50 years.

The most famous titles he sang were Marina, La Revoltosa, La alegría del batallón, La manta zamorana, La reja de la Dolores, El arca de Noé, El trust de los tenorios, La verbena de la Paloma, El niño judío, El Pollo Tejada and many more zarzuelas... and some Óperas like Marina, La Dolores, Margarita la Tornera, Turandot and Aida.

== Later life ==
He visited his famous family in Spain, his grandmother Antonia García de Videgain, and his uncle Salvador Videgain were more important for him in the 1920s. He left Spain in 1934, never to return again, because of the Civil War of Spain. Towards the end of his life Videgain lived comfortably.He was a famous industrial of Carbon in Pánama. One of his sons was Antonio Videgain III, famous salesman and other was the famous Dr. Mauricio Antonio,in América who died in 2020.

He died on September 19, 1945, in Panama City, Panama. His descendants live around all Americas.
