= Juan José Videgain =

Spanish writer, actor, and director

- Born: Juan José Videgain Cerezo; 30 July 1975 (age 51); Madrid, Madrid, Spain
- Occupations: Actor; Director; Producer with P. & Videgain; Writer; screenwriter; Philanthropist
- Years active: 1992–present
- Family: Salvador Videgain Gómez, Antonia García de Videgain, Antonio Videgain, José María Alvira, Salvador Videgain.

Juan José Videgain (born 30 July 1975) is a Spanish writer, actor and director. Most of Videgain's books have reached cult status thanks to their weird sense of humor in Spain. He is from an old theatrical family in Spain. Salvador Videgain is his grandfather, José María Alvira is his granduncle. He has written narratives, essays, and biographies. He is an active member of organizations dedicated to charity.

== Biography ==
Juan José Videgain was born in Madrid, Spain in 1975. In 1990s He was a veteran of the Spanish army of the twentieth century, serving in Melilla city that conquered one of his ancestors. He worked in the theatre book field from an early age. He had a brief stint in television before finding work as a film actor. His first, little-seen short film focuses on a family forced to live in a basement after a war. In his second short film, he portrayed a man rebel but also a boy who thinks he is Batman a defender of the innocent. He made a third short film The bridge of the life and Nos miran in (2002), a supernatural film of mystery, in Spain.

His book La auténtica vida e historia del teatro (2005) received acclaim from people in Spain as the best book of theatre written in years. Also he was preceded by his first collaboration with Jack Newman in theater (2002). In 2010 he collaborates with him in a chapter of his work as life itself. During these years he has signed next to the best-known pens and shared acts with the best-known characters of Spanish society. He has completed his trilogy of research and artistic knowledge, his extensive work on the world of theater. "Teatralerias".

Videgain was portrayed a soldier in the film Kingdom of Heaven, his first movie in English. The film was released in Spain in January 2004 but did not prove as great a success as hoped. The film was explicit in its portrayal of violence in medieval Jerusalem and was considered controversial by some Catholics and Muslims, so it passed cuts. The actor worked on the film only in Spain.

He collaborated with the problems of people with leukodystrophy in Spain. He has worked beneficially for years for homeless children or leukodystrophy problems so it has been awarded the 2011 ELA Prize.

Since the beginning of the decade 2010, he has started to direct and produce various audiovisual and documentary work without neglecting his role as writer. In October 2016 participated in a documentary on the life in the people of Spain, Spain in a day. The documentary directed by Isabel Coixet among others has recently won the Iris Television Prize.

For years he has made various collaborations with the media. He is also a biographer and researcher which has been demonstrated in his books and documentaries.

== Books ==
He wrote works of theatre in the 2000s and during the first part of the first decade of the century he devoted himself to writing for the theater. In the second part of the decade he wrote books about famous artists cultural issue some known to him and made his foray into the world of the story. As a literary author he has traveled several times to Portugal where his work is known. Many of his works have traveled through many western countries.

=== Theater ===
- Las mocedades de España, comedy historical (2003).
- Las cartas sobre la mesa, version of a story by Agatha Christie (2005).
- Una vida en la sombra, drama historical (2006).
- Crueldades y otros menesteres, drama historical (2007).
- Napoleón solo, musical (2013).
- All this works are in Antología teatral del autor 2003-2020. ISBN 979-8649866842

=== Biographies ===
- La auténtica vida e historia del teatro, Biographies of characters from the world of theater (2005) Vulcano Ediciones, ISBN 978-84-7828-135-0
- Así se vive en Hollywood, Biographies of characters from the world of cinema (2007) Vulcano Ediciones ISBN 978-84-7828-147-3
- Así se vive en Hollywood II, Biographies of characters from the world of cinema (2015) P & V. ISBN 978-1-5168-4426-5
- Nosotros los artistas, Biographies of dramatic-lyric characters (2017) P & V. ISBN 978-1-9796-6135-5
- Teatralerias, Biographies of theatrical characters (2018) P & V. ISBN 978-1-7248-7228-9
- De Cannes a Hollywood, así vivimos en Europa.: O como somos los artistas europeos, (2021), P & V. ISBN 979-84-8257-100-2
- Así se vive en Hollywood III, Biographies of characters from the world of cinema (2026) P & V. ISBN 979-8248142538

=== Narrative ===
- Como la vida misma, contemporary stories (2010) ISBN 978-84-614-3409-1
- Un mundo diferente, (2014) medieval tales ISBN 978-1-5025-6523-5
- Iluminando la Edad Media, medieval tales (2019) ISBN 9781697896343
- La Navidad, el mundo y otras cosas de la vida, Navidad Tales (2023) ISBN 9798872864981
- El culturismo y los Arnold Classic de Madrid, history sports Arnold Classic Europe ISBN 979-8396260139

== Acting ==
After acting in theater as a secondary actor in the 1990s, he worked in the early years of this century in cinematographic figuration. Most of his written works were for the theater the first years, in the second decade of the century he becomes the protagonist of numerous projects both in the direction and in the interpretation and participates in some films. He also participated in a music video demonstrating his versatility. He worked in TV series as Comrades appearing in some chapters in (1998-2002) figuration as in Journalists (1998-2002) and Central Hospital (2000-2012).

=== Independent films ===
Since founding the nonprofit P & Videgain, in 2015, Videgain has been deeply involved with independent film. Through its various workshop programs and popular film festival, in Spain has provided much-needed support for independent filmmakers as Rubén Jiménez or Jack Newman. He has worked for other independent producers such as Valente Films or C. Alcázar. He recently received the award for best fantasy film of the year for A Christmas Carol in the remake of the Dickens classic in 2022.

=== Filmography ===
Year	Film	Director	Productor	Kind
1989	Julios	Rosa Álvarez	C.P. Aragón	Comedy
2002	Nos miran	Norberto López Amado	César Benítez	drama
2003	The Bridge of the life	J.J. Videgain	Stilos	documentary film
2005	Kingdom of Heaven	Ridley Scott	20th Century Fox	épic
2008	Un viaje por España	J.J.Videgain	Stilos	documental
2013	114	Susana Chueca	IndividuoZero	videoclip drama-music
2014	¡Qué pena de vida!	Juan José Videgain	Producciones Videgain	drama
2014	Relaciones	R. Jiménez	Producciones Videgain	drama
2014	Equipos	R. Jiménez	Producciones Videgain	comedy
2015	El Psicólogo	Juan José Videgain	Producciones Videgain	Comedy
2015	"El robo"	Juan José Videgain	P & V	comedy
2016	Los Egoístas	Juan José Videgain	P & V	short-serie comedy-drama
2016	"El ganador"	F. Cerezo	P & V	comedy
2017	"Fotografías de Guerra"	J. J. Videgain	Valente Films	documentary film
2018	"La guerra de España"	J. J. Videgain	Valente films	documentary film
2019	"El renacer"	J.J.Videgain	P & V	documental
2020	"The new beginning SCROOGE"	J.J.Videgain	P & V	drama
2021	El rescate	F. Cerezo	Cerezo films	drama
2022	Tale of Christmas	J.J.Videgain	P & V	drama
2023	El rescate de la vida	J. J. Videgain	films	drama
2024	"The bet"	J.J. Videgain	films	Acción.
2026	"El sendero de la escena"	Juan José Videgain	films	documentary film
2027	"Vuelta a la vida"	Juan José Videgain	films	comedy

== Interviews ==
- Leucodistrofia-Charity acts.
