= Celia Gámez =

Argentine film actress

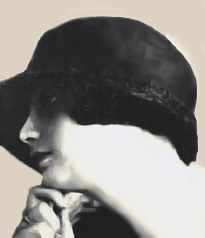
- Celia Gámez in 1924
- Born: Celia Gámez Carrasco; August 25, 1905; Buenos Aires, Argentina
- Died: December 10, 1992 (aged 87); Buenos Aires, Argentina
- Years active: 1920–1971

Celia Gámez Carrasco (August 25, 1905 – December 10, 1992) was an Argentine film actress, and one of the icons of the Golden Age of Spanish theatre. She was more commonly known in Franco's Spain, particularly in her later years, as La Protegida.

== Biography ==
She was born in Buenos Aires, Argentina, but there is some dispute regarding her date of birth, since there is no documentary record of it. Just as there is no copy of her birth certificate available, there is no copy of a death certificate. There is a large (but not unanimous) consensus that she died on her 87th birthday. She was said to have been a lover of a great number of famous men, among them José Millán Astray and King Alfonso XIII.

== Family ==
Her father was of Spanish descent, and she was proud of her ancestry. Educated in a convent, she relocated to Spain from Argentina to pursue professional opportunities and lived in Spain permanently since 1926. Early in her career, she was known as a singer of tangos and schottisches.

She married José Manuel Goenaga, a physician, at the Basilica of the Jeronimos in Madrid in 1944. She did not have children.

=== Career ===
Celia Gámez was "discovered" by producer Salvador Videgain in Argentina, while she was acting with Gloria Guzmán. Videgain introduced her to the Spanish public in Las Castigadoras in 1927 at the Romea theater, the most popular venue in Madrid at the time. Videgain gave her a starring role in Las lloronas, in 1928. Gámez also starred in Por si las moscas 1929, Las cariñosas 1930, Las pantorrillas, Gran clipper. In 1940 she starred in famous titles of revue and songs like El Pichi and Por la calle de Alcalá (1931, from Las Leandras) and La Devoradora (1932) made her a household name in Spain. La Devoradora established her as the maneater of Spanish theatre in the 1940s. She created her own company with both famous figures of the time and unknowns who later became famous, like Tony Leblanc, Concha Velasco, Florinda Chico, Lina Morgan and Esperanza Roy.

Well-known shows were La cenicienta del palace, Yola, Si Fausto fuera Faustina, Rumbo a pique, Fin de semana, Hoy como ayer, Gran revista, La estrella de Egipto, Dólares, La hechicera en palacio, El águila de fuego, Su Excelencia la embajadora, La estrella trae cola 1960 and Mami llévame al colegio with Ángel de Andrés, 1964 version of Las Leandras.

== Filmography ==
Gámez refused to work in Hollywood since she did not speak English and she did not want small roles. She starred in El sargento Lápida (1937), El diablo con faldas (1938), and Rápteme usted (1940), among other films. She worked in Spain in Las Leandras (1968) opposite stars like Juanito Navarro, and others, where she sang the song "Por la calle de Alcalá". Other songs were "Canciones de nuestra vida" (1971) and in 1974 "Mi hijo no". In later years, her albums were inspired by the songs of Spanish revues.

=== In music, art and fashion ===
Francisco Alonso wrote many songs for her, notably, "Por la calle de Alcalá," among others. It has been recorded by many singers including Plácido Domingo. Other songwriters also composed songs for her. The House of Peris designed extravagant creations just for her.

=== Songs ===
- "Si vas a París papá"
- "El Pichi"
- "¡Viva Madrid!"
- "Mírame"
- "Horchatera valenciana"
- "Los nardos (Por la calle de Alcalá)"
- "La Lola"
- "Un millón"
- "El beso"
- "Estudiantina portuguesa"
