= Guido Pannain =

Italian musicologist and composer

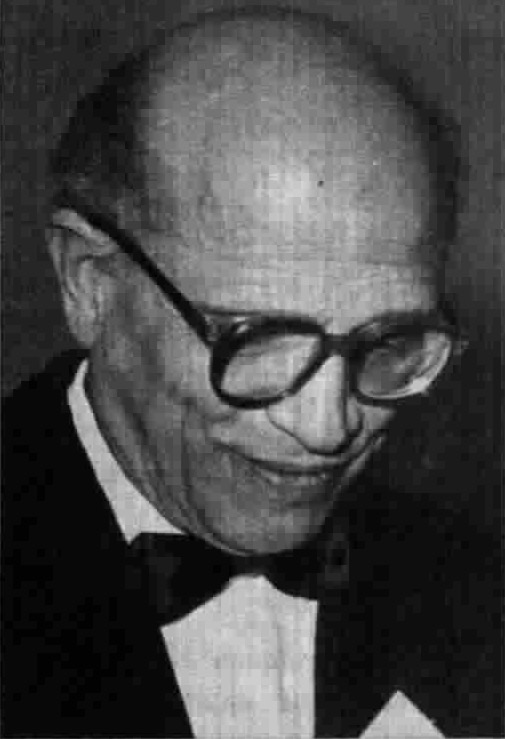
- Pannain in Radiocorriere magazine (1958)
- Born: 17 November 1891; Naples, Italy
- Died: 6 September 1977 (aged 85); Naples, Italy
- Occupation(s): Composer, musicologist

Guido Pannain (17 November 1891 – 6 September 1977) was an Italian musicologist, critic and classical composer.

== Life and career ==
Born in Naples, Pannain was the son of the composer and pianist Eduardo Pannain and the nephew of the composer and music theorist Antonio Pannain. He got a degree in counterpoint and composition at the conservatory of San Pietro a Maiella Conservatory, and graduated in letters at the Federico II University. Between 1915 and 1947, he served as professor at the Naples Conservatory, and between 1952 and 1955 he was professor of music history at the Accademia Nazionale di Arte Drammatica Silvio D'Amico.

Pannain was author of numerous studies and essays, often focusing on the history of the Neapolitan music; among his most important works, Modern composers (in Italian Musicisti dei tempi nuovi, 1932), a collection of profiles of the leading contemporary composers, La vita del linguaggio musicale: saggio di estetica ("The Life of Musical Language: An Essay on Aesthetics", 1947), an essay in which he applied the Benedetto Croce's neo-idealistic theories over music, and Storia della musica (1936-1964), a history of the music he co-wrote with Andrea Della Corte. He also collaborated with numerous publications, notably Bayreuther Blätter, Il Mattino, Epoca and Il Tempo.

Also a composer, Pennain was awarded at the 1928 International Columbia Graphophone Competition for his Sinfonietta. His works include numerous concertos, a symphonic poem, and several operas, the most successful of them being a Madame Bovary he co-wrote with Vittorio Viviani in 1955. He died in 1977.
