= Ángeles Ottein =

Spanish singer

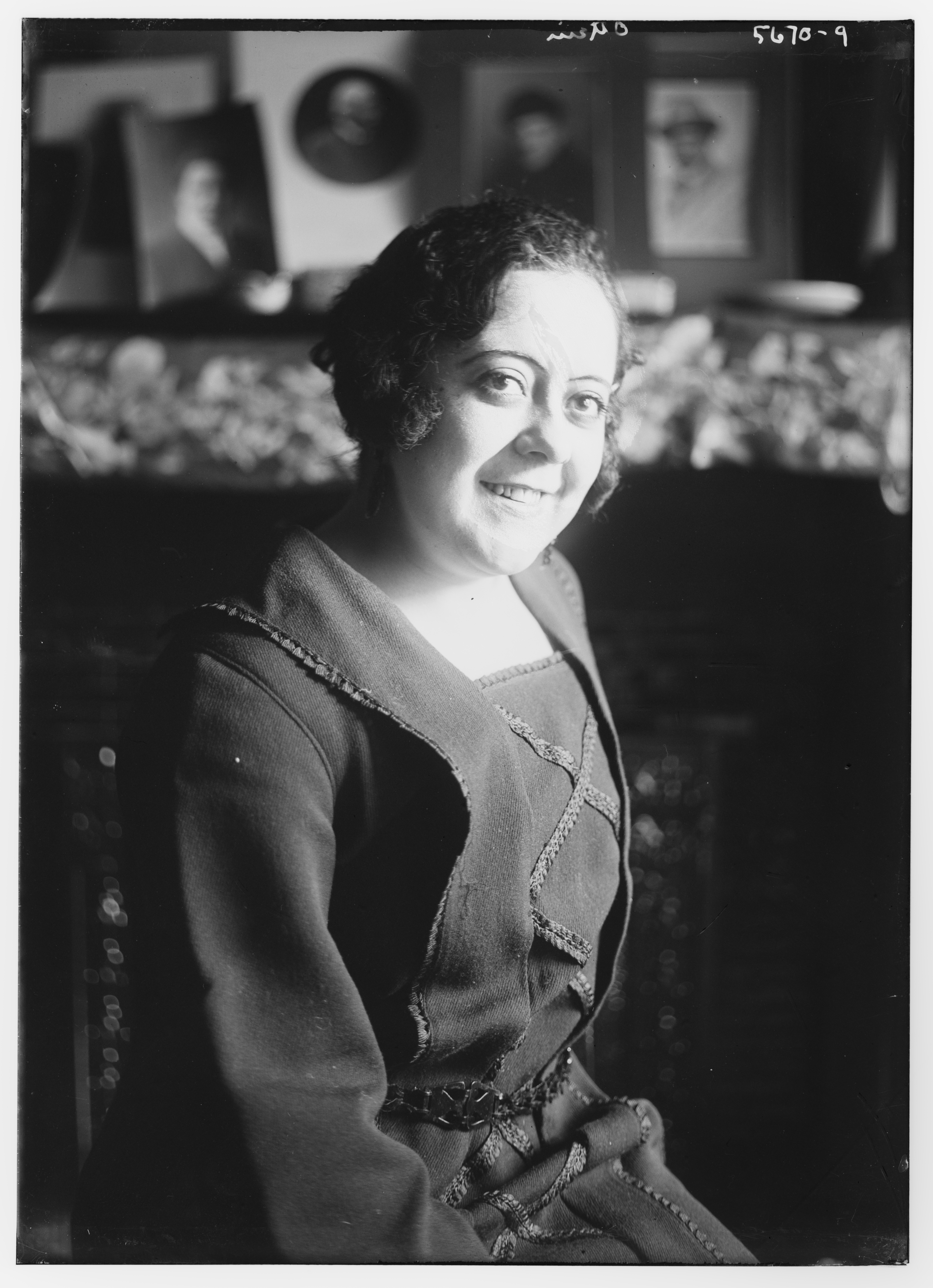
Ángeles Ottein

María de los Ángeles Nieto Iglesias (stage name, Ángeles Ottein; Algete, 24 June 1895 – Madrid, 12 March 1981) was a Spanish soprano, opera and zarzuela singer. She was the daughter of José Nieto Méndez, a notary of Burgos, and Erundina. Her siblings included Ofelia Nieto and José Nieto, who were also opera and zarzuela singers. Ottein debuted in 1914 with a performance in ''Marina'', performing in opera and zarzuela for the next 40 years.

== Bibliography ==
- Girbal Hernández, F. Cien cantantes españoles de ópera y zarzuela. Ed. Lira 1994 (in Spanish)
- Lugín, Alejandro Pérez (2008). La casa de la Troya (estudiantina). University of Santiago de Compostela. ISBN 978-84-9750-920-6.
- Matas, Ricart. Diccionario Biográfico de la Música. Ed. Iberia 1956 (in Spanish)* Sagarmínaga, Joaquín. Diccionario de Cantantes Líricos Españoles. Ed. Acento 1997 (in Spanish)
- VV. AA. Diccionario de la Música Española e Hispanoamericana. Ed. SGAE 1999 (in Spanish)
- Webber, Christopher (16 October 2002). The Zarzuela Companion. Scarecrow Press. ISBN 978-1-4616-7390-3.
