= Andrea Della Corte =

Italian musicologist

Andrea Della Corte was an Italian music historian and critic. Born in Naples on 5 April 1883, Della Corte studied law at the University of the native city, but was self-taught in music. After some short experiences in Neapolitan papers (initially at the Don Marzio, then at Il Mattino), he moved to Turin, where he was music critic for La Stampa from 1919 to May 1967. He brought the music journalism in Italy to a level of «professionalism hitherto unknown». In Turin, Della Corte also taught history of music, both at the Turin Conservatory (1926–53) and at the University of Turin (1939–53).

His main interests were the comic opera of the 18th century, Gluck and Verdi. Della Corte wrote many essays and articles, and 35 books, published both in Italy and abroad, many of them considered of fundamental importance for the modern musicology, characterised by a severe musical judgment and by the attempt to innovate the world of the Italian musical studies. He was a member of important musical and cultural institutions (Accademia dei Lincei, Accademia dei Cherubini in Florence, Accademia Nazionale di Santa Cecilia in Rome, Istituto Italiano per la Storia della Musica).

Della Corte died in Turin on 12 March 1968, aged 84. The city of Turin dedicated to Andrea Della Corte the music section of the Civic Library, to which his family, after his death, donated over 15,000 books.

== Works ==
- Paisiello: Settecento italiano - Turin, Fratelli Bocca, 1922
- L'opera comica italiana nel '700 : studi ed appunti - Bari, Laterza, 1923 (2 volumes)
- Le opere di Giuseppe Verdi. 1: Aida. Guida attraverso il dramma e la musica - Milan, Bottega di Poesia, 1923
- Le opere di Giuseppe Verdi. 2: Otello. Guida attraverso il dramma e la musica - Milan, Bottega di Poesia, 1924
- Nicolò Piccinni - Bari, 1928
- Scelta di musiche per lo studio della storia - Milan, Ricordi, 1928
- Disegno storico dell'arte musicale. Con esempi - Turin, Paravia, 1931
- La vita musicale di Goethe. Con ritratti e musiche - Turin, Paravia, 1932
- Canto e bel canto - Turin, 1933
- Le teorie delle origini della musica e le musiche dei popoli antichi o primitivi : tesi per gli allievi delle scuole musicali secondo i nuovi programmi governativi - Turin, Paravia, 1932
- Ritratto di Franco Alfano - Turin, 1935
- with Guido Pannain - Vincenzo Bellini : il carattere morale, i caratteri artistici - Turin, Paravia, 1935
- Un italiano all'estero: Antonio Salieri. Con 70 inedite citazioni musicali - Turin, Paravia, 1936
- Pergolesi - Turin, 1936
- Giuseppe Verdi - Turin, Arione, 1938
- Tre secoli di opera italiana - Turin, 1938
- Le relazioni storiche della poesia e della musica italiana: elementari notizie di storia della musica per il liceo classico e scientifico e per l'istituto magistrale - Turin, Paravia, 1940
- Rigoletto; il Trovatore; la Traviata di Giuseppe Verdi - Milan, Istituto d'alta cultura, 1943
- with Guido M. Gatti - Dizionario di musica. Illustrato con riproduzioni di oltre 80 ritratti e 70 istrumenti - Turin, Paravia, 1944
- Satire e grotteschi di musiche e di musicisti d'ogni tempo. Con caricature antiche e moderne e disegni di P. A. Gariazzo - Turin, UTET (Unione Tipografico-Editrice Torinese), 1946
- Gluck e i suoi tempi - Florence, Sansoni, 1948
- L'interpretazione musicale e gli interpreti - Turin, UTET (Unione Tipografico-Editrice Torinese), 1951
- with Guido Pannain - Storia della musica - Turin, UTET (Unione Tipografico-Editrice Torinese), 1952 (3 volumes)
- Toscanini visto da un critico - Turin, ILTE (Industria Libraria Tipografica Editrice), 1952 (reprint: Arturo Toscanini - Pordenone, Studio Tesi, 1981)
- with Marziano Bernardi - Gli strumenti musicali nei dipinti della Galleria degli Uffizi - Rome, ERI-Edizioni Radio Italiana, 1952
- with Alpheus Hyatt Mayor, Mercedes Viale and Anton Giulio Bragaglia - Tempi e aspetti della scenografia - Rome, ERI-Edizioni Radio Italiana, 1954
- with Guglielmo Barblan - Mozart in Italia - Milan, Ricordi, 1956
- Tutto il teatro di Mozart - Roma, ERI-Edizioni Radio Italiana, 1957
- Drammi per musica dal Rinuccini allo Zeno - Turin, 1958
- La critica musicale e i critici - Turin, UTET (Unione Tipografico-Editrice Torinese), 1961
