= Teatro Pavón =

Theatre in Madrid, Spain

Coordinates: 40°24′36″N 3°42′23″W

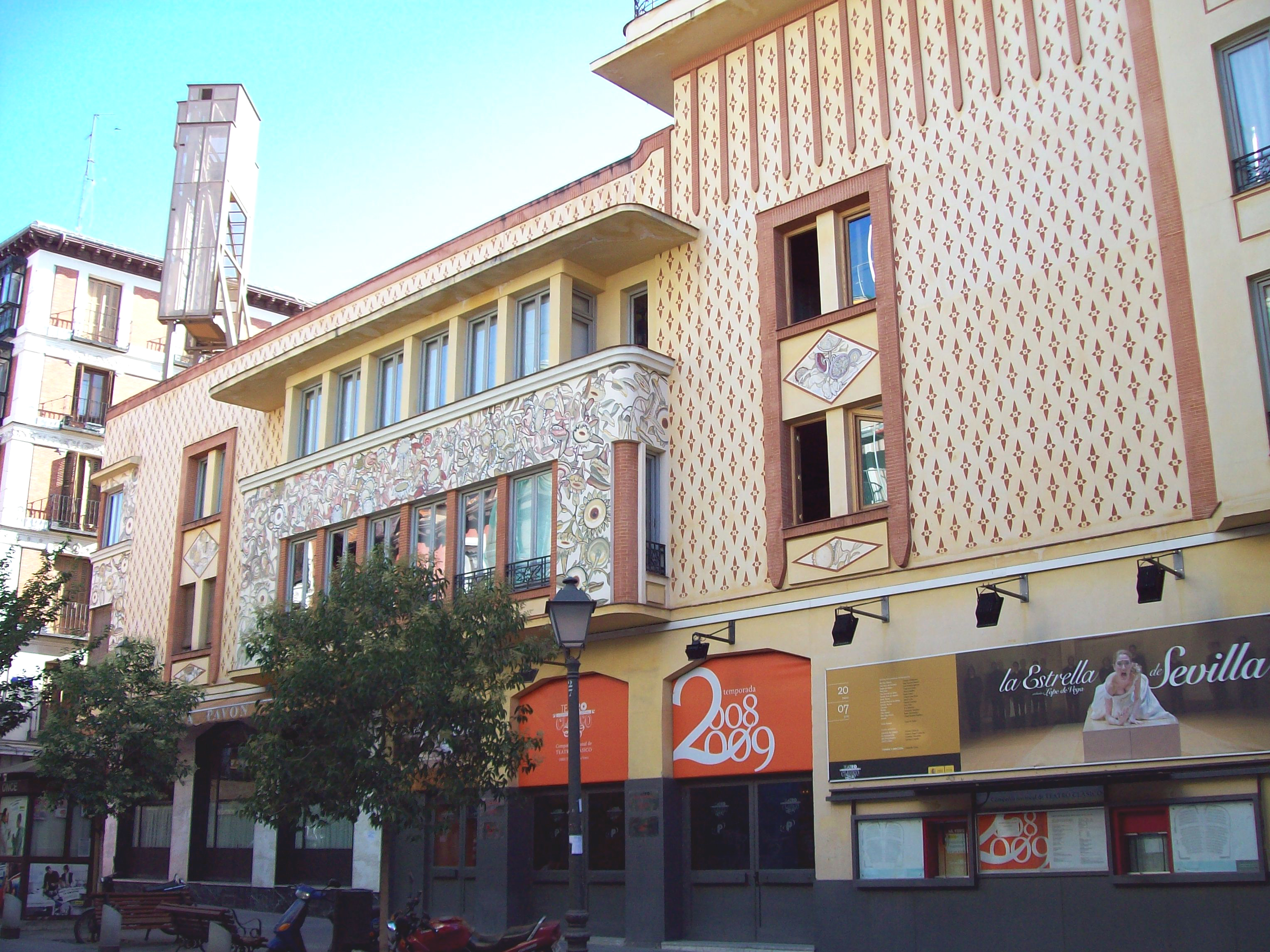
Teatro Pavón

The Teatro Pavón, Calle de Embajadores 9, is a theatre in Madrid opened in 1925. The architect was Teodoro de Anasagasti .

== Notable premieres ==
- Francisco Alonso's zarzuela Las Leandras - 12 November 1931
