= Antonia García de Videgain =

Spanish singer and actress

Antonia García
- Also known as: "La García", "Como la García no hay ninguna ", "La dama de Cádiz"
- Born: Antonia García Fernández-Gúzman; April 8, 1850; Cádiz, Spain
- Origin: Cádiz, Spain
- Died: June 25, 1924 (aged 74) Madrid, Spain
- Genres: Comedy, Zarzuela
- Occupations: Singer, actress
- Instrument: voice
- Years active: 1862–1918

Antonia García Fernández-Gúzman de Videgain (April 8, 1850 – June 25, 1924) was a Spanish singer and actress.

== Biography ==
=== Early life ===
Antonia García was born in the working-class district of Cádiz, Spain, the oldest of three children, including Micaela García. She was descended from the House of Medina Sidonia of Cadiz through one of its branches in the south of Spain. She began singing at school. Although her parents supported her talent, they did not think it was in keeping with the family's noble origins. She was supported in secret by her paternal uncle, who always believed in her talent. At age 15 she participated in a Zarzuela company and sang traditional songs. She was put in contact with influential musicians of her time, and at festivals she met people like Ruperto Chapí and Gerónimo Giménez.

=== Career ===
García's powerful voice was an asset at a time when there were no microphones, but only in her later years was she able to make a few recordings. Nevertheless, she made her name in the 1860s, and remains known as a result of being widely featured in both the Spanish and Latin American press. In 1894 in Buenos Aires she appeared as Doña Rita in La Verbena de la Paloma.

She was later declared an adopted daughter of Buenos Aires, where a street was named in her honor. Her career spanned more than 50 years, from a role in a Zarzuela at the age of 12 until her retirement. She married very young, to a singer and actor from Málaga, Don Salvador Videgain Gómez, with whom she had two children. She retired in 1908 from the theater industry but, in 1914, as a result of the misfortune of the fire of the Teatro Arriaga of Bilbao, she made the decision to re-launch her career briefly as a singer, mainly in festivals.

=== Death ===
García had suffered from diabetes since the late 1880s, which caused her to cancel some appearances. In 1918 she was diagnosed with severe diabetes; she died in her house in Madrid on June 25, 1924, and her remains are in the Cementerio de la Almudena in Madrid, in the same block as other famous artists of her time.

Her style has influenced many female tango singers in Argentina, as well as many famous Spanish flamenco singers. She was a pioneer in international travel, having toured Brazil, Cuba, Argentina, and Uruguay. For her work as a recording artist, García entered the Paseo de las Luminarias in the city of Cuba, among many other places, and was "godmother" to a ship named after her.

== Famous works and songs ==
- 1866: Flores y abrojos.
- 1867: Café-teatro-restaurant cantante.
- 1872: El barón de la castaña.
- 1873: Abel y caín first work of Chapí, La copa de plata, Lola, César y Bruto, El último figurín: song Canción de Funny, Un viaje de mil demonios, Robinson.
- 1874: Empleo desconocido, Dos leones, El número siete, El gato en la ratonera.
- 1875: Amores del otro mundo, La catedral de Colonia, La epístola de San Pablo, El grumete, Marina, Un pleito, Las nueve de la noche, Entre el alcalde y el rey of master Emilio Arrieta, Los baños del Manzanares.
- 1876: Cuatro sacristanes, El relampago, El barberillo de Lavapiés, Azulina, A los toros, El pájaro verde.
- 1877: Eh! a la plaza!, La soiré de Cachupín, Una jaula de locos, Bonito país of Tomás Bretón.
- 1878: Una tiple de café, El tío caniyitas, La soiré de cachupín.
- 1879: La salsa de Aniceta, Entre dos tíos, El lucero del alba of Fernández Caballero great winners hers.
- 1880: Música clásica song "Yo no quiero que me lleven a los toros de Sevilla", La esquina del suizo, Prestón y company.
- 1881: Anda Valiente of Asenjo Barbierí, Nada entre dos platos of Chapí.
- 1883: I comici tronati, Currilla, El gran Turco, Torear por lo fino, Un capitán de lanceros, Meterse en Honduras song "Una paloma blanca se lleva al alba", Música del porvenir, Enredos y compromisos.
- 1884: Los bandos de villafrita she song "Song of Liberata", La perla de Triana, Quién más mira, Ida y vuelta.
- 1885: Las grandes figuras of Manuel Fernández Caballero, Mi pesadilla, Los diablos del día, Escenas de verano, La sevillana, Quien fuera ella, La florentina, Frutos coloniales.
- 1886: El domingo gordo of Ruperto Chapí, Los incansables, Cambio de clases.
- 1887: Libertad de cultos, Lista de compañía, Venir por lana, La velada de Benito, Las tres gracias.
- 1888: Château Margaux, El Laurel de oro, La noche del 31, Los sobrinos del capitán Grant, La gran vía.
- 1889: El año pasado por agua song "Acurrucaditos bajo el paraguas", Boulanguer, Los pájaros del amor de Antonio Reparaz, La chiclanera.
- 1890: La noche del 31, La calandría.
- 1892: Guerra europea, Mañana será otro día, Meterse en Honduras.
- 1893: Azucena (comedy), Los hijos de Elena.
- 1894: La verbena de la Paloma of Bretón.
- 1895: El naufragio del vapor María.
- 1896: Los automatas, El padrino del nene, El baile de Luis Alonso, Las mujeres.
- 1897: El bigote rubio, La guardia amarilla, Gigantes cabezudos, El tambor de granaderos, La chavala, La viejecita, El cochero.
- 1897: El mantón de Mánila, Una vieja de capirote, El candidato, El cabo primero.
- 1898: El Portfolio de Eldorado, La batalla de Tetúan, La fiesta de San Antón, Pepe gallardo.
- 1900: Tenorio en Napóles of master Antonio Videgain, La balada de la luz, (opereta), La noche de la tempestad.
- 1901: El barbero de Sevilla, Gimnasio modelo, Bocanegra, La noche de reyes, La señora capitana.
- 1902 Juicio oral, El número 13.
- 1904: La casita blanca, El organista de Móstoles, El guitarrico, El abuelito, El juicio oral, El pobre valbuena, Bohemios, La reina mora, Lola Montes.
- 1905: El túnel, La corría de toros, El terrible Pérez, El santo de la Isidra.
- 1906: La alegría de la huerta, El primer reserva, El mal de amores, Alma de dios.
- 1907: La gatita blanca, El pollo Tejada, El rey que rabio.
- 1914: El primer rorro.
