= Salvador Videgain =

Salvador Videgain García
- Videgain in 1932
- Born: 26 February 1886; Madrid, Spain
- Died: 12 October 1947 (aged 61); Madrid, Spain
- Education: High School of Business of Madrid
- Alma mater: Academy of business
- Occupations: actor; singer; dancer; director; producer
- Years active: (1902–1947)
- Children: 5
- Relatives: Salvador Videgain Gomez (father), Antonia García de Videgain (mother)
- Musical career
- Instruments: Vocals; claque
- Label: Odeon Records

Salvador Videgain García (26 February 1886 – 12 October 1947) was a Spanish author and theatrical actor, director and producer. He was known for performing comedic and zarzuela roles in Spain and the Américas during the first half of the 20th century. He was born in Madrid, where he also died. He was the son of singers and actors Salvador Videgain Gómez and Antonia García.

== Biography ==
Salvador Videgain García had heritage from the Basques, Andaluces and Irish. He popularized the following actors in theatre: Ángel de Andrés, Celia Gámez, Rafaela Aparicio, José Álvarez 'Lepe', Teresita Silva, Raquel Daina.

The Videgain family had a long history in Spanish theatre. He debuted in the arms of his parents in 1886, first with Water Last Year (1889), In the time that because this was categorized as frivolous fame got overwhelmed launch the genre of the magazine, which then was imitated much especially after the theater season Martín. But never forgot his beginnings in the zarzuela and was the creator of possibly the anthologies of zarzuela and 4 monster program works in a day. Among his family, two sons were dedicated to acting intermittently, one came up to have the card professional. This family did not want to continue the saga of actors because there is a tradition that does not want to stop working on this craft a successor due to the tragic vicissitudes suffered the same in this work. Sin But there is a family successor in a variant of this job, as a writer is Juan José Videgain, a Spanish writer, is a descendant of him.

The history of the past of his Videgain family is clearly of gentlemen who went down in the Spanish reconquest to take areas of the kingdom of Málaga-Granada towards the fifteenth century, being the Basque branch of that time that had recognized the lineage nobility, but it was during the different centuries when they were connecting with different relevant Andalusian lineages such as the Vilches, the Garcia, the Molina or the Guzmán, making this very particularly different and diverse in genealogy to those of other branches of the same last name that did not descend to it.

=== Works, the first phase (1900–1909) ===
Videgain from small felt the call of family art. Debuted in the arms of his parents in 1886, then intervene in children's performances, first with water last year (1889), yet he dated his debut to an unexpected event, Salvador was studying for trade expert, when he got a substitution of a leading actor, the character was "anchor" of The Fist of Roses Ruperto Chapí, and this led to a significant career in the Spanish theatrical world. Without knowing it, because at the time of his early performance art was confusing, as a theater director would conduct the initial success of what would be called after the musical comedy in the early 20th century. In its early years, the early twentieth century, with the help of their parents start acting in a few roles as a substitute against eventualities actor with repertory works like The Fist of Roses, Giants, Rogues jealousy, The white house, The Feast of San Anton, The Ballad of light, The Barber of Seville, The unruly, The saint of the Isidra ... Then after the death of his father, continues to support his mother and brother of the famous master, Antonio Videgain in many provinces such as Cordoba, Barcelona, Bilbao, Zaragoza, Burgos and Alicante premiered his first works at the national level: the tunnel, heaven and earth, The girl's temple, Nido galante, La patria chica, the girl's boyfriend, and gets The huertanica go make a name as a comic tenor.

=== The second stage "The launch of the Star" (1909–1919) ===
After making a name as a comic actor in the provinces and having his first company, will begin in 1909 engaged in the Teatro de la Zarzuela in works such as chopping, Bohemians, The Horseman of the guard and the brand new club single by Pablo Luna a disastrous event occurs one night in November, after he kicked last night by the absence of a soprano, someone with a cigarette caused the fire most important of the genre, the theater is completely obliterated and only save the rooms of some artists and these by and have completed their trabajo.

De there will be recruited for the Grand Theatre where the comedy begins to create music with titles like The Riviera, The soul of love, The white deer, The poet of life, or magazine with the fairyland all in (1910). Apollo Theater in Madrid triumphed in the genre of zarzuela in the 1910–1911–1912 and 1913 seasons. The titles speak for themselves: The trust of philanderers José Serrano, The car of the devil, Gloria in excelsis, The fate of Isabelita, For peteneras, Blood and Sand by Pablo Luna, The boy in the cafeteria of Rafael Calleja Gómez, Barbarossaof Sinesio Delgado, Anita Amadeo Vives's cheerful, lily among thorns drama Gregorio Martínez Sierra, La Romerito 1912 Paul Luna, El Goya fresco, The Daughters of Lemos, Cadets Queen Cuisine, The Tale dragon castizo Child, The musical lothario, Don Juan Women's, sing Mills, Brook, La Cocagne, Latino muses Manuel Penella, The joy of love, The new capital testamento. Curiosamente makes no room so many new players and began a tour ending in Spain, which lasts several years settling in Barcelona and Valladolid while maintaining his professional reputation until his next significant engagement.

=== The third stage "as a great recognition of the scene" (1919–1936) ===
Martín achieved in the theater make great 1919–1920–1921–1922–1923 full seasons. Even the titles speak for themselves as large musical genre and revista. The corsair (1919), The Fall of the late (1920s), The perfect wife of Francisco Alonso, Linnet Courting (1921), Eye for an Eye, The Jewish capricious, The pretty haggard, Sanatorium of love, The great Pasha (1922), Venus in Chamberí, Women's body, The rush of pure, Dumb Time, The wedding gift (1923), Cabinet model, Present arms, The Land of the stars, The pool of Buddha (1923) by Vicente Lleo Balbastre. In the 1920s, he achieved considerable success as a director and comic actor, especially after the bombing achieve gender starting to reach frivolous life is friendly, The Venetian Antonio Paso Díaz (1925), To brave love, The Garden of touch (1926), Date Night (1927), Aligui, Daddy doll, The Raja of Cochin and Punishes (1928) even helping out the careers of Celia Gámez. In the thirties continues with alternating successes genres in works such as carnations, The Severe released in Portugal, Beautiful women and Key (1933), The Founding Fathers (1935), The eager Pablo Luna (1935), which consolidate its reputation in both genders and revista. La zarzuela will take you through the theaters in northern Morocco and Andalusia in 1935–1936 premiering works such as The bunch of roses, Katie both of Pablo Sorozábal.

=== The fourth stage "Sustaining the opera" (1936–1947) ===
For years, Salvador has been preserving a genre like zarzuela—a typically Spanish genre—that is in serious crisis. As director of several opera premieres in Madrid, some during the Spanish Civil War, such as Rosa de Triana (1937), The bell-ringer, Where are you going with shawl? (1938), Bartolo's Flute 1939. During the forties, the zarzuela was in a time of crisis. It is also when he found success in magazines and musical comedies, in works such as The arms and take, The Eye in Black, Women of Fire, Honeymoon in Cairo and My heart Ladybug Lady premiered in Barcelona (1943) as director of the company of Francisco Alonso and actor and director in the company of Luis Sagi-Vela with the comedy musical Qué sabes tú (1944). As for the zarzuela, it achieved success in the company of Pedro Terol and Matilde Vázquez, Alhambra (1940), The house of the three girls, Real Artemio as Lily ivory, Como lirio de marfil (1945). As director of the company premiere of Elio Guzman witches dance together with Aníbal Vela La danza de las brujas (1942), The gypsy painter (1943) and Serranía (1944). The company (1947) toured through the cities of Zaragoza, Valladolid and Palencia, with an extensive repertoire of works, premiering the zarzuela The guitar of Aragón. A notable engagement in the 1940s was as director of the company of maestro Manuel López-Quiroga Miquel in the theater Alcalá of Madrid (1941), which premiered Ugly Queen, Divine rebellion, and The black cat with Pepita Embill and Plácido Domingo Ferrer. He was almost twice the company's director of Madrid's Calderon Theater. He premiered at the Teatro Eslava with Maurice Chevalier's operetta The Love Parade (1942) with Antonio Middle and Pepita Embil. The second began in the summer of 1946, leaving the Calderon Theater in Madrid and Salamanca, where he led for the first time the Gran Vía theater, Seville, Gibraltar, Granada, Alicante, Zaragoza...

In 1947 He triumphed for Spain with his own company of zarzuela in the tour Zaragoza, Briviesca, Valladolid... After stopping to take a break and reform the company in October he became ill unexpectedly dying on the birthday of his second son, Manuel. The good Madrid society was able to go to his funeral in the sacramental of Almudena. All the Spanish press picked up the sad news of his death because of what it meant for the world of the scene and his fans.

== Filmography ==
Films of Salvador Videgain
Year	Title	Role	Director
1935	Nobleza baturra	baturro	Florián Rey
1941	Stowaway on Board	Alcalde	Florián Rey
1941	La famosa Luz María	Artist	Fernando Mignoni
1942	El abanderado	Heliodoro	Eusebio Fernández Ardavín
1942	The Wheel of Life	El Fotógrafo / Bernardito	Florián Rey
1944	Orosia	Judge Don Alonso	Florián Rey
1944	El rey de las finanzas	Alcalde	Ramón Torrado
1945	A los pies de usted	Mayordomo	Manuel Augusto García Viñolas

== Discography ==
Title	Year	Notes
The Perfect Wife	1920	Part (Portuguese fado) to the Odeon Records.
The Pure Trouble	1921	for the Odeon.
Pretty girls	1933	remastered to CD by Sonifolk in the 1990s.

== Titles of works as a writer and author ==
As a librettist and playwright who collaborated known in most of his works with Juan Ortuño and part of the music with Manuel López-Quiroga Miquel.

Title	Authors	Year	Theatre
The braid of Aphrodite	S. Videgain & Espeitia	1915	T. Nuevo (Barcelona).
The triumph of Cañete	Juan Ortuño & S. Videgain	1915	T. Cómico (Barcelona).
The monumental	Juan Ortuño & S. Videgain	1916	T. Cómico (Barcelona).
Happy festival!	S. Videgain	1922	T. Martín (Madrid).
The Cave of Wonders	S. Videgain	1923	T. Duque (Sevilla).
The red sign	Fernando Márquez Tirado & S.V. and M. López-Quiroga	1924	T. Duque (Sevilla).
Life is kind	S. Videgain & Manuel López-Quiroga Miquel	1925	T. Muñoz Seca (Madrid).
Red Light	S. Videgain & Manuel López-Quiroga Miquel	1926	T. Cisne (Madrid).

== See also ==
- House of Guzmán
- El renacer, documental film 2019.
