= Antonio Videgain =

Spanish conductor and composer

- Born: Antonio Videgain García; 10 March 1869; Jerez, Andalucia, Spain.
- Died: 9 February 1944 (aged 74); América
- Occupations: musician, composer, director, producer, businessman
- Years active: 1884–1944
- Spouse: Virgilia Reparaz (1867–1938)
- Children: Antonio Videgain Reparaz

Antonio Videgain García (10 March 1869 – 9 February 1944) was a Spanish conductor and composer, who dedicated his career to writing zarzuelas, such as A vuelo de pájaro and El vals coqueto.

== Biography ==
Although the details of his early years are not entirely certain, Videgain was born in Jerez and spent his childhood and adolescence in Madrid. He began music lessons with his father and continued his education with Ruperto Chapí and Tomás Bretón. By the age of 12, he was already playing among the first violins of the Teatro Principal orchestra in Cádiz. Thirteen years later, he became the director of an operette (musical) and zarzuela company, making his debut in Gibraltar with a production of Jerónimo Giménez.

A scholarship permitted Videgain to enrol at the Conservatoire, where he received the first prize for harmony and counterpoint. After graduation, he traveled to Argentina and then returned to Spain, settling in Madrid. In 1892 he was born Antonio Videgain Reparaz his son, was a famous singer of zarzuela in Argentina, Uruguay, Panama and Chile and sang in EEUU (Puerto Rico) in the 1930s. In 1899, he was named director of Teatro Romea de Murcia, and shortly afterwards, of the Teatro de la Zarzuela.

Ruperto Chapí commissioned him to write the openings to his zarzuelas, but they are lost. As a conductor of the Sociedad de Conciertos de Cadiz, Videgain helped cultivate the tastes of audiences in Cadiz for symphonic music. According to "those who have seem him conduct and have transmitted to us the memory of his performances of great strength and great enthusiasm. he obtained with imperceptible gestures what he wanted from the orchestra." Videgain also collaborated with the leading authors of sainetes (a comic genre found in Spanish theatre), including Salvador Videgain Gómez, Antonio Reparaz, the Quintero brothers, Joaquín Arqués, and Rafael Calleja, also writers to obtain the libretti for his zarzuelas. He co-wrote the music of a number of his works with others conductor, who hailed him the "musician of impossible" because of his sense of rhythm and easy melodies.

He died in Argentina.

== Works ==
In 1895, he wrote A vuelo de pájaro, based on a text by Enrique de María, journalist-director of The Fogón Buenos Aires, and in december of 1898, El vals coqueto in San Sebastián. Following the success of this piece, he set to music another sainete with the same characters, which became one of his most famous works: Buscando compañia in 1907 in Segovia, Películas nacionales or La gran apoteosis in theathre Ayala of Badajoz in 1917. This work was played around Spain and visited cities such as Alicante, Oviedo, Toledo, Murcia, Salamanca, Badajoz, Avila, Cádiz and Málaga.

But he was lost his wife Virgilia Reparaz, daughter great master of opera, Antonio Reparaz.

He travelled to Argentina in the 1890s with zarzuelas, not returning to Spain before 1906. He later returned to Argentina where he died.

The best known works he conducted were Molinos de Viento, La alegría del batallón, La mazorca roja,La borracha, La reja de la Dolores, La tempranica, Doloretes, La revoltosa, El amigo melquiades, El pollo tejada, El famoso Colirón, El cabo Pinocho, Las mujeres, El mundo comedia es o el baile de Luis Alonso, and De vuelta del vivero .

== Last years ==
Towards the end of his life, he lived in a precarious economic situation due to the Second World War. But he could alleviate it by obtaining the position of a church musician. He did not die in poverty as he received part of the inheritance from his parents' farm in the best neighborhood of Madrid.

== Notes and references ==
- La auténtica vida e historia del teatro (2005), Juan José Videgain book biography.
- El teatro 15-27 vols. (1902).
- Date of company Antonio Videgain UNED www.uned.es/centro-investigacion-SELITEN@T/pdf/signa/2.pdf
- Lybrary national of Uruguay www.periodicas.edu.uy/o/Revista_Biblioteca_Nacional/pdfs/Revista_Biblioteca_Nacional_a1_n1_1966.pdf
- Dates of company Antonio Videgain in Cervantesvirtual
- El heraldo de Madrid (1888-1926).
- El país (1890-1926).
- La españa artística (1888-1910).
- El adelanto de Salamanca (1899).
- Eco de Cartagena (1896-1922).
- Poliestemia https://books.google.com/books?id=sqTjOn15WBQC&dq=antonio+videgain&pg=PA105
- https://books.google.com/books?id=keWZAAAAIAAJ&q=antonio+videgain
- Alacant https://books.google.com/books?id=0lldAAAAMAAJ&q=antonio+videgain
- https://books.google.com/books?id=I-yA8DWEProC&q=antonio+videgain
- Teatralerias, tres siglos de la escena, (2018) Madrid: P & V, ISBN 9781724872289 biography of him.
