= Teatro Apolo (Madrid) =

Former theatre in Madrid, Spain

Coordinates: 40.4191°N 3.6962°W

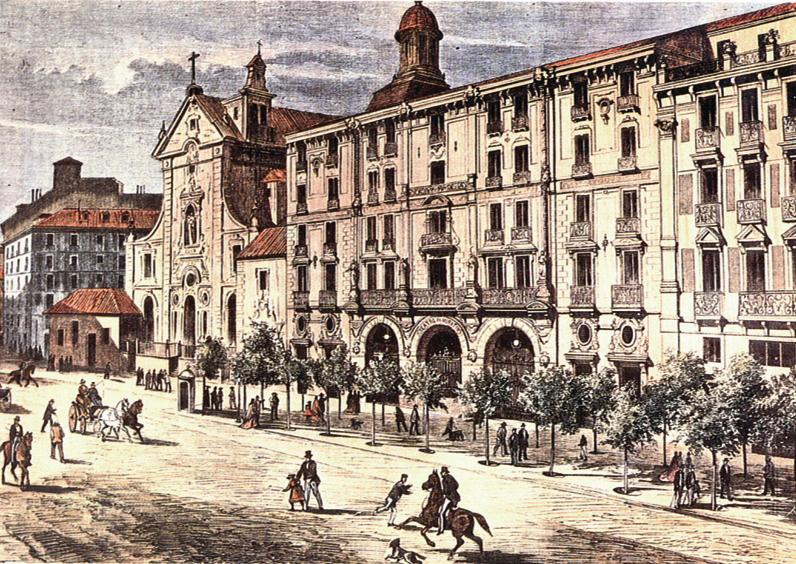
- Address: Calle de Alcalá 45; Madrid; Spain
- Capacity: 2,200

Construction
- Built: 1871–73
- Opened: 23 March 1873
- Closed: 30 June 1929
- Architect: P. Chauderlot; F. Festau

Teatro Apolo is a defunct theatre in Madrid, Spain.

== Location ==
It was located on Calle de Alcalá, at the site which is now number 45. Previously, the site was occupied by the Convento de San Hermenegildo, which was sold off in 1836 and demolished in 1870.

== History ==
Theatre construction occurred between 1871 and 1873, with a design by the French architects P. Chauderlot and F. Festau. It had a capacity of 2,500 people. The theatre opened on 23 March 1873 and featured the company of actor Manuel Catalina. A comedy playhouse, it went through difficult times in its early days due to its relative distance from the then city center and the high ticket price. The Apolo and the Felipe theatres were the most important venues for the género chico, a phenomenon which debuted in Madrid and featured one-act performances. The Apolo closed its doors on 30 June 1929 after it was purchased by Banco Bilbao Vizcaya Argentaria, which demolished the theatre in order to construct its Madrid headquarters. The site now contains a building which houses the Department of Finance and Administration of the City of Madrid. The Apolo's owners went on to build the Teatro Nuevo Apolo.
