= Los diamantes de la corona =

Zarzuela by Francisco Asenjo Barbieri and Francisco Camprodón

- Zarzuela by Francisco Asenjo Barbieri
- Librettist: Francisco Camprodón
- Language: Spanish
- Based on: Les Diamants de la couronne by Daniel Auber, Eugène Scribe and Jules-Henri Vernoy de Saint-Georges
- Premiere: 15 September 1854; Teatro del Circo, Madrid

Los diamantes de la corona is a zarzuela in three acts by the composer Francisco Asenjo Barbieri with a libretto by Francisco Camprodón. The opera is taken from the original French libretto by Eugène Scribe and Jules-Henri Vernoy de Saint-Georges which was set to music by Daniel Auber in 1841. Barbieri's work was first performed at the Teatro del Circo in Madrid on 15 September 1854.

Auber's work retained popularity at the Opéra-Comique from its première there in 1841 (receiving 180 performances in its first eight seasons), with over 370 performances up to the fire of 1887.

The dramatist and poet Francisco Camprodón Lafont, first declining the composers Joaquín Gaztambide and José Inzenga, offered his adaptation to Barbieri, who had already achieved his first major zarzuela success with Jugar con fuego in 1851, and was in the process of creating a new theatre in Madrid.

A recording was made at the Teatro Monumental Madrid in 1957 by Columbia, with Pilar Lorengar, María Dolores Alite, Ginés Torrano, Manuel Ausensi, Gerardo Monreal and Rafael Campos, with Ataúlfo Argenta conducting the Orquesta Sinfónica the Coros Cantores de Madrid. This was re-issued in 1997.

The work was staged in the Teatro de la Zarzuela Madrid in the 2009–10 and 2014–15 seasons, which transferred to Lisbon.

== Roles ==
| Role | Voice type | Premiere Cast, 15 September 1854 (Conductor: ) |
|---|---|---|
| Catalina (chief of the bandits) | soprano | Clarice Di-Franco |
| Diana | mezzo-soprano | Carolina Di-Franco |
| Marqués de Sandoval | tenor | Manuel Sanz |
| Rebolledo, deputy of Catalina | baritone | Joaquín López Becerra |
| Campomayor, minister | tenor | Vicente Caltañazor |
| Don Sebastián | tenor | Ramón Cubero |
Chorus: Bandits, courtiers, soldiers.

== Synopsis ==
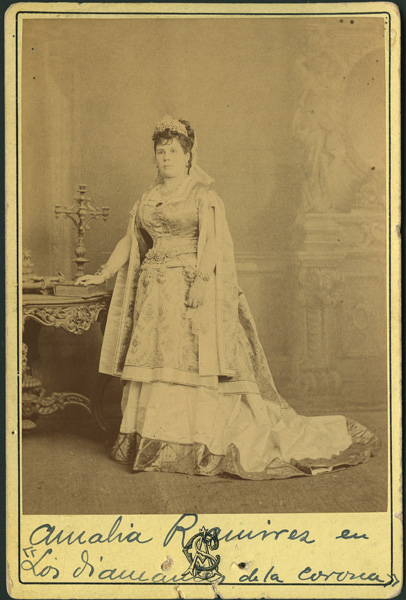
Amalia Ramírez

The action takes place in Portugal during 1777, in and around Coimbra in the first two acts and in Lisbon in the final act.

Queen Maria of Portugal (Catalina) has not yet come of age and the Conde de Campomayor is therefore her regent. To alleviate the poverty of the people, the queen decides to use the jewels of the royal collection to change into money, but secretly swapping the real jewels for fakes.

=== Act 1 ===
In the ruins of an old chapel, a counterfeiting ring are working busily. The Marquis de Sandoval, a Portuguese noble, comes upon the place after fleeing his carriage in the midst of a storm. Hearing voices he hides, and overhears a conversation involving Rebolledo, one of the bandits. Rebolledo had been saved from hanging by Catalina and she was made their chief.

The bandits discover the hidden Marques but Catalina appears. Her beauty strikes Sandoval, while his baggage is looted by the bandits who are ordered to return all to him except for a blank safe-conduct pass signed by Campomayor. Catalina sings her ballad.

Left alone he explains that he was travelling to visit his uncle, Campomayor to arrange the marriage with his cousin Diana. Catarina agrees to let him free, provided he swears not to let anyone know about his adventure for one year nor recognize her should they meet again.

Rebolledo sends to prepare a carriage for Sandoval to go, he afraid that something might happen to Catalina, but she assures him that all will be well. She warns the bandits that the Portuguese army is on their trail but they can move off using the stolen safe-conduct, with the case of jewels, disguised as the monks of San Huberto. The soldiers who have entered led by Don Sebastián pay respects to the departing 'monks'.

=== Act 2 ===
In a salon of the villa of Count Campomayor, his daughter Diana is talking with Sebastián, the captain in charge of arresting the bandits, about her impending marriage to her cousin Sandoval, saying that she does not want to proceed and that her affection is only for Sebastián. Campomayor comes in with Sandoval, oblivious to the plans for a big party where the contract for the marriage of Diana and Sandoval will be signed.

Guests enter, and a servant brings a message about a coach accident and the passengers asking for hospitality; the Count accepts while dealing with the guests. Posing as the Duchess of Albaflor and her servant, Catalina and Rebolledo enter elegantly dressed, provoking admiration of the guests. Catalina and Diana sing a bolero.

Sandoval recognizes the arrivals and tries to talk to her aside, declaring his love but Catalina openly rejects him because she knows about his impending marriage to Diana, which he denies. To prove his affection, he has a ring as a gift for her.

The news comes that the crown jewels have been stolen. Seeing a ring in the hands of Sandoval, Campomayor interrogates him about the owner, but he lies about Catalina. Diana has read the papers, and notes that the description matches Catalina. Sandoval implores their protection, reveals to her his love for Catalina, she takes the opportunity to ask him to surrender his hand in exchange for help to escape from the villa.

Campomayor returns accompanied by the clerk and the guests prepare to witness the marriage contract. Sandoval refuses to sign, to the amazement of the count. Learning that the Duchess has fled in a carriage he flies into a rage and sets a reward for their capture.

=== Act 3 ===
In the state room, the court awaits the coronation of the queen, although she has not yet chosen a consort. Sandoval receives Sebastián, admitted into the royal guard, and is surprised at the sudden appearance of the monarch and the preparations for the ceremony.

Sebastián is happy for the love of Diana and the events at the villa. Sandoval takes the opportunity to talk with Campomayor and make him see that Sebastián returns Diana's love. He accepts and plans to find the counterfeiters who had arrived at the palace last night.

Rebolledo enters, announced as a count, arousing the suspicions of Campomayor, who interrogates him about his origins and lineage. Rebolledo manages to confuse him until a bailiff arrives asking everyone to retire, since the queen has to speak to him alone.

Catalina reveals her motive of protecting the counterfeiters, to change the real jewels of the crown to false, and so to sell the real ones and get money to help the poor. Catalina questions the candidate husbands, but says that a nobleman who loves her is none other than Sandoval.

Campomayor tries to dissuade her, but she tells about the events at his villa and that if they find the thief, she will apply the law with all its power.

All the courtiers are waiting for the coronation and proclamation of the future consort. Catalina comes with the decision, Sebastián brings in Sandoval, who is shocked to see the Queen and recognize her as Catalina. She declares that Sandoval will be her future husband and she will guarantee the wedding of Diana with Sebastián, and forgive Rebolledo. The curtain falls with general joy and cheers to the queen.

== Musical numbers ==
Act 1

- Introducción y Coro de monderos: "Vuelta al trabajo, basta de holgar"
- Aria de Sandoval: "¡Qué estalle el rayo!"
- Balada de Catalina: "En la noche callada"
- Terceto de Catalina, Sandoval y Rebolledo: "No es tu prima la más bella"
- Act 1 Finale: "Pronto amigos, pronto amigos, ojo alerta"

Act 2

- Preludio (Orchestra)
- Coro de Damas y Caballeros: "Vuestra sien de angel, niña gentil"
- Concertante de Catalina, Diana, Rebolledo, Sandoval, Campomayor y Coro: "Niñas que a vender flores"
- Bolero a Dos: "Niñas que a vender flores"
- Dúo de Catalina y Sandoval: "¿Por qué me martirizas, linda morena?"
- Dúo de Sandoval y Diana: "Si a decirle me atreviera"
- Act 2 Finale: "Mil parabienes al orador"

Act 3

- Introduction: "¿Qué nuevas corren?
- Quintet of Diana, Campomayor, Sandoval, Don Sebastián, Rebolledo: "¡Ah!. ¡Qué miro!"
- Romanza de Catalina: "De qué me sirve"
- Coro y Marcha de la Coronación: "No se traslució"
- Finale: "¡Gloria a la reina de Portugal!"
