= José María Díaz =

Spanish journalist and playwright (1813–1888)

José María Díaz de la Torre (July 1813 – 13 November 1888) was a Spanish romanticist journalist, playwright, poet, and politician. His classic works are Julio César (1841), Lucio Junio Bruto (1844), Catilina (1856), and La muerte de César (1883). He also wrote under the pseudonym Domingo de Argote. He was also involved in the alta comedia.

== Biography ==
In July 1813, Díaz was born in Caracas, Captaincy General of Venezuela to Caracan doctor and journalist José Domingo Díaz and a Spanish mother. During his formative years he experienced the upheaval caused by the Spanish and Bolivarian forces in the Venezuelan War of Independence. In the summer of 1821, his family, due to his father's royalism, fled Caracas for Madrid, Spain, arriving in fall. In 1828, he joined the Real Colegio de Santo Tomás, studying philosophy and quickly began writing under his father's vocation. In 1830, he became acquainted with the artistic scene and the romanticists of El Parnasillo. Mariano Roca de Togores, 1st Marquess of Molins recalled that when convening at Café del Príncipe he was jokingly given by some the "antonomastic dictation of The Poet". By 15 May 1832, he may had been connected to Patricio de la Escosura. In 1835, he published some poems in newspapers and was involved in events with Mariano José de Larra, Ventura de la Vega, Manuel Bretón de los Herreros, and José de Espronceda; in 1835, he gained traction in the Madrid literary scene with his premiere dramas Elvira de Albornoz and Felipe II at the Teatro del Príncipe. On 17 February 1837, at Larra's funeral, he was among the speakers prior to José Zorrilla's famous speech. The following year Díaz published Un poeta y una mujer, a retelling of Larra's love and suicide.

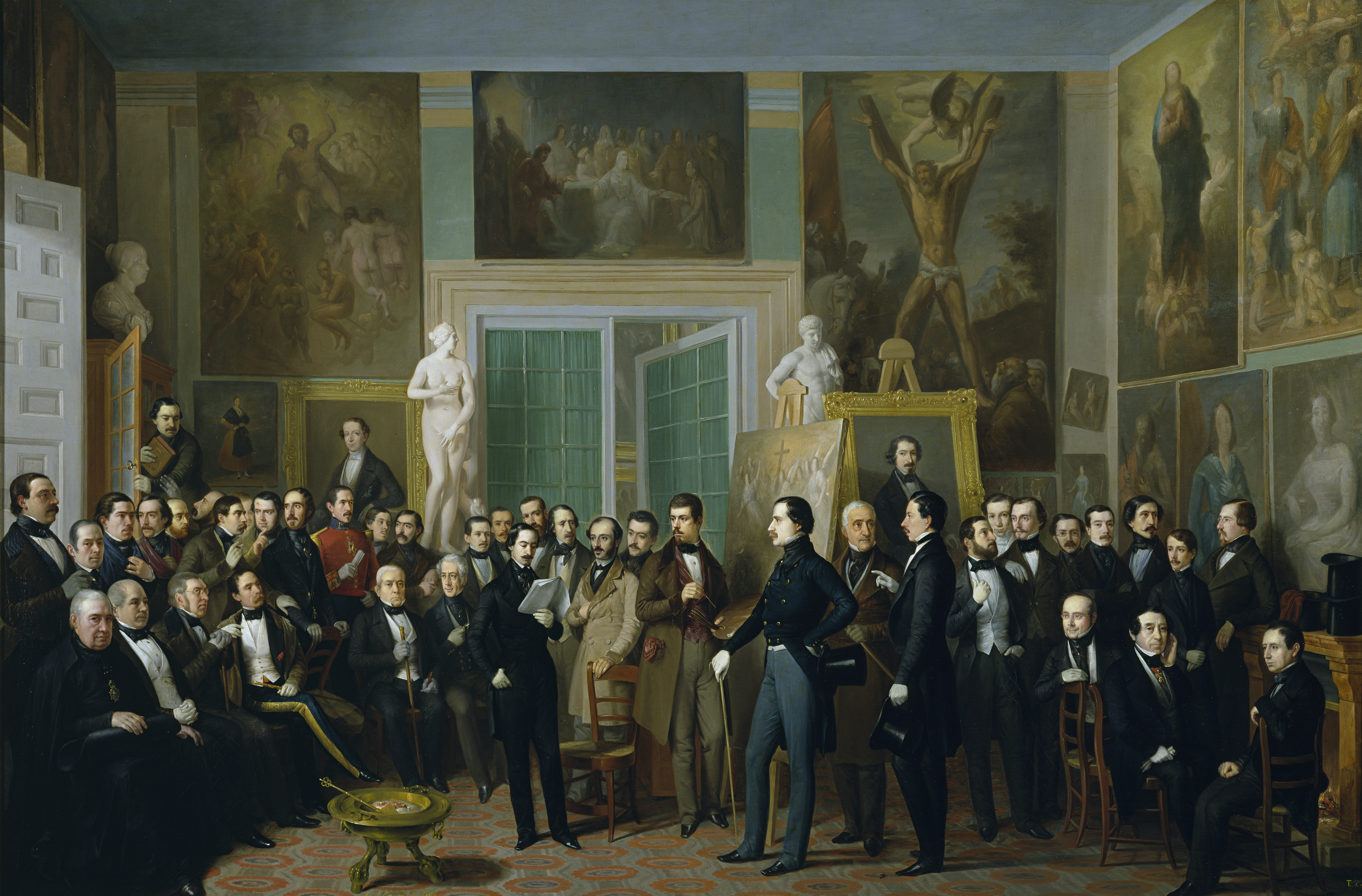
Díaz (bearded grasping shirt on right) in Los poetas contemporáneos by Antonio María Esquivel

He started his journalist career with the theatrical newspaper El Entreacto, and two years later, in Revista de Teatros, of which he became director. By 1840 he was friends with José de Salamanca and in 1843, was allowed to direct Salamanca's leased Teatro del Circo. The same year, Salamanca supported the foundation of Sociedad de Escritores Dramáticos, which Díaz was secretary of; its founding members included Díaz, Zorrilla, Bretón, Antonio Gil y Zárate, Juan Eugenio Hartzenbusch, Tomás Rodríguez Rubí, Antonio García Gutiérrez, Leopoldo Augusto de Cueto, Carlos García Doncel, Isidoro Gil y Baus, and Ramón Navarrete. By the end of the 1840s, Díaz was at the height of his playwright career. He helped Zorilla conclude Traidor, inconfeso y mártir, collaborated on a cuadro de costumbres in Los españoles pintados por sí mismos, and edited El Entreacto, directed Revista de Teatros, and collaborated in La Ortiga, possibly among others. He voiced his criticism in La Ortega and in 1849, particularly against Vega's commissionership at the Comisario Regio del Teatro Español.

In January 1851, he was made member of the Junta Consultiva de Teatros del Reino, losing the position upon its abolition nine months later. In July 1855, out of concern, he offered the lease for the Teatro de la Cruz and Teatro del Príncipe to the ayuntamiento; he became director of Príncipe in autumn 1856, remaining an entrepreneur until the beginning of 1858. In this decade he advocated propagating original works in Spanish as opposed to translations, a sentiment held throughout his life. Catilina (1856) was inspired by her portrayal in Bellum Catilinae by Sallust. He published articles in Museo de las Familias and in 1860, became editor of Fernando de Corradi's progressive El Clamor Público, taking over the literary section in 1863. He voiced political concerns such as the "hypocrisy" of the Catholic Church. However, since 1850 his positions became increasingly radical, eventually too much so for El Clamor and joined La Iberia. His expression of such views in his work led to their occasional censorship for "immorality"; works such as Luz en la sombra Beltrán, and Mártir siempre, nunca reo's representation were banned by theater censor Antonio Ferrer de Río. The worst instance was Río's censorship of Virtud y libertinaje in 1863, which was overturned by a court formed by Hartzenbusch, García Gutiérrez, and Juan Valera y Alcalá-Galiano, yet the Oviedo censor still restricted its representation, leading to intervention by the governor. In 1864, he was sentenced to nine years in prison for political articles published in that paper charged with lèse-majesté, quickly fleeing to Bayonne, Second French Empire, remaining there until the following year. As an influential member of the Progressive Party, he was secretary of the commission assigned to drafting the Manifiesto del Comité Central Progresista, which was signed on 20 November 1865.

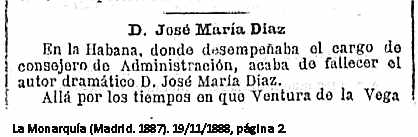
His death as reported in La Monarchia

In 1868, during the Sexenio Democrático, he was appointed by Captain General of Cuba Domingo Dulce as secretary of the Superior Government of Cuba, departing in November. He was dismissed upon the succession of Antonio Caballero y Fernández de Rodas in 1869, returning to Spain with Dulce and his cabinet. In August 1870, he was appointed civil governor of the Province of Manila. He was shortly after awarded the title Knight of the Order of Isabella the Catholic. In 1875, he was in Madrid again working with theater. In 1882, he was appointed councilor of the Litigation in the Council of Administration of Cuba. On 13 November 1888, he died in Havana, and two days later was interred into Colón Cemetery vault 1207.

== Published works ==
- Elvira de Albornoz, Madrid, Imprenta de Repullés, 1836
- Felipe II, Madrid, Miguel de Burgos, 1837
- Un poeta y una mujer, Madrid, Hijos de Doña Catalina Piñuela, 1838 (Madrid, 1849)
- Laura o la venganza de un esclavo, Madrid, Ignacio Boix, 1839 (Madrid, 1855)
- Baltasar Cozza, Madrid, Repullés, 1839
- Julio César, Madrid, Salvador Albert, 1841
- Translation of María Lescombat by Antony Béraud and Alphonse Brot, Revista de Teatros, 1842
- Lucio Junio Bruto, Madrid, Imprenta Nacional, 1844
- Una reina no conspira, Madrid, Marcos Bueno, 1844
- Jefté, Madrid, F. de Paula Mellado, 1845
- Juan sin Tierra, Madrid, Sociedad de Operarios del mismo Arte, 1848 (Madrid, 1863)
- Últimas horas de un rey, Madrid, S. Omaña, 1849 (Madrid, 1857)
- La reina Sara, Madrid, S. Omaña, 1849
- Andrés Chenier, Madrid, C. González, 1851
- Para vencer, querer, Madrid, C. González, 1851
- El héroe de Bailén, Díaz, Gertrudis Gómez de Avellaneda, Adelardo López de Ayala y Herrera, Eduardo Asquerino, Mariano Zacarías Cazurro, Gregorio Romero Larrañaga, Juan Ariza, Gabriel Estrella y Mantilla, Isidoro Gil y Baus, Madrid, Impr. a cargo de D. F. R. del Castillo, 1852
- ¡Redención!, Madrid, C. González, 1854 (Madrid, 1858; Salamanca, 1871)
- El Justicia de Aragón, Madrid, José Rodríguez, 1854
- ¡Creo en Dios!, Madrid, C. González, 1854
- Catilina, Madrid, José Rodríguez, 1856
- Las cuatro estaciones, Madrid, José Rodríguez, 1856
- Carlos IX y los Hugonotes, Madrid, José Rodríguez, 1856
- Carnioli, Madrid, Julián Peña, 1857
- Los dos cuáqueros, Madrid, Vicente de Lalama, 1858
- Marta y María, Madrid, Anselmo Santa Coloma, 1860
- Los tres banqueros, Madrid, Anselmo Santa Coloma, 1860
- Misterios del carnaval, Madrid, Vicente de Lalama, 1860
- La vuelta de presidio, Madrid, Anselmo Santa Coloma
- Luz en la sombra, Madrid, El Clamor Público, a cargo de D. Navarro y Fernández, 1861
- Gabriela de Vergy, Madrid, C. González, 1862
- Otro Tenorio humillado por la virtud, Madrid, Imprenta Española, 1863
- Mártir siempre, nunca reo, Madrid, Centro General de Administración, 1863
- El matrimonio de conciencia, Madrid, F. Martínez García, 1864
- Muerta en el bosque, Madrid, F. Martínez García, 1864
- Translation of Margarita Thieulay by Amédée Achard, Madrid, La Iberia, 1868
- Translation of Clementina Aubernin by Amédée Achard, Madrid, La Iberia, 1868
- Trece de febrero, Madrid, José Rodríguez, 1878
- La muerte de César, Havana, Imprenta del Gobierno y Capitanía General, 1883

== See also ==
- Barrio de las Letras
- Corrales de comedias of Madrid

== Sources ==
Bibliography

- Martín Puente, Cristina (1 January 2003). "La figura de César en las tragedias españolas del siglo XIX". Cuad. Fil. Clás. Estud. Lat. 23 (1): 227–248.
- González Subías, José Luis (1 January 2004). "Ventura de la Vega y José María Díaz: un enfrentamiento personal y literario". Servicio de Publicaciones Universidad de Navarra. Madrid: 199–210. ISSN 0213-2370.
