= Joaquín Gaztambide =

Spanish composer

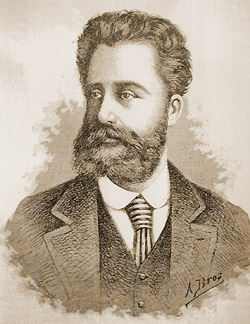
Joaquín Romualdo Gaztambide

Joaquín Romualdo Gaztambide y Garbayo (7 February 1822 in Tudela, Navarre – 18 March 1870 in Madrid) was one of the most prominent Spanish composers of zarzuela in the mid-nineteenth century. His contribution to the revival of the genre was highly significant; and although during the last century his work virtually disappeared from the Spanish musical scene, the early 21st century has reversed this trend. Of Italianate quality in the manner of Gaetano Donizetti, his music nonetheless makes use of Spanish rhythms and dance forms. Among other renowned works (many in opéra comique form), his La Mensajera (1849), El valle de Andorra (1851), El sueño de una noche de verano, Catalina (1854), Los magiares (1857), El juramento (1858), and the one-act classic Una vieja (1860) stand out.

== Biography ==
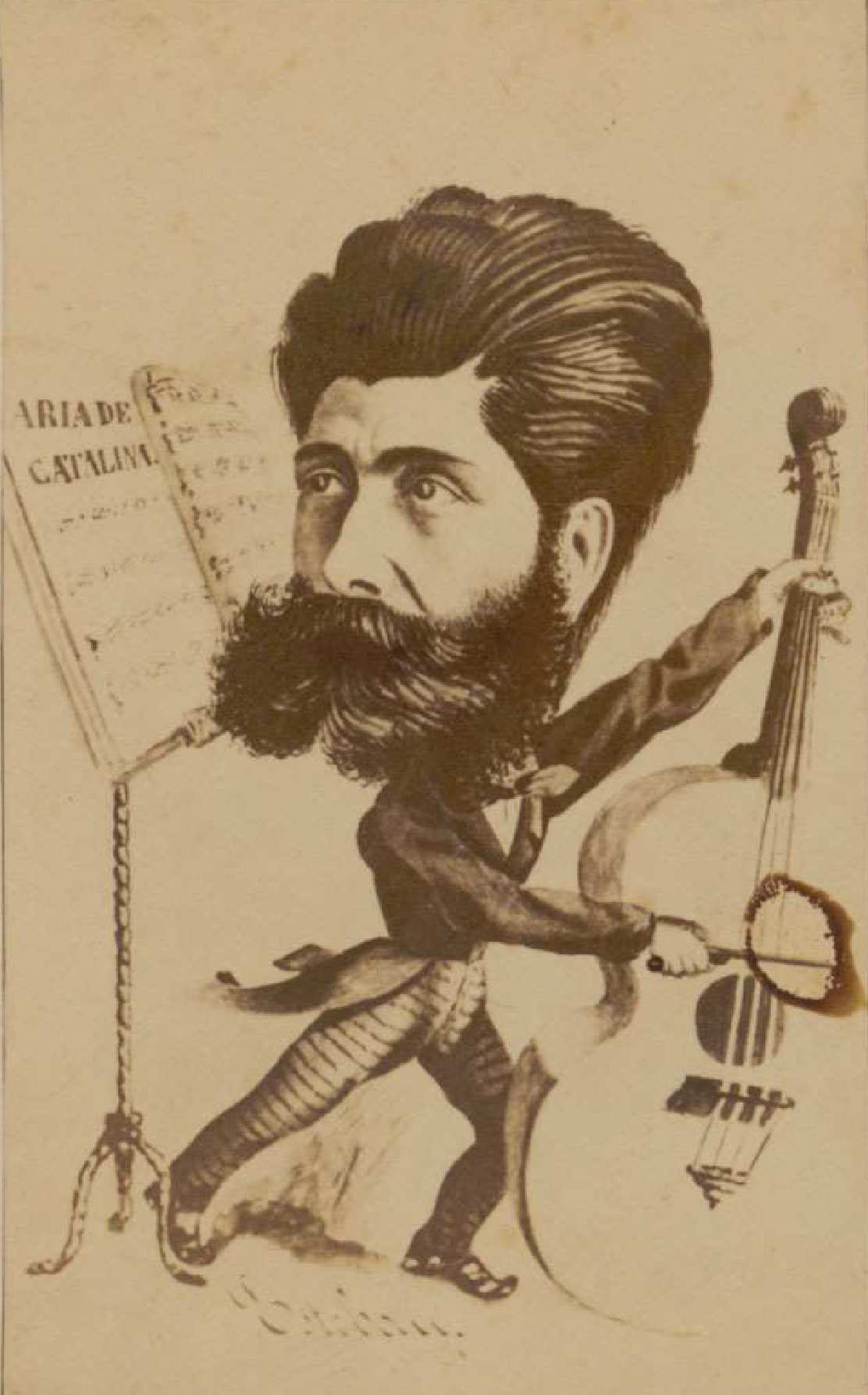
A caricature of Gaztambide with the score of Catalina, one of his most successful zarzuelas

Sent to Pamplona by his uncle to study piano and composition with Joseph Guelbenzu and Mariano Garcia, Gaztambide taught piano and played bass in the orchestra of a theater to make his living. He then moved to Madrid in 1842, where he studied at the Real Conservatório de Musica Maria Cristina, later continuing his studies of piano with Pedro Albéniz and composition with Ramon Carnicer.

In 1845, he became choirmaster of the Italian Company of Teatro de la Cruz with the help of his friend Francisco Salas. Two years later he traveled to Paris as conductor of a company of actors and dancers organized by the Spanish businessman Juan Lombía, despite not being successful in this tour. Back in Madrid in 1848, he receives a proposal from Baltasar Saldoni to become director of the orchestra at Teatro Español, where he conducted concerts with the participation of the famous violinist Antonio Bazzini.

In 1850, along with Rafael Hernando Palomar and Francisco Asenjo Barbieri, he directed the orchestra at Teatro Variedades, co-founding the Sociedad Artística Musical the following year to exploit the activities of Teatro del Circo as composer and conductor. In 1856, he entered another partnership in Barbieri's company of the newly opened Teatro de la Zarzuela in Madrid, for which he also became composer and conductor. From 1860 until 1862 he directed opera performances and the first big concerts in Spain, organized by the Sociedad Artístico Musical de Socorros Mutuos, co-founded by Francisco Asenjo Barbieri and Fernando Mosnasterio del Castillo on 24 June 1860.

On 19 December 1863, his La conquista de Madrid premiere at the Teatro de la Zarzuela, with libretto by Luis Mariano de Larra. In 1865, he was hired as conductor for the Teatro de los Campos Eliseos, in Madrid, in one of the first performances of the music of Richard Wagner. In 1868, he was appointed director and chairman of the Sociedad de Conciertos de Madrid, where the opera Tannhäuser premiered. The same year he toured Cuba with his own company and flew to Mexico because of a major revolt, returning to Spain in 1870 with serious health problems and financially ruined. He died as a result of severe liver disease shortly after arriving to Madrid.

== Zarzuelas (selective list) ==
Gaztambide composed 44 zarzuelas.

No.	Original title	English title	Acts	Librettist	Theater	First perf.
01	La mensajera	The Message Girl	2	Luis de Olona	Español	1849-12-24
06	Al amánecer	At the Dawn	1	Mariano Pina Bohigas	Circo	1851-05-08
07	Tribulaciones	Tribulations	2	Tomás Rodríguez Rubí	Circo	1851-09-14
08	Por seguir a una mujer	In Pursuit of a Woman	4	Luis de Olona	Circo	1851-12-24
09	El sueño de una noche de verano	A Midsummer Night's Dream	3	Patricio de la Escosura	Circo	1852-02-21
10	El estreno de una artista	The Premiere of a Performer	1	Ventura de la Vega	Teatro del Circo	1852-06-05
12	El valle de Andorra	The Valley of Andorra	3	Luis de Olona	Circo	1852-11-05
18	Catalina	Catalina	3	Luis de Olona	Circo	1854-10-23
25	Los magiares	The Hungarians	4	Luis de Olona	Zarzuela	1857-04-12
28	Un pleito		1	Francisco Camprodón	Zarzuela	1858-06-22
29	El juramento	The Oath	3	Luis de Olona	Zarzuela	1858-12-20
32	Una vieja	An Old Lady	1	Francisco Camprodón	Zarzuela	1860-12-11/14
39	Las hijas de Eva	The daughters of Eve	3	Luis Mariano de Larra	Teatro de la Zarzuela	1862-10-09
41	La conquista de Madrid		3	Luis de Olona	Zarzuela	1863-12-23

== See also ==
- José Inzenga
- Cristóbal Oudrid
