= Un pleito =

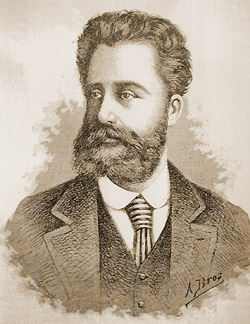
Composer Joaquín Gaztambide

Un pleito (A Lawsuit) is a one-act zarzuela by Joaquín Gaztambide for libretto (in verse) by Francisco Camprodón. Its first performance took place on 22 June 1858 at the Teatro de la Zarzuela in Madrid.

== Roles ==
Role	Voice type	Premiere cast, 12/22 June 1858
Don Severo, an Andalusian farmer	baritone	Francisco Salas
Don Carlos, his nephew, a young lawyer	tenor	José Salces
Santiago, an Asturian butler, of 50 years	bass	Francisco Calvet
Doña Cecilia, a ridiculous old woman, of 60 years	dama de carácter	Maria Soriano
Leonor, her niece, a distinguished youngster	soprano	Josefa Mora
A Servant	does not speak	

== Synopsis ==
The zarzuela depicts a moment in the mid-19th century. The scene presents a room in the house of Don Severo in Sevilla. His nephew Carlos, a young lawyer, spends all days writing verses to his beloved one, though Don Severo had promised he would kick him out if he does not find a job. The girl he loves moved to a neighbour house several days ago, and he wants to meet her. The action begins with Carlos trying to compose a poem. When his butler Santiago enters, it turns out he is a fellow countryman of the hosts of the neighbour house, and Carlos asks him to learn more about the girl. Left alone he sings a love song (No. 2). Santiago comes back and tells him that the girl came to the city with her aunt to take part in a lawsuit and that he managed to invite them to speak with Carlos, as they need a lawyer.

While Carlos goes to dress, enter the guests. Leonor finds out it is the same window opposite to hers from which a mysterious young man sings about love. The aunt lectures her about the importance of understanding the laws; but the girl does not consent with her and expresses romantic hopes (Nos. 3 and 3bis). They speak to Carlos, who pretends to be an experienced lawyer with many clients. Their case refers to an estate inherited by Leonor from her family without knowing about its debts. Suddenly appeared the creditor requiring them to pay or to pass the estate to him. He won the case, and now they intend to make and appeal, because they have uncovered a new advantageous document. Santiago assists the old woman find it in a bundle of papers, providing some time to Leonor and Carlos to express their feelings without Doña Cecilia seeing them (No. 4). Unable to find the document, the women decide to go home.

Now enters Don Severo. Carlos's creditors (an innkeeper, a perfumer, a tailor and so on) beset the threshold, which makes him, a severe Andulasian, to remind the nephew about the debts. The young man triumphantly says he is already occupied with a case. They decide to stage his speech for the trial: Don Severo performs the plaintiff and Santiago is the judge. When Carlos starts to expose the cunning of his opponent, Don Severo understands this is the very case about which he is litigating, and thus he is actually the real plaintiff. Frenzied with his nephew's accusations of cruelty, he suggests him to reject the case or perish with all his enormous debts; but Carlos can't betray Leonor (Nos. 5 and 5bis).

When Don Severo leaves, Santiago seeks to persuade his master: he should reject the case and marry Leonor, and the uncle would surely give them what they want. The women return just in time. Doña Cecilia has found the document in a dress her maid was going to wash: it is wet, but the text rests intact. Carlos informs the women that although he is the paintiff's nephew, he will do his best to defend their case. Don Severo comes back and reads the paper. He finds the signatures washed away, so that the document is not valid. Leonor gives up and tears the paper to pieces saying that his ambitions prove he needs it more. Touched with her generosity, he asks her to marry Carlos and promises the estate. The whole company stays satisfied.

== Musical numbers ==
- No. 1. Prelude
- No. 2. Canción. Yo tengo noche y día (Don Carlos)
- No. 3. Duo. Yo sé a no dudar (Leonor, Doña Cecilia)
- No. 3bis. Cavatina. Mi corazón que ríe y llora (Leonor)
- No. 4. Quartet. Una palabra sola (Leonor, Doña Cecilia, Don Carlos, Santiago)
- No. 5. Vito. Ay que aquel que no tiene hijos (Don Severo with Don Carlos and Santiago)
- No. 5bis. Crea usted, tio, que yo ignoraba (Don Carlos, Don Severo, Santiago)
