= Fermín María Álvarez =

Spanish composer

Fermín María Álvarez (Zaragoza, 1833 – Barcelona, 1898) was a Spanish lawyer, composer, and amateur pianist from the region of Aragon. He is famous for his compositions of música de cámara, or chamber music--especially for solo piano and for voice and piano--as well as for the salon gatherings he held, particularly on the Calle de Fuencarral, Madrid. He concentrated mainly on salon songs, which were often performed along with zarzuela excerpts by other composers.

== Biography ==
Although he was born in Zaragoza, his family moved to Palamós (Gerona) when he was a boy. There, he began regular musical training. At one point, he took a trip to Cuba, where he was able to meet musicians like Nicolás Ruiz Espadero and Teresa Carreño.

After his trip to Cuba, Álvarez moved and settled down in Madrid, where he married aristocrat and skilled amateur singer Eulalia Goicoerrotea. From the moment he settled in the Spanish capital, he was dedicated to the promotion of young artists. He would offer large sums of money to this end. In a similar way he contributed to the monetization of the musical life of Madrid, holding philharmonic salon-like gatherings that became famous at the time.

Álvarez's salons were a catalytic platform for musicians like Felipe Pedrell, José Inzenga and Miguel Marqués. At these gatherings there were concerts, auditions, previews of premiering works and, occasionally, some theatric or operatic work would be represented. One such work was the opéra comique El médico a palos, or Le Médecin malgré lui, by Charles Gounod. The work was translated in 1872 in Álvarez's salon on the Calle de Fuencarral, in a version reorchestrated by Álvarez himself.

These salons did not only assist musicians, but also poets, journalists and painters like Manuel del Palacio and Eusebio Blasco, among others. It was in one of these salon gatherings that Pedrell took the opportunity to become friends with Álvarez. The result of this friendship was a hearing of unpublished Catalán musical works, which would premiere at the Teatro Real in 1876. At that same salon gathering, Pedrell was able to meet Hilarión Eslava, Francisco A. Barbieri, Emilio Arrieta and José Inzenga.

Each year the Álvarez family would take a trip to Paris, where they would interact with the musical elite of the city and create friendships with composers like Rossini, Auber, and Meyerbeer.

Álvarez died on July 15, 1898 at his home in Gracia, Barcelona.

== Works, editions and recordings ==
=== Opera and operetta ===
- Margarita, opera.
- El médico a palos, adaptation of Le médecin malgré lui (opera) by Charles Gounod.

=== Orchestral ===
- Obertura capricho.

=== Salon songs ===
- Los ojos negros, canción de salón.
- No volverán, canción de salón.
- La partida, canción de salón, recordings by Enrico Caruso and Luigi Alva (Decca 1963)
- A Granada, canción española
- and others

== Media ==
A Granada, canción española
recorded by Francisca Pomar de Maristany (His Master's Voice 1929)

La Partida, traditional folk song
recorded by Enrico Caruso
