= El estreno de una artista =

Zarzuela by Joaquín Gaztambide (1852)

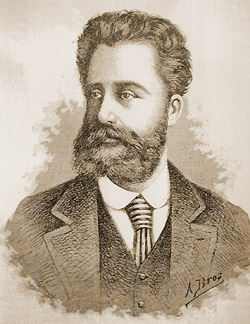
Composer Joaquín Gaztambide

El estreno de una artista (The Premiere of a Performer) is a one-act zarzuela by Joaquín Gaztambide for libretto by Ventura de la Vega. Its first performance took place on 5 June 1852 at the Teatro del Circo in Madrid. It is an adaptation of an 1824 French opéra-comique Le concert à la cour by Eugène Scribe and Mélesville, music for which was written by Daniel Auber. After a long period of neglection, this zarzuela has been recently staged by the Teatro de la Zarzuela (2011).

== Roles ==
Role	Voice type	Premiere cast, 5 June 1852
The Grand Duke	bass	Francisco Calvet
Enrique	tenor	Gonzalez
Sofía	soprano	Luisa Santamaría
Astucio	baritone	Francisco Salas
Marietta	soprano	Rizo
Chorus: ladies and gentlemen

== Synopsis ==
The zarzuela is set in Florence, in a music hall of the Grand Duke's palace. The opening scene presents Astucio, the musical director of the court, conducting an orchestra consisting of nobles, who study music to gain the Grand Duke's favour; they perform bad and finish making a quarrel, but Astucio succeeds to calm them (No. 1). The whole company proceeds to another room. Astucio's wife and prima donna Marietta comes to try a new piece of music she is going to sing this evening. But while she prepares to do this, a young man enters, Enrique. They recognize each other: they fell in love in Milan, before she fled away without saying a word. She is tired of Astucio's jealousy and control, and wants Enrique to revive the old feelings. But he is in love with another one, a Spanish singer met in Milan (Sofía), with whom he had to separate in order to find a post somewhere else in Italy.

Astucio comes back, and Marietta insists that Enrique demonstratively and passionately kiss her hand; the musical director is full of anger and refuses to introduce him to the Grand Duke; instead, Marietta promises she will do this on her own (No. 2). Enrique leaves the room to prepare for the rehearsal. Another female singer has come from Milan, and Astucio is ordered by the Grand Duke to form a committee examining her talent. To make her failure sure, he arranges this committee of two absent officials, Marietta and himself, thus only they two are present at the rehearsal. However, Marietta is bored with him driving all her potential rivals away and wants a real contest, if the candidate is capable enough. Enters Sofía and performs a beautiful Spanish aria playing the role of a gitanilla (No. 3). Marietta admires her, but Astucio says she has a lot to study yet.

Left alone, the pained girl intends to go away and return to her homeland. The Gran Duke enters through a secret door, and consoles her without being recognized. In a letter to Astucio he commands to let Sofía sing as Juliet at the theatre this evening. After he disappears, Enrique comes back. The two lovers are happy with their reunion and promise not to part anymore (No. 4). Enrique has just spoken to Astucio, who paid to the crowd so that they hiss Sofía off even before she opens her mouth. Luckily, the Grand Duke returns. He sends another order to Astucio and assigns a private performance by Sofía for the court.

Marietta managed to put a good word for Enrique, a fact that displeases Astucio much. He sends her to the theater to sing Juliet and prepares for the private concert. His plan is to disturb Sofía with orchestra's incorrect playing. The final musical scene begins with the courtiers assembling; soon, after an introductory word by Astucio to the orchestra, enter the Grand Duke and the young artists, who recognize their mysterious protector; Sofía begins to sing the same Spanish aria, but the mess in the orchestra increases instantly, and finally she has to stop; the audience is about to leave, but Enrique reveals Astucio's plan, takes the baton himself and leads the musicians accompanying a new fine song of Sofía (No. 5). After her triumph, Marietta rushes into the scene: she was hissed and bombarded with edibles by the crowd. Astucio can't refuse his guilt anymore and falls out of the Grand Duke's favour, who asks Sofía to become Enrique's spose and provide both with a post.

== Musical numbers ==
- No. 1. Introduction and Chorus. ¡Piano... pianísimo...! (Astucio, chorus)
- No. 2. Trio. ¡Mi mujer con un galán! (Marietta, Enrique, Astucio)
- No. 3. Cavatina. ¡Alto aquí los caballeros! (Sofía, with Marietta and Actucio)
- No. 4. Duo. Esperanzas halagüeñas (Sofía, Enrique)
- No. 5. Concertante and Finale. Se acerca ya la hora (Sofía, Enrique, Astucio, The Grand Duke, chorus)
