= Francisco Salas =

Spanish opera singer (1812–1875)

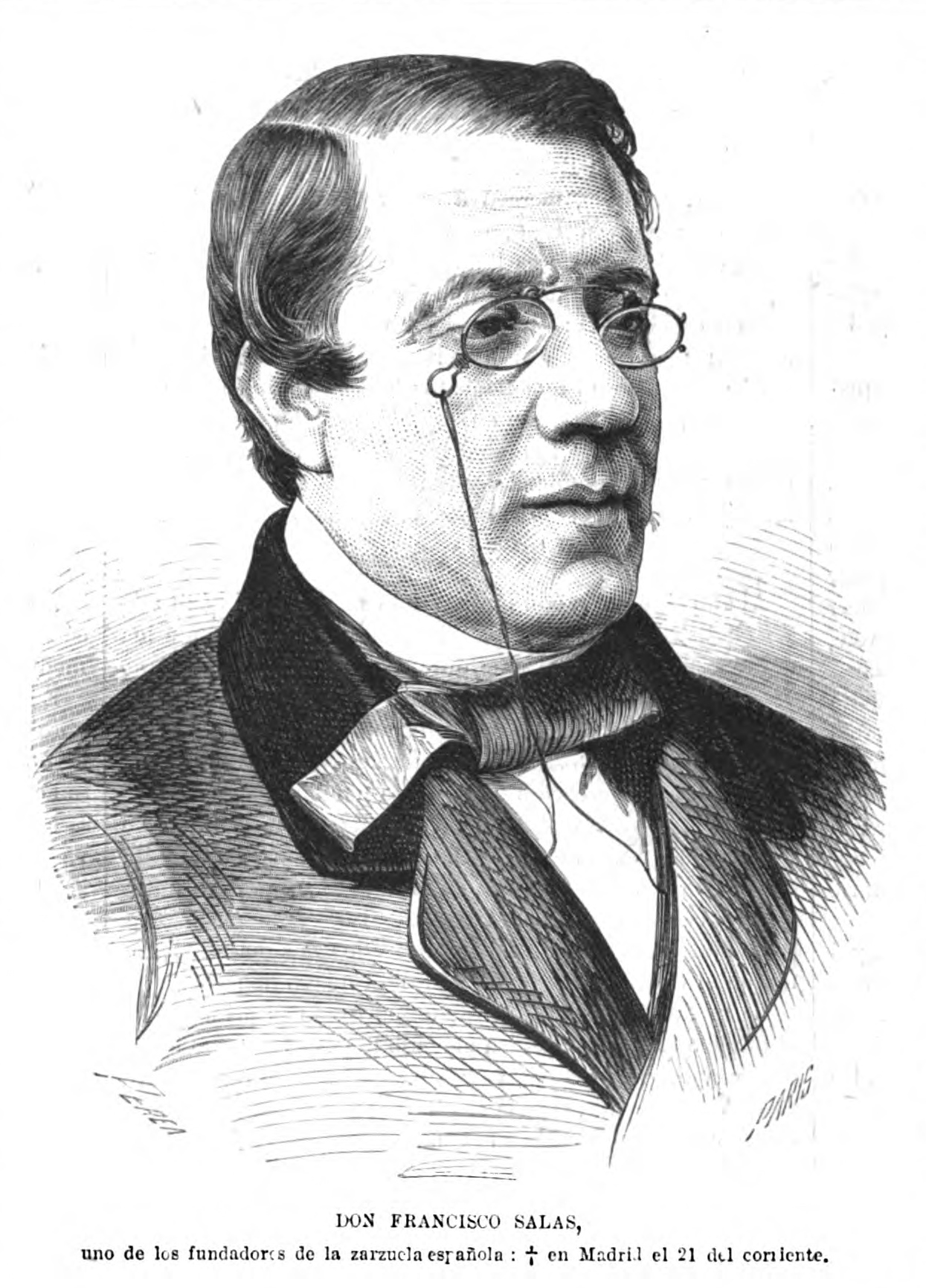
Francisco Salas

Francisco Lleroa y Salas (12 March 1812 in Albaicín, Province of Granada – 21 June 1875 in Madrid) was a Spanish classical opera singer (bass-baritone), one of the crucial figures in the revival of the zarzuela genre.

== Biography ==
=== Early years ===
Francisco Salas was born in Albaicín during its siege by the French. His father died the same year he was born. Thus, the boy had to work hard from early age. A famous tenor Lorenzo Valencia from Madrid came to Granada to sing in some operas, especially those by Rossini. He became Salas's first teacher and protector. In 1829 they went to Madrid, where the seventeen-year-old entered the choir of Teatro de la Cruz. There he studied with José Reart and tenor José Valero.

In October 1831 Salas made his soloist debut substituting the bass protagonist in I fidanzati, ossia Il contestabile di Chester by Pacini, and had success. From this moment he left the choir to perform "partiquinos y suplementos", and already in 1833 his name opened the playbill for the Le calife de Bagdad by Boieldieu. Around that time he met Bárbara Lamadrid, one of the most important singers on the Spanish scene of the period. They married and had three children. At their recitals, apart from the Italian airs, they both sang Spanish music (tonadillas, boleros, dances etc.).

=== Collaboration with Basilio Basili ===
Bárbara's sister, Teodora Lamadrid, an actress too, was married to Basilio Basili, a "Spanishized" Italian tenor and composer. With him Salas made his first attempt at Spanish lyrical comedy, El novio y el concierto, a sequence of Spanish songs mixed with Italian-stzled airs and recitatives. Although composed by a famous dramatist Manuel Bretón de los Herreros, this comedy went almost unnoticed. Salas' reputation at that time was based mainly on the comedy roles in Italian operas (I due Figaro by Mercadante, Un'avventura di Scaramuccia by Ricci and works by Rossini, Bellini and Donizetti).

In 1840 Salas came into possession of the Teatro de la Cruz. With this he began to promote Spanish works by Basili. Notable is El contrabandista, of which the press wrote that it was "the first Spanish production of such a class in modern time" (la primera producción española de esta clase en los tiempos modernos). Basili composed soon El ventorrillo de Crespo, but this was blamed for being "a crude copy of Italian opera with Spanish songs" (burda copia de la ópera italiana con canciones españolas). In 1842 the theatre's company spent two months in Granada, where also the famous singer Pauline Viardot stayed. She met Salas and even performed some duets with him.

Being only 30, Salas was considered the most prominent Spanish bass-baritone. In 1842 he became famous also as a composer, publishing a song, Los toros del puerto, which gained an enormous popularity. Its tune was later used by Franz Liszt in one of his compositions. With some other songs and a new stage work by Basili, La pendencia, Salas arranged with a tenor Ojeda in 1844 a northern tour ending in Paris. They intended to have a performance at an Italian theatre led by Rossini, but for some couldn't to this. Nevertheless they gave some private performances in aristocratic salons.

A further opera by Basili, El diablo predicador, gets same accusions of mixing national songs with Italian style. The society felt the request for a typically Spanish theater, and the Academia Real de la Música created an association to support such attempts. They organized several meetings at the Liceo Artístico, but making little utility.

Even the royal family was interested in creating Spanish music, which could compete with Italian: at the wedding fests of Isabella II and infante Francis Spanish music prevailed, and Salas performed some songs during the presentation of Hartzenbusch's La alcaldesa de Zamarramala.

=== The creation of zarzuela ===
In 1846 the Teatro de la Cruz was closed, and the leading role in the struggle for the Spanish lyrical theater passed to the Teatro del Circo. Many songs staged there were chosen not because of their musical merits but because they let Salas show his abilities: this was one of the best guarantees for getting the public.

In 1848 composer Rafael Hernando with librettist Mariano Pina Bohígas produced Colegialas y soldados at the Teatro del Instituto Español. It is considered the first play responding to the future canons of the zarzuela genre. Hernando soon repeated the same features in El duende, staged at the Teatro Variedades. Motivated by these successful works, Francisco Salas encouraged some writers and composers to produce more zarzuelas, both comic and serious. The principal pioneers of the genre became composers Joaquín Gaztambide, Francisco Asenjo Barbieri, Cristóbal Oudrid, and a bit later Emilio Arrieta; they were accompanied by dramatists Ventura de la Vega, Luis Mariano de Larra, Luis de Olona and José de la Villa.

== Sources ==
- José Miguel Barberá Soler. Francisco Salas: El granadino que creó la zarzuela
