= Basilio Basili =

Italian tenor and composer

Basilio Basili (21 March 1804 – 1895) was an Italian tenor and composer.

Basili was born in Macerata. In 1827 he moved to Madrid, where he debuted on 14 September at the Teatro de La Cruz singing Otello by Rossini. He moved permanently to Madrid in 1837, where he was a professor and served as a conductor and an occasional composer. In 1839, he made his Spanish opera debut at the Teatro de La Cruz. In 1844 he was appointed Director and Chorus Master of the Italian opera in Madrid. Later, he presented and directed a number of performances at the Ventadour in Paris, both orchestral and operatic music, revolving around mainly Italian and Castilian Spanish folk music.

He was married to Teodora Lamadrid, sister of the famous singer Bárbara Lamadrid, whose husband was baritone Francisco Salas. The latter was leader of the Teatro de la Cruz in 1840–1846, and for his company Basilio composed several operas including El contrabandista, El ventorrillo de Crespo, La pendencia, El diablo predicador (claimed to be his greatest success, with text by Ventura de la Vega, 1846). Basilio Basili was one of those who attempted to revive the tradition of Spanish musical theatre. In 1847, along with Hilarion Eslava and other musicians, he founded "Espana Musical," a group committed to promoting the cause of Spanish national music.

In 1877 he moved to Argentina upon the invitation of the "Comisión de la Escuela de Musica" in Buenos Aires Province and also gave piano lessons. In Buenos Aires he published several of his compositions. In 1885 he made a long trip to the United States and died in New York in 1895.
