= Una vieja =

1860 zarzuela by Joaquín Gaztambide

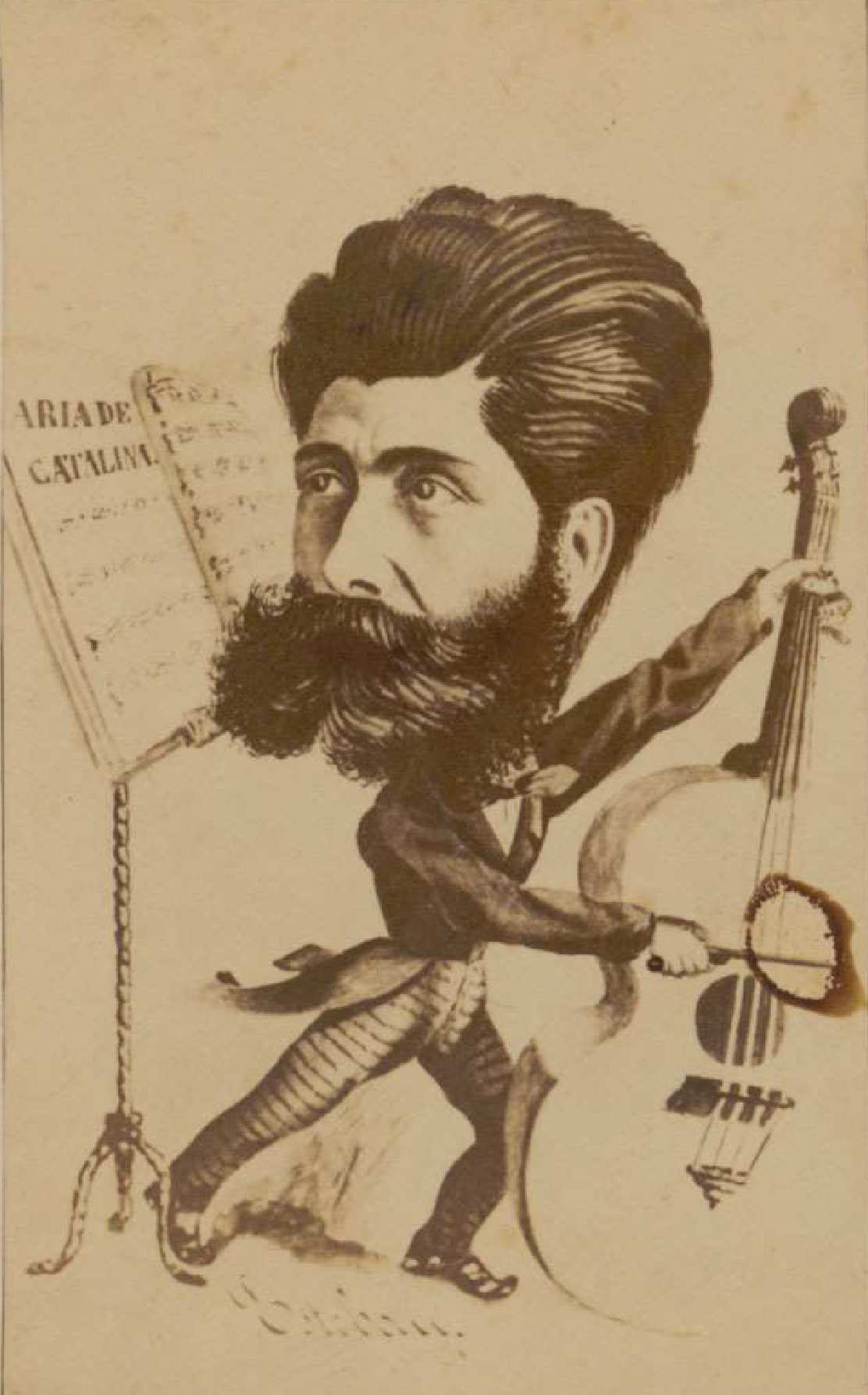
Composer Joaquín Gaztambide

Una vieja (Spanish: An Old Lady) is a one-act zarzuela by Joaquín Gaztambide for libretto (in verse) by Francisco Camprodón. It is based on a French opéra comique La vieille by Eugène Scribe and François-Joseph Fétis (1826). The zarzuela got its first performance on 11 or 14 December 1860 at the Teatro de la Zarzuela in Madrid. It was regularly staged until 1940s and has been revived occasionally in later times.

== Roles ==
Role	Voice type	Premiere cast, 11/14 December 1860
Adela	soprano	Trinidad Ramos
Conrado, an officer	tenor	Manuel Sanz
León, an artist	baritone	Ramón Cubero
Pancho	bass	Francisco Arderius
A Servant	spoken role	

== Synopsis ==
The action is placed in Mexico in 1826, during the Mexican War of Independence (which actually ended already in 1821). A beautiful Mexican girl, Adela, a widow of an old rich patriot, wanted to get back from Texas to Mexico. Disguised as an old woman she attempted to cross the war zone. She was escorted by a Spanish squadron commanded by captain Conrado, with whom she fell in love. When he got wounded and imprisoned, Adela succeeded to take him to her house to look after him.

At the moment the play begins, Conrado feels much better, but still keeps staying at the old lady's house. A friend from Spain comes to him, and while waiting for the visitor he recalls his native land and sings of a lost girl (No. 1). The Spaniard turns out to be León, an artist and an old friend of the captain. Soon comes Adela, and Conrado introduces León to her (No. 2). He wants the artist to picture his savior, but Adela declines this idea. León tells her that Conrado is in love with a girl from a portrait, which was drawn once by him from a photo, but they never knew who was the beauty depicted on it. Accompanied by Adela playing the piano, Conrado sings an American song (No. 3), and while responding to him, she changes her voice from old to young and back.

Adele's butler Pancho enters with bad news: a decree of the rebellious government orders to send all the captives to Texas. Everybody is confused by such a sudden disaster, and Conrado follows the old lady to her room in order to think out a solution and avoid him being imprisoned. Left alone, León imagines himself singing to the governor (No. 4). Pancho returns and announces Adela's plan: the old lady pretends to marry Conrado. To make this they signed a fake wedding certificate. He goes to a friendly notary, but mixes the plan up and takes the certificate to the mayor, thus making the marriage a true one. León tries to support his friend in this complicate situation (No. 5). The false old lady shows for a moment her real appearance to the captain, who admits with amazement that she is the girl from the portrait he loves. Finally Adela comes out as a young, and the play ends happily with everyone praising love (No. 6).

== Musical numbers ==
- Overture
- No. 1. Cavatina. Un español que viene à verme aquí (Conrado)
- No. 2. Trio. Noble señora tengo el honor (Adela, Conrado, León)
- No. 3. Americana. Malhayan ¡ay! las brisas (Adela, Conrado, León)
- No. 4. Arietta (tango and manchegas). Haré por ponerme triste (León)
- No. 5. Tragic seguidilla. En luchas desiguales (Conrado, León)
- No. 6. Rondó final. De un nuevo sol la inmensa claridad (Adela, Conrado, León, Pancho)

The Overture makes use of three tunes from the zarzuela. After a brief B minor introduction (Andantino moderato) based on the Americana (No. 3), begins the main part (Allegro moderato) in B major, which is actually the fast section of the Trio (No. 2). It is interrupted by a slower episode (Menos in D major, actually a tune from the Rondó final), but the music soon gets back to the principal theme and proceeds to a coda.

== Recordings ==
There is no recording of the complete zarzuela. Separate musical numbers had been recorded in the first third of the 20th century: No. 1 by tenors Eduardo García Bergés (1909), Antonio Cortis (1915, reissued on a 1993 Nimbus Records CD), Ignacio Genovés (1922) and José Romeu Parra (1931). A recording of No. 4 was made by baritone Ernesto Hervás (1909).
