= El juramento (zarzuela) =

Loner

El juramento (Spanish for The Oath) is a 3-act zarzuela by Joaquín Gaztambide for libretto by Luis de Olona. Its central character (the Marquis) is taken from a French operetta La Rose de Peronne by Eugène Scribe and Adolphe Adam (1840), but the new work is entirely original. It was first staged on 20 December 1858 at the Teatro de la Zarzuela. It is thought to be among Gaztambide's best compositions and one of the most important scores in the history of zarzuela. The first modern performance took place in 2000 in Madrid Teatro de la Zarzuela.

== Roles ==
Role	Voice type	Premiere cast, 20 December 1858
María	soprano	Josefa Mora
The Baroness	soprano	Luisa Santamaría
Marquis de San Esteban	baritone	Tirso de Obregón
Don Carlos	baritone	Ramón Cubero
The Count	bass	Francisco Calvet
Corporal Peralta	baritone	Francisco Salas
Sebastián	comic tenor	Vicente Caltañazor
Chorus: officers, soldiers, countrymen of both sex

== Musical numbers ==
Act I
No. 1. Prelude and introduction. ¡Ellos son!, ¡ellos son! (María, the Count, Sebastián, chorus of countrymen)
No. 2. Chorus ¡Torpe! Señora, ¡sosegaos! (the Baroness, chorus of countrymen)
No. 2 bis. Cavatina. El arroyo, la enramada (the Baroness, chorus of countrymen)
No. 3. María's romance. ¡Ah! Yo me vi en el mundo (María)
No. 3 bis. Marquis's romance. Cual brilla el sol (the Marquis, Peralta)
No. 3 ter. Trio . Guarde Dios à la niña hermosa (María, the Marquis, Peralta)
No. 4. Finale I Su rara hermosura (María, the Baroness, the Marquis, the Count, Peralta, Sebastián, chorus of contrymen)
Act II
No. 5. Introduction and the "Chu, chu, chu" chorus. Vedle qué pensativo (Sebastián, chorus of countrymen)
No. 6. Scene and cavatina. ¡Ja!, ¡ja!, ¡ja! ¡Oh, qué Marqués! (María, the Count, the Baroness)
No. 7. Romance. Gracias, fortuna mía (Don Carlos)
No. 8. Duo by the piano. Es el desdén acero (María, the Marquis)
No. 9. Duo – Finale II. ¿Qué os sucede? (María, Sebastián)
Act III
No. 10. Introduction and the rouse chorus. Soldados de la ronda (chorus of soldiers)
No. 11. Drinking song and duo of the drunks. ¡Brindis! ¡A la fortuna! (Peralta, Sebastián)
No. 12. Duo. Guarde Dios al gentil marido (María, the Marquis)
No. 13. Finale. ¡Ah! Risueña brilló la aurora (all soloists, chorus of soldiers)
