= Enciclopedia moderna =

Spanish encyclopedia

Enciclopedia moderna (in English: Modern Encyclopedia) (complete title: Enciclopedia moderna: Diccionario universal de literatura, ciencias, artes, agricultura, industria y comercio) is a Spanish encyclopedia published in Madrid by Francisco de Paula Mellado between 1851 and 1855. It has 34 volumes and it was the first "great" Spanish encyclopedia.

Some of the authors of this encyclopedia are Juan Eugenio Hartzenbusch, Eugenio de Ochoa, Manuel Bretón de los Herreros, Ramón Mesonero Romanos, Tomás Rodríguez Rubi, Pedro de Madrazo, Rafael María Baralt, Ventura de la Vega, Modesto Lafuente, Antonio Flores, José María Antequera, Pedro Felipe Monlau, Facundo Goñy, El Conde de Fabraquer, Jorge Lasso de la Vega, Augusto de Burgos, Francisco Pareja de Alarcón, Francisco Fernández Villabrille, Alfredo Alfonso Camus, Basilio Sebastián Castellanos, Joaquín Pérez Comoto, Robustiano Pérez de Santiago, Alejandro Magariños Cervantes, Antonio Ferrer del Río, Antonio Pirala, Emilio Bravo, Joaquín Espín y Guillén, Ubaldo Pasaron y Lastra.
