= Franz Lorinser =

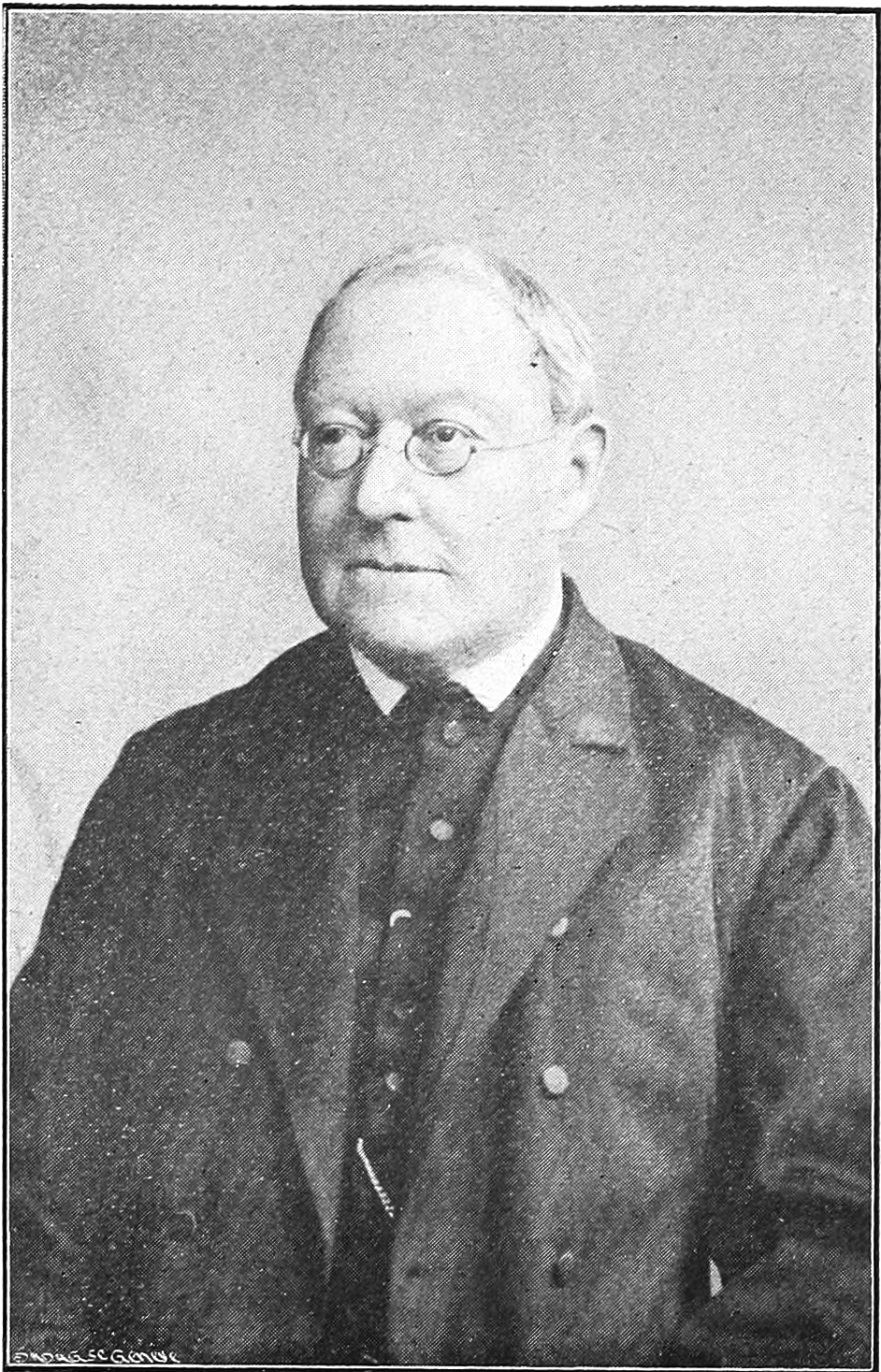

Carl Maria Franz Lorinser (12 March 1821 - 12 November 1893) was a German Catholic theologian, translator from Sanskrit and Spanish, and a writer on natural history.

Lorinser was born in Berlin where his father was Karl Ignatius, a physician. The family had moved to Oppeln, Upper Silesia where Franz went to school. He then went to Breslau and Munich to study theology. In 1842 he went to Rome to study in the seminary there. He was ordained by Cardinal Patrizi on December 23, 1843. Returning to Germany in 1844 he spent time in Munich and then worked as chaplain, later pastor in Breslau. He died at Breslau.

Lorinser writings included a seven part Book of Nature which covered, astronomy, geology, meteorology, botany and zoology. He translated several works from Spanish including the writings of Jacob Balmes. In 1869 he translated the Bhagavad-Gita into German, and considered the writings to have been drawn from Christian works.
