= Amalia Ramírez =

Spanish zarzuela singer

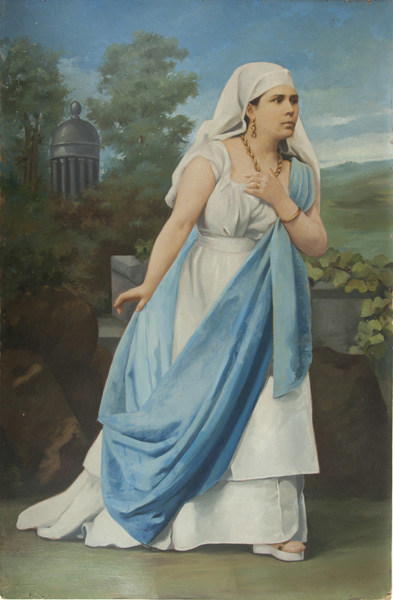
Amalia Ramírez in Rossini's Moises

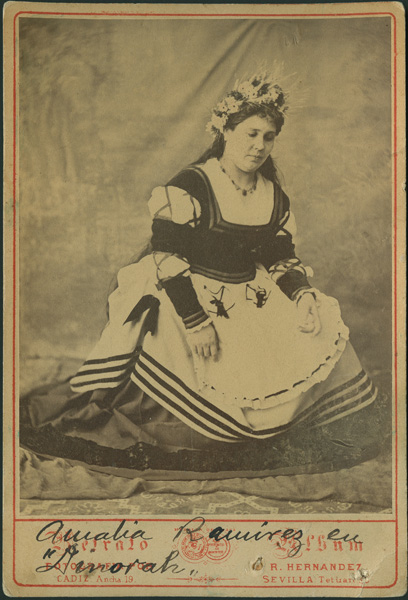
Amalia Ramírez in Dinorah

María Amalia Ramírez (née de los Dolores de la Aparición de Santiago; 23 May 1834, Lupión, Jaén, Spain – 25 February 1918, Madrid, Spain) was a Spanish zarzuela singer.

== Biography ==
She was born into a well-off military family. Her father, Ramón Rafael Ramírez, was an infantry commandant (approximately lieutenant colonel and her mother was Ana Sánchez del Campo Rubio. As a child, Amalia showed talent for music, but her father's position required frequent moves, she was unable to attain formal, continuous musical education. Despite the lack of training, at the age of eleven she debuted at a charitable event, singing the cavatina of the opera of Betti.

The carlist movement and her father's death put the family into a difficult financial situation, which motivated Amalia to develop her musical career. She attended the Conservatoire of Madrid, studying with the teachers Valldemosa and Saldón.

== Musical career ==
Ramírez had offers to join several opera companies, but instead chose to pursue a career in zarzuela, a genre that was experiencing a rebirth as part of the Romantic era. She debuted in the Circus at the beginning of 1853, in El dómino azul by Emilio Arrieta and Francisco Camprodón. In the following years, she acted in works such as Catalina, Mis dos mujeres, Guerra a muerte, Marina, La hija del regimiento and Llamada y tropa.

After three years of performances, she signed an exclusive two-year contract with the company Cádiz, which caused local composers to ban her from performing their works in an attempt to force her out of her contract. Undeterred, Ramírez turned to comic Italian operas translated into Spanish, which were in fashion. She briefly retired when her mother died, but rejoined to performing shortly afterwards, touring successfully in the Americas between 1857 and 1860.

Ramírez married the republican doctor Adolfo of Rosa, with whom she had three children and once again retired from the stage. His politics obliged their emigration during the Spanish Restoration in 1874, which gave Amalia the opportunity to perform in the operas of Corsi in Milan, Gayarre, Patierne and Algdighieri in Bolonia and Verger in Paris.

== Premiere roles ==
- Galanteos en Venecia
- El valle de Andorra
- La cisterna encantada
- La Cacería Real
- Los jardines del Buen Retiro
- La cola del diablo
- El grumete
- El estreno de un artista

== Bibliography ==
- García, Antonio (2012). Amalia Ramírez, cantante de zarzuela y ópera: nacida en Lupión (Jaén) el 23 de mayo de 1834. Diputación Provincial de Jaén, Cultura y Deportes. OCLC 828275298.
- Webber, Christopher (2002). The Zarzuela Companion. Lanham, Maryland: Scarecrow Press. ISBN 978-1-4616-7390-3.
