= Rafael Hernando =

Spanish composer

Rafael José Maria Hernando y Palomar (31 May 1822, in Madrid – 10 July 1888, in Madrid) was a Spanish composer of zarzuelas, being that his contributions to the genre lead to the development of the zarzuela grande. His body of work consists of 17 operettas and some religious works. None of his zazuelas has been in the repertoire of today.

== Biography ==
Son of Pedro Hernando and Eugenia Hernando Palomar, his mother left him an orphan at the age of two. At fifteen he entered the Madrid Conservatory, where he studied music theory and piano with Pedro Albéniz, singing with Baltasar Saldoni, and composition with Ramon Carnicer.

In 1843, he moved to Paris, studying with Miguel García and befriending Daniel Auber. But following the outbreak of the Revolutions of 1848, and having received a message warning him of the impending death of his father, he returned to quickly Spain. He soon then joined other composers who would come to lead the revival of the zarzuela genre such as Francisco Asenjo Barbieri, Cristóbal Oudrid, José Inzenga and Joaquín Gaztambide.

== Works ==
- 1849 El duende - Zarzuela - Libreto by Luis de Olona
- 1849 Palo de ciego - Zarzuela en 1 acto - Libreto by Juan del Peral
- 1849 Colegialas y soldados - Zarzuela en 2 actos - Libreto by Mariano Pina
- 1850 Bertoldo y comparsa - Libreto by Gregorio Romero y Larrañaga
- 1851 Escenas de Chamberí - Collective work - Libreto by Luis de Olona
- 1851 Segunda parte de El duende - Zarzuela en 2 actos - Libreto by Luis de Olona
- 1852 El novio pasado por agua - Zarzuela en 3 actos - Libreto by Manuel Bretón de los Herreros
- 1852 El secreto de la Reina - Co-authors Joaquín Gaztambide and José Inzenga
- 1853 Don Simplicio Bobadilla - Co-authors Joaquín Gaztambide, Francisco Asenjo Barbieri and José Inzenga - Libretto by Manuel Tamayo y Baus
- 1854 Cosas de don Juan - Zarzuela en 3 actos - Libreto by Manuel Bretón de los Herreros
- 1860 El tambor - Libreto by Emilio Álvarez
