= Juan Ariza =

Spanish novelist, poet, and playwright (1816–1876)

Juan de Ariza was born in Motril, Granada, Spain on December 11, 1816, and died in Havana, Cuba on July 20, 1876. He was a Spanish novelist, poet, and playwright whose work falls largely into the literary tradition of Romanticism. He is listed in the "Spanish Authors Collection".

== Biography ==
Juan Ariza was the son of a wealthy family. His father died when Juan was four years old and his uncle, Juan Fernando de Ariza, took charge of the youngster's education. At age thirty-seven, Juan Ariza worked at the Teatro Liceo de Motril. At age forty, he moved to Madrid where he wrote for various newspapers and magazines. In 1843, his first known work appears, A la heroica Granada. From 1845 he became known first for his historical novels and then stories inspired by popular traditions. One of his novels, Un viaje al infierno (a trip to hell), is a satire of contemporary Madrid and its people. The most important of his historical novels was El Dos de Mayo (1846). While in Madrid he befriended Ventura de la Vega and Juan Martínez Villergas. His most fruitful period was from 1848 to 1854, with more than twenty literary works, as well as collaborations with Rubí y Ventura de la Vega in the 1850 comedy Un clavo saca otro clavo (a hair of the dog). That same year he premiered his tragedy Remismunda, perhaps the best of his plays that mixes classicism and romanticism. In 1853 saw the premiere of four of his works in Madrid, including La flor del valle with music by Luis Arche. His last plays were represented in 1854, the year he was appointed Director General of the Colonies. In 1856 he came to Cuba as a senior government official. There he served as Secretary and Minister of the Court of Auditors and also held Vice President of the Spanish Casino de la Habana. In 1867 he was appointed Director of Diario de la Marina in Havana, a post he held until his death, that is, for nine years. He witnessed the outbreak of the first of the wars in Cuba. He passionately defended the interests of colonial Spain.

== Works ==
=== Novels ===
- Un viaje al infierno (A trip to hell), Madrid, 1848–1851
- Don Juan de Austria o Las guerras de Flandes, Madrid, 1847. Reprinted in Madrid: Lecturas para Todos, 1933 and again in Madrid: Apostolado de la Prensa, 1961
- Las tres Navidades (The three Christmas), Madrid, 1846
- Los dos Reyes: novela histórica (The two kings: a historical novel), Madrid, 1845, reprinted in 1848
- El dos de mayo: novela histórica (The Second of May: a historical novel), Madrid: Hortelano y Compañía, 1846, reprinted in 1849
- Antes y después (Before and after), Habana:Imprenta del Diario de la Marina, 1859

=== Poetry ===
- Las ruinas de Sancho el Diablo. Tradición popular, Madrid, 1848

=== Theatre ===
- Antonio de Leiva, Madrid, 1849, reprinted in 1855 and in Salamanca in 1870
- Un clavo saca a otro clavo. Comedia., co-authored with Tomás Rodríguez y Díaz Rubí and Ventura de la Vega, Madrid, 1850
- Mocedades de Pulgar, Madrid, 1847.
- El primer Girón, Madrid, 1850, reprinted in 1868.
- Don Alonso de Ercilla, Madrid: José de Santiago, 1848
- Dios, mi brazo y mi derecho, Madrid, 1853, reprinted in 1867.
- La Flor del valle: zarzuela; música de Luis Arche Madrid: Círculo Literario Comercial, 1853
- La fuerza de voluntad, Madrid: Círculo Literario Comercial, 1852
- Un loco hace ciento. Comedia, Madrid: Círculo Literario Comercial, 1853
- La mano de Dios. Drama histórico, Madrid: Círculo Literario Comercial, 1854
- El oro y el oropel. Comedia, Madrid, 1853 (reprinted in Salamanca in 1863)
- Obras líricas y dramáticas, México: Boix y compañía, 1851
- Pedro Navarro, Madrid: Círculo Literario Comercial, 1854
- El ramo de rosas, Madrid: Círculo Literario Comercial, 1851
- Remismunda. Tragedia, Madrid: Círculo Literario Comercial, 1854
- Comedias Introducción y notas, Francisco Ayudarte Granados. Motril: Auskaría Mediterránea, 1996
