= Francisco Hernández Tomé =

Spanish painter

Francisco Hernández Tomé (died 1872) was a Spanish mural painter who decorated the interiors of many churches and theatres in Madrid.

Among his works:

- San Isidro el Real
- Toledo Cathedral
- ceiling of the Teatro de la Zarzuela, destroyed by fire 1909
