= Hilarión Eslava =

Spanish composer and pedagogue (1807–1878)

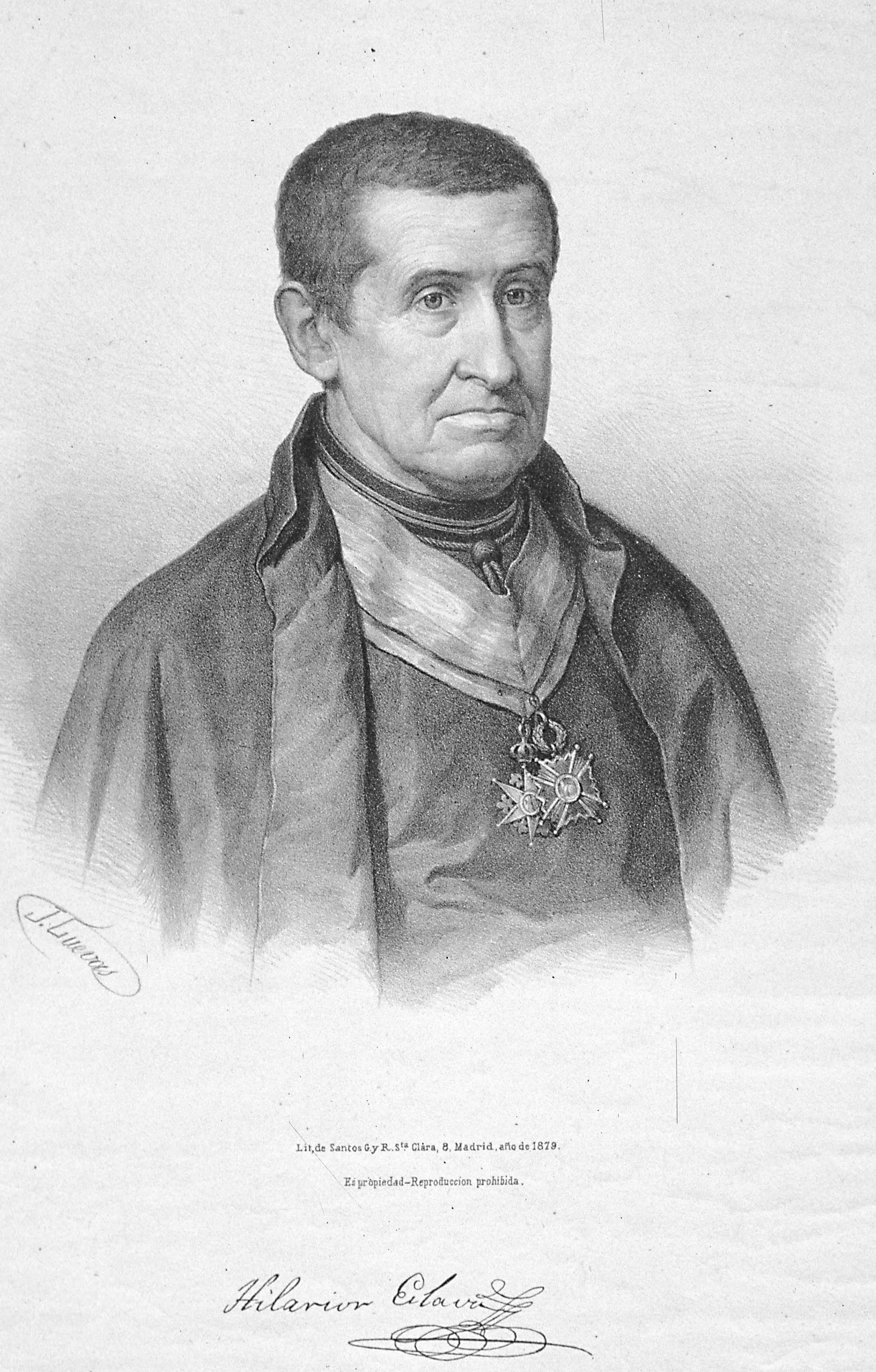
Hilarión Eslava

Miguel Hilarión Eslava y Elizondo (21 October 1807 – 23 July 1878) was a Spanish composer and pedagogue.

== Professional career ==
Born in Burlada, Navarra, Eslava was co-founder of the society La España Musical with Emilio Arrieta, Francisco Asenjo Barbieri, and Joaquín Gaztambide to defend Spanish opera and zarzuela.

== Death ==
He died in Madrid aged 70.
