= Mateo Albéniz =

Spanish composer, theorist and priest

Mateo Albéniz, also known as Mateo Antonio Pérez de Albéniz (c. 1755 – 23 June 1831) was a Spanish composer, theorist, and priest. He is not related to the better-known composer Isaac Albéniz, but he was the father of Pedro Albéniz. He is identified by the name Pedro Albéniz in some older biographical sources and was said to have died in 1821.

He was born in the Basque region. He held a post as Maestro de Capilla in San Sebastián and in Logroño from 1795 to 1800, when he returned to San Sebastián (where he died) until his retirement in 1829.

He composed masses, vespers, motets, and other church music, never published, and a book of solfeggi (published at St. Sebastian, 1800). Albéniz also wrote for the harpsichord and fortepiano. The work by which he is best known today is the Sonata in D major, of which a popular transcription for guitar has been made.
