= Manuel Ausensi =

Spanish singer

Manuel Ausensi i Albalat (Catalan: [mənuˈɛl əwˈzɛnsi]; 8 October 1919 – 1 September 2005) was a Catalan baritone opera singer.

Ausensi was born in Barcelona. During the Spanish Civil War, he studied singing in Valencia and then in the Municipal Conservatory of Barcelona. He made his stage debut in 1946 at the Tivoli Theater. In 1947 he sang in Gaetano Donizetti's Anna Bolena at the Liceu.

He was considered particularly outstanding in roles such as Rigoletto, but also sang eighteenth century music such as Mozart and Cimarosa and French romantic opera at the Liceu for thirteen consecutive seasons. He recorded a famous full version of The Barber of Seville conducted by Silvio Varviso and co-starring Teresa Berganza and Ugo Benelli in 1964. He also recorded the leading role in several Spanish zarzuelas such as La calesera, El caserío, Los gavilanes, Katiuska, La legió d'honor, Los diamantes de la corona and Jugar con fuego.

He retired in 1973, but in 1990 he returned for a benefit concert for the Opera House in Catalonia. In 1997 he received the Creu de Sant Jordi. He died in Creixell, aged 85.
