= Emilio Arrieta =

Spanish composer

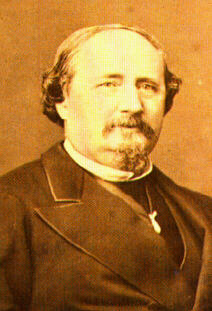
- Born: 9 November 1821; Puente la Reina, Navarre, Spain
- Died: 11 February 1894 (aged 72); Madrid, Spain
- Occupation: Composer

Juan Pascual Antonio Arrieta Corera (20 October 1821 – 11 February 1894), known as Emilio Arrieta, was a Spanish composer.

Arrieta was born in Puente la Reina, Navarre. His Italian musical training led him, under the favour of Queen Isabel II, to concentrate on operatic writing; and though he later composed zarzuelas, he remained less committed to the renascent art form than his contemporaries such as Francisco Asenjo Barbieri, who continued to write in an essentially Italianate style throughout his life. His zarzuela Marina, one of the most popular lyric stage works in the Spanish repertoire, has been produced and recorded both on CD and DVD many times.

Arrieta died in Madrid, aged 72.

== Works ==
=== Operas ===
- 1846 Ildegonda
- 1850 La conquista di Granata, 3 acts with libretto by Temistocle Solera
- 1851 Pergolesi
- 1871 Marina, 3 acts (adapted from the 1855 zarzuela) with libretto by Francisco Camprodón and Miguel Ramos Carrión

=== Zarzuelas ===
- 1853 El dominó Azul, 3 acts with libretto by Francisco Camprodón
- 1853 El grumete, 1 acte with libretto by Antonio García Gutiérrez
- 1853 La estrella de Madrid, 3 acts with libretto by Adelardo López de Ayala
- 1854 La cacería real, 3 acts with libretto by Antonio Garcia Gutierrez
- 1855 Guerra a Muerte, 1 act with libretto by Adelardo López de Ayala
- 1855 La dama del Rey, 1 act with libretto by Francisco Navarro Villoslada.
- 1855 Marina, 2 acts with libretto by Francisco Camprodón
- 1856 La hija de la Providencia, 3 acts with libretto by Tomás Rodríguez y Díaz Rubí.
- 1856 El sonámbulo, 1 act with libretto by Antonio Hurtado.
- 1858 El planeta Venus, 3 acts with libretto by Ventura de la Vega
- 1858 Azón Visconti, 3 acts with libretto by Antonio García Gutiérrez
- 1860 Los circasianos, 3 acts with libretto by Luis de Olona
- 1861 Llamada y tropa, 2 acts with libretto by Antonio García Gutiérrez
- 1862 La Tabernera de Londres, 3 acts with libretto by Antonio García Gutiérrez.
- 1863 La vuelta del corsario, 1 act with libretto by Antonio García Gutiérrez (second part of El grumete)
- 1866 El duende de Madrid, 2 acts
- 1866 El conjuro, 1 act with libretto by Adelardo López de Ayala
- 1866 Un sarao y una soirée 2 acts with libretto by Miguel Ramos Carrión and Eduardo de Lustonó
- 1867 La suegra del diablo, 3 acts with libretto by Eusebio Blasco y Soler
- 1867 El figle enamorado, 1 act with libretto by Miguel Ramos Carrión
- 1867 Los novios de Teruel, 2 acts with libretto by Eusebio Blasco y Soler
- 1869 De Madrid a Biarritz, 2 acts with libretto by Miguel Ramos Carrión and Carlos Coello
- 1870 El potosí submarino, 3 acts with libretto by Rafael García Santisteban
- 1873 Las manzanas de oro, 3 acts with libretto by Eusebio Blasco y Soler and Emilio Álvarez
- 1875 Entre el alcalde y el rey, 3 acts with libretto by Nuñez de Arce.
- 1879 La guerra santa, 3 acts with libretto by Luis Mariano de Larra after Jules Verne
- 1880 Heliodora o El amor enamorado, 3 acts with libretto by Juan Eugenio Hartzenbusch
- 1883 San Franco de Sena, 3 acts with libretto by José Estremera
- 1885 El Guerrillero, (together with Manuel Fernández Caballero and Ruperto Chapí)
