= Francisco de Paula Mellado =

- Born: 1810; Granada, Kingdom of Spain
- Died: April 18, 1876 (aged 65–66); Bayonne, French Republic
- Occupations: Journalist, writer, geographer
- Honours: Grand Cross of the Order of Charles III

Francisco de Paula Mellado was a Spanish geographer, journalist, writer and editor who published the Enciclopedia moderna between 1851 and 1855.

== Works ==
- Aventuras extraordinarias de los viageros célebre, Madrid, 1850.
- Diccionario de artes y manufacturas..., Madrid: Est. Tip. de Mellado, 1856–57, 4 vol.
- Diccionario universal de historia y geografía, Madrid: Est. Tip. de Francisco de Paula Mellado, 1846–50, 8 vol.
- España geográfica, histórica, estadística y pintoresca:..., Madrid: Mellado: Gabinete literario, 1845, 946 pág.
- Guía del viajero de España, Madrid: Est. Tipogr., 1846.
- Recuerdos de un viaje por España, Madrid: Vieja España, 1975, 3 vol.
- Others

== Bibliography ==
- La obra de Francisco de Paula Mellado, fecundo y ejemplar impresor en el Romanticismo / María del Carmen de Artigas Sanz, Revista de archivos, bibliotecas y museos de Madrid, T. 73, nº 1, 1966.
