= Jaime Balmes =

Spanish sociologist, Catholic apologist and philosopher

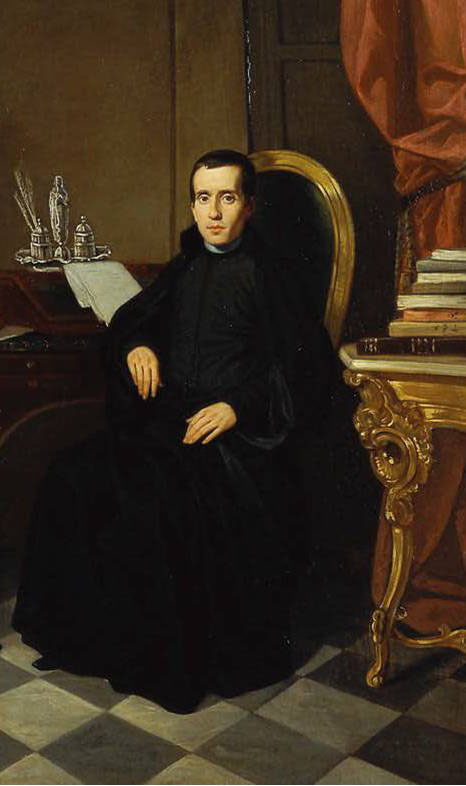
- Born: Jaime Luciano Antonio Balmes y Urpiá; 28 August 1810; Vic, Catalonia, Spain
- Died: 9 July 1848 (aged 37); Vic, Catalonia, Spain
- Burial place: Cathedral of St Peter of Vic
- Occupations: Theologian, presbyter and writer

Education
- Education: University of Cervera

Philosophical work
- Era: 19th-century philosophy
- Region: Western philosophy: Spanish philosophy
- School: Catholic philosophy: Thomism
- Main interests: Epistemology; Metaphysics; Society; Sociology; Theology

Jaime Luciano Balmes y Urpiá (Catalan: Jaume Llucià Antoni Balmes i Urpià; 28 August 1810 – 9 July 1848) was a Spanish philosopher, theologian, Catholic apologist, sociologist and political writer. Familiar with the doctrine of Saint Thomas Aquinas, Balmes was an original philosopher, who did not belong to any particular school or stream, and was called by Pope Pius XII the Prince of Modern Apologetics.

== Biography ==
Jaime Luciano Balmes y Urpiá was born at Vic, in the region of Catalonia, Spain. He was baptized the same day in the city's cathedral by the name of Jaime Luciano Antonio.

In 1817, Balmes began his studies at the seminary in Vic: three years of Latin grammar, three of rhetoric and from 1822 three of philosophy. In 1825, in Solsona, he received the tonsure from the city's bishop, Manuel Benito Tabernero.

From 1825 to 1826, Balmes studied courses of Theology, also in Vic Seminary. He studied four courses of theology because of a scholarship, in the College of San Carlos at the University of Cervera.

For two years in 1830, because of the closure of the University of Cervera, Balmes continued studying in Vic on his own. On 8 June 1833, he received his degree in theology.

On 20 September 1834, in the chapel of the episcopal palace of Vic, Balmes was ordained a priest by bishop don Pablo de Jesús Corcuera. He continued his studies in theology and of Canons, again at the University of Cervera. Finally, in 1835, he received the title of Doctor of Theology and Bachelor of Canons.

Balmes then made several attempts to teach in an official way at the University of Barcelona and did not appointed for some time in Vic tutoring. Finally, the City Council appointed him, in 1837, Professor of Mathematics, a position that he held for four years. In 1839, his mother Teresa Urpiá, died. In 1841, he moved to Barcelona.

Then, Balmes began his creative activity and contributed to various newspapers and magazines: Peace, Catholic Madrid, Civilization; and several pamphlets that attract readers' attention.

From 1841, his creative genius "exploded", and he developed in a few highly active months his writings and his personality, that would be admired throughout Europe.

On 7 September 1844, he wrote and published "The true idea of value, or thoughts on the origin, the nature and variations of the prices" in which he solved the value paradox, clearly introducing the notion of marginal use, Balmes asked himself, "Why a precious stone has a higher value than a piece of bread?"

Having attacked the regent Espartero, he was exiled. On his return, he founded and edited El Pensamiento de la Nación, a Catholic and conservative weekly; however, his fame rests principally on El Protestantismo comparado con el Catolicismo en sus relaciones con la Civilización Europea (Protestantism and Catholicity compared in their Effects on the Civilization of Europe), an able defence of Catholicism on the ground that it represents the spirit of obedience or order, as opposed to Protestantism, the spirit of revolt or anarchy. The book is often cited as a counter argument to historical accounts that focus on the reputed central role of the Protestant thought to the development of modern society.

According to the Encyclopædia Britannica Eleventh Edition:

The best of his philosophical works, which are clear expositions of the scholastic system of thought, are the Filosofia Fundamental (Basic Philosophy), and the Curso de Filosofia Elemental (A Course of Elementary Philosophy), which he translated into Latin for use in seminaries.

Balmes argued in favour of monarchy.

He died from tuberculosis in Vic in 1848.

== Thought ==
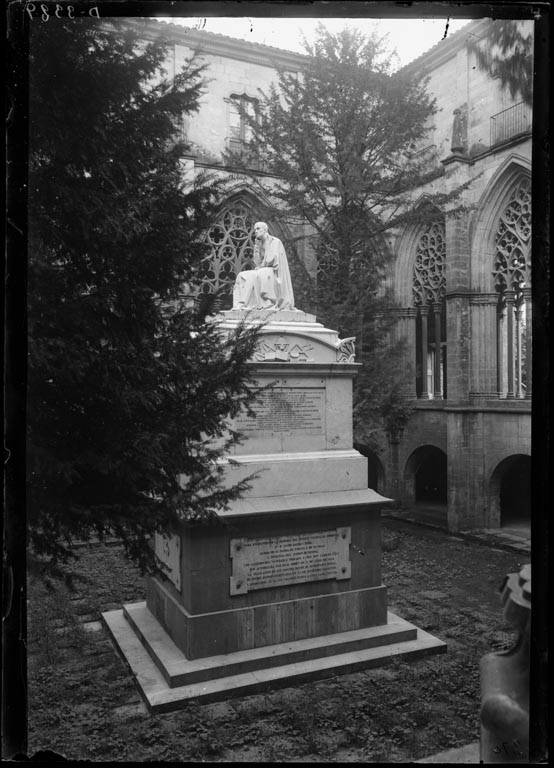
Monument to Jaime Balmes at the cloister of the Cathedral of Vic

Generally, Balmes's philosophy is understood merely as "philosophy of common sense", but in reality, it is something much more complex. In Fundamental Philosophy and Elementary Philosophy, the latter work being more informative, is the subject of certainty.

Balmes divides the truth into three irreducible classes although it is spoken of as if it were only one. They are the subjective truths, the rational truths and the objective truths. The first type of truth, the subjective one, can be understood as a present reality for the subject, which is real but depends on the perception of the speaker. For example, affirming that one is cold or thirsty is a subjective truth. The second type, the rational one, is logical and mathematical truth and uses any operation of this type as an example. Finally, the objective truth is understood a being perceived by all but does not fall within the category of rational truth such as that the sky is blue or that there are trees in the forest.

The three types of truth are irreducible, and the methods of recruitment differ from one another. Therefore, it is necessary for philosophy to conder firstly what kind of truth is being looked for.

For Balmes, there is no possibility of doubting everything: making such a statement causes one to forget that a series of rules of thought are admitted as truths to be able to doubt. In a similar way to that posed by St Augustine or Descartes, the affirmation of doubt necessarily implies the certainty that doubting occurs. An authentic radical skeptic is impossible because there is no universal doubt.

Certainty is natural and intuitive like doubt, and prior to philosophy. Thus, the common and natural certainty also encompasses the Cartesian philosophical certainty. To reach this certainty, the so-called "criteria" are necessary, the means by which the truth can be accessed. There are also many criteria for having several types of truths. However, Balmes prefers to distribute them into three categories: the criteria of conscience, those of evidence and those of common sense. These are the criteria for accessing the three types of truth. To define the corpus of Balmes's thought as "philosophy of common sense" is not so much due to his conception of common sense as inherent in philosophical work but especially his definition of this sense as a criterion for reaching a certainty. At this point, it is worth noting the relationship of subjective truths with criteria of conscience, rational truths with those of evidence and finally, objective truths accessible through the criterion of so-called "common sense".

Therefore, Balmes argues that metaphysics should not be sustained only on one column but on three, which correspond to the three truths: thus, the principle of Cartesian consciousness, the cogito ergo sum is a truth subjective, while the principle of non-contradiction Aristotelian is truly rational. Finally, common sense, the intellectual instinct (perhaps it is "intellectual instinct" a more specific term than "common sense") presents the so-called objective truth. It is impossible to find a truth common to the three principles.

In this way, Balmes denies the exclusivity of the theories of philosophers: philosophy is the fullness of natural knowledge, and is rooted in being a man. To affirm, for example, that the "cogito" is the foundation of truth and philosophy is not in itself a wrong assertion, because it is true what it affirms, but false what it denies, because besides the "cogito" There are other possibilities of foundation. Balmes does not reduce this idea only to the field of philosophy, and extends it also to general human thought.

In this way, Balmes's fundamental thesis is that there is no formula from which the universe can be detached. There is no truth from which all others arise. At this point, the three criteria can be defined more thoroughly.

=== Consciousness ===
Consciousness is what is noticed on the inside and is thought and experiencd. Sensations would be useless if they were not experienced in consciousness. This criterion has several characteristics: the first is the subjective nature of consciousness, that is, our perception is that of the phenomenon, not that of reality, although for Balmes, subjectivity does not imply that the certainty achieved is not true. It also has the function of pointing or presenting. Consciousness does not put in contact with external realityor with others (the existence of consciousness in others cannot be perceived or supposed), but it presents facts and is an absolute that dispenses with relationships. Consciousness has no objectivity or light and is pure presence.

When language expresses the conscience, it betrays it because something personal can not be expressed through something universal. Language is incapable of expressing pure consciousness, unlike art, for example. Likewise, consciousness can not be wrong either since its experience cannot be mistaken although it can be fallible when it leaves its ground to go outside. There is no error in the internal phenomenon but perhaps in its correspondence with the outside. Balmes, against the Cartesian animaina machina, defends that the animals also have conscience, but in his case it is reduced to the sensation, and not to the intellectualization of it. Thus, they possess only a direct consciousness, but humans have an intellective capacity and possess reflex consciousness, which is the capacity to reflect on the sensations of direct consciousness.

For Balmes, consciousness is the foundation of the other criteria, and all are necessarily born of it.

=== Evidence ===
Unlike consciousness, evidence is not singular and contingent. Evidence has universality and a logical necessity. Balmes divides between two types of evidence: the immediate and the mediat. The immediate does not require proof and is a priori knowledge such as that every object is equal to itself. On the other hand, mediate evidence requires demonstration.

Evidence does not capture a fact but captures its relationships. The idea of the predicate being in the subject (similar to the analytical judgment of Kant) is captured. All evidence is based on the principle of non-contradiction and is reduced to the analytical. Synthetic judgments that are not exclusively rational and do not consider that the criterion of evidence is accompanied by the senses are to be forgotten. Therefore, for Balmes, the analysis of consciousness is better than the analysis of evidence.

=== Intellectual instinct ===
Intellectual instinct gives the correspondence between the idea and reality and is not an animal instinct but a rational instinct. It allows the certainty (or at least a representation) that what is seen exists. Those kinds of truths, are by definition, broader than the intellectual truths of the evidence. The same truth can also be had by means of intelligence, rather than instinct. For example, it can be known whether a business works by an economic study or by an intuition of common sense. Thus, in the common sense, there is the unconscious, like the moral truths or the sensations, or what is seen through the intellectual instinct as evident such as scientific truths. It is also through that instinct that demonstrable truths are known without having to be proved or truth is considered as probability, the awareness of contingency. An example is awareness of the possibilities necessary to win the lottery or the achievement of writing something coherent by moving the pen randomly on paper.

For Balmes, those are the three pillars of metaphysics. A better definition is an analysis of cogito ergo sum, the Cartesian affirmation that "I think, therefore I exist". It is in principle a truth of conscience and is later transformed into an intellectual truth of evidence, a logical syllogism whose reality is understood through intuition. Having founded it on something intellectual, Descartes falls into the risk of reducing it to something logical and intellectual. For that reason, Balmes considers consciousness to be the fundamental pillar of metaphysics that transcends "cogito" as a clear and distinct Cartesian idea to become the pillar, where experience is lived and given sense.

== Works ==
- La Religión Demostrada al Alcance de los Niños, La Sociedad de Operarios, 1847.
- Consideraciones Políticas sobre la Situación de España, Imprensa de José Tauló, 1840.
- Observaciones Sociales, Políticas y Económicas sobre los Bienes del Clero, Reimpreso en la Oficina de M. Brambila, 1842.
- La Civilización, Tom. II, Tom. III, Brusi, 1841–1842.
- El Protestantismo Comparado con el Catolicismo en sus Relaciones con la Civilización Europea, Tom. II, Tom. III, Tom. IV, José Tauló, 1842–1845.
- El Criterio, A. Brusi, 1845.
- El Pensamiento de la Nación; Periódico Religioso, Político y Literario, Tom. II, Tom. III, Imprensa de E. Aguado, 1844–46.
- Cartas a un Escéptico en Materia de Religión, Impr. de A. Brusi, 1846.
- Pio IX, Impr. y fundicion de D. E. Aguado, 1847.
- Escritos Politicos, Sociedad de Operarios del Mismo Arte, 1847.
- Curso de Filosofía Elemental, Tom. II, Impr. y Fund. de E. Aguado, 1847.
- Escritos Póstumos del Dr. D. Jaime Balmes, Imp. de A. Brusi, 1850.
- Filosofía Fundamental, Tom. II, Garnier, 1852.
- Poesías Póstumas, Imprensa del Diario de Barcelona, 1870.
- Obras Completas del Dr. D. Jaime Balmes, Pbro. Primera Edición Crítica Ordenada y Anotada por el P. Ignacio Casanovas, S.J. Biblioteca Balmes, 33 Vol., 1925.
- "Verdadera idea del valor, o reflexiones sobre el origen, naturaleza y variedades de los precios", in Obra Completas, vol. 5, Madrid, BAC, 1949

=== Works in English translation ===
- European Civilization: Protestantism and Catholicity Compared in their Effects on the Civilization of Europe, Murphy & Co., 1850.
  - Protestantism and Catholicity Compared in their Effects on the Civilization of Europe, J. Murphy, G. Quigley, 1851.
- Fundamental Philosophy, Vol. II, D. & J. Sadlier & Co., 1858.
  - Fundamental Philosophy, Vol. II, D. & J. Sadlier & Co., 1871–1880.
- Letters to a Sceptic on Religious Matters, William B. Kelly, 1875.
- Elements of Logic, P. O'Shea, 1876.
- In Menczer, Béla, 1962. Catholic Political Thought, 1789–1848, University of Notre Dame Press.
  - "Faith and Liberty," pp. 185–191.

== See also ==
- Carrer de Balmes
