= Pedro Albéniz =

Spanish pianist and composer

Pedro Albéniz y Basanta
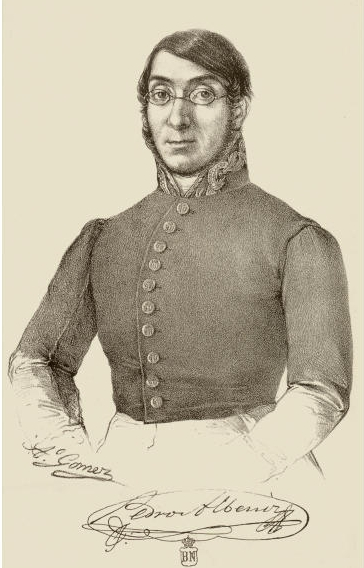
- Born: Pedro Pérez de Albéniz y Basanta; 14 April 1795
- Died: 12 April 1855 (aged 59)

Pedro Albéniz y Basanta (14 April 1795 – 12 April 1855) was a Spanish pianist and composer. He was unrelated to Isaac Albéniz.

== Life ==
Albéniz was born in Logroño, La Rioja. He began his studies with his father Mateo Albéniz, a notable church musician in Spain. He furthered his education in Paris, where he was instructed by eminent teachers and received musical advice from Rossini.

Returning to Spain in 1830, he served as organist at the Church of Santa María in San Sebastián and then became a professor at the Madrid Royal Conservatory, organist of the Capilla Real, and the personal piano teacher of Queen Isabella II. He died in Madrid.

Later in life he neglected his career as a concert pianist and dedicated himself instead to teaching. He left behind many compositions for piano, chamber music and songs, but was subsequently remembered chiefly for his piano method, which was studied by all Spanish pianists at the Madrid Conservatory during the mid-19th century.

== Compositions ==
=== Works for concert band ===
- 1813 Himno - cantado en la ciudad de San Sebastián en obsequio a los Reyes N.N.S.S., dedicadoa sus Magestades, for concert band and great mixed choir
- 1833 Marcha e himno para la jura de la Princesa de Asturias, representada por una comparsa de jóvenes de San Sebastián, for concert band
- 1833 Marcha triunfal, himno y contradanzas de la comparsa alegórica al restablecimiento del Rey N.S. y administración benéfica de S.M. la Reina, egecutada en San Sebastián con acuerdo de su ayuntamiento el domingo de carnaval de 1833, for concert band

=== Choral works ===
- 1841 Villancico real al nacimiento de N.S. Jesucristo, for two soloists, two-voiced choir and piano
- 1842 Villancico real al nacimiento de N.S. Jesucristo, for soloist, unison children's choir and piano
- 1844 Villancico real al nacimiento de N.S. Jesucristo, for soloists, unison choir and piano
- 1845 Villancico real al nacimiento de N.S. Jesucristo, for soloists, mixed choir (STB) and piano

=== Works for piano ===
- 1825 Rondó brillante a la tirana sobre los temas del "Trípoli y la Cachucha", for piano, op. 25
- 1825 Variaciones brillantes sobre el "Himno de Riego", for piano, op. 28
- 1830 Serenata cantada a sos Reyes Nros. Sres. con motivo de su salida de la ciudad de San Sebastián, for piano
- 1831 Fantasía elegante sobre motivos escogidos de la ópera "I puritani" de Vincenzo Bellini, for piano
- 1831 Variaciones brillantes sobre el tema favorito Mira, oh Norma, ai tuoi ginocchi de Vincenzo Bellini, for piano, op. 33
- 1843 Contradanzas bailadas a presencia de S.S.M.M. por una comparsa de jóvenes distinguidos de San Sebastián
- 1843 Vals no.4, for piano
- 1843 Vals no.5, for piano
- 1844 Lucia di Lammermoor, fantasia on a themes from Verdi's opera for piano
- 1852 Corona musical de canciones populares españolas
- 12 estudios melódicos para piano á cuatro manos compuestos espresamente [sic] para S.M. la Reina Doña Ysabel 2ª, op. 56
- El chiste de Málaga - capricho, música característica española, op.37
- El polo nuevo - capricho, música característica española, for piano, op. 41
- Estudios para piano - antología (siglo XIX)
- Fantasia sobre motivos de la ópera "Nabucco" de Giuseppe Verdi, for two pianos, op. 36
- Fantasía sobre motivos de la ópera "Attila" de Giuseppe Verdi, for piano four hands
- Fantasía sobre motivos de la ópera "Ernani" de Giuseppe Verdi, for piano four hands
- Fantasía sobre motivos de la ópera "I Lombardi" de Giuseppe Verdi, for piano four hands
- Fantasía sobre motivos del "Nabucodonosor" de Giuseppe Verdi, for two pianos
- Fantasía sobre un motivo vasco, for piano
- Flores melódicas, for piano, op. 60
- La barquilla gaditana - capricho, música característica española, op.39
- La gracia de Córdoba música característica española, for two pianos, op. 38
- Lied, for piano, op. 53
- Los jardines de Aranjuez, for two pianos
- Mi Delicia, for two pianos, op. 61
- Piezas características españolas, for two pianos
- Riojanos Ilustres
- Rondino-capricho sobre motivos de "La Violeta", for piano, violin, viola, and cello, op. 65

== Bibliography ==
- Santiago de Masarnau Fernández (1805-1882): Piano romántico español (Música impresa) Gemma Salas Villar. Santiago de Masarnau en Pedro Albéniz, Madrid: Instituto Complutense de Ciencias Musicales, 1999. 297 p.
- Antonio Gómez y Cros (1808–1863): Retrato de Pedro Albeniz Basanta. Diana en el Estab. Artistico y Literario, ca. 1850.
