= University of Cervera =

Former Spanish university

- Universitat de Cervera
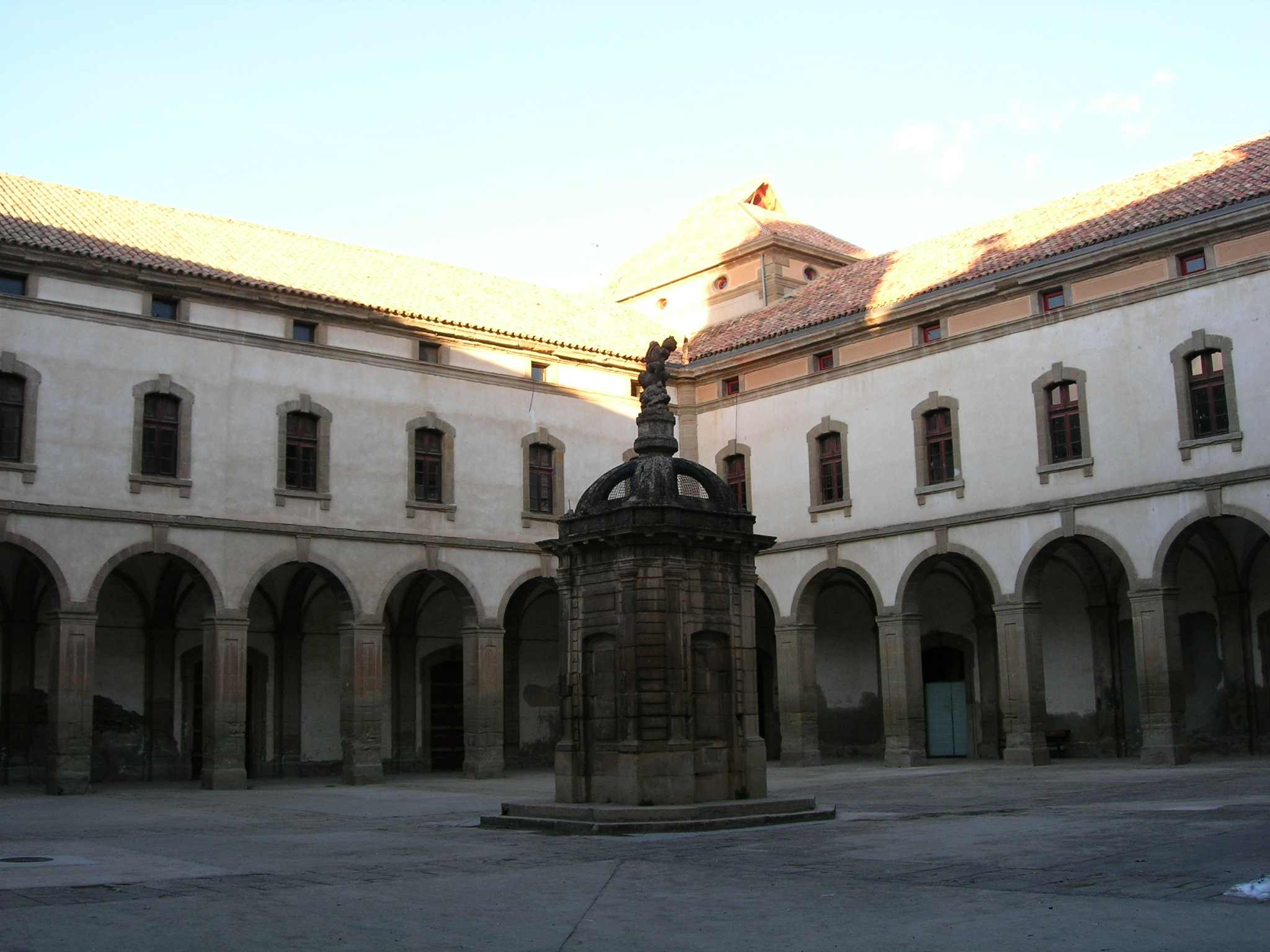
- Main patio of the former building
- Latin: Academia Cervariensis
- Other name: Real y Pontificia Universidad de Cervera
- Active: 1717–1835
- Location: Cervera, Lleida, Catalonia, Spain; 41.67062°N 1.27429°E

The Royal and Pontifical University of Cervera (Spanish: Real y Pontificia Universidad de Cervera) was a Spanish university located in Cervera, Province of Lleida, Catalonia.

== History ==
The institution was founded in 1717 by Philip V of Spain, who sought to compensate Cervera for its supportive stance during the War of the Spanish Succession. Conversely, he also sought to penalize the rest of Catalonia for its support to the Habsburgs. Thus, the six existing universities in the Principality were banned and their faculties disbanded or transferred to Cervera.

By 1767, the influence of the university had decayed and it finally closed its doors in 1835.

On 7 November 1947, the former building of the university, designed by Francesc Soriano and constructed from 1718 to 1740, was declared a cultural monument of national significance by the Spanish government.
