= Antonio García Gutiérrez =

Spanish Romantic dramatist

The Most Excellent Antonio García Gutiérrez
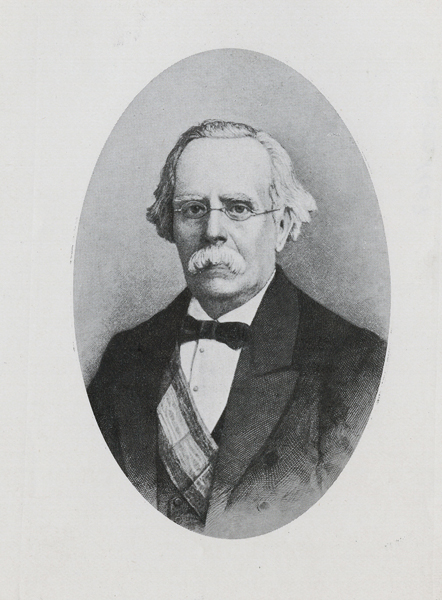
- Born: 5 July 1813; Chiclana de la Frontera, Spain
- Died: 6 August 1884 (aged 71); Madrid, Spain

Seat P of the Real Academia Española
- In office 11 May 1862 – 26 August 1884
- Preceded by: Antonio Gil y Zárate
- Succeeded by: Miguel Mir

Antonio García Gutiérrez (5 July 1813 – 6 August 1884) was a Spanish Romantic dramatist.

== Biography ==
After having studied medicine in his native town, García Gutiérrez moved to Madrid in 1833 and earned a meager living by translating plays of Eugène Scribe and Alexandre Dumas, père. Lacking success, he was on the point of enlisting when he suddenly sprang into fame as the author of a play called El trovador (The Troubadour), which was played for the first time on 1 March 1836. His next great success was Simón Bocanegra, in 1843. His Poesías (1840) and another volume of lyrics, Luz y tinieblas (1842), are comparatively minor, but the versification of his plays, and his power of analysing feminine emotions, have given García Gutiérrez a leading position among the Spanish dramatists of the 19th century.

Although recognized as one of the leaders of the Romantic movement in Spain, his plays were not immediately lucrative, and García Gutiérrez emigrated to Spanish America, working as a journalist in Cuba and Mexico, until 1850, when he returned to Spain.

After his return to Spain in 1850, however, García Gutiérrez became known all over Europe through Giuseppe Verdi's opera Il trovatore (1853), adapted from El trovador. Verdi then adapted Simón Bocanegra into the opera Simon Boccanegra (1857).

The best works of his later period are a zarzuela titled El grumete (1853), La venganza catalana (1864), and Juan Lorenzo (1865). García Gutiérrez became head of the archaeological museum at Madrid, the city where he died.
