= Francisco Camprodón =

Spanish writer

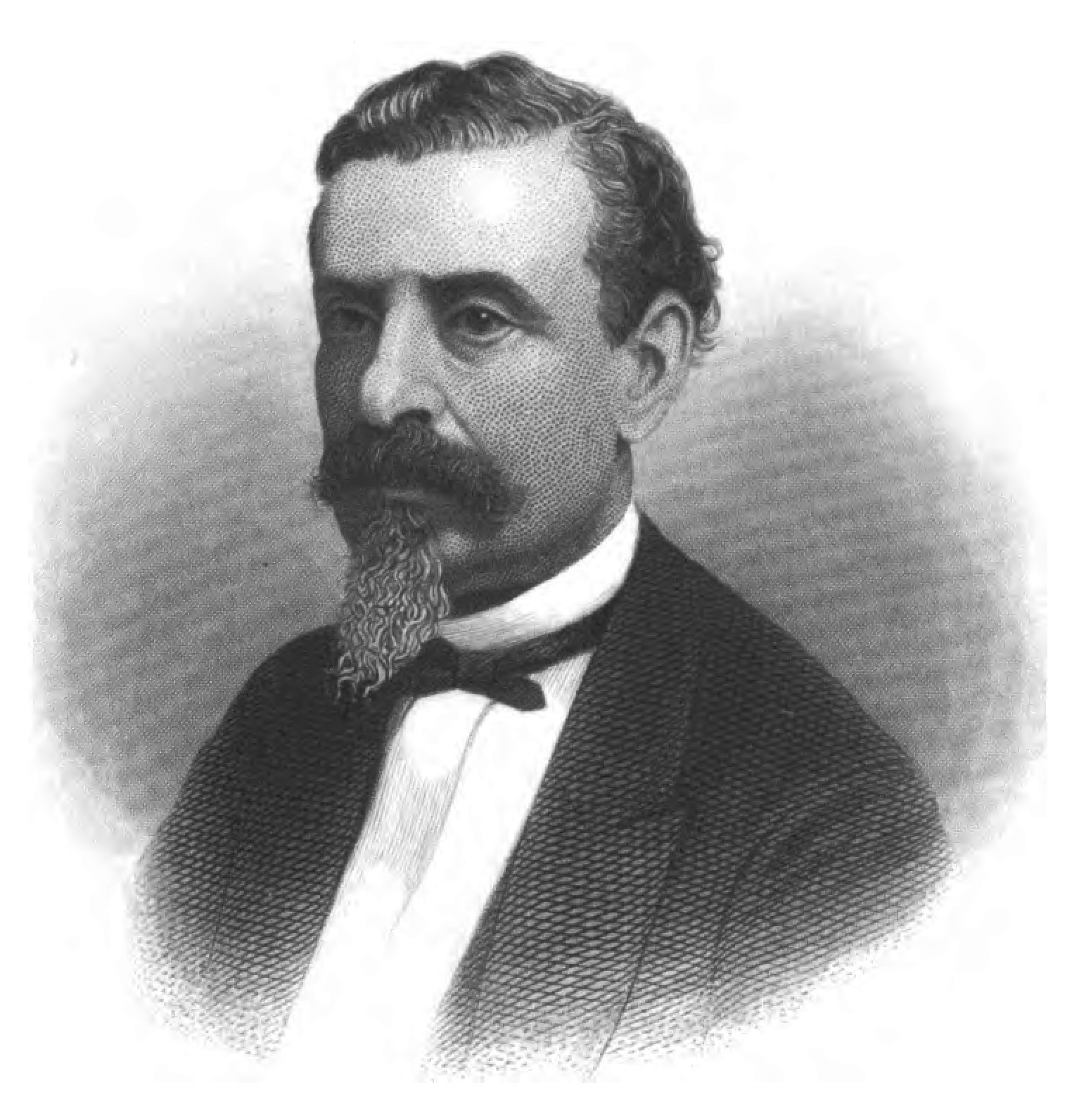
- 1871
- Born: Francisco Camprodón y Safont; 4 March 1816; Vic, Catalonia, Spain
- Died: 16 August 1870 (aged 54); Havana, Cuba
- Education: Cervera; Alcalá; Barcelona
- Occupations: Poet dramatist politician librettist
- Political party: Unión Liberal

Francisco Camprodón y Safont (4 March 1816 – 16 August 1870) was a Spanish playwright, poet, politician and librettist, originally from Catalonia.

== Biography ==
=== Provenance and early years ===
Francisco Camprodón was born in Vic (that time known as Vich), a regional centre and manufacturing town with a focus on textiles, in the hill country roughly 100 kilometres to the north of Barcelona. He enrolled to study Jurisprudence at the University of Cervera, where he was a student near contemporary of the philosopher-theologian Jaime Balmes: the two became close life-long friends. There are suggestions that Camprodón may have contributed to one or some of the early published works of Balmes. Spain did not recover quickly from the "Great War" in which the armies of France and England had competed for control of the peninsular. The University of Cervera was the local university but it had become increasingly run down. During the 1830s it was progressively closed: Camprodón transferred to the University of Alcalá (just outside Madrid) to pursue his law studies before returning to Catalonia to conclude them, receiving his law degree in 1838 from the University of Barcelona.

=== Politics and exile ===
At around the time of his graduation he was hit by a serious health crisis. The doctors were unsure as to its cause, but suspected an aneurysm for which they prescribed cocktails of drugs which, according to one source, came close to killing him. One of the doctors spotted him out with his girlfriend and urgently implored him, "do not marry". Camprodón at this point gave up on the drugs and the medical advice and rapidly returned to the robust good health which he would enjoy virtually till the end of his life. He now turned to politics, linking up with the liberal activists of the time. In the words of a biographer, he now "engaged on politics with greater vehemence than was convenient to the government that was in the ascendancy" at the time. Spain was not a democracy at this time. Camprodón suffered "persecution" and was then exiled to Cádiz on the southern coast, far from the centres of political power and influence.

=== Concepción ===
Before being sent away to Cádiz, Francisco Camprodón found time to marry Concepción Borrell, daughter of Marià Borrell i de Miralpeix, a wealthy Barcelona industrialist and property developer. The marriage was registered in Barcelona on 27 May 1842.

=== Stage dramatist ===
Having received his law degree and survived serious illness, Camprodón had two career vocations: politics and literature. Having been sent south on account of his political activism, he recalled that as a boy he had written verses, and resolved to embark on a writing career. In this he was supported by the young Duke of Montpensier, who became a friend and backer. It was Montpensier who encouraged him to make a collection of his poetry, and a couple of years later, publish some of it in a volume under the title "Emociones". Produced in Barcelona, the volume was well received by critics and readers, helping to establish Camprodón's reputation as a writer.

Another friend from his time in Cádiz was the stage actor José Valero: the idea that he might find a wider audience as a writer for the theatre began to form in his mind. During the early 1850s his exile seems to have lapsed. That year, taking a walk with friends in Barcelona, someone suggested he should turn his hand to a stage comedy. During the evening he began work on the drama that would become "Flor de un día" ("The flower of a day"): he began with the final act of the play. The Teatro Español in Madrid had been reopened (and renamed) in 1849, with a series of practical enhancements which seemed to reflect and adumbrate a sustained theatre revival in Spain during the middle and later decades of the nineteenth century: for Camprodón that provided an added spur to his work on the stage play. Some time later Camprodón found himself in Madrid on an unrelated matter and took himself to the theatre, where he took the opportunity to visit Valero. In the actor's room backstage, he found that his friend already had a visitor in the form of the successful dramatist Tomás Rodríguez Rubí. "This fellow writes very good poems", Valero told Rubi, indicating Camprodón. Perhaps predictably, Rubi was more interested to know whether the new-comer had any stage comedies available: comedies were in short supply. Camprodón admitted he had an unpublished stage comedy in a bottom drawer, and in response to further questioning he agreed that it was, as far as he could tell, good.

It turned out that Camprodón had excellent recall of the work, and he was able to talk Rubi through the drama in very great detail. It was a long night, even by Madrid standards, and ended in a lengthy walk through the streets during which Camprodón completed his exposition of the drama to Rubi. They parted at two in the morning, with nothing more committal from Rubi that a cheerful "Hasta mañana!" ("Till tomorrow!"). Nevertheless, relatively shortly after that, probably during 1851 and at the insistence both of Valero and of Rubí, that "Flor de un día" was stage in Madrid to widespread acclaim. It is, indeed, widely viewed as Camprodón's most successful stage drama. A consistent timeline is hard to infer from the various sources, but the drama probably had its premiere at Madrid's Teatro Español during February 1851. It is a mark of Camprodón's commercial acumen and, perhaps, of the play's popularity that he broke with what was then the tradition by refusing to surrender future productions rights for the play to the theatre. From approximately 1854 Francisco Camprodón based himself in Madrid. A second stage work, "Espinas de una flor" ("Thorns of a flower") was premiered at the "Teatro del Drama" in 1852, followed by others as the decade progressed.

=== Parliament ===
The move to Madrid coincided with a return to political engagement. Camprodón emerged as a prominent member of the Liberal Union ("Unión Liberal"), a centrist monarchist political grouping which was assuming features of a modern political party and which, from 1858, was backed by a majority in the Spanish parliament ("Cortes Generales") for a decade. Camprodón became one of the Liberal Union deputies, representing Barcelona and Santa Coloma de Farners, in 1854. He remained a member for five years, and attended party congresses over a period of ten years between 1856 and 1865. He would be remembered as a relatively independently minded party member. Overall, however, his impact on Madrid during the 1850s was more as a fashionably romanticist playwright and poet than as a politician.

=== Zarzuela ===
It is nevertheless neither for his contributions in parliament nor for his stage plays that Francisco Camprodón would be best remembered, but for his contributions as a Zarzuela librettist. The Zarzuela genre alternates between spoken and sung sections, thereby according greater importance to the script than other forms of music drama such as opera. Some of his better known works were "El dominó azul" ("Blue Sunday"), "Jaque al Rey" ("Checkmate") and "El diablo en el poder" ("The Devil in Charge"). Probably the most successful of them all was "Marina", with music by Emilio Arrieta, which had its premiere at the Teatro del Circo in Madrid in 1855. (After Camprodón's death the libretto was updated, and "Marina" was reconfigured as an opera. Beyond the theatre, Camprodón's was inspired by the Africa War of 1859/60 to publish his "Carta a don Juan Prim", an adulatory "letter" addressed to the hero of Los Castillejos, in the form of a series of Quadrillas. The work resonated widely, capturing the mood of the moment.

The composers with whom Camprodón principally worked were Emilio Arrieta, Francisco Asenjo Barbieri, Cristóbal Oudrid and Nicolau Manent.

=== Final years ===
During his final years, as the "Renaixença" (Catalan revival) gathered momentum, he wrote several stage plays in Catalan, such as "La teta gallinaire" (1865, "Aunt Hen") and "La tornada d'en Titó" (1867, "The Uncle returns"). After the triumph of the Glorious Revolution in 1868 he accepted a senior administrative job in Cuban, and made his way to the territory. In Cuba he contributed several articles in the newly launched Catalan language magazine, La Gresca. La Gresca was published in Havana. It was in Havana that Francisco Camprodón died on 15 August 1870.
