= Luis de Olona =

Luis de Olona y Gaeta (Málaga, 1823 – Barcelona, 1863) was a playwright, theater impresario and librettist of a number of Spanish zarzuelas by the mid of 19th-century Spain. He was a very prolific playwright, writing comedies, farces and operettas, arranged by famous composers of the zarzuela genre. His theatrical approach is said to be very weak in construction and plentiful in improbabilities, so much that it was largely criticized by Narciso Díaz de Escovar and Francisco Javier Lasso de la Vega.

Luis de Olona, brother to José de Olona, lived a bohemian life in his native Málaga before settling in Madrid, where he directed small theaters and worked in the press. He also collaborated with artists such as Mariano Pina y Bohigas, Valladares Garriga and Antonio García Gutiérrez. Among some of his titles are the comedy El primo y el relicario (1843), the drama El caudillo de Zamora (1847), and the comic-drama Las dos carteras (1851). Other works of his include zarzuelas Galanteos en Venecia (1853), El sargento Federico (1855), El postillón de La Rioja (1856) by Cristóbal Oudrid, with whom he worked from 1851 to 1856, Casado y soltero (1858), Los circasianos (1860), and Joaquín Gaztambide's El juramento (1858).
