= Teatro de la Zarzuela =

Theater in Madrid, Spain

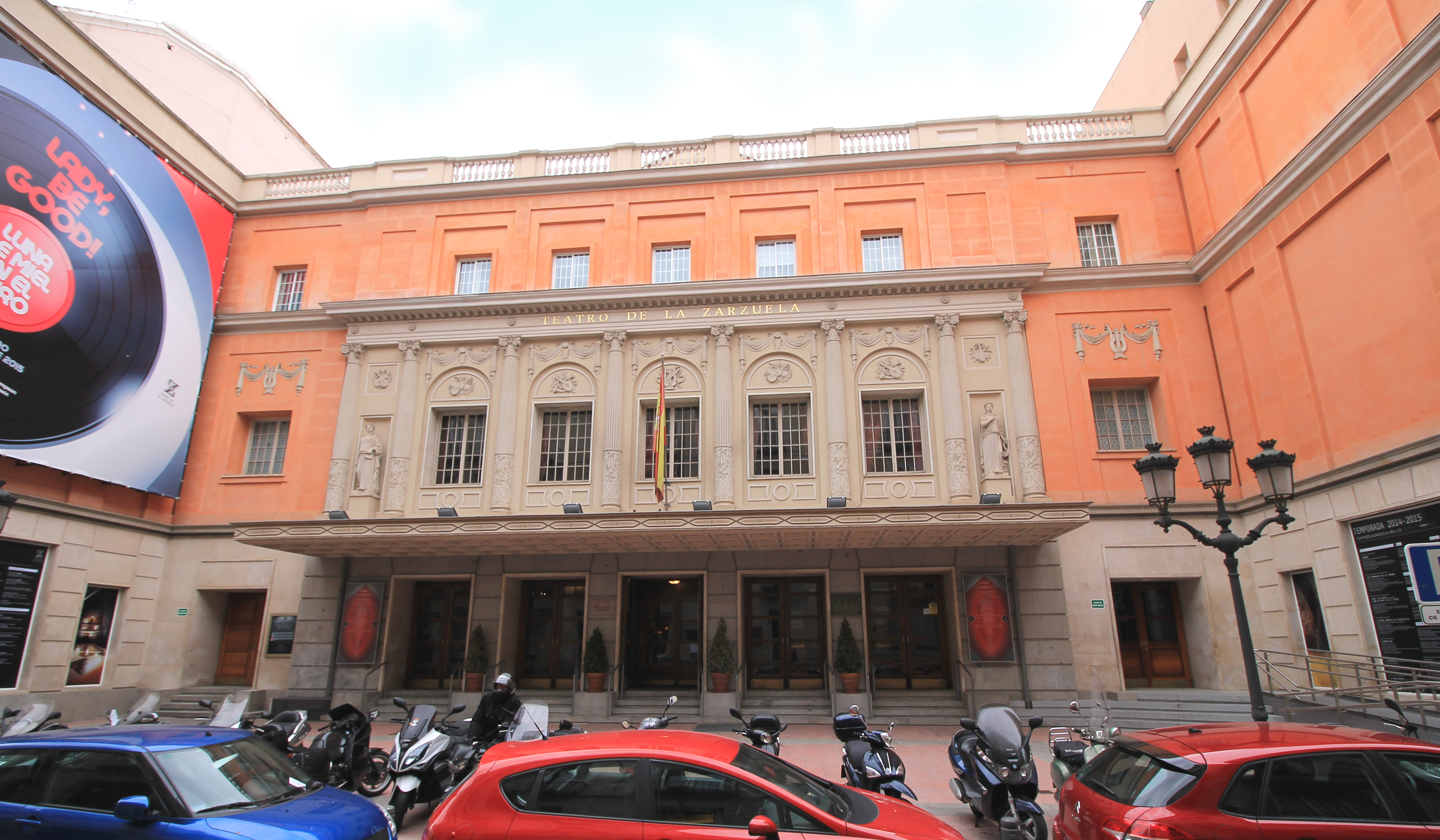
- Main façade of the Teatro de la Zarzuela
- Interactive map of Teatro de la Zarzuela
- Location: Madrid, Spain
- Coordinates: 40.417185°N 3.696782°W
- Capacity: 1,242 seats

Construction
- Opened: 10 October 1856
- Reopened: 1914
- Rebuilt: 1910–1913
- Architects: Jerónimo de la Gándara; José María Sánchez Guallart

Spanish Cultural Heritage
- Type: Non-movable
- Criteria: Monument
- Designated: 4 March 1994
- Reference no.: RI-51-0008693

The Teatro de la Zarzuela is a theatre in Madrid, Spain. The theatre is today mainly devoted to zarzuela (the Spanish traditional musical theatre genre), as well as operetta and recitals.

== History ==
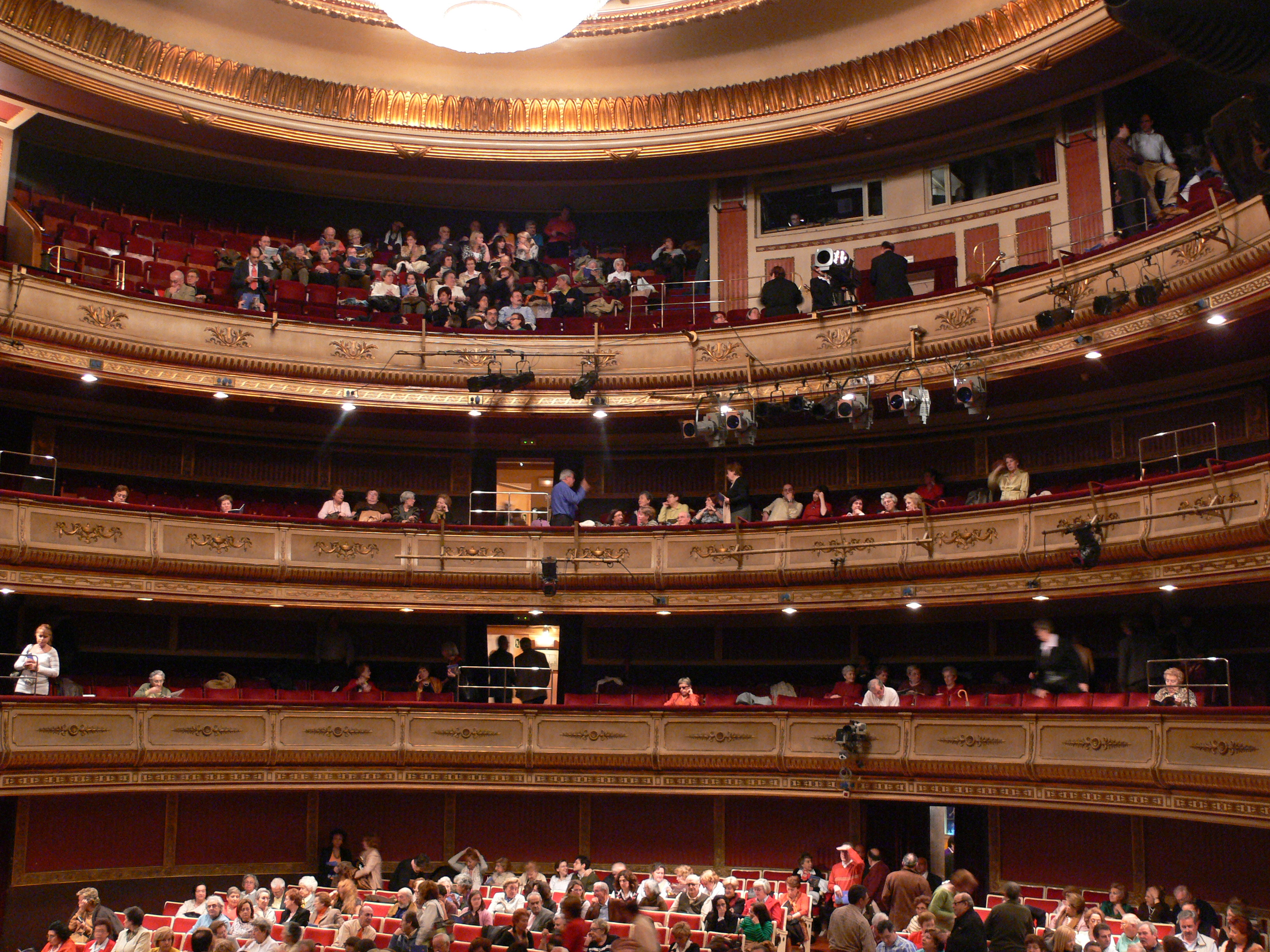
Auditorium of the Teatro de la Zarzuela

The theatre was designed by architect Jerónimo de la Gándara and built by José María Sánchez Guallart on the initiative of the Spanish Lyrical Company to provide a space for performances of operettas in the Spanish capital. It was modelled on the La Scala theatre in Milan with its three-level horseshoe form and opened to the public on 10 October 1856, the birthday of Queen Isabella II. The name refers to zarzuela, a theatre form that alternates spoken and sung scenes. Its promoters were established masters of the genre such as Francisco Asenjo Barbieri, Joaquín Gaztambide, Rafael Hernando, José Inzenga, baritono Francisco de Salas, librettist Luis de Olona and composer Cristóbal Oudrid, under Francisco de las Rivas, an important banker.

In the second half of the nineteenth century, Teatro de la Zarzuela became Madrid's leading zarzuela theatre, staging many of the great masterworks. On November 9, 1909 the building was virtually destroyed by fire. The rebuild by Cesareo Iradier reduced the amount of wood and metal, and in 1914 Maestro Luna raised the curtain with his orchestra to reopen the theatre. With the Teatro Real opera house closed from 1925 to 1997, Teatro de la Zarzuela remained Madrid's leading venue throughout the period and hosted most major opera events. The theatre's resident ensemble is the Community of Madrid Orchestra.

The ceiling originally featured magnificent works by the painters Francisco Hernández Tomé and Manuel Castellanos, but these were destroyed in renovations and structural changes that were made in 1956. The theatre then was acquired by the Sociedad General de Autores, although much of the facade and interior ornamentation was lost. Later it became the property of the state. In 1984 the Ministry of Culture, with Madrid still lacking an opera house, expanded the range of activities beyond zarzuela and opera to encompass flamenco and other dance. The building was given heritage status in 1994, and in 1998 was again remodelled, restoring much of the original structure and form.

In 1998 the theatre performed a celebrated revival of Federico Chueca's zarazuela La Gran Vía.

== See also ==
- Community of Madrid Orchestra
- Zarzuela
- Spanish National Dance Company
- Ballet Nacional de España
- Teatro Real
