= Patricio de la Escosura =

Spanish writer (1807–1878)

The Most Excellent Patricio de la Escosura
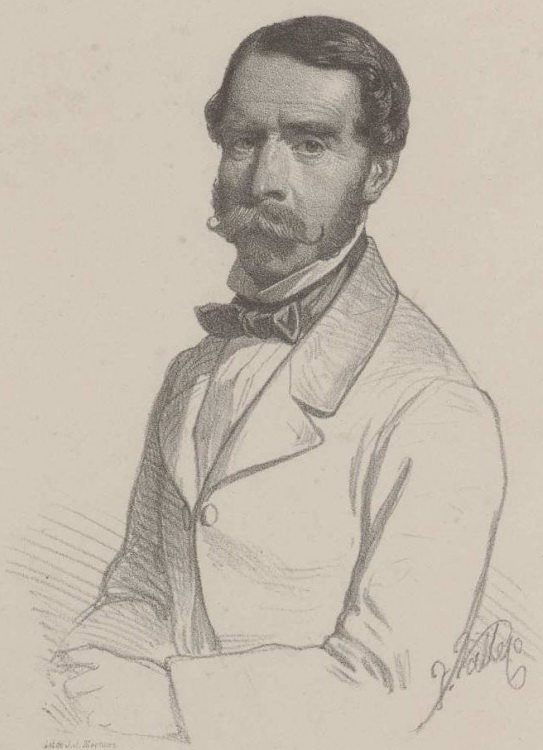
- Portrait (1854)
- Born: Patricio de la Escosura Morrogh; 5 September 1807; Madrid, Spain
- Died: 22 January 1878 (aged 70); Madrid, Spain

Seat G of the Real Academia Española
- In office 25 February 1847 – 22 January 1878
- Preceded by: Vicente González Arnao
- Succeeded by: Emilio Alcalá-Galiano

Patricio de la Escosura Morrogh (5 September 1807–22 January 1878) was a Spanish politician, journalist, playwright and author associated with the Romantic school.

== Biography ==
Brother of the journalist and playwright Narciso de la Escosura and the engineer Luis de la Escosura y Morrogh, he was a first cousin of the magistrate and writer Francisco de la Escosura Hevia. He was deputy for Palencia, Zaragoza, Oviedo and Cádiz (1846–1871), senator for Córdoba (1872–1873) and member of the Royal Spanish Academy.

He was Minister of the Interior for 5 weeks in 1847 and for 6 months in 1856.

He was also Minister Plenipotentiary for Spain in Portugal (1855) and Germany (1872–1874).

Between 1842 and 1844, Artistic and Monumental Spain was published in Paris, a masterpiece of Spanish romanticism, with descriptive texts by Patricio de la Escosura and large plates by the painter Jenaro Pérez de Villaamil. He also wrote narrative poems imitating his friend Espronceda, such as the legend about the Comuneros El bulto vestido de negro capuz (1835), and, influenced by Walter Scott, several historical and non-historical novels, among others Ni rey ni Roque (1835), El Conde de Candespina (1832), El patriarca del valle (1846), Memorias de un coronel retirado (1868, autobiographical).

As a novelist his narrative tempo is rather slow and he does not document his works sufficiently. As a critic and researcher he published Estudios históricos sobre las costumbres españolas (1851), Manual de mitología (1845) and a study on the theater of Pedro Calderón de la Barca: Ensayo crítico sobre la vida y el teatro de don Pedro Calderón, a study that prefaces his edition of the Teatro escogido del gran autor áureo.
