= José Inzenga =

Spanish composer

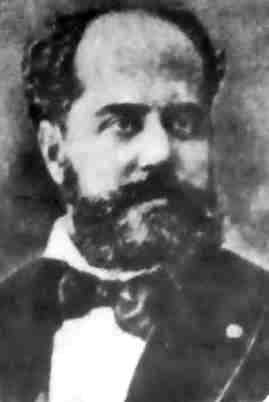
José Inzenga y Castellanos (1828–1891), Spanish composer

José Inzenga y Castellanos (Madrid, 3 June 1828 – 28 June 1891) was a Spanish composer of zarzuelas and professor at the Conservatory of Madrid and academic of the Real Academia de Bellas Artes de San Fernando and one of the pioneers of folkloric studies and the modern zarzuela in the second half of the 19th century.

== Biography ==
Inzenga was the son of Italian singing master Ángel Inzenga and Felicia Castellanos. He studied music at the Madrid Royal Conservatory. He then traveled to Paris, where he pursued extended training in music, winning two silver medals in harmony and piano playing. He joined the circle of the Liceo Artístico y Literario de Madrid, founded in 1837, serving on its board of directors and thereby contributing the production of works and organizing jam sessions.

The Revolutions of 1848 forced him to return to Spain, where he soon began composing operettas. From that time on his activity increased since he not only composed, but also took part in the musical life of Madrid. He co-founded the Gazeta Musical in 1855 and the Sociedad Artístico Musical de Socorros Mutuos, Teatro del Circo, and the creation of Teatro de la Zarzuela.
