= Juan Eugenio Hartzenbusch =

Spanish dramatist (1806–1880)

The Most Excellent Juan Eugenio Hartzenbusch
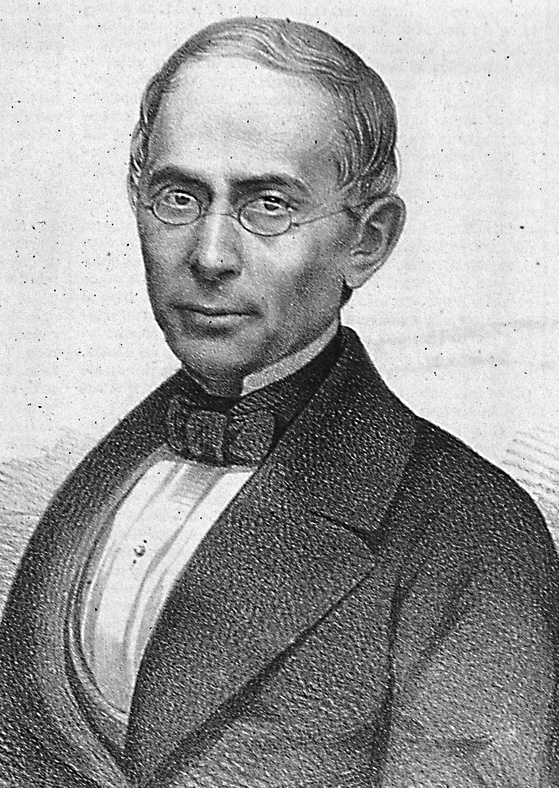
- Born: Juan Eugenio Hartzenbusch Martínez; 6 September 1806; Madrid, Spain
- Died: 2 August 1880 (aged 73); Madrid, Spain

Seat l of the Real Academia Española
- In office 7 November 1847 – 2 August 1880
- Preceded by: Seat established
- Succeeded by: Marcelino Menéndez y Pelayo

Juan Eugenio Hartzenbusch Martínez (6 September 1806 – 2 August 1880) was a Spanish dramatist. He was the Director of the National Library of Spain until he retired in 1875.

== Biography ==
Hartzenbusch was born in Madrid, Spain. His father was a German furniture carpenter and his mother a Spanish woman with the name María Josefa Martínez Calleja. Hartzenbusch's childhood was spent as an apprentice in his father's shop in order to become a cabinet-maker. He studied French 1815-1818 and then took a four-year course in the Jesuit College of San Isidro el Real in Madrid where he studied principally rhetoric, Latin, and philosophy. He followed his father's trade until 1830, when he learned shorthand and joined the staff of the Gaceta. He married Doña María Bernardina Morgue in 1830. She died in 1836. His earliest dramatic essays were translations from Molière, Voltaire and Alexandre Dumas, père; he then turned to adapting old Spanish plays, and in 1837 produced his first original play, Los amantes de Teruel, the subject of which had previously been used by Andrés Rey de Artieda, Tirso de Molina and Juan Pérez de Montalbán. Los amantes de Teruel at once made the author's reputation, but Doña Mencía (1840) and Alfonso el Casto (1841) were disappointments; it was not until 1845 that he repeated his former success with La jura en Santa Gadea.

In 1900, Don Eugenio Hartzenbusch, Juan's son, published Bibliografía in Madrid, which provides a concise list of his father's writings. The record includes approximately 15 collections, including various editions of his works, 94 dramatic works, 236 poems 231 fables in verse, 19 addresses, 8 biographical articles, 15 stories, 14 articles on manners and customs, 9 works of literary criticism, 3 works of dramatic criticism, 33 prologues, 22 notes and articles on Don Quixote, 22 miscellaneous articles, and 9 works by other authors collected and annotated.

Hartzenbusch was the chief librarian at the Biblioteca Nacional, National Library, from 1862 to 1875, and was an indefatigable editor of many national classics. Inferior in inspiration to other contemporary Spanish dramatists, Hartzenbusch excelled his rivals in versatility and in conscientious workmanship.

As a member of the Real Academia Española, he edited works from Tirso de Molina (12 vols., Madrid, 1839–42), Calderón de la Barca (4 vols., 1849–51), Juan Ruiz de Alarcón (1852), and Lope de Vega (4 vols., 1853), among others.

After retiring from the National Library in 1875, his strength of body and mind began to give way, and after losing his second wife, Salvadora Hiriart, he failed rapidly and died at his home in Madrid on 2 August 1880. The Real Academia Española, the Spanish Academy, did him the honor of accompanying his body to its last resting place, the Cementerio de la Sacramental de San Ginés y San Luis.
