= Ventura de la Vega =

Argentine playwright and writer (1807–1865)

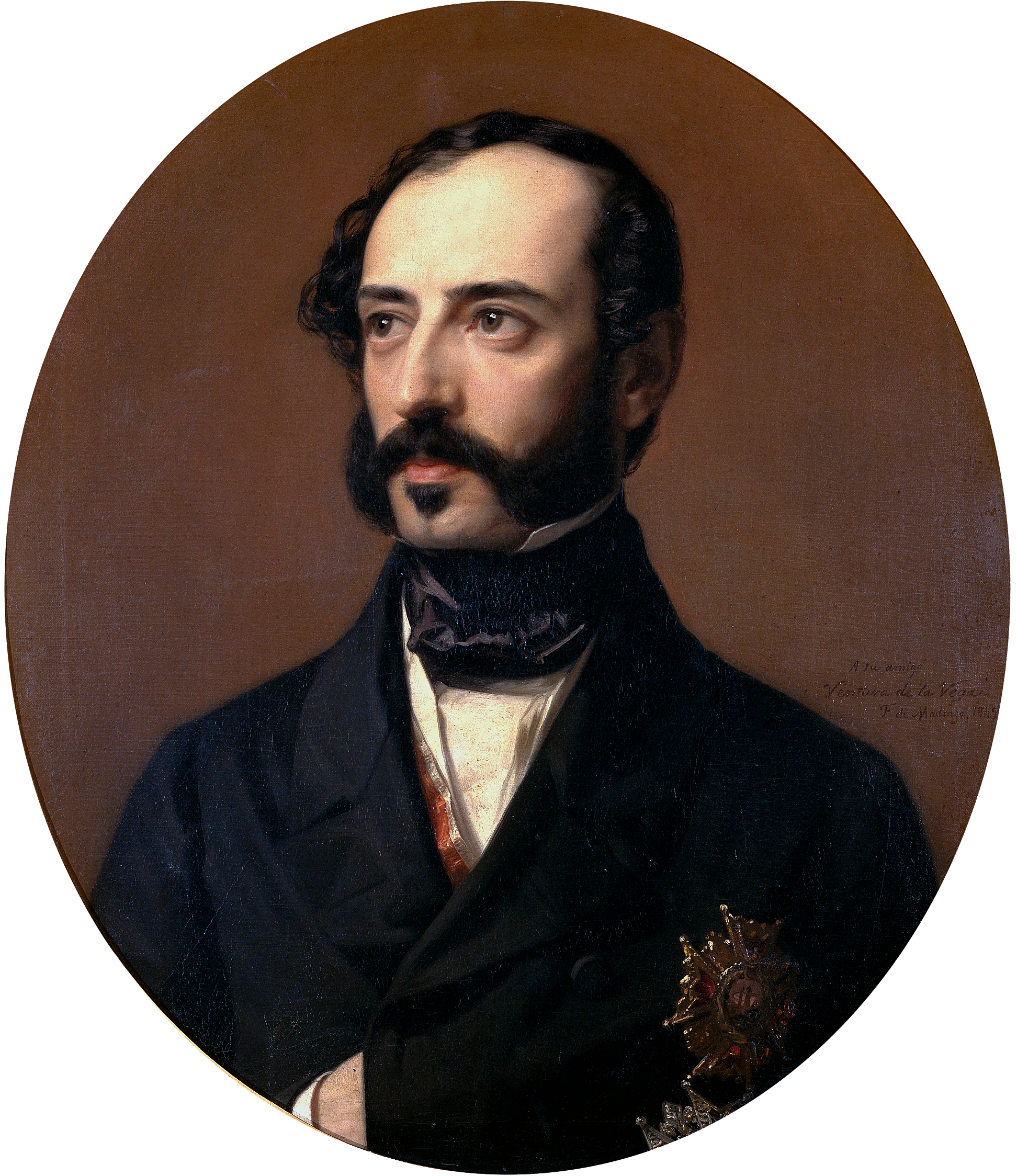
- Born: July 14, 1807; Buenos Aires, Viceroyalty of the Río de la Plata
- Died: November 29, 1865 (aged 58); Madrid, Spain

Buenaventura José María de la Vega y Cárdenas (July 14, 1807 – November 29, 1865), more commonly known as Ventura de la Vega, was an Argentinian writer, poet, and literary critic. He is best known for his comedy The Man of the World (El Hombre de Mundo).

He was born in the city of Buenos Aires, then the capital of the Viceroyalty of the Río de la Plata, on July 14, 1807. Vega went to Spain in 1818 for his education and never returned to his home country. Alongside his friends José de Espronceda and Patricio de la Escosura, he formed a secret society named "Los Numantinos" that conspired against Ferdinand VII and intended to avenge the death of Rafael del Riego.

He married Spanish opera singer Manuela Oreiro Lema de Vega. Their son Ricardo de la Vega was also a writer.

He was director of the Teatro Español in 1849. He was also a contributing author to the Enciclopedia moderna.

A portrait of his by Federico de Madrazo y Kuntz is in the Museo del Prado. There is also a street named after him in Madrid.

== Works ==
=== Plays ===
- The Man of the World (El Hombre de Mundo), 1845
- Ferdinand of Antequera (Don Fernando el de Antequera), 1847
- The Death of Caesar (La Muerte de César), 1865

=== Libretti ===
- Jugar con fuego
- El estreno de una artista
