= El barberillo de Lavapiés =

1874 zarzuela by Francisco Asenjo Barbieri

- Zarzuela by Francisco Asenjo Barbieri
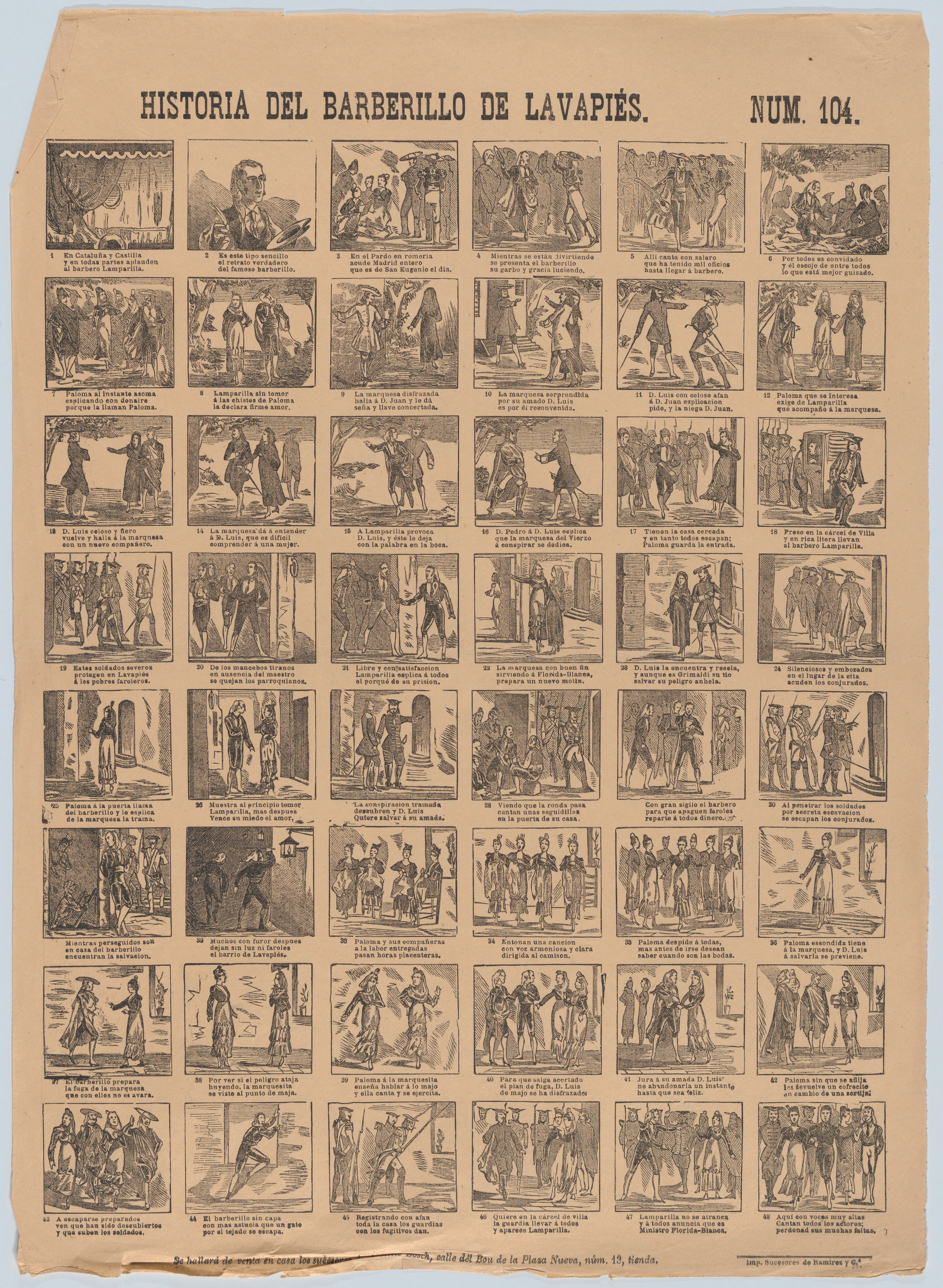
- Broadside with 48 scenes c. 1860–70
- Librettist: Luis Mariano de Larra
- Language: Spanish
- Premiere: 18 December 1874; Teatro de la Zarzuela, Madrid

El barberillo de Lavapiés, Op. 56, is a zarzuela in three acts by Francisco Asenjo Barbieri. The libretto, in Spanish, is by Luis Mariano de Larra. The first performance took place at the Teatro de la Zarzuela in Madrid on 18 December 1874, and it became one of the most well-known zarzuelas. Translated as The Little Barber of Lavapiés, the title refers to the occupation of one of the main characters and the humble and neglected area of the Spanish capital called Lavapiés where it is set.

== Background ==
Barbieri had already found success in the zarzuela genre with the pieces Jugar con fuego (Playing with fire) in 1851 and Pan y toros (Bread and bulls) in 1864 and would eventually compose around 70 zarzuelas. Numbers in El barberillo de Lavapiés such as the song for Paloma "Como nací en la calle de la Paloma", Lamparilla's patter songs as well as the jota and seguidilla became familiar in Spanish musical culture. De Larra's libretto is considered to be successful and well-constructed, echoing Scribe in some respects.

The work was particularly admired by Manuel de Falla, who described Pan y toros and El barberillo de Lavapiés as Barbieri's most outstanding theatrical works "which reflect the rhythmic-melodic character of Spanish song and dance at the end of the eighteenth century and the beginning of the nineteenth", and which "undoubtedly exerted an influence on Spanish composers, shaping certain unmistakable features we find in our music from about the middle of the last century until Albéniz and Granados". In his book on operetta, Traubner claims that the score is the greatest 19th century zarzuela, possessing a "joyous" score with no dull moments, and while with a Spanish accent, echoes of opéra comique or opera buffa.

== Performance history ==
Outside Spain the work has been produced in Germany under the title Lamparilla, while in England it was broadcast in 1954 by the BBC in a version by Geoffrey Dunn, with amended instrumentation by Roberto Gerhard and a cast that included Maria Perilli and Bruce Boyce as Paloma and Lamparilla, Marjorie Westbury and Thomas Round as the Marquesita and Don Luis, with Ian Wallace as Don Juan, conducted by Stanford Robinson, and issued on CDs in 2020. Christof Loy directed a production at Theater Basel in October 2025, conducted by José Miguel Pérez-Sierra.

There have been several recordings, complete conducted by Ataúlfo Argenta (1955), Federico Moreno Torroba (1969) and Víctor Pablo Pérez (1994), and of excerpts.

== Roles ==
Roles, voice types, premiere cast
Role	Voice type	Premiere cast, 18 December 1874 Conductor: Francisco Barbieri
Lamparilla	tenor	Miguel Tormo
Paloma	mezzo-soprano	Dolores Franco de Salas
Estrella, La Marquesita de Bierzo, the Infanta's lady-in-waiting	soprano	Cecilia Delgado
Don Luis de Haro	tenor	Rosendo Dalmau
Don Juan de Peralta	baritone	Loitia
Don Pedro, captain	bass	Edo
Lope, Lamparilla's assistant	spoken	González
A sergeant	spoken	Jordá
Chorus: Students, young women, tradespeople, seamstresses, apprentice barbers, guards

== Synopsis ==
The action takes place in Madrid, 1766 and is based partially on history.

=== Act 1 ===
In El Pardo park, festive crowds of peddlers, young lovers and students bustle around. The dentist-barber Lamparilla enters and sings of his career before aiming his comments at the government. Paloma comes on next, singing. Although Lamparilla loves her, she just flirts back at him. Next the Marquesita enters incognito for a secret meeting with Don Juan de Peralta, a fellow conspirator in a plot of the Infanta to get rid of the unpopular prime minister Grimaldi and to replace him with Floridablanca. Before they can retire for discussions, Don Luis, the nephew of Grimaldi and her fiancé, arrives. He notices the Marquesita with Juan and fetches guards to challenge him. A duel seems likely.

La Marquesita asks her seamstress La Paloma what to do to help save Juan, explaining the situation. Lamparilla joins them and they agree to dress her up in festive garb as a distant cousin to effect her escape. When Luis returns, Lamparilla leads a veiled woman away, into a neighbouring house. When the police come to the inn, Lamparilla at first diverts attention, but when Luis tells Don Pedro, the guards' commander, of the conspiracy, a sedan chair is carried on to take the prisoners. But when it leaves, it is Lamparilla who peeks out between the curtains.

=== Act 2 ===
In the Plaza de Lavapiés, the locals gossip about the disappearance of Lamparilla while guards keep watch. The barber suddenly appears, claiming that he was only held for smashing up street lamps. Paloma meets La Marquesita and thanks her for the money which was used to bribe the jailer, and the Marquesita tries to get Lamparilla to be part of the plot against Grimaldi. She asks Lamparilla to get some louts to destroy the street lamps and divert the guards' attention.

Don Luis arrives to talk of love to the Marquesita, suspecting her of being unfaithful. She refuses to see him for four days, then joins the conspirators next door. Luis comes back in disguise with the other plotters. Paloma and Lamparilla are alone when they notice masked men going into La Marquesita's house. Don Luis and Don Pedro arrive to prepare to snatch them. When the troublemakers come to smash the lamps, Lamparilla begins to sing a seguidille to distract the guards. As the guards prepare to grab the plotters, Paloma warns La Marquesita who is just able to escape through adjoining shops with the co-conspirators. The acts closes in confusion as the guards cannot decide whether to chase the plotters or arrest the troublemakers.

=== Act 3 ===
In Paloma's attic workshop the seamstresses sing while they work. Since the conspiracy was uncovered Paloma has not been able to see La Marquesita. She secretly hatches her plan to allow Marquesita and Don Luis to flee in disguise from Madrid. Lamparilla has made the final preparations and brings in Don Luis in his finery. They all anticipate the journey out to the country.

Just in time, the four hide in Paloma's chamber as Don Pedro and his guards burst in. But Paloma and the noble couple are soon caught. However, Lamparilla has fled across the rooftops and he rushes back in to announce that Grimaldi has been removed and that Floridablanca now replaces him as prime minister. As a nephew of Grimaldi, Don Luis is forced to go into exile but La Marquesita decides to join him, while Lamparilla and Paloma pledge their mutual love. All ends in joy and happiness.

== Musical numbers ==
Act 1

- Preludio, Chorus: "Dicen que en el Pardo, madre"
- Entrance of Lamparilla: "Salud, dinero y bellotas"
- Entrance of Paloma: "Como nací en la calle de la Paloma"
- Trio (La Marquesita, Don Luis and Don Juan): "¡Este es el sitio!"
- Trio (La Marquesita, Paloma and Lamparilla): "¡Lamparilla! ¡Servidor!"
- Jota de Los Estudiantes and Final: "Ya los estudiantes madre"

Act 2

- Escena: "Aquí está la ronda"
- Relato de Lamparilla: "Mil gracias vecinos"
- Duo (La Marquesita and Don Luis): "En una casa solariega"
- Duo (Paloma and Lamparilla): "Una mujer que quiere"
- Seguidillas Manchegas: "En el templo de marte"
- Final: "¡La puerta de esta casa!"

Act 3

- Introducción and Coplas de las costureras: "El noble gremio"
- Intermedio
- Duo (Paloma and La Marquesita): "Aquí estoy vestida"
- Quartet (La Marquesita, Paloma, Don Luis and Lamparilla): "El sombrero hasta las cejas"
- Caleseras de Lavapiés: "En entrando una maja"
- Chorus: "¡Aquí están los que buscamos!"
- Final: "En entrando una maja"
