= Böhl =

Böhl may refer to:

- Böhl, part of Böhl-Iggelheim, a municipality in the Rhein-Pfalz-Kreis, in Rhineland-Palatinate, Germany
- Böhl (surname)
