= Mariano José de Larra =

Spanish romantic writer

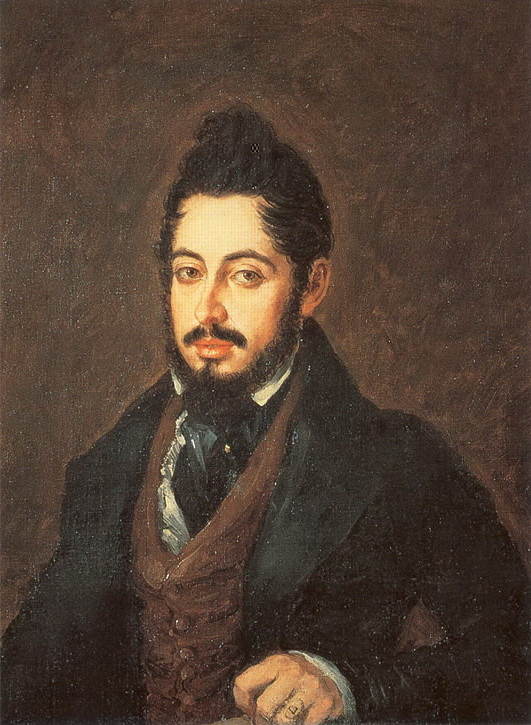
- Portrait by José Gutiérrez de la Vega
- Born: Mariano José de Larra y Sánchez de Castro; 24 March 1809; Madrid, Spain
- Died: 13 February 1837 (aged 27); Madrid, Spain
- Occupations: Journalist, novelist, playwright, politician
- Children: Baldomera Larra Wetoret, Luis Mariano de Larra

Mariano José de Larra y Sánchez de Castro (24 March 1809 – 13 February 1837) was a Spanish romantic writer and journalist best known for his numerous essays and his infamous suicide. His works were often satirical and critical of the 19th-century Spanish society, and focused on both the politics and customs of his time.

Larra lived long enough to prove himself a great prose-writer during the 19th century. He wrote at great speed with the constant fear of censor before his eyes, although no sign of haste is discernible in his work. His political instinct, his abundance of ideas and his forcible, mordant style would possibly have given him one of the foremost positions in Spain. In 1901, members of the Generation of '98 including Miguel de Unamuno and Pío Baroja brought flowers to his grave in homage to his thought and influence.

== Biography ==
He was born in Madrid on 24 March 1809. His father, Mariano de Larra y Langelot, served as a regimental doctor in the French Army, and, as an afrancesado, was compelled to leave the peninsula with his family in 1812. In 1817 Larra returned to Spain, knowing less Spanish than French. His nature was disorderly, his education was imperfect, and, after futile attempts to obtain a degree in medicine or law, he entered an imprudent marriage at the age of twenty, broke ties with his relatives, and became a journalist.

On 13 August 1829, Larra married Josefa Wetoret Velasco. They had a son and two younger daughters, but their marriage did not go well. He discovered that his third child, whom later notoriously became the lover of King Amadeus, was not his—exposing infidelity in their marriage. Larra divorced his wife shortly afterward.

On 27 April 1831 he produced his first play, No más mostrador, based on two pieces by Scribe and Dieulafoy. On 24 September 1834 he produced Macías, a play based on his own historical novel, El doncel de don Enrique el Doliente (1834).

In 1833, Larra worked translating French theater plays for Juan Grimaldi, and even began writing his own. This year was also crucial because he met Dolores Armijo, a married woman who had already had a son. They began a relationship, even though they were both married.

The drama and novel were interesting as experiments, but Larra was essentially a journalist, and the increased liberty of the press after the death of Ferdinand VII gave his caustic talent an ampler field. He was already famous under the pseudonyms of Juan Pérez de Munguía and Fígaro which he used in El Pobrecito Hablador and La Revista Española respectively. Madrid laughed at his grim humour; ministers feared his vitriolic pen and courted him assiduously; he defended Liberalism against the Carlist rebellion; he was elected as deputy for Ávila, and a great career seemed to lie before him, but the era of military pronunciamientos ruined his personal prospects and patriotic plans.

His constant disappointment in society and politics, added to the pain caused by the end of his relationship with Dolores Armijo, had an influence on his writing, which became pessimistic and took on a more sombre tinge.

Finally, on 13 February 1837, Dolores Armijo, accompanied by her sister-in-law, visited Larra to let him know that there was no chance of the two resuming their relationship. The two women had barely left the house when the writer committed suicide by gunshot. He is buried in the Cementerio de San Justo.

== Influence ==
- Some of his phrases like Vuelva usted mañana (come back tomorrow) or Escribir en España es llorar (To write in Spain is to cry) are still applied to chastise present-day ills.
- The Spanish-language clone of the Slashdot Internet forum, Barrapunto, uses Pobrecito Hablador ("Poor little talker") as the name for anonymous posters.
- The Premio Mariano José de Larra rewards young outstanding journalists in Spain.
- The national Museum of Romanticism in Madrid has items relating to Mariano José de Larra.
- He is a frequent reference point among Spanish writers, including Francisco Umbral (Larra, anatomía de un dandy, 1965), Francisco Nieva (Sombra y quimera de Larra, 1976), Antonio Buero Vallejo (La detonación, 1977); and Juan Eduardo Zúñiga (Flores de plomo, 1999).
