= Luis Mariano de Larra =

Spanish playwright and novelist (1830–1901)

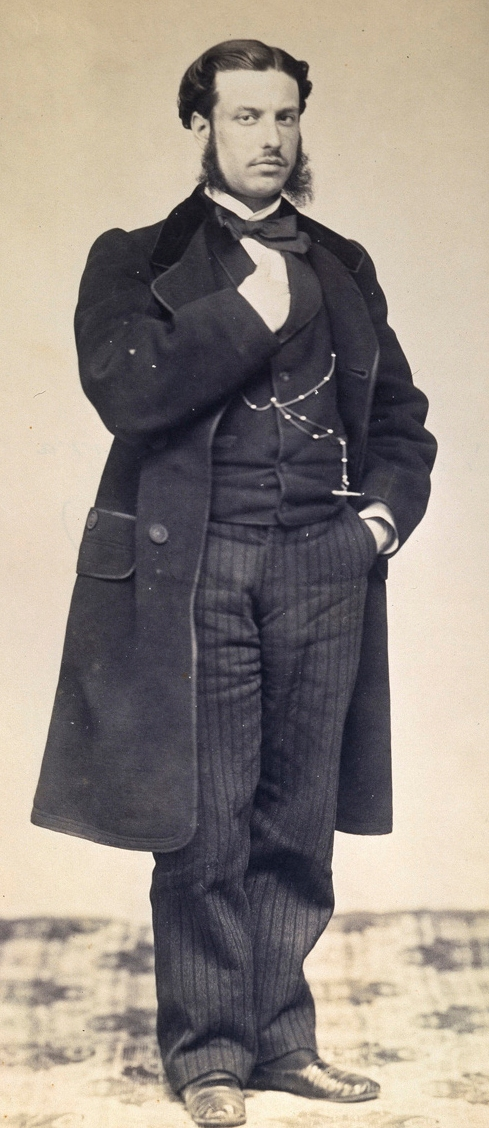
- Born: Luis Mariano de Larra y Wetoret; 17 December 1830; Madrid, Spain
- Died: 20 February 1901 (aged 70); Madrid, Spain
- Occupations: Journalist, novelist, playwright, politician
- Relatives: Mariano José de Larra (father), Baldomera Larra Wetoret (sister)

Luis Mariano de Larra y Wetoret (1830 – 1901) was a Spanish writer, son of journalist Mariano José de Larra. Noted as the librettist of numerous zarzuelas such as El Toro y el Tigre, Un embuste y una boda, Todo con raptos, El cuello de la camisa, con el Sr. Suricalday amongst others, his most famous work is undoubtedly El barberillo de Lavapiés (1874), set to music by Francisco Asenjo Barbieri.

Larra worked for the Ministry of Development and contributed to various publications of the time such as the Gaceta de Madrid, from which he resigned to devote himself exclusively to literature. He also wrote many comedies, among which is his much successful La oración de la tarde, drama in three acts and verse whose protagonist Don Diego de Mendoza, dragging his righteous indignation for reasons of honor, implements the evangelical precept of forgiving every injury. It premiered at Teatro del Circo on 25 November 1858 with great acclaim.

== Works ==
- En Palacio y en la calle
- Las tres noblezas
- Quien á cuchillo mata
- A caza de cuervos! con el Sr. Larrea
- Una nube de verano
- El amor y el interés
- La pluma y la espada
- La paloma y los halcones
- La planta exótica
- El Rey del mundo
- La oracion de la tarde
- La primera piedra
