= Baldomera Larra Wetoret =

Spanish criminal (1835–1915)

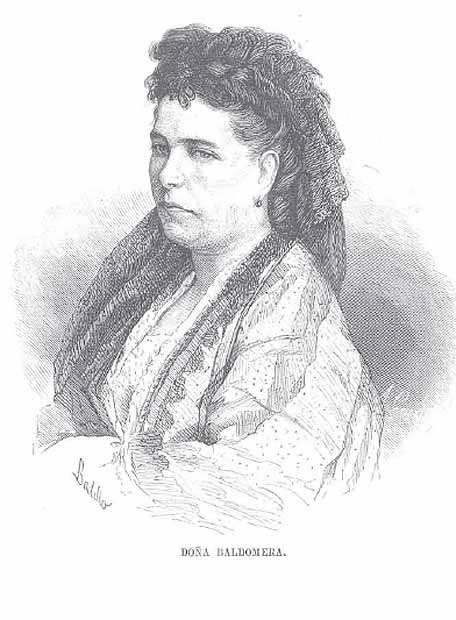
- Illustration from 1879
- Born: 1835; Madrid, Spain
- Died: 1915 (aged 79–80); Havana
- Occupation: Scam artist
- Years active: 1876-1881
- Relatives: Mariano José de Larra (father), Luis Mariano de Larra (brother)

Baldomera Larra Wetoret (1835–1915) was a Spanish criminal involved in an early Ponzi scheme. Despite being initially sentenced to six years in prison, she was ultimately acquitted, since the courts ruled that a married woman could not enter into financial contracts without her husband's permission.

== Early life ==
Wetoret was born in 1835 in Madrid to the writer Mariano José de Larra and his wife Josefa Wetoret. She was their third daughter. When she was 4 years old, her father committed suicide.

== Crime ==
Wetoret married Carlos de Montemayor, the personal doctor of Amadeus of Savoy. In 1873, her husband lost his job and abandoned her, fleeing to Cuba, leaving Wetoret alone in Spain in a precarious financial situation.

Wetoret started borrowing money from guarantors to provide for her children. In 1876, she opened an early ponzi scheme in Teatro Español. She would pay her customers using money given to her by other customers. Through this method, she amassed approximately 22 million reals and affected up to 50,000 people.

Wetoret earned the nickname La Patillas for her hairstyle and madre de los pobres (transl. the mother of the poor).

In December 1876, Wetoret realized she was not able to continue her business, and rumors began to circulate about her inability to pay back her customers. She fled to Switzerland and later lived in exile in France under a false identity of Madame Varela. Her family in Spain condemned her.

On July 15, 1878, she was extradited to Madrid after being arrested in Auteuil. She was sentenced to 6 years in prison for fraudulent concealment of assets. On February 1, 1881, she was acquitted through a loophole: as a married woman, she did not have the legal ability to enter financial contracts without her husband's consent.

== Later life and legacy ==
Upon her freedom, Wetoret moved to Cuba where she remained until her death. She lived with her brother, Luis Mariano de Larra, a playwright and novelist in his own right. Wetoret has been the subject of numerous songs and books.
