= Frasquita Larrea =

Spanish writer (1775–1838)

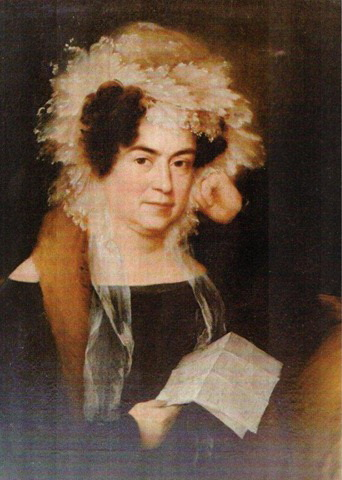
- Born: Francisca Javiera Ruiz de Larrea y Aherán; 24 December 1775; Cádiz, Spain
- Died: 24 August 1838 (aged 62); El puerto de Santa María (Cádiz), Spain
- Occupation: Writer
- Known for: Spanish writer, influenced the "del Cádiz de las Cortes" romantic gatherings
- Spouse: Juan Nicolás Böhl de Faber
- Children: Fernán Caballero (Cecilia, daughter)

Francisca Javiera Ruiz de Larrea y Aherán (24 December 1775 – 24 August 1838), better known as Frasquita Larrea, was a Spanish writer who largely influenced the famous romantic gatherings "del Cádiz de las Cortes".

== Biography ==
Francisca Javiera Josefa Gregoria Ruiz de Larrea y Aherán was born on 24 December 1775 in Cádiz, Spain. She was born to Antonio Ruiz de Larrea y Gonzáles de Lopidana, a prosperous Spanish merchant, and Francisca Xaviera Aheran y Malone, an Irish woman exiled in Spain. Her mother was educated in England and had lived briefly in France.

She read and studied William Shakespeare, Immanuel Kant and René Descartes. Another major influence in her works was her keeping a bedside reading of the proto-feminist works of Mary Wollstonecraft.

Around 1790, in Cádiz, she met the German Hispanist Johann Nikolaus Böhl de Faber, (1770–1836), who was settled in the area, and they agreed to marry by the Catholic rite. He was not a Catholic, which was a setback to her, yet they agreed to marry by her traditions. They married on the 1 February 1796 and had four children. Cecilia, the first of which was the future writer.

== Type of literature ==
Francisca Javiera Josefa Gregoria Ruiz de Larrea y Aherán mainly wrote short prose and left many unpublished writings and memoirs that have later been transcribed by Antonio Orozco in his book called "La gaditana Fransquita Larrea, the First Spanish Romantic".

She spent the majority of her summers in life in Cádiz, where she claimed to be most inspired. She wrote her "Bornos Diaries" in the summer house, which was owned by Thomas Osborne Mann, her son-in-law.

Her daughter—Cecilia Francisca Böhl de Faber y Ruiz de Larrea—used a pseudonym, the name Fernán Caballero.

== Bibliography ==
- Pitollet, Camille: La querelle caldéronienne de Johan Nikolas Böhl von Faber et José Joaquín de Mora [Texte imprimé] : reconstituée d'après les documents originaux. París : F. Alcan, 1909.
- Pitollet, Camille: Quelques reliques de Böhl von Faber [Texte imprimé] . Madrid : typ. de la Revista de archivos, 1913.
- Böhl de Faber, Juan Nicolás: Pasatiempo crítico en que se ventilan los méritos de Calderón y el talento de su detractor en La Crónica Científica y Literaria de Madrid. c. 1818.
- Böhl de Faber, Juan Nicolás: Vindicaciones de Calderón y del teatro antiguo español contra los afrancesados en literatura. Cádiz : Imp. Carreño, 1820.
- Orozco Acuaviva, A.: La gaditana Frasquita Larrea, primera romántica española. Jerez de la Frontera. 1977.
- Larrea, Francisca: Diario. Jerez: Gráficas el Exportador, 1985. Edición especial realizada por la Asociación de Amigos de Bornos.
