= Böhl (surname) =

Böhl is a surname. Notable people with the surname include:

- Juan Nicolás Böhl de Faber (born Böhl und Lütkens, 1770–1836), German bibliophile
- Frans de Liagre Böhl (born Böhl, 1882–1976), Dutch professor of Assyriology and Hebrew
