= Juan Arolas =

Spanish poet and writer

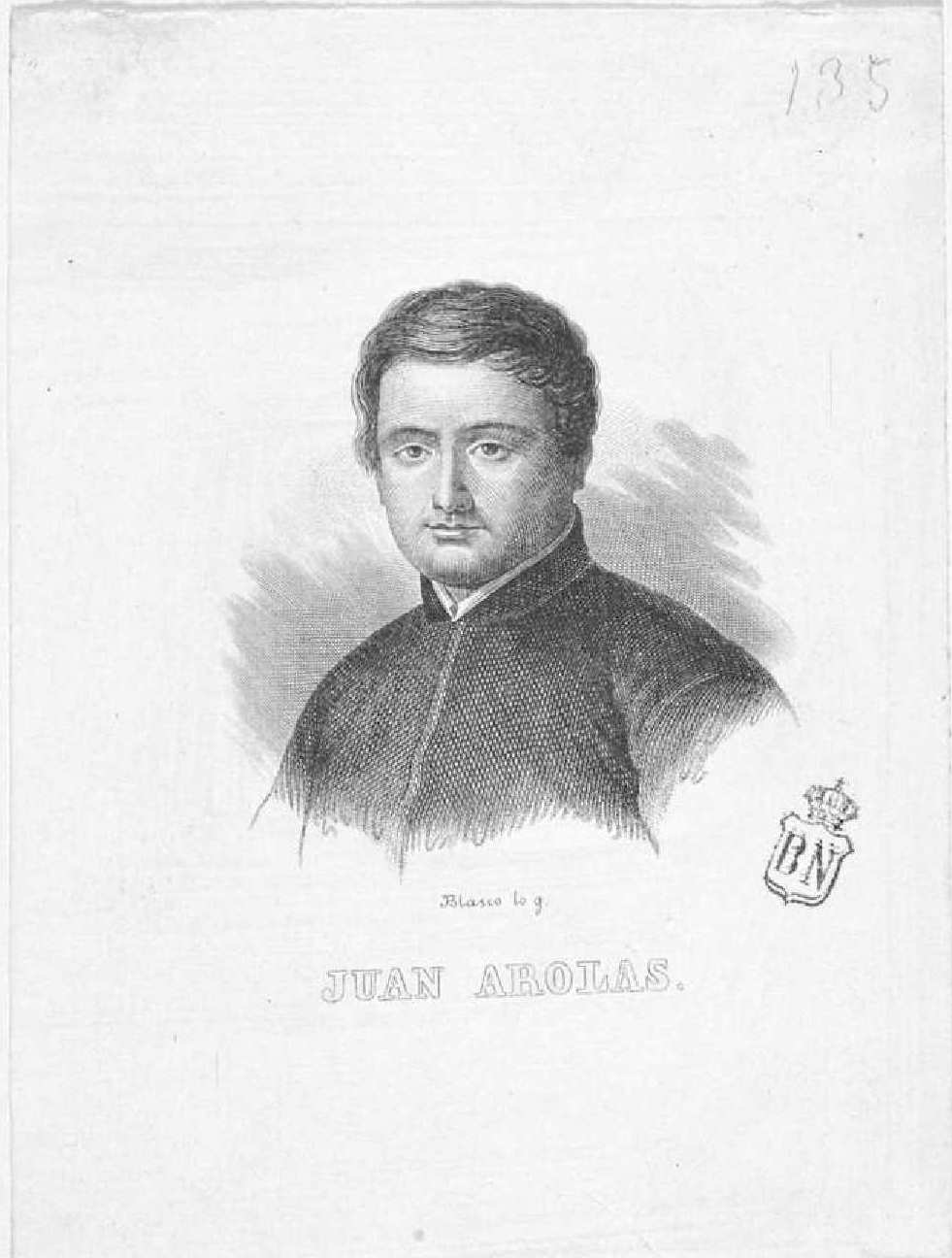
Juan Arolas, Spanish poet and writer

Juan Arolas (1805–1849) was a Spanish poet and writer.

== Biography ==
The son of well-off traders, he spent his childhood in Valencia where he studied with the Piarists. He joined this order in Peralta de la Sal in the year 1819, according to some forced by his family and according to others led by an earnest calling. It was there that he fell in love for the first time with a girl whose name is unknown. He studied philosophy in Zaragoza and theology in Valencia, and was appointed professor of the Colegio Andresiano in this city from 1825 to 1842. He also attended the literary gatherings of the editor Cabrerizo with other brethren of his order, such as Vicente Boix and Pascual Perez Rodriguez. Ardently liberal, Arolas and Perez founded a newspaper in 1833 called the Diario Mercantil in defense of freedom and Isabel II. He enthusiastically read the English and French romance writers, and wrote mostly sensuous oriental legends. Arolas led a disorderly life writing poetry with astonishing fecundity and sometimes resorting to plagiarism or paraphrasing to make money. He was very famous in the whole of Spain as a poet and did not leave the order as Boix perhaps out of fear of not finding a way to make a living. He suffered from mental illness from 1842. He was tormented by erotic delusions and had to be confined in a cell, where he died without regaining his sanity.

== Work ==
He was a poet of excessive facility, overly fruitful and without scruples when it came to plagiarizing or imitating. He was fond of formal ornamentation and had little sense of the internal structure of a poem. The poetry of Arolas has been relegated to a secondary place in Spanish Romanticism. His most important collections of verses are chivalrous and oriental poetry (Valencia, Cabrerizo, 1840), pastoral and amorous poems (Valencia, Mompié, 1843), religious, chivalrous, amatory, and oriental (Valencia, Mariana y Sanz, 1860).

The thematic classification of this last title describes its production if we add a number of very humorous poems that are both clever and festive. The amorous poetry is neoclassical y romantic. The neoclassical shows influences from the Latin elegiacs and the Spanish classics. The romantic is blatantly carnal and the masterpiece is "A una bella" whose refrain is "sé más feliz que yo" [Be happier than I am]. Arolas is one of the most erotic poets of Spanish literature and some of his style rubbed off on Julian del Casal, a poet who was overall far superior to him.

The Oriental is sometimes used as an excuse to display the author's repressed eroticism, which tormented him. The decorative clichés are monotonous and the landscape has a biblical imprint. Narratives such as "Leyenda tártara," "los amores de Semíramis," and "Granada" stand out.

The chivalrous poetry and the medieval themes are narrative and, with limited exceptions, focus on Spain. This poetry is inspired by various historical sources and reveals the influence of Rivas and José Zorrilla, but fails in its factual narration due to prolixity and monotony, and in the fundamentals of the characters.

His most interesting work is La sílfide del acueducto (Valencia, 1837). It is composed of 4,300 verses, and dedicated to a girl from Peralta named Leonor. The poem has an undoubtedly autobiographical basis and describes the love of Hormesinda and Ricardo, who are frustrated by his forced admission to a monastery by his father. She succeeds in arriving at his cell and enjoying his love, but is discovered by the abbot who has Hormesinda poisoned and Ricardo imprisoned where he dies in his cell. Their souls reach the Elysian Fields where they enjoy the love that they were denied on Earth. The poem expresses his liberal ideals and his protest against religious repression.

His religious poetry was inspired by Lamartine and the Bible, but there is no trace of intimacy in it: the power and greatness of the Creator, as well as the sin and ingratitude of man towards God, are recounted in poems that deal with biblical themes or episodes in the life of Christ.

== See also ==
- Romanticism in Spanish literature
- Romanticism: General view of the movement.
- Spanish literature: Evolution of Spanish literature.
