= José Gutiérrez de la Vega =

Spanish painter

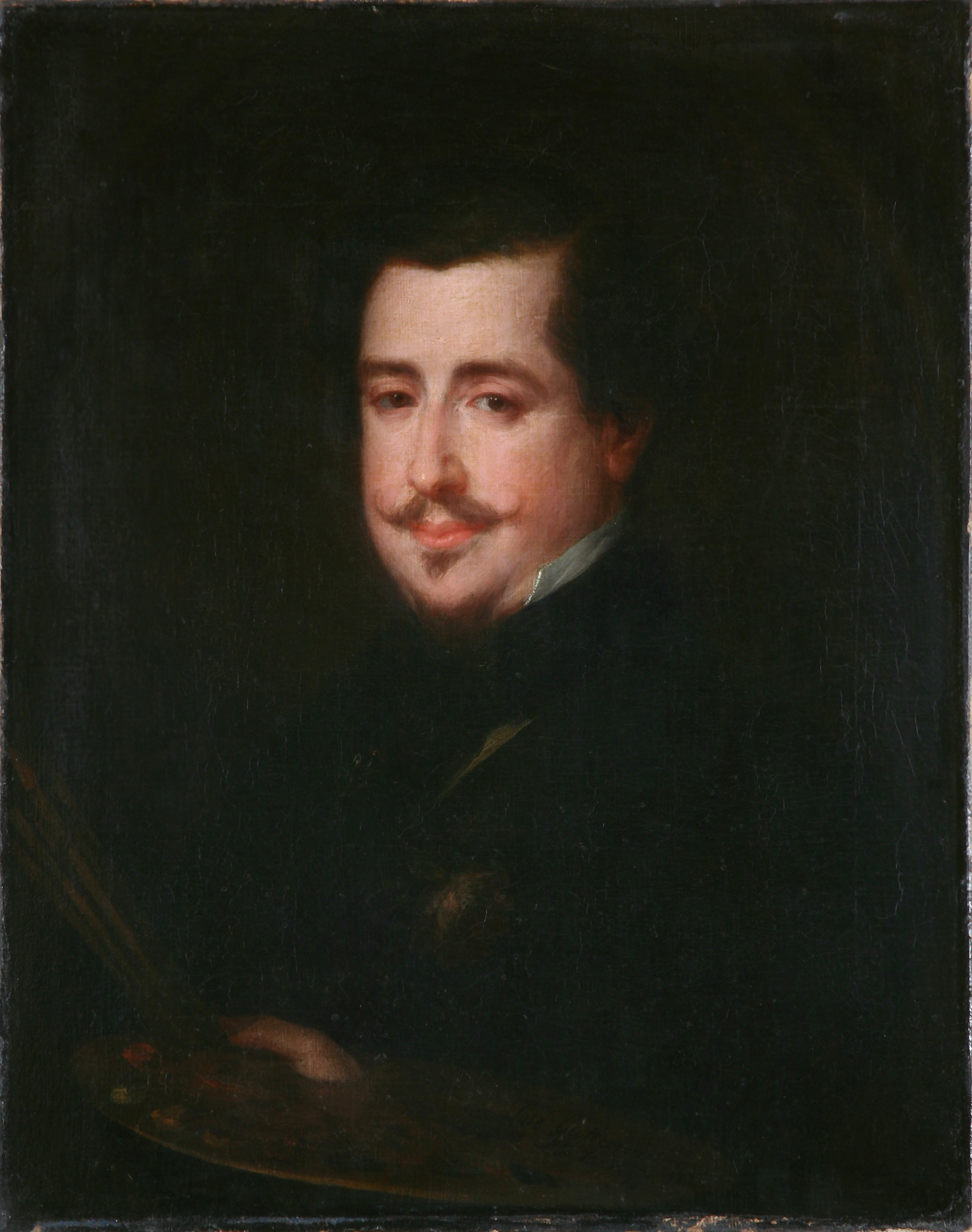
Self-portrait (1847)

José Gutiérrez de la Vega y Bocanegra (26 December 1791 – December 1865) was a Spanish painter who specialized in portraits and religious subjects.

== Biography ==
He was born in Seville. His father was an engraver and woodcarver. He began his artistic education in his father's workshops, then enrolled at the Real Academia de Bellas Artes de Santa Isabel de Hungría, where he studied until 1817. In 1825, he became an assistant professor there.

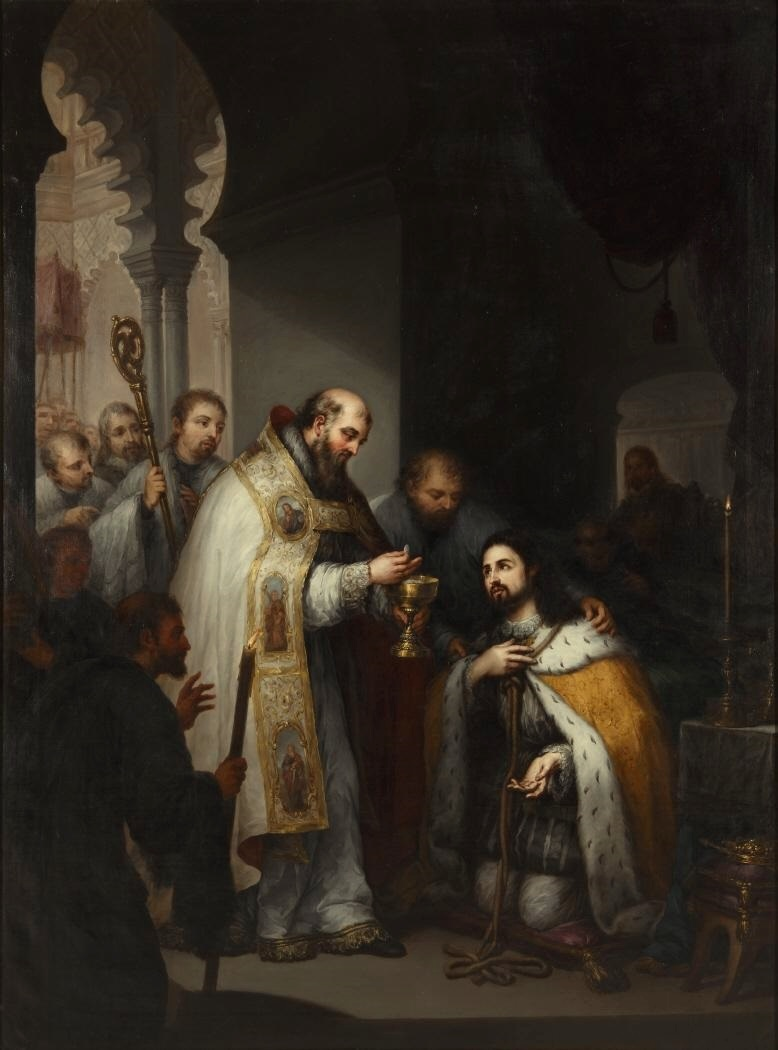
The Last Communion of San Fernando (1832).

In 1828, his friendship with the English travel writer, Richard Ford, led him to begin spending his summers in Cádiz with the British Consul, Sir John MacPherson Brackenbury (1778-1847), a friend of Ford's. In 1830, he painted a portrait of Brackenbury and his family which was presented at a contest and won first prize.

The following year, this encouraged him to take a trip to Madrid in the company of Antonio María Esquivel and his wife, where they both competed at a contest held by the Real Academia de Bellas Artes de San Fernando. Neither was immediately successful, but he and his family settled there permanently the following year, when he was named an "Academician of Merit" for his painting "The Last Communion of San Fernando".

He soon established himself as a popular painter among the upper classes of Madrid and was never short of commissions. He was a member of the Board of Directors at the "Liceo Artístico y Literario". In 1838, was named to a chair at the Academy in Seville, but he remained in Madrid. Two years later, he gained the favor of Queen Isabel II and became a sort of honorary court painter.

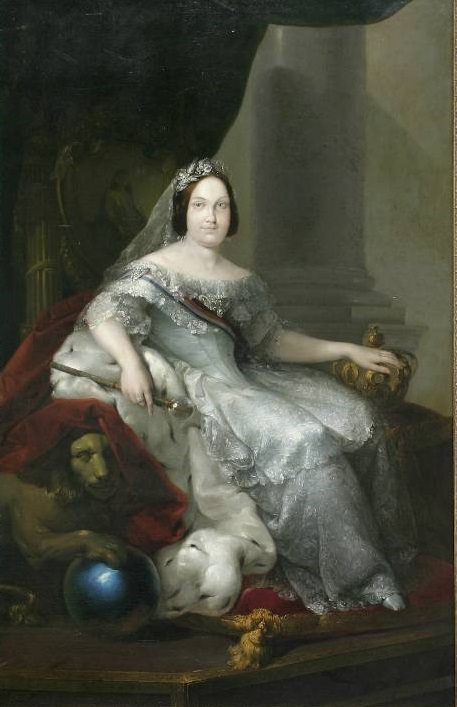
Portrait of Queen Isabel (1840)

The next few years became his most productive period when he also established himself as a painter of portrait miniatures. Some of his best-known large-scale portraits came from this time; including ones of Queen Isabel and Mariano José de Larra. Religious works were also a significant part of his output; notably portraits of Saints Justa and Rufina, a Virgin with Child and an allegory on the New Testament, all of which reflected his first influence, Bartolomé Esteban Murillo.

In 1845, despite maintaining a voluminous correspondence with the Director of the Seville Academy, and working on his behalf at the Royal Court, he was forced to resign his position there, due to complaints about his continued absence. At that time, he also began to fall out of favor with the Queen and had difficulties getting paid for his work. Several projects were left unfinished, and he gave up hope of achieving an official appointment as court painter. He produced less after that and appears to have stopped painting altogether by the late 1850s. He died in Madrid.
