= Augusto Ferrán =

Spanish poet (1835–1880)

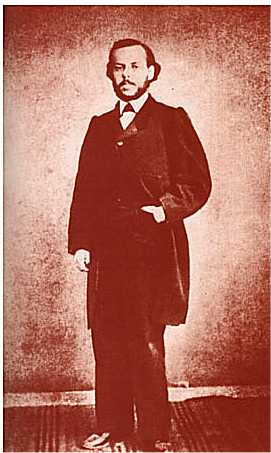
- Augusto Ferran y Fornies
- Born: July 7, 1835; Madrid
- Died: April 2, 1880 (aged 44); Madrid
- Education: Instituto del Noviciado
- Occupation: Poet
- Writing career
- Language: Spanish
- Notable work: La soledad
- Literary movement: Postromantic

Augusto Ferrán y Forniés (7 July 1835 in Madrid – 2 April 1880 in Madrid) was a Spanish poet of the Postromantic period.

== Biography ==
Ferrán was born in Madrid on 7 July 1835 to well-to-do parents of Catalan and Aragonese descent. The family business was in manufacturing gilded moldings. His father went off to Havana to seek his fortune and Augusto began studying at the Instituto del Noviciado. He travelled to Germany, passing through Paris, and there came in contact with the poetry of Heinrich Heine as well as Friedrich Schubert, Felix Mendelssohn and Robert Schumann. His mother died in 1859 and he returned to Madrid. Back at home, he founded a magazine, El Sábado, with the aim of disseminating German lyric poetry. The magazine did not last long, but his labors allowed him to meet and befriend Julio Nombela, a pamphleteer. Together they founded another short-lived magazine, Las Artes y las Letras. In 1860 he travelled to Paris with Nombela, but his economic difficulties and prodigal tendencies landed him in the hands of usurers. He was forced to return to Madrid, and there Nombela introduced him to an acquaintance: Gustavo Adolfo Bécquer. In late 1861 El Museo Universal published his Traducciones e imitaciones del poeta alemán Enrique Heine (Translations and Imitations of the German Poet Heinrich Heine), and several of his other works appeared in Almanaque in 1863. He obtained an editorial post at El Semanario Popular, and this finally positioned him to spread Heine's work to Spain.

By 1861 his book La soledad had appeared in print. The first part of the book reproduced several popular songs of traditional lyricism, and the second part featured original work that imitate their style and inspiration. Recurring themes are a search for solitude in which to flee from a hostile world, the struggle between rich and poor, the passage of time, existentialism, and love. The book received enthusiastic support from Gustavo Adolfo Bécquer, and his words were added as a prologue in subsequent editions. He helped create a popular genre of song-based poetry that owed much to Heine; around the same time as Antonio de Trueba's Libro de los cantares (1852), fellow Heine translator Eulogio Florentino Sanz and friend Gustavo Adolfo Bécquer were producing very similar work. Other examples of authors moved by the same Volkgeist include Terencio Thos y Codina (Semanario Popular, 1862–1863), Rosalía de Castro (Cantares gallegos, 1863), Ventura Ruiz Aguilera (Armonías y cantares, 1865), Aristides Pongilioni (Ráfagas poéticas, 1865), Melchor de Palau (Cantares, 1866), and José Puig y Pérez (Coplas y quejas, 1869). This genre would ultimately lead to the Neopopularist school of the Generation of 27.

Ferrán spent part of 1863 in the Veruela monastery, after having visited there on several previous occasions. At some point he also resided in Alcoy, where he directed the Diario de Alcoy (1865-1866), but he eventually returned to the capital city. He may have returned to collaborate on La Ilustración de Madrid that Bécquer would direct in 1868 during the revolution. When Bécquer died, Ferrán worked on the posthumous edition of his Obras (1871) alongside Rodríguez Correa and Narciso Campillo. In that same year he produced his second book of verse, La pereza, that revisited his previous work and included various newspaper-style articles. The book's content had a popular meter much like the first, but it possessed much more variety in that it featured soleás, seguidillas, and seguidillas gitanas in addition to the previous forms. The themes of the book were basically similar, but folklore ran much more strongly in the second. Juan Ramón Jiménez often recited his favorite poem from this book, reproduced below:

Eso que estás esperando
día y noche, y nunca viene;
eso que siempre te falta
mientras vives, es la muerte.

In 1872 or 1873 he emigrated to Chile where he supposedly married (according to Nombela). Soon after his return in 1878, he was admitted to the Manicomio de Carabanchel in Madrid where he died on 2 April 1880.

== Legacy ==
Ferrán's poetry assumes a break with the traditional tone that is reminiscent of Quintana. His verse is closely related to spoken language, and his sparse words are directed toward a variety of intimate and openly sentimental content that is bettered by being brief and confident. The same tradition was followed by many other important poets like Bécquer, Antonio Machado, and Juan Ramón Jiménez.

In prose, Ferrán published German translations and several legends. His translations of Heine appeared in El Museo Universal (1861), in El Eco del País (1865), and in La Ilustración Española y Americana (1873). His translations often employed the same combinations of seven-syllable and eleven-syllable verses common to Bécquer's work. He also translated heine's famous preface to Don Quijote. Concerning the legends, "Una inspiración alemana" (A German Inspiration) describes the successive unrequited love affairs of a poet who withdraws into his own memory and commits suicide. "El puñal" recounts the mythical foundation of the Veruela monastery, and in "La fuente de Montal" a fountain miraculously helps solve a crime.

== Works ==
=== Poetry ===
- La soledad (1861)
- La pereza (1871)

=== Prose ===
- "Una inspiración alemana", in Revista de España, (March 1872).
- "El puñal", a legend published in El Museo Universal (1863).
- "La fuente de Montal" (1866)
- E l sapo concho(1868)

== See also ==
- Spanish Romance literature
