= Jugar con fuego =

Zarzuela by Francisco Asenjo Barbieri

- Zarzuela by Francisco Asenjo Barbieri
- Librettist: Ventura de la Vega
- Language: Spanish
- Based on: Madame d'Egmont, ou Sont-elles deux? by Jacques-François Ancelot and Alexis Decomberousse
- Premiere: 6 October 1851; Teatro del Circo, Madrid

Jugar con fuego (Playing with Fire) is a zarzuela in three acts by Francisco Asenjo Barbieri, to a Spanish libretto by Ventura de la Vega. The first performance took place at the Teatro del Circo in Madrid on 6 October 1851, and it rapidly became a cornerstone of the romantic zarzuela repertoire. The title refers to how dangerous it is to play with love.

== Background ==
The work is a landmark in the history of Spanish opera, being an early and notable example of a three-act zarzuela, after the model of French opéra comique, although Barbieri's music is heavily influenced by contemporary Italian opera composers, notably Verdi. As with most zarzuelas of this period, de la Vega's plot and characters are squarely based on an adaptation of a French play, in this case Madame d'Egmont, ou Sont-elles deux? (Paris, Théâtre des Variétés, 25 April 1833) by Jacques-François Ancelot and Alexis Decomberousse.

The (heavily cut) 1954 Alhambra LP recording of Jugar con fuego, conducted by Ataúlfo Argenta, with Pilar Lorengar, Manuel Ausensi, Carlos Munguia and Antonio Campo, was reissued on CD in 1990, and again by Novoson in 2014.

The Act 3 solo "Un tiempo fue" (sung by the Duchess, repentant and in finally truly in love) is the most popular number of the score, and is often anthologised in collections of zarzuela romanzas.

== Roles ==
Role	Voice type	Premiere Cast, 6 October 1851 (Conductor: )
La Duquesa de Medina	soprano	Adelaida Latorre
La Condesa de Bornos, a friend of the duquesa	speaking role	
El Duque de Alburquerque	bass	Francisco Calvet
El Marqués de Caravaca	baritone	Francisco Salas
Félix	tenor	José González
Antonio, his cousin	tenor	Vicente Caltañazor
A doctor	bass	
An asylum keeper	tenor	
Chorus: Ladies; men and women of the people; inhabitants of the asylum.

== Synopsis ==
During the reign of Philip V of Spain

=== Act I ===
Among the throng of the verbenera at mid-summer night of San Juan on the banks of the Manzanares the nobility mingle with pedlars and artisans. The crowd recognises the Duchess of Medina, a young widow who has disguised herself as a poor house-maid for an assignation with her admirer, but pursued by the Marqués of Caravaca, a boastful and lecherous man. He is secretly trying to discover who is following her and importunes her putting paid to her adventure, until her father also appears, which allows her to disappear into the crowd again. Félix and Antonio, poverty-stricken hidalgos enter, the former hoping for a meeting with a lady who calls herself Leonor; eventually she emerges from the throng and they exchange conversation in a duo. While Félix goes to find a carriage for his young lady the Marqués interferes with several of his friends, to which the Duke responds, defending her honour. While Félix, having helped 'Leonor' flee, is bemused by the events, the crowd mock the aristocrats.

=== Act II ===
In a hall of the Palacio del Buen Retiro the Duchess of Medina tell her friend of her escape from the verbena. The Marqués enters and threatens the Duchess with his suspicions about whom she was talking to at the festival. Félix and his cousin arrive at the royal palace. At first refused entry because of their rustic appearance, the Marqués enquiries about Félix's love affairs. The young man is amazed to see and recognize the Duchess; the Marqués presents and observes their awkward behaviour. Félix is made to believe that he has been deceived by the Duchess and shows the Marqués one of her letters. The Duchess is now forced into accepting to wed the Marqués, all the while vowing to outwit her adversary. When he draws his sword and confronts her, Félix is condemned as being crazy and the Duke send him off to a madhouse.

=== Act III ===
In the courtyard of the madhouse, Félix awaits a visit from Antonio who tells him that he may be released if he signs an admission of his mistakes. The two men go inside as the Countess and Duchess enter, planning to free her lover; the latter sings of her repentance. When Félix emerges she admits everything to him. The Marqués arrives and is directed to a veiled woman inside but is attacked by inmates and has his clothes taken off him. Félix, Antonio and the Duchess make their escape but are blocked by the Duke who threatens them both, only to relent when the Countess brings a royal order authorizing the marriage of Félix and the Duchess. Marqués enters asking for help but is ignored, and all ends happily.

== Musical numbers ==
=== Act I ===
- Overture – opening chorus La noche ha llegado del señor San Juan.
- Si te place este bosque concertante. (Duquesa, Marqués, Duque, chorus)
- Trío La vi por vez primera. (Félix, Duque, Marqués)
- Dúo Hay un palacio junto al Prado... Yo prefiero tu salero. (Duquesa, Félix)

=== Act II ===
- Por temor a otra imprudencia. (Duquesa, Marqués)
- Yo, inocente. (Félix)
- Dúo, concertante.

=== Act III ===
- Chorus of inmates.
- Un tiempo fue que en dulce calma... Cuán presto, ay mísera. (Romanza - la Duquesa)
- Scene of the Marqués and madmen ¿Quién me socorre?. (Marqués y coro) based on the castellano "Habas verdes".
