= Fernán Caballero =

German / Spanish novelist

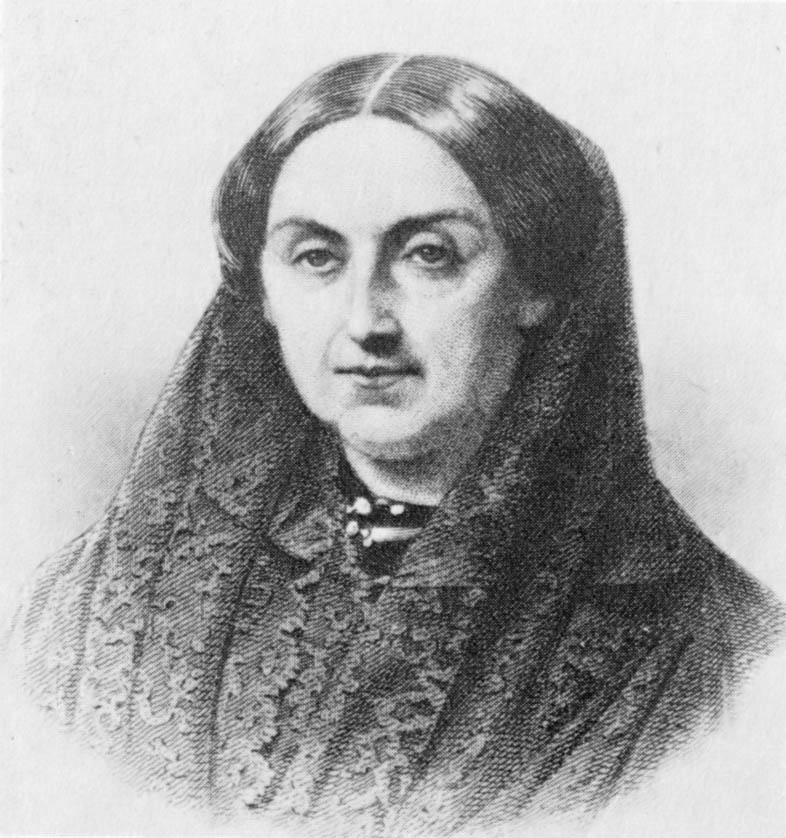
- Born: Cecilia Francisca Josefa Böhl und Lütkens y Ruiz de Larrea. 24 December 1796; Morges, Vaud
- Died: 7 April 1877 (aged 80); Seville, Spain
- Spouse(s): Antonio Planells y Bardají (1816-1816), Francisco de Paula Ruiz del Arco (1822-1835), Antonio Arrom y Morales de Ayala (1837-1859)
- Relatives: Juan Nicolás Böhl de Faber (father), Frasquita Larrea (mother)
- Writing career
- Language: Spanish
- Genre: Novel
- Notable work: La Mitología contada a los niños e historia de los grandes hombres de la Grecia

Fernán Caballero (24 December 1796 – 7 April 1877) was the pseudonym of Spanish novelist Cecilia Francisca Josefa Böhl de Faber y Ruiz de Larrea. She was the daughter of German writer Johann Nikolaus Böhl von Faber and Spanish writer Frasquita Larrea. Her pen name was taken from the name of a village in the province of Ciudad Real.

== Biography ==
Caballero was born in Morges, Switzerland as Cecilia Francisca Josefa Böhl und Lütkens y Ruiz de Larrea.

She was the daughter of Johann Nikolaus Böhl von Faber, a German merchant from Hamburg, and Frasquita Larrea, a Spanish writer from Cádiz.

She was educated principally in Hamburg but visited Spain in 1815.

In 1816, she married Antonio Planells y Bardaxi, an infantry captain who was killed the same year.

In 1822 Caballero married Francisco Ruiz del Arco, Marqués de Arco Hermoso, an officer in one of the Spanish household regiments.

Upon the death of Arco in 1835, Caballero, now a marquesa, married Antonio Arrom y Morales de Ayala in 1837.

Arrom was appointed consul in Australia, engaged in business enterprises and made money; committed suicide in 1859.

== Writings ==
Caballero gained notoriety after the publishing of La Gaviota. She published an anonymous romance, Sole in 1840 written in German and the original draft of La Gaviota had been written in French.

This novel, translated into Spanish by José Joaquín de Mora, appeared as the feuilleton of El Heraldo (1849), and was received well. The book was translated into most European languages, Another notable work by the author is La Familia de Alvareda (which was written, first of all, in German).

The Catholic Encyclopedia describes Caballero's later works as overly didactic, at the cost of "much of her primitive simplicity and charm". Caballero herself claimed that, though she occasionally idealized circumstances, she was conscientious in choosing for her themes subjects which had occurred in her own experience. For many years she was the most popular of Spanish writers, and the sensation caused by her death at Seville on 7 April 1877 proved that her truthfulness still attracted readers who were interested in records of national customs and manners.

Her Obras completas are included in the Colección de escritores castellanos: a useful biography by Fernando de Gabriel Ruiz de Apodaca precedes the Últimas producciones de Fernán Caballero (Seville, 1878).

== Sources ==
- Palma, Angélica, 'Fernán Caballero: la novelista novelable', Madrid, Espasa-Calpe, 1931
- Jarilla Bravo, Salud Maria. "Los refranes recopilados por Fernán Caballero (II)". Paremia, vol. 30, 2020, pp. 199–204. Paremia PDF
