= Antonio Alcalá Galiano =

Spanish politician and writer (1789–1865)

The Most Excellent Antonio Alcalá Galiano
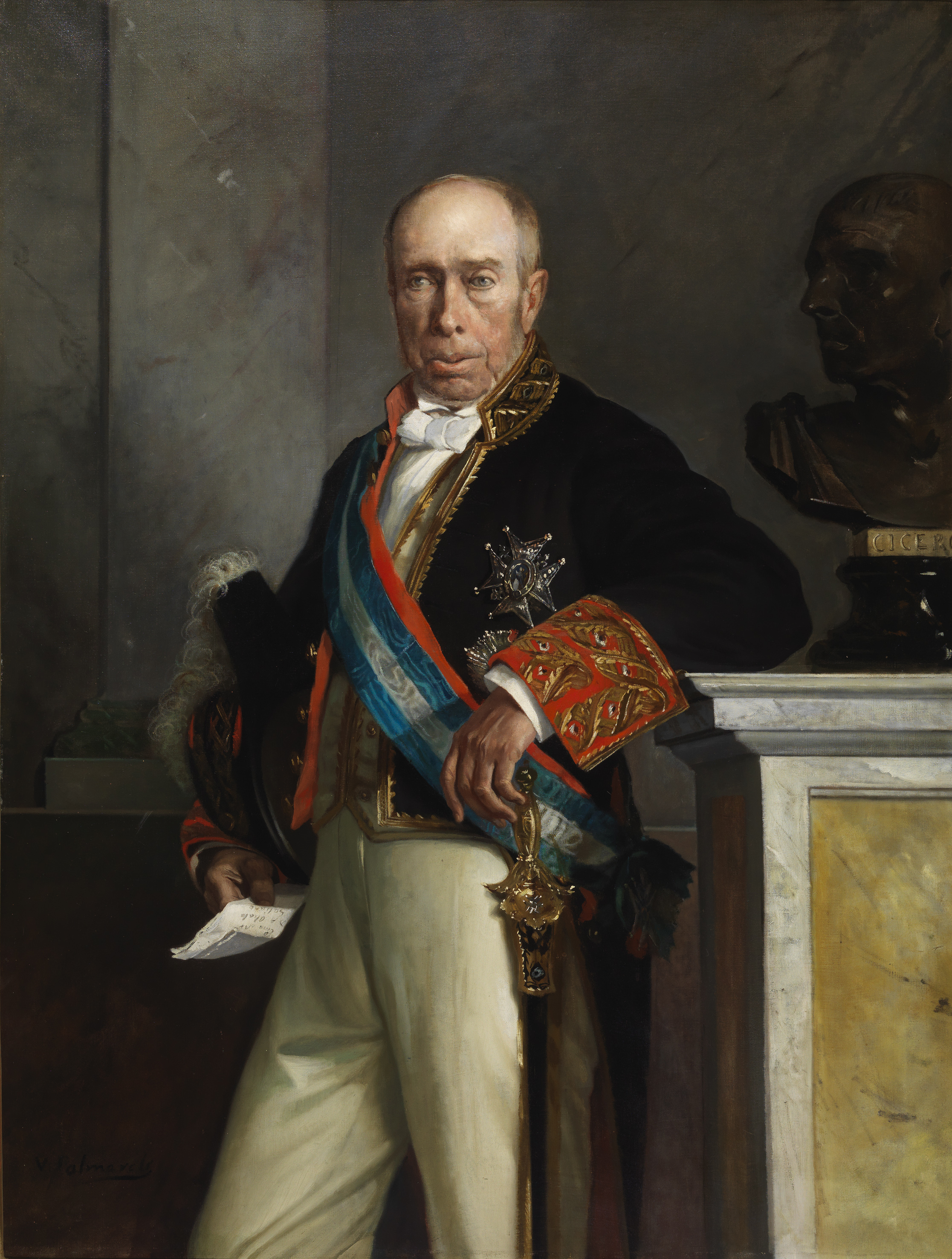
- Portrait by Vicente Palmaroli

Seat f of the Real Academia Española
- In office 25 February 1847 – 11 April 1865
- Preceded by: Seat established
- Succeeded by: Adelardo López de Ayala y Herrera

Personal details
- Born: Antonio Alcalá Galiano y Fernández de Villavicencio; 22 July 1789 Cádiz, Spain
- Died: 11 April 1865 (aged 75) Madrid, Spain

Antonio Alcalá Galiano y Fernández de Villavicencio (22 July 1789, Cádiz – 11 April 1865, Madrid) was a Spanish politician and writer who served as Minister of the Navy (1836) and Minister of Public Works (1865). He was elected a Deputy for Cádiz in 1822 and served sporadically through ten successive legislatures, until his death.

== Biography ==
He was born to an influential military family. His father, the explorer Dionisio Alcalá Galiano, was killed at the Battle of Trafalgar and his uncle, Don Juan María de Villavicencio, was Captain general of the Armada and a Regent of the Kingdom during the interregnum in the reign of Ferdinand VII.

After his secondary studies at the "Real Colegio de la Purísima Concepción de Cabra" (now known as "IES Aguilar y Eslava"), he travelled through the Mediterranean with his father and spent some time in Naples. In 1806, he enrolled as a cadet in the "Guardias Marinas Españolas" and the following year was named Master at the port of Seville. He was married in 1808, but separated from his wife seven years later; because, it is believed, of her infidelity due to his ugliness. After that, he briefly gained a reputation as a libertine and drunkard.

He abandoned his military career in 1812 and became a "Doceañista" (a supporter of the Spanish Constitution of 1812). Two years later, together with José Joaquín de Mora, he came out against the German reactionary Romanticism advocated by Juan Nicolás Böhl de Faber but, after his stay in London, came to support the new aesthetic and wrote a prologue to El moro expósito (The Moor Exposed), by his friend Ángel de Saavedra; the manifesto of Spanish Romanticism.

He participated in the conspiracy that ended with the triumph of Rafael del Riego in 1820 and was considered to be a great orator; defending Liberalism during the Trienio Liberal. When Ferdinand VII was restored to power after the French invasion, he was forced into self-exile in London.

While there, he survived by teaching Spanish language and literature classes then, from 1828 to 1830, held the Chair of Spanish at the newly created University College. Until then, he had been a great admirer of Montesquieu, but soon absorbed English ways of thinking, befriended Jeremy Bentham, became attracted to the moderate liberalism of Edmund Burke and rejected abstract principles in favor of utilitarianism, then adopted the doctrinaire liberalism of Alexis de Tocqueville and Benjamin Constant. He returned to Spain in 1833, after Isabella II became Queen, and joined the Liberal cabinet of Juan Álvarez Mendizábal.

From that time, he held several ministerial positions and ambassadorships. In 1835, he was one of the co-founders of the Ateneo de Madrid. In 1863, he became a member of the Real Academia de la Historia, followed by a membership at the Real Academia de Ciencias Morales y Políticas.

He wrote a detailed autobiography, published posthumously in two versions: Recuerdos de un anciano (1878) and Memorias (1886). He was also a literary critic. His most notable work in that genre being Lecciones de literatura española, francesa, inglesa e italiana del siglo XVIII. He also composed some Lecciones de derecho político y constitucional (1843). The author, Juan Valera, was his nephew.

== Selected writings ==
- Recuerdos de un anciano, 1878, reprinted by Grupo Planeta, 2009 ISBN 978-84-989200-1-7
