= Francisco Asenjo Barbieri =

Spanish composer (1823–1894)

The Most Excellent Francisco Asenjo Barbieri
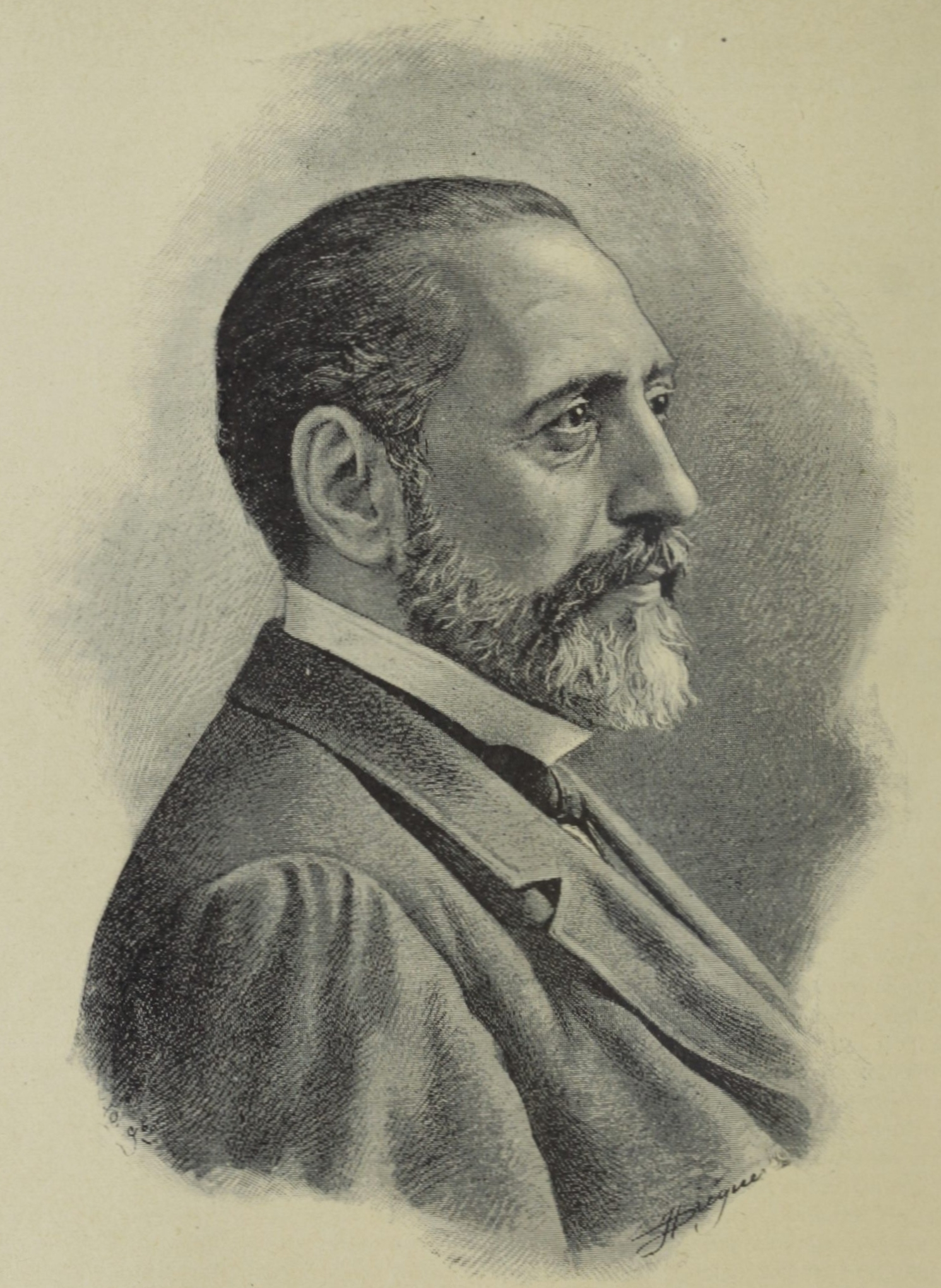
- Born: 3 August 1823; Madrid, Spain
- Died: 19 February 1894 (aged 70); Madrid, Spain

Seat H of the Real Academia Española
- In office 13 March 1892 – 17 February 1894
- Preceded by: Pedro Antonio de Alarcón
- Succeeded by: Segismundo Moret

Francisco Asenjo Barbieri (August 3, 1823 - February 19, 1894) was a Spanish clarinetist, composer, and musicologist. Barbieri was a leading composer of zarzuelas. He has been referred to as the “most important of all nineteenth-century composers" of the genre. His best-known zarzuelas include El barberillo de Lavapiés, Jugar con fuego, and Pan y toros.

== Early life ==
Asenjo Barbieri was born on August 3, 1823 in Madrid as Francisco Asenjo to his father José Asenjo, a cabinet runner, and his mother Petra Barbieri. His father died in the Spanish Civil War when he was young, so he was primarily raised by his mother and his maternal grandfather. He would later take on his mother's last name of Barbieri.

As a child, Barbieri would frequent the Teatro de la Cruz, the theater his grandfather managed. It was here that he was exposed to much of the music that would influence him in his later career. During this time, Barbieri was taught solfège by José Ordóñez Mayorito, a professor at his grandfather's theater.

Originally as a young teenager Barbieri considered being a physician, but avoided the career due to an aversion to examining cadavers. At the behest of his stepfather, he would later attend the Escuela de Arquitectura to pursue engineering in 1837, but this career was never explored.

== Career ==
Barbieri enrolled in the Madrid Royal Conservatory in 1837, the same year that he attended the Escuela de Arquitectura. At the conservatory he studied piano, voice, clarinet, and composition.

In his adult life, Barbieri held a variety of jobs to support his musical career, including work as a piano teacher, a music copyist, professional clarinetist, traveling singer, translator, prompter, and café-pianist. In 1842, Barbieri began composing works for orchestra while a member of the Teatro del Circo chorus, including an unfinished zarzuela titled Felipa.

Starting in 1851, he worked at the Teatro del Circo as the choral director. During his time with the theater he wrote many of his stage works, including his best known zarzuelas. Later, in 1868, he became the professor of harmony and musical history at the Madrid Conservatory Eventually Barbieri established his own orchestra, the Society for Orchestral Music, and began publishing many of his own written works.

In addition to his work as a composer, Barbieri was an accomplished writer, musicologist, and music critic. He was the founder of La España Musical, a society and periodical that was dedicated to establishing a Spanish opera tradition and promoting the development of Spanish lyric theater works. As a musicologist, Barbieri published the Cancionero de Palacio, a collection of 550 Spanish court songs from the Renaissance era, primarily from the late fifteenth century. This collection of works helped inspire a growing Spanish nationalist movement in the arts.

== Music ==
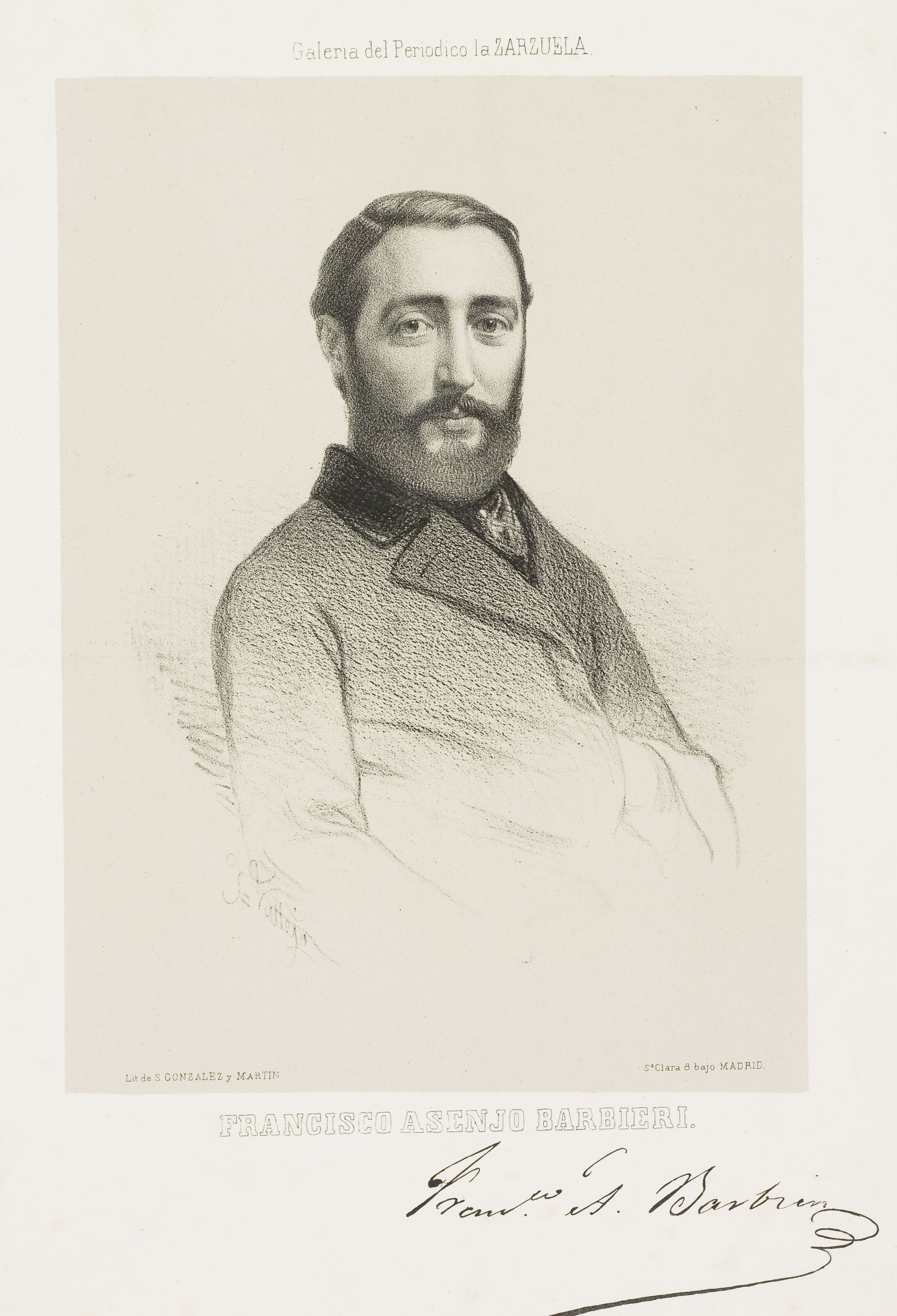
Barbieri in his earlier life

During his life, Barbieri wrote 77 zarzuelas among many other major works. This includes his opera buffa Il Buontempone, a work that was heavily influenced by works of the great Italian opera buffa composers and of Offenbach, though it went unperformed. Barbieri also composed art songs alongside solo piano and double piano pieces. He also wrote a few orchestral works and some religious pieces.

Barbieri's style was heavily influenced by Italian and German works. Barbieri would frequently memorize the Italian operas that he would watch at the Teatro de la Cruz and he was an advocate for the German symphony in Spain who helped establish the genre in the country.

While Barbieri was influenced by other national styles of music, his works have been noted as distinctly Spanish. Barbieri would incorporate Spanish folk elements into his works through the use of seguidillas, fandangos, and more Spanish dance forms. He was also known for his use of Spanish characters and themes, including the use of Francisco Goya as a character in his zarzuela Pan y toros.

As a composer of zarzuelas, Barbieri pioneered the zarzuela grande genre with his work Jugar con fuego (1851), the first Zarzuela told in three acts as opposed to the standard two and his first popular work. Barbieri's Pan y toros (1864) has been referred to as another one of his most important works, signifying his shift towards more traditional Spanish styles of music and performance. Barbieri's most well-known work came in 1874 with El barberillo de Lavapiés. El barberilo de Lavapiés is one of the most frequently performed zarzuelas with many of the songs from the work becoming part of the Spanish vocal repertoire.

== Death and legacy ==
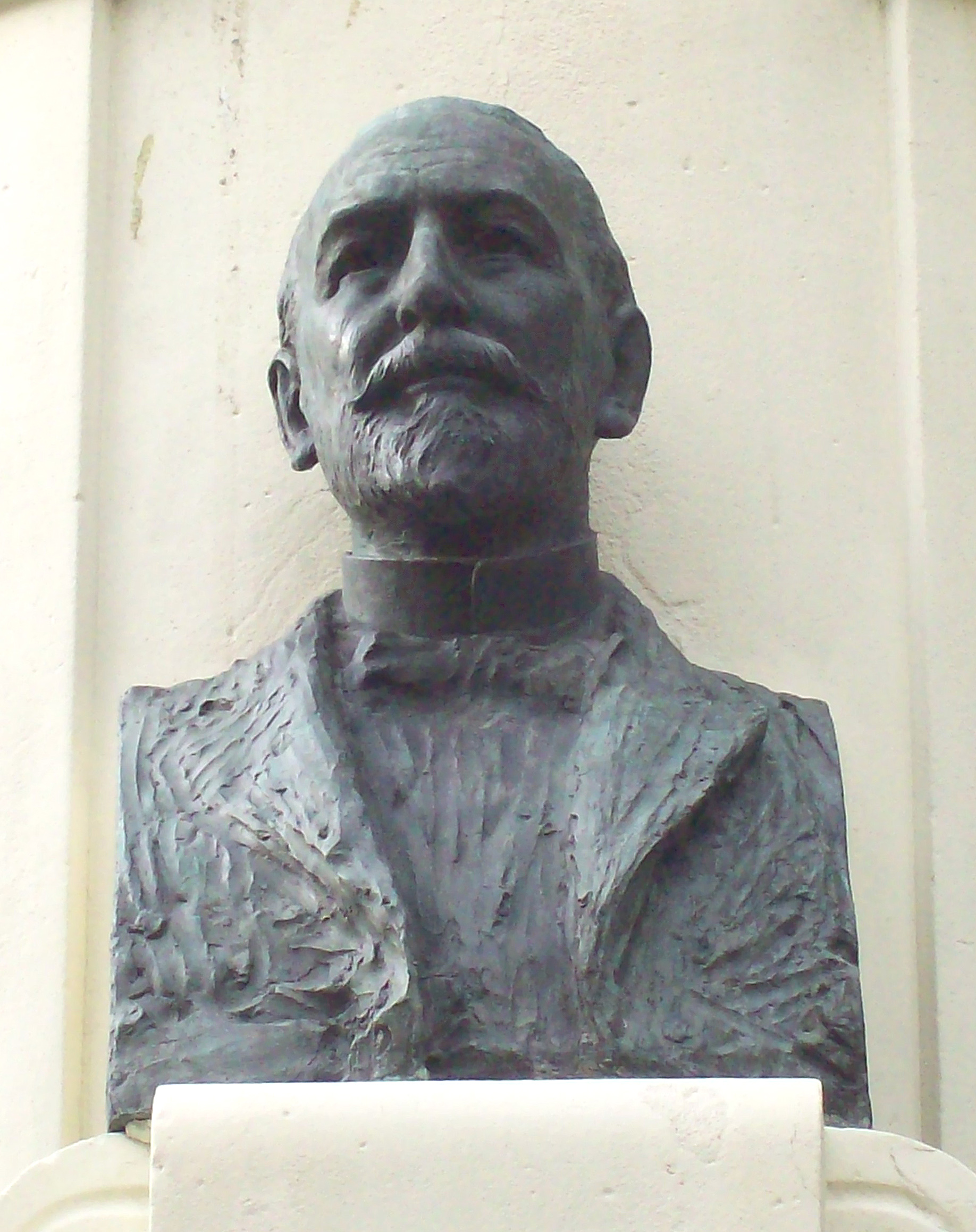
Bronze bust of Barbieri, sculpted by Lorenzo Coullaut Valera

Barbieri died on February 19, 1894, in Madrid, the same place of which he was born. Upon his death a large funeral service was hosted, whose procession moved past the Teatro de la Zarzuela. His body was buried in the Saint Isidore Cemetery in Madrid. His wife Joaquina Peñalver y de la Sierra died just 8 days later.

He has since been recognized as one of the most important Spanish composers of the 19th century, with his influence on the Spanish national music tradition being compared to that of Mikhail Glinka in Russia.
