= Barrapunto =

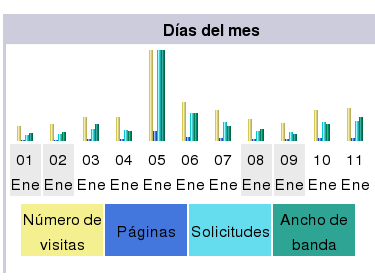
Web traffic graph illustrating the "Efecto Barrapunto", analogous to the Slashdot effect.

Barrapunto was a Spanish-language Slashdot-like website, founded on 7 June 1999, which is part of a complex social network among Spanish-language websites. In 2006, it was the winner of a 20Blogs Award from the online newspaper 20 minutos, in the category "Mejor comunidad de un blog" (best blog community). The site and its community have also been the subject of both English- and Spanish-language academic research.

The name was derived in the same manner as Slashdot, with the Spanish "http://" pronounced "hache-te-te-pe-dos puntos-barra-barra" and "http://barrapunto.com/" pronounced "hache-te-te-pe-dos puntos-barra-barra-barra-punto-punto-com". Barrapunto ran Slash, the open source software used by Slashdot, and materials were published under CC BY.

Barrapunto was founded by six professionals and teachers in 1999 as a meeting point for the free software community. By 2005 more than half a million comments had been posted and almost 40,000 stories.

After six years of silence, in January 2018, the website's Twitter account published one tweet to announce a technical stop and it has been down ever since. In August 2019, and in the absence of an official statement on the matter, the website stopped responding.
