= Juan Nicolás Böhl de Faber =

German hispanist

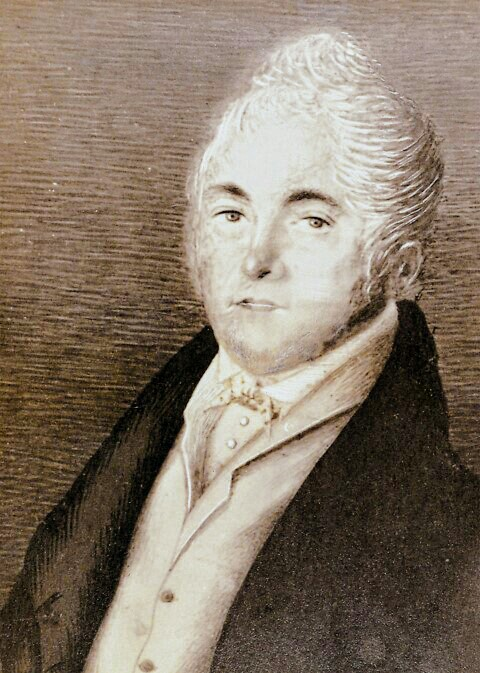
- Born: Johann Nikolaus Böhl und Lütkens; 9 December 1770; Hamburg, Germany
- Died: 11 September 1836 (aged 65); Cádiz, Spain
- Occupation(s): Bibliophile and hispanist
- Movement: Romanticism
- Spouse: Frasquita Larrea
- Children: Fernán Caballero (daughter)

Juan Nicolás Böhl de Faber (in German sources also: Johann Nikolaus Böhl von Faber, né Böhl und Lütkens; Hamburg, 1770 - Cádiz, 1836) was a German bibliophile and lover of Spanish literature and culture. He was the father of Spanish/Swiss novelist Cecilia Böhl de Faber, aka "Fernán Caballero".

== Biography ==
Böhl started his life in Spain at a shop owned by his bourgeois parents. In addition to the work of the store, he was also Hanseatic consul for his hometown Hamburg as well as overseeing the warehouses held by Sir James Duff and his nephew William Gordon at Puerto de Santa María. It was in Cádiz that he met Frasquita Larrea (Francisca Javiera Ruiz de Larrea y Aherán, 1775–1838) a Catholic lady of high society who had travelled through France and Germany and mastered their languages easily, read Shakespeare, was well-versed in the thoughts of Kant and Descartes, read Madame Staël, and delighted in the work of the feminist Mary Wollstonecraft. The two were married in 1790 and lived for a short time on Lake Geneva, in the Canton of Vaud, where their daughter was born, the future novelist known as Fernán Caballero. Later, the couple would have two more children. Returning to Spain, they spent time living in Cádiz where they enriched the local cultural scene by introducing the first tertulias. In 1805, the pair journeyed to Germany for a second time where their union began to show the first signs of stress. Frasquita returned to Spain alone, where she would experience the Peninsular War with her two daughters while living in Chiclana de la Frontera. The family reunited after the end of the war in Cádiz.

Böhl de Faber's hispanophilia prompted him to collect many works of Spanish literature and build an important library. While travelling in Germany he obtained many of the Aesthetic works of the brothers August Wilhelm Schlegel and Friedrich Schlegel concerning art, literature, and above all Pedro Calderón de la Barca. In 1814, he published an article entitled "Reflexiones de Schlegel sobre el teatro traducidas del alemán" (Schlegel's Reflections upon Theatre as Translated from German) in the newspaper El Mercurio Gaditano. This article identifies Romanticism with absolutism and argues for a return to traditional and Catholic thought. It totally condemns the Enlightenment and exalts Spanish nationalism. The theater of Calderón de la Barca is treated as a symbol of the Spanish spirit, and any dislike of it is deemed unpatriotic. The contemporary Neo-classical Enlightenment writer José Joaquín de Mora countered that the worst thing to befall Spanish culture was the work of Calderón, in which bad taste was the norm. This exchange ignited a row between the two that would appear in newspapers in Madrid. Between 1818 and 1819, Böhl de Faber published in the Diario Mercantil Gaditano a series of articles defending Spanish theater of the Siglo de Oro, a genre much maligned by the Spanish Neo-Classicists who rejected its style along with the reactionary and traditionalist ideology it represented. Mora and Antonio Alcalá Galiano, liberal authors who would later become fervent Romantics, argued bitterly against him. Mora's words especially focused on the way that Faber's own wife was a vocal admirer of Calderón, and that she ran an ultra-Catholic tertulia in Cádiz. Additionally, whereas Faber was a supporter of Fernando VII, Mora and Alcalá Galiano were liberals; the ideological divide provoked still more disputes and the controversy became rife with personal attacks.

Nevertheless, Böhl remained an active publicist whose labor did much to bring traditionalist Romanticism to Spain. He published articles about English poetry derived from Romanticism. With the end of the Trienio Liberal of the 1820s, Mora and Alcalá Galiano left Spain with other liberal emigrants, though in order to better counter Böhl de Faber they had to study Schlegel's theories concerning the Romancero and the theater of the Siglo de Oro, and in this way Romanticism was introduced into Spain. Faber actually became one of its progenitors in the country. Faber associated Christianity with Romanticism and maintained that the movement had already occurred in medieval Spain and that Neo-Classicism constituted an interruption to the true indigenous Spanish cultural tradition. He would also eventually publish essays about Lope de Vega as well as Calderón de la Barca and a collection of romances and popular poetry.

== Bibliography ==
- Guillermo Carnero Arbat, "Documentos relativos a Juan Nicolás Böhl de Faber en el Ministerio español de Asuntos Exteriores" Anales de literatura española 1984 núm. 3 p. 159-186
