= 1658 in literature =

This article contains information about the literary events and publications of 1658.

== Events ==
- March 5 – A play adapted from The Taming of the Shrew is performed by students of the Gymnasium in Zittau, the earliest record of a Shakespearean comedy produced anywhere in the Holy Roman Empire; authorship is attributed to Christian Keymann, but remains disputed. This climate inspires the Silesian playwright Andreas Gryphius. Also this year, he prints one of the first secular Baroque works in German literature, the verse comedy Absurda Comica oder Herr Peter Squenz. Borrowing from A Midsummer Night's Dream (including its main character, Peter Quince), Gryphius' text rejects Meistersinger culture, while also "reinvigorating the tradition" of German-language theater after the long hiatus of the Thirty Years' War.
- April – Blaise Pascal enters the creative period that will lead to his Pensées, with a lecture for his Jansenist friends at Port-Royal-des-Champs Abbey, and later with a series of scattered notes.
- May 29 – Dara Shukoh, heir-apparent to the crown of the Mughal Empire, is defeated by his younger brother, Aurangzeb, in the Battle of Samugarh. Dara's overtures toward Vedanta and Sufism, including his promotion of the Upanishads, are condemned, as Aurangzeb formally adheres to Islamic fundamentalism – and in practice to a less syncretic theism. The new regime has a working alliance with the Pashtun warrior-poet Khushal Khattak, until the latter is deposed and arrested in 1663.
- July 6 – Teimuraz, deposed ruler of Kakheti and pioneer of Georgian poetry, is received in Moscow, Tsardom of Russia. An incident involving Bogdan Khitrovo contributes to the internal conflicts within the Russian Orthodox Church, generating the Raskol.
- September 5 – Forces of the Ottoman Empire and Crimean Khanate, under the command of Köprülü Mehmed Pasha, storm into the Transylvanian capital of Feyérvár (Alba Iulia). The city is devastated, and its role in fostering Renaissance humanism is forever ended: though restored, the Bethlen Collegium is transferred to Nagyenyed (Aiud). Approximately 20,000 books are destroyed in the raid, and at least 53 students are killed. This attack also brings to a standstill the Transylvanian printing press, which had been established around 1622. A new press is founded at Nagyszeben (Sibiu).
- September 13 (O. S. September 3) – Death of Oliver Cromwell in England, inaugurating the transition from Protectorate to Restoration. The event inspires Andrew Marvell to write "A Poem upon the Death of his Late Highness the Lord Protector"; this piece is not included in the official edition of Cromwellian panegyrics, which has verse by John Dryden, Thomas Sprat, and Edmund Waller. All these poets, alongside John Milton, will be ridiculed in Richard Watson's 1659 pamphlet, The Panegyrike and the Storme.

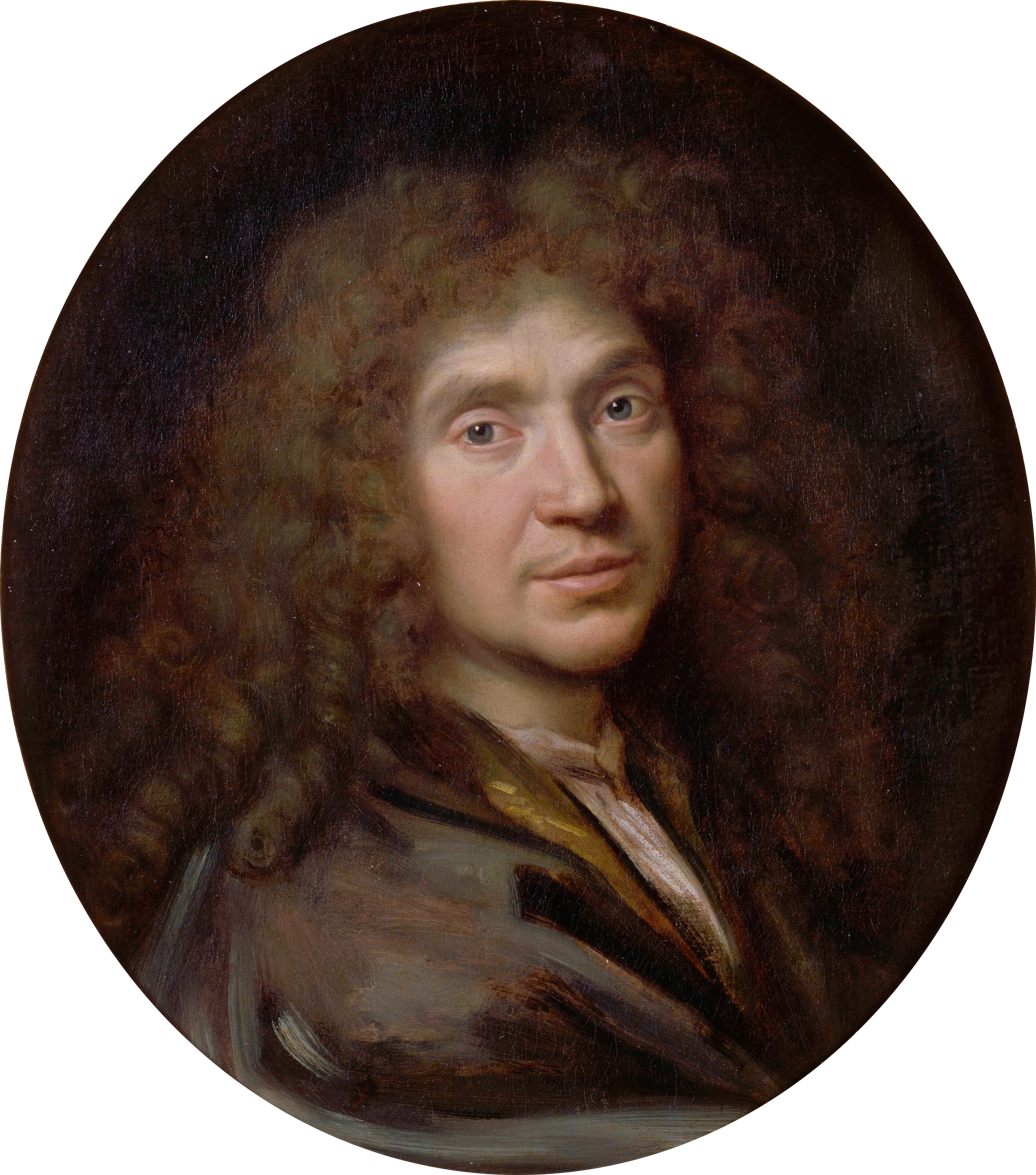
Molière in or around 1658. Portrait by Pierre Mignard

- c. October 24 – Molière arrives in Paris to act at the Louvre Palace. He performs with his troupe in front of King Louis XIV in Pierre Corneille's tragedy Nicomède and in his own farce Le Docteur Amoureux (The Doctor in Love). The troupe is granted Monsieur's patronage and allowed to use the Petit-Bourbon, alongside Giacomo Torelli's rival company.

unknown dates

  - Arakel of Tabriz is persuaded by Jacob IV, pontiff of the Armenian Apostolic Church to resume work on his Book of Histories, which will be completed in 1662.
  - Czech educationist John Amos Comenius publishes Orbis Pictus (Visible World), "internationally recognised as the first text written specifically for children." In associating Latin words with "the representation of most things capable of being set out in Pictures" it endures as "extremely popular in seventeenth-century Europe." From his home in the Dutch Republic, Comenius also directs a Bible translation into the Ottoman Turkish language. The endeavor, which also involves Jacobus Golius, Levinus Warner and Wojciech Bobowski, is still unfinished by the time of Comenius' death in 1670.
  - Étienne de Flacourt of the French East India Company publishes his part history, part memoir, work on Madagascar. Partly written as a plea for colonial sponsorship, it is dedicated to Nicolas Fouquet, the Superintendent of Finances. Flacourt's book introduces various theories, including one about the Jewish and Arabic origins of the Malagasy people; it is additionally noted for explaining the establishment of Fort Dauphin as an enterprise "for profit and gain, no matter how draped in the beautiful colors of religion."
  - Andrzej Maksymilian Fredro completes Przysłowia mów potocznych (Proverbs of Common Speech), containing a selection of Polish proverbs and his own aphorisms. The book is also a justification for Sarmatism and "Golden Liberty", with hints of xenophobia.
  - In Temeşvar Eyalet, Mihail Halici Sr. begins his translations from the Psalms, using Clément Marot's version in a Hungarian intermediary. These are noted as early samples of Romanian-language poetry, as well as for discarding Cyrillic in favor of Romanization.
  - Johann Heinrich Hottinger, a scholar based in Zürich, publishes his Promtuarium sive Bibliotheca Orientalis, which becomes a main reference work for Orientalism.
  - Hu Zhenheng's comprehensive collection of Tang poetry begins publication; the tenth and final volume (唐音癸籤, Tang yin gui qian), containing Hu's own literary criticism, is the first to be printed.
  - Mihnea III, Prince of Wallachia, begins his purge of boyardom. The scholar and poet Udriște Năsturel, who has been serving as Spatharios, is reportedly among those slaughtered in Bucharest.
  - Edward Phillips continues the Chronicle of the Kings of England from the Time of the Romans' Government unto the Death of King James (originally by Richard Baker) to this date.
  - The Polish Brethren are repressed and expelled, prompting poet Wacław Potocki to embrace Catholicism.
  - Georg Stiernhielm, a nobleman of the Swedish Empire, publishes his epic poem Hercules. Inspired in part by Jacob Cats' blasons, it stimulates a Baroque in Swedish literature. Hercules is also the first Swedish poem in hexameters.

== New books ==
=== Fiction ===
- Antoine Furetière – Nouvelle Allégorique, ou histoire des derniers troubles arrivés au royaume d'éloquence (New Allegory, or the History of the Latest Troubles in the Realm of Eloquence)

=== Children and young people ===
- John Amos Comenius – Orbis Pictus (Visible World)

=== Drama ===
- William Chamberlayne – Love's Victory
- Aston Cockayne – Trappolin Suppos'd a Prince
- William Davenant – The Cruelty of the Spaniards in Peru (musical)
- Jean Ogier de Gombauld – Les Danaïdes: tragédie
- Andreas Gryphius – Absurda Comica oder Herr Peter Squenz
- Thomas Dekker, John Ford, and William Rowley (all posthumous) – The Witch of Edmonton (1621; first published)
- William Lower – The Enchanted Lovers (published)
- Thomas May (died 1650) – The Old Couple
- Jasper Mayne
  - The City Match (published)
  - The Amorous War (published)
- Thomas Meriton
  - Love and War (published)
  - The Wandering Lover (published)
- Gilbert Swinhoe – Unhappy Fair Irene (published)
- Leonard Willan – Orgula, or the Fatal Error (published)

=== Poetry ===
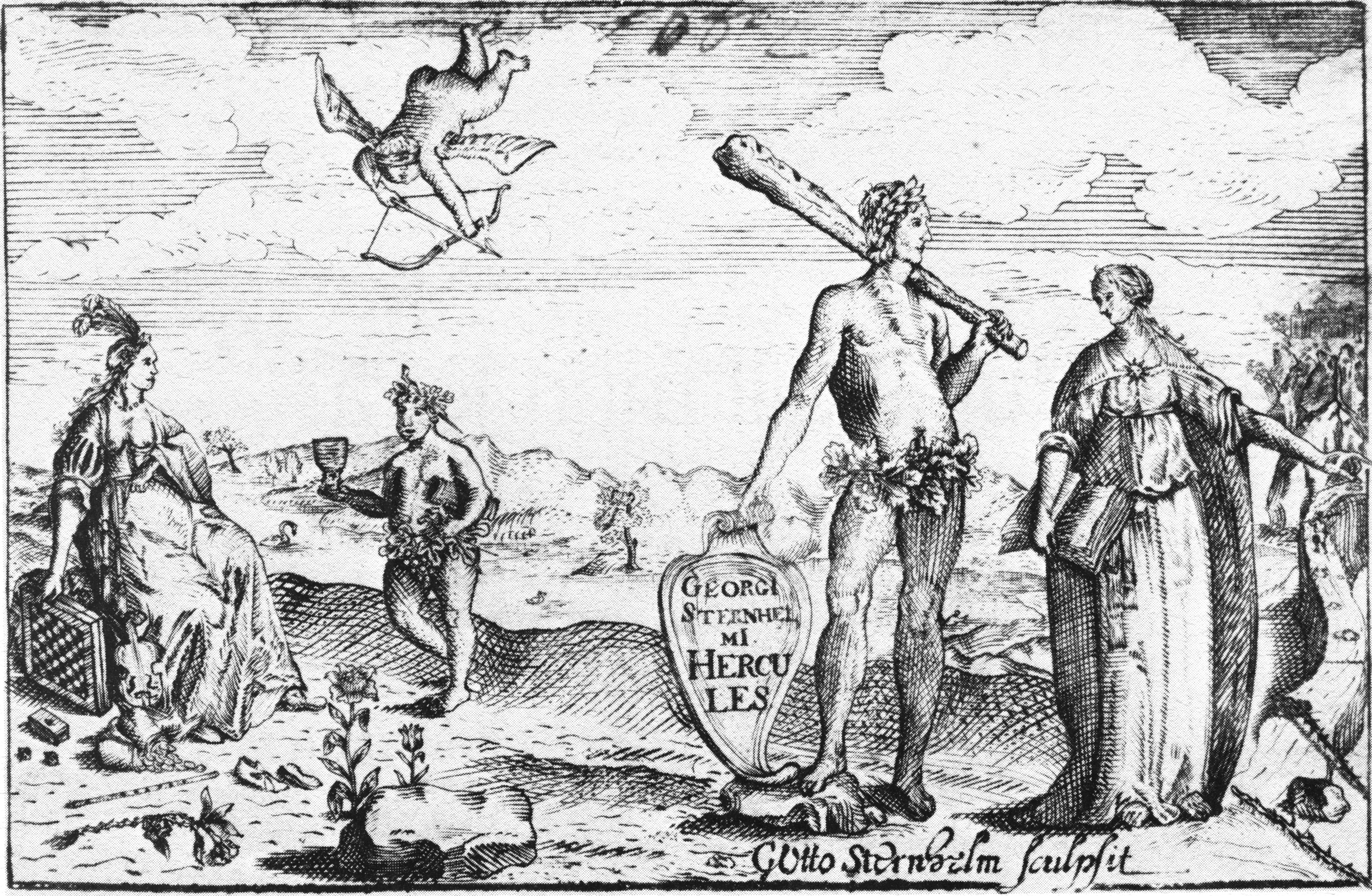
Illustration to Georg Stiernhielm's Hercules, from the original edition

- Richard Brathwait – "The Honest Ghost; or, A Voice from the Vault"
- Georges de Brébeuf – Poésies diverses (Various Poems)
- Jacob Cats – Proefsteen van den Trou-ringh (Touchstone of the Wedding Ring)
- Aston Cockayne – Small Poems of Divers Sorts
- Sidney Godolphin and Edmund Waller – The Passion of Dido for Aeneas
- Andrew Marvell – "A Poem upon the Death of his Late Highness the Lord Protector"
- Antoine Girard de Saint-Amant – Dernier recueil (Final Collection)
- Georg Stiernhielm – Hercules
- Jan van Vliet – Caecilia Bredana, sive ad Serenissimum Magnae Britanniae, Franciae atque Hibemise Regem Carolum II. Elegia et alia

=== Non-fiction ===
- Savoy Declaration
- The Whole Duty of Man (perhaps by Richard Allestree)
- Thomas Browne
  - The Garden of Cyrus
  - Hydriotaphia, Urn Burial
- Jean Desmarets – Les Délices de l'esprit (Spiritual Delights)
- John Dodderidge – The Several Opinions of Sundry Learned Antiquaries
- Richard Farnworth – A Confession and Profession of Faith in God
- Étienne de Flacourt
  - Dictionnaire de la langue de Madagascar (Dictionary for the Language of Madagascar)
  - Histoire de la grande isle de Madagascar (History of the Grand Island of Madagascar)
- Andrzej Maksymilian Fredro – Przysłowia mów potocznych (Proverbs of Common Speech)
- John Gadbury – Genethlialogia, or the Doctrine of Nativities
- Pierre Gassendi – Syntagma philosophicum (posthumous)
- Johann Heinrich Hottinger – Promtuarium sive Bibliotheca Orientalis
- Hu Zhenheng – Tang yin gui qian (唐音癸籤, posthumous)
- Christiaan Huygens – Horologium
- Kamalakara – Siddhāntatattvaviveka
- Antonio de León Pinelo
  - Acuerdos del Concejo de Indias (Pacts of the Council of the Indies)
  - Anales o historia de Madrid desde el nacimiento de Cristo Señor nuestro hasta el año 1658 (Annals or History of Madrid from the Birth of Our Lord Jesus Christ to the Year 1658)
- Samuel Morland – The History of the Evangelical Churches in the Valleys of Piemont
- John Owen – Of the Divine Originall, Authority, Self-evidencing Light, and Power of the Scriptures
- Edward Phillips
  - Mysteries of Love and Eloquence
  - A New World in Words, or a General Dictionary
- Thomas Willis – Diatribae duae medico-philosophicae (On Two Arguments in Medical Philosophy)

== Births ==
- February 18 – Charles-Irénée Castel de Saint-Pierre, French philosopher (died 1743)
- March 23 – Giovanni Maria Ciocchi, Tuscan painter and art critic (died 1725)
- March 30 – Muro Kyūsō, Japanese philosopher (died 1734)
- May 24 – Timothy Rogers, English essayist and self-help writer (died 1728)
- July 10 – Luigi Ferdinando Marsili, Bolognese naturalist and travel writer (died 1730)
- August 16 – Ralph Thoresby, English historian (died 1725)
- August 18 – Jan František Beckovský, Czech historian and theologian (died 1722)
- August 28 – Honoré Tournély, French Catholic theologian (died 1729)
- September 1 – Jacques Bernard, Dutch journalist and Huguenot theologian (died 1718)
- September 4 – Luis de Salazar y Castro, Spanish historian (died 1734)
- September 11 – Maria do Ceo, Portuguese novelist, playwright and poet (died 1753)
- September 16 – John Dennis, English dramatist and critic (died 1734)
- October 11 – Christian Heinrich Postel, Saxon poet and librettist (died 1705)
- October 21 – Henri de Boulainvilliers, French historian, philosopher and translator (died 1722)
- November 4 – Sulkhan-Saba Orbeliani, Georgian fabulist and lexicographer (died 1725)
- December 7 – Silahdar Findiklili Mehmed Agha, Ottoman historian (died 1723)
- Unknown dates
  - Elizabeth Barry, English actress (died 1713)
  - Awnsham Churchill, English printer and bookseller (died 1728)
  - William Curtain, Irish poet and historian (died 1724)
  - Richard Duke, English satirist and poet (died 1711)
  - Shridhar Swami Nazarekar, Marathi poet and philosopher (died 1729)
  - Stefan Yavorsky, Ukrainian and Russian Orthodox theologian (died 1722)
- Probable year of birth – James Hog, Scottish Presbyterian theologian (died 1734)

== Deaths ==
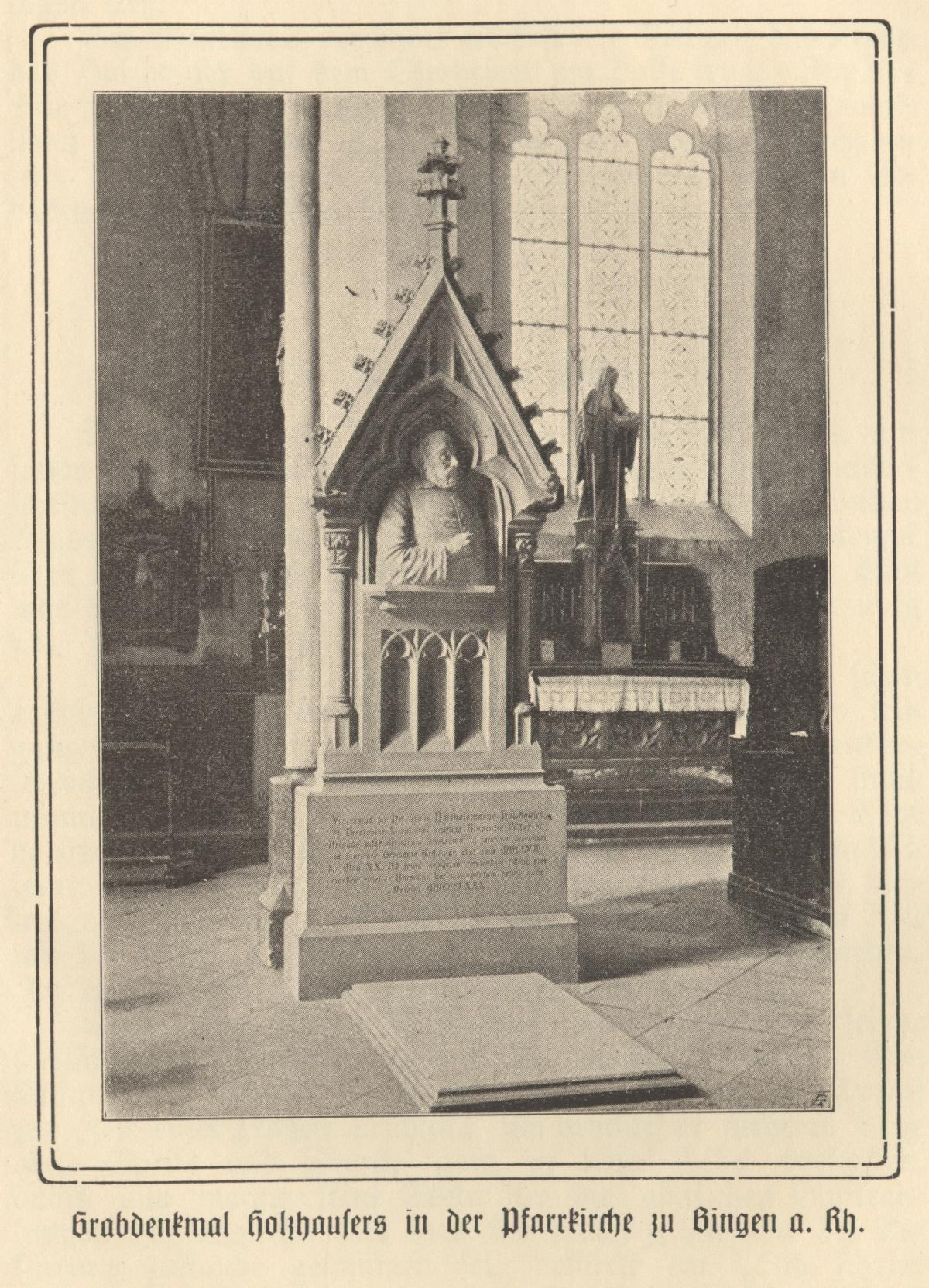
Bartholomew Holzhauser's tomb in Bingen am Rhein

- January 1 – Caspar Sibelius, Dutch Reformed theologian (born 1590)
- January 9 – Pierre-Jean Fabre, French physician, alchemist and essayist (born 1588)
- January 15 – John Colgan, Irish historian (born c. 1592)
- February 10 – Gerard Langbaine the elder, English philosopher and polemicist (born 1609)
- February 15 – Samuel Hoard, English Arminian polemicist (born 1599)
- March 5 – Francisco López de Zárate, Spanish poet and playwright (born 1580)
- March 6 – Ivan Bunić Vučić, Ragusan politician and poet (born 1592)
- April 7 – Juan Eusebio Nieremberg, Spanish Jesuit mystic and philosopher (born 1595)
- April 16 – Constantine Jessop, English Anglican theologian (born c. 1601)
- April 19 – Christoph Köler, Silesian poet and biographer (born 1602)
- April 29 – John Cleveland, English poet (born 1613)
- May
  - Patrick Hamilton, Scottish poet (born c. 1575)
  - John Wright, English printer and bookseller (year of birth unknown)
- May 10 – Robert Waring, English polemicist, poet, and Anglican priest (born 1614)
- May 20 – Bartholomew Holzhauser, Bavarian Catholic mystic (born 1613)
- May 31 – Benjamin Rudyerd, English poet and politician (born 1572)
- June 18 – Louis Cappel, French historian and Huguenot theologian (born 1585)
- c. June 15 – Henry Rogers, English polemicist and Anglican priest (born c. 1583)
- July 18 – Álvaro Semedo, Portuguese Jesuit missionary and travel writer (born c. 1585)
- August 11 – Antoine de Cousu, French music theorist and composer (born c. 1600)
- September? – Nehemiah Wallington, English Puritan chronicler and book collector (born 1598)
- September 17
  - Kaspar von Barth, Brandenburgian philologist (born 1587)
  - Georg Philipp Harsdörffer, Franconian-born poet and translator (born 1607)
- September 21 – Nuruddin ar-Raniri, Gujarati Islamic mystic and Malay lexicographer (born c. 1600)
- September 26 – Francisco de Borja y Aragón, Spanish Peruvian poet, essayist and statesman (born 1581)
- October 1 – Kim Yuk, Korean philosopher and literary theorist (born 1580)
- October 9 – Anthony Farindon, English Anglican theologian (born 1598)
- October 20 – Louis Cellot, French poet and Jesuit theologian (born 1588)
- November 4 – Antoine Le Maistre, French lawyer, translator, and Jansenist theologian (born 1608)
- November 5 – Thomas Bancroft, English poet (born c. 1596)
- November 6 – Pierre du Ryer, French dramatist (born 1606)
- November 15 – Jacobus Revius, Dutch poet, theologian and church historian (born 1586)
- November 30 – Andreas Sparman, Swedish physician, food writer and poet (born 1609)
- December 1 – Robert Harris, English Puritan theologian (born 1581)
- December 6 – Baltasar Gracián, Spanish Jesuit novelist and philosopher (born 1601)
- December 20 – Jean Jannon, Genevan printer (born 1580)
- Unknown dates
- John Allibond, English satirist and poet (born 1597)
  - Gabriel Bocángel, Spanish poet and dramatist (born 1603)
  - Christopher Cartwright, English polemicist, Anglican theologian, and historian (born 1602)
  - Nikoloz Cholokashvili, Georgian priest, lexicographer and publisher (in prison, born 1585)
  - Gil González Dávila, Spanish historian and biographer (born c. 1580)
  - Abba Gorgoryos, Ethiopian priest and lexicographer (at sea, born 1595)
  - Carlo Ridolfi, Venetian painter and biographer (born 1594)
  - Sen no Sōtan, Japanese poet (born 1578)
  - Pedro de Torres Rámila, Spanish poet, satirist and Renaissance humanist (born 1583)
  - Marcus Vulson de la Colombière, French heraldist, poet and historian (year of birth unknown)
- probable
  - John Jones of Gellilyfdy, Welsh scribe and book collector (born c. 1578)
  - Udriște Năsturel, Wallachian scholar and poet (lynched, born c. 1596)
