= Laurence Boswell =

British theatre director

Laurence Boswell (born 1959) is a British theatre director who has won a Laurence Olivier Award and received a Tony Award nomination. He served as Artistic Director of the Gate Theatre from 1992 to 1996, was Associate Director (and later Associate Artist) at the Royal Shakespeare Company, and was Artistic Director of the Ustinov Studio at Theatre Royal Bath. He is known for directing West End and Broadway productions starring Madonna, Eddie Izzard, Matt Damon, Jake Gyllenhaal and others.

== Early life and education ==
Laurence Boswell was born in 1959 in the UK. He grew up in Tile Hill, Coventry and began his illustrious theatrical career at the Belgrade Theatre, where he worked with a young Clive Owen for the first time. Boswell studied Drama at the University of Manchester and spent his summers directing at the Belgrade Theatre. He directed his brother Danny and Clive Owen in A Midsummer’s Night Dream, amongst other plays.

After graduation, he joined the Royal Shakespeare Company (RSC) as an assistant director at just 21 years old, working with fellow directors such as Michael Boyd and Trevor Nunn.

== Career ==
=== Gate Theatre (1991–1996) ===
Boswell joined the Gate Theatre in London as Associate Director (1991–1993), then became Artistic Director (1992–1996). He is known for an ambitious and highly successful Spanish Golden Age season: displaying British premieres of plays by Lope de Vega, Tirso de Molina and Pedro Calderón de la Barca, for which he translated several works and directed five productions. That undertaking won him the 1992 Laurence Olivier Award for Outstanding Achievement.

He also directed productions at the Gate including Madness in Valencia, Agamemnon’s Children, Bohemian Lights, Hecuba and The Painter of Dishonour.

=== Royal Shakespeare Company ===
Boswell served as Assistant Director and Associate Director (later Associate Artist) for the RSC. He curated and directed the RSC’s 2004 Spanish Golden Age season (which transferred to the West End and Madrid’s Teatro Español, where Boswell’s play received a twenty-minute ovation), as well as directing productions including The Dog in the Manger, Bartholomew Fair, The Painter of Dishonour, Women Beware Women and a much-loved, award-winning version of Beauty and the Beast.

=== West End and Broadway ===
In London’s West End, Boswell directed Ben Elton’s Popcorn; Madonna in Up for Grabs (2002); This Is Our Youth, featuring Matt Damon and Jake Gyllenhaal; Christopher Hampton’s Treats; and a revival of A Day in the Death of Joe Egg starring Eddie Izzard. The latter transferred to Broadway and earned him a Tony Award nomination, and also won the Drama Desk Award for Outstanding Revival of a Play.

=== Bath Studio (Ustinov Studio) ===
In April 2011 Boswell was appointed Artistic Director of the Ustinov Studio at Theatre Royal Bath. He programming series of international and European classics—often in new translations (some by him)—including Iphigenia, The Phoenix of Madrid, The Surprise of Love, Intimate Apparel, Trouble in Mind, and The Mother.

=== Recent Work ===
Since leaving The Ustinov, Boswell has been developing projects in a freelance capacity, including an adaptation of Fyodor Dostoevsky’s ‘A Dream of a Ridiculous Man’ which was performed at The Marylebone Theatre in April 2024 to critical acclaim. Other projects include an upcoming play for The Marylebone Theatre entitled ‘The Playwright’ and a future feature film entitled ‘A Question of Duty’, which he is attached to direct.

== Selected works ==
Year	Production	Role	Notes
1992–93	Spanish Golden Age cycle	Director / translator	Gate Theatre, Oliver Award for Outstanding Achievement.
2004	Beauty and the Beast	Director / playwright	RSC children’s season
2005	Hecuba, The Dog in the Manger, The Painter of Dishonour	Director	RSC
2006	Women Beware Women	Director	RSC Swan Theatre
1998–99	Popcorn	Director	West End, Olivier Award for Best Comedy
2001	A Day in the Death of Joe Egg	Director	West End → Broadway; Tony Award nomination
2002	This Is Our Youth	Director	West End debut of Damon & Gyllenhaal
2002	Up for Grabs	Director	Featuring Madonna
2011–2017+	Various premiering seasons	Artistic Director / director	Ustinov Studio, Bath

== Selected awards and nominations ==
- 1992 **Olivier Award**, Outstanding Achievement – for the Gate Spanish Golden Age season
- 2003 **Tony Award nomination**, Best Direction of a Play – for A Day in the Death of Joe Egg
- 1997 **TMA Award**, TMA Award for Best Play for Children and Young People - for Beauty and the Beast
