= Ignacio Suárez Llanos =

Spanish painter (1830–1881)

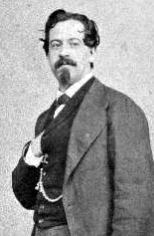
Ignacio Suárez Llanos; photograph by Jean Laurent (c. 1863)

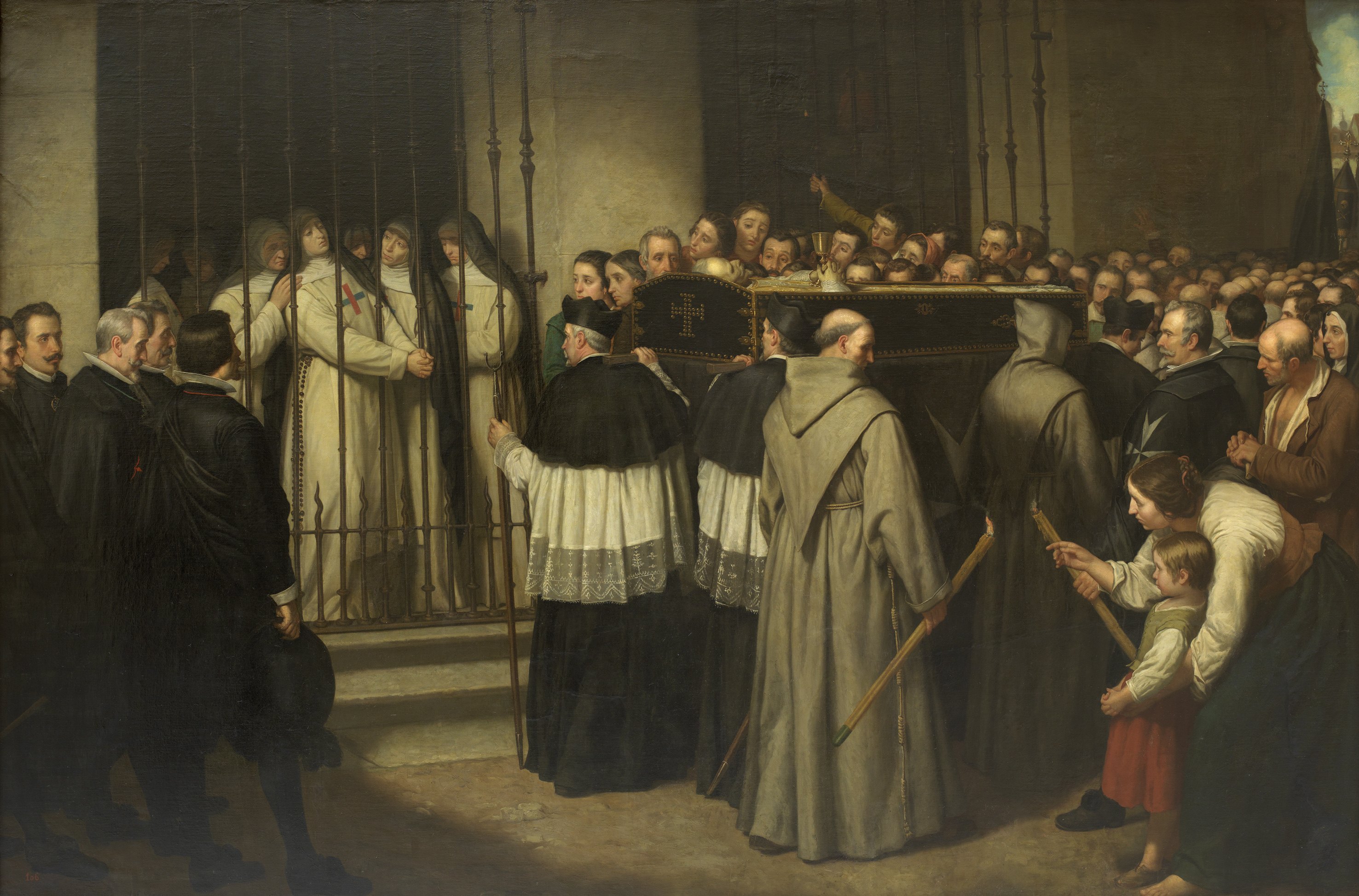
Sister Marcela de San Félix, Watching the Funeral of her Father, Lope de Vega, Pass By

Ignacio Suárez Llanos (31 July 1830 in Gijón – 25 December 1881 in Madrid) was a Spanish painter and illustrator who specialized in portraits.

== Biography ==
When he was still very young, he moved to Madrid. There, he began his studies at the Real Academia de Bellas Artes de San Fernando and its affiliated institution, the Escuela Superior de Pintura, where his teachers included Bernardino Montañés and Federico de Madrazo. Later, he received a scholarship from the Spanish government to continue his studies at the Spanish Academy in Rome.

He was a regular participant in the National Exhibition of Fine Arts, beginning in 1858, when his depiction of Caius Gracchus was instrumental in his being awarded the scholarship for Rome. He received a Third Class prize in 1860 for a scene from a classic folktale, La tía fingida (The Feigned Aunt). Two years later, he was awarded a First Prize for his rendering of a scene from the life of Sister Marcela de San Félix.

He is, however, best remembered for his portraits, which include those of Emilio Castelar, President of the First Spanish Republic, Práxedes Mateo Sagasta, who served several terms as prime minister, Queen María Cristina, the dramatists, Gaspar Núñez de Arce and Antonio García Gutiérrez, and the ceramicist, Daniel Zuloaga. Some of these have become standard illustrations for textbooks.

He was also a regular contributor of illustrations for the magazine, El Arte en España, and served as a jury member for numerous exhibitions.

From 1866, he was a professor at the Real Academia and, in 1873, was awarded the chair Pictorial Anatomy. In 1881, was named an Academician at the Real Academia, although he died, suddenly, before being able to formally accept the position.

== Selection of portraits ==
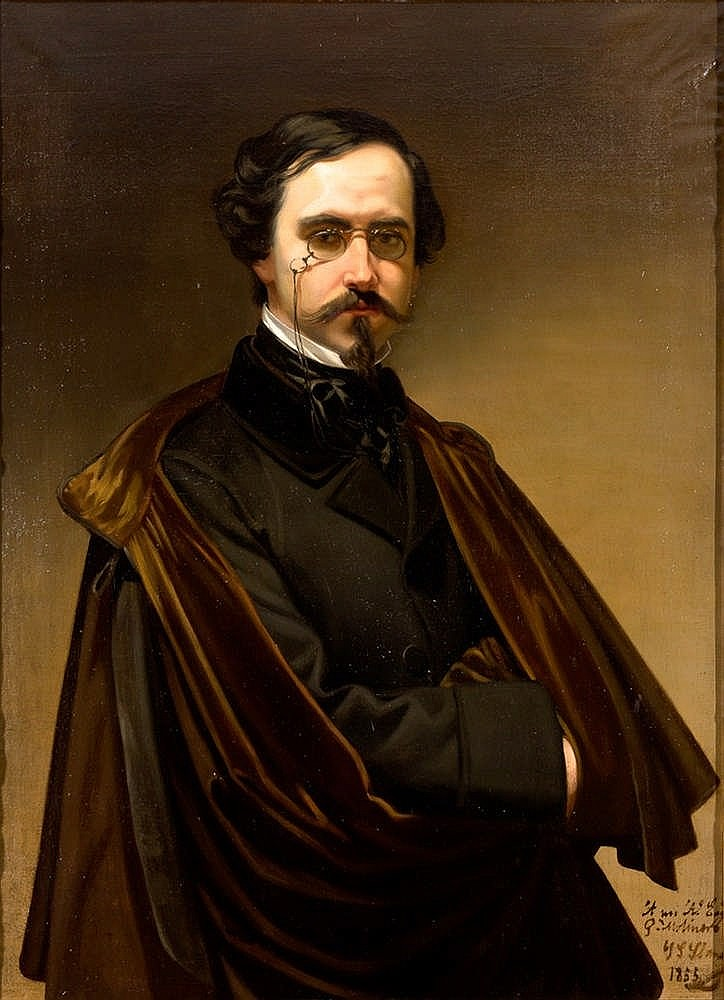
Portrait of gentleman

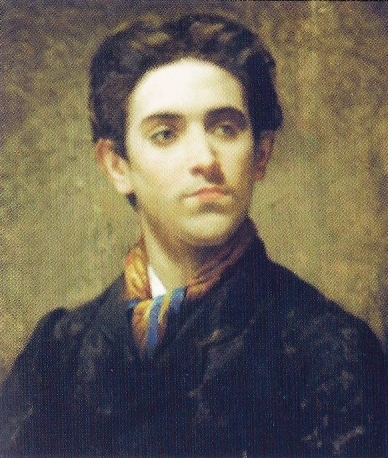
Daniel Zuloaga

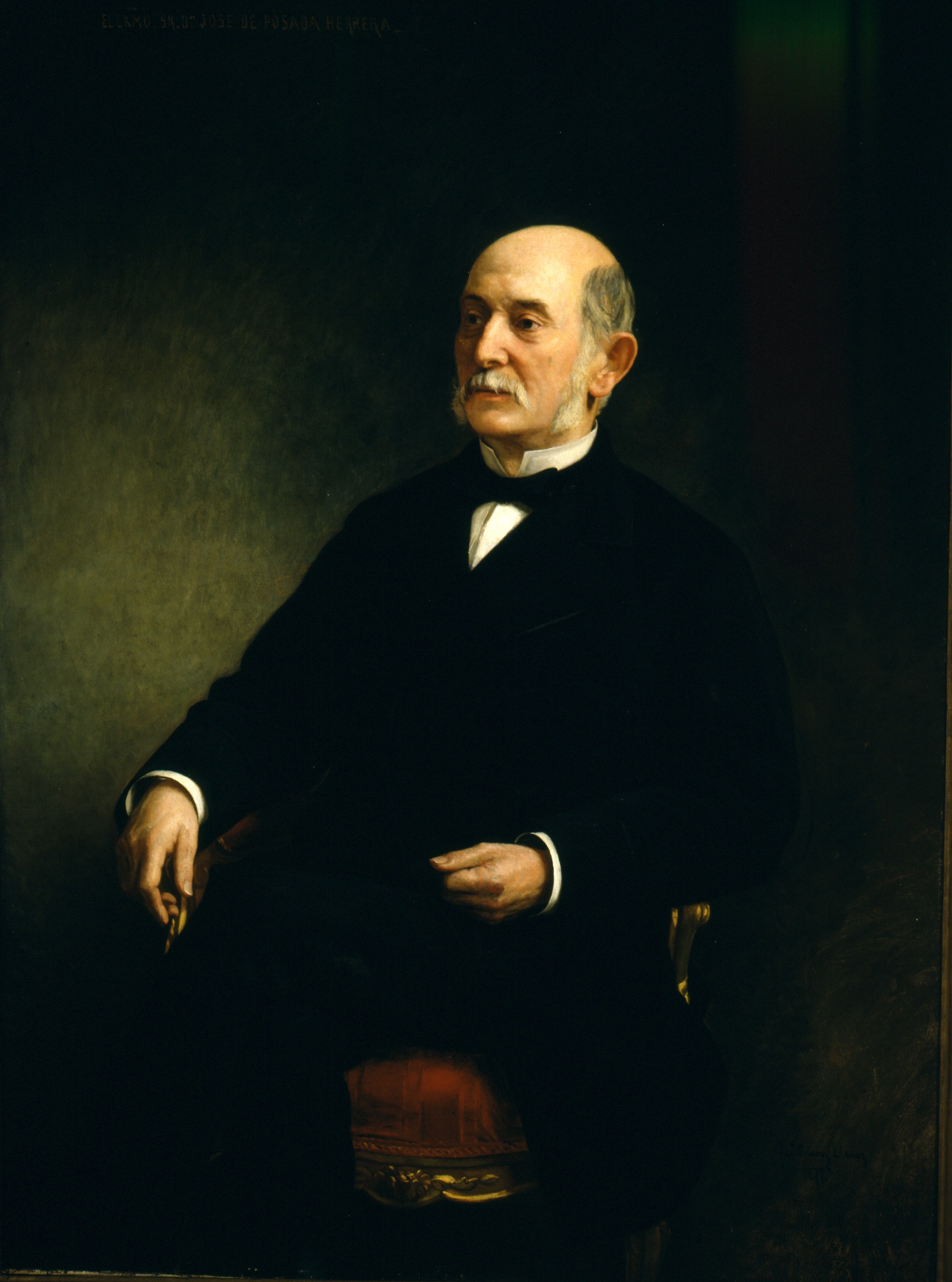
José Posada Herrera

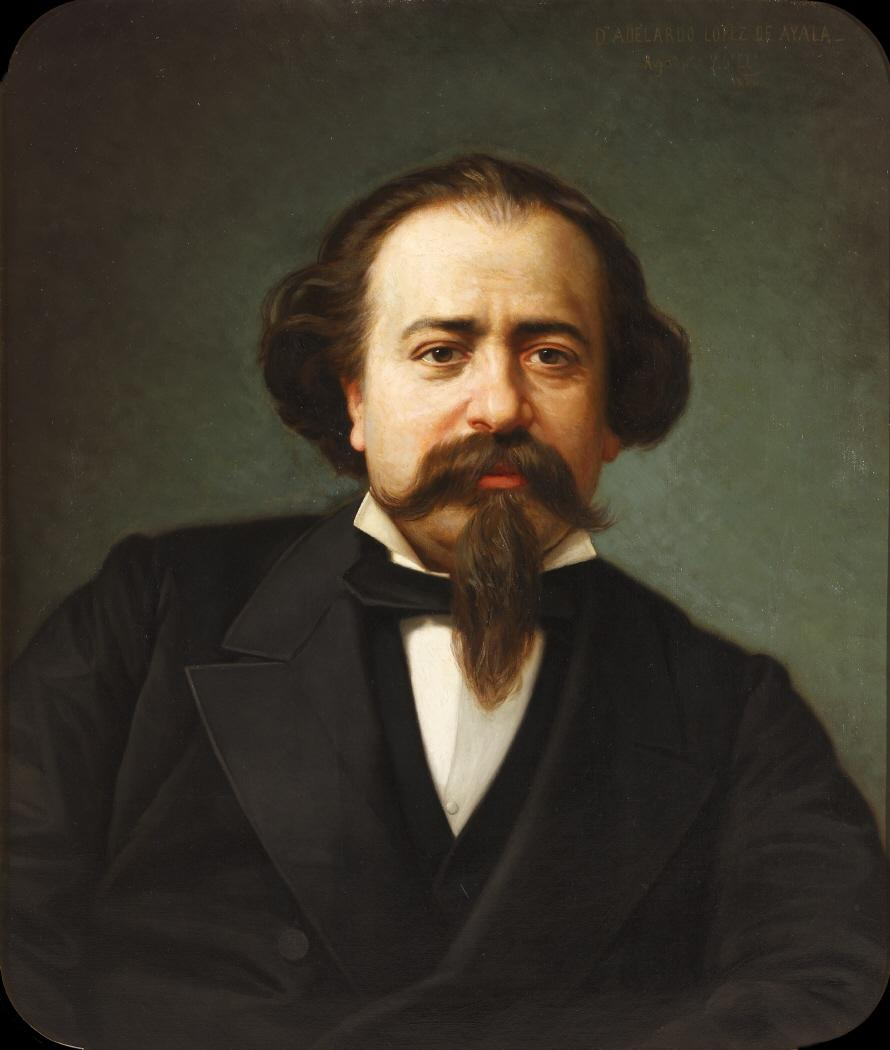
Adelardo López de Ayala
