= Leonato =

Leonato may refer to:

- Governor Leonato, a character in Much Ado About Nothing
- Leonato (tenor), a character in Alessandro
- Prince Leonato, a character in The Imposture
- Léonato, Governor of Messina, a character in Béatrice et Bénédict
- A character in Madness in Valencia

== See also ==
- Leonatos
