= Gaspar Núñez de Arce =

Spanish poet (1834–1903)

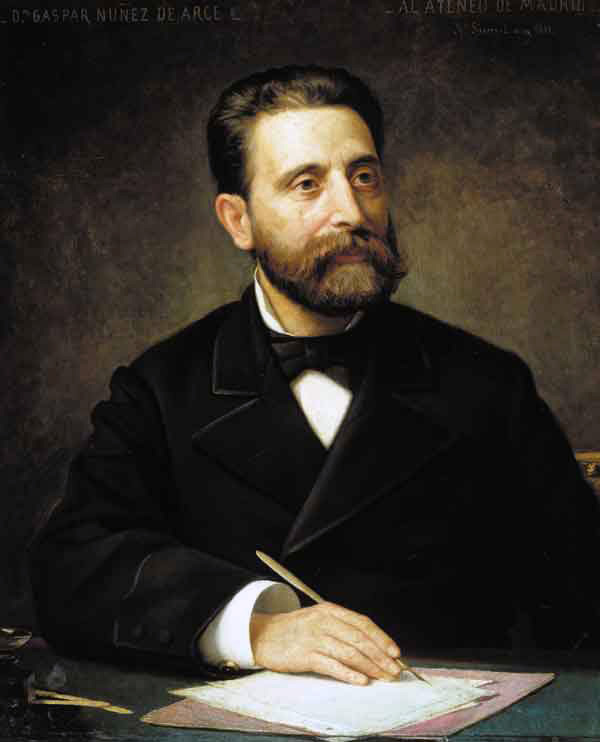
- Portrait by Ignacio Suárez Llanos
- Born: 4 August 1834; Valladolid, Spain
- Died: 9 June 1903 (aged 68); Madrid, Spain
- Occupations: Politician, poet, playwright

Seat T of the Real Academia Española
- In office 21 May 1876 – 9 June 1903
- Preceded by: Antonio de los Ríos Rosas
- Succeeded by: Eduardo de Hinojosa y Naveros

Gaspar Núñez de Arce (1834–1903) was a Spanish poet, dramatist and statesman. He was nominated for the Nobel Prize in Literature five times.

== Life ==
He was born at Valladolid, where he was educated for the priesthood. He had no vocation for the ecclesiastical state, plunged into literature, and produced a play entitled Amor y Orgullo which was acted at Toledo in 1849. To the displeasure of his father, an official in the post office, the youth refused to enter the seminary, and escaped to Madrid, where he obtained employment on the staff of El Observador, a Liberal newspaper. He afterwards founded El Bachiller Honduras, a journal in which he advocated a policy of Liberal concentration, and he attracted sufficient notice to justify his appointment as governor of Logroño, and his nomination as deputy for Valladolid in 1865.

He was imprisoned at Cáceres for his violent attacks on the reactionary ministry of Narváez, acted as secretary to the revolutionary Junta of Catalonia when Isabella II was dethroned, and wrote the "Manifesto to the Nation" published by the provisional government on 26 October 1868. During the next few years he practically withdrew from political life till the restoration, when he attached himself to Sagasta's party. He served under Sagasta as minister for the colonies, the interior, the exchequer and education; but ill-health compelled him to resign on 27 July 1890, and henceforth he refused to take office again. He was elected to the Spanish Academy on 8 January 1874 and was appointed a life-senator in 1886. He died at Madrid in February 1903.

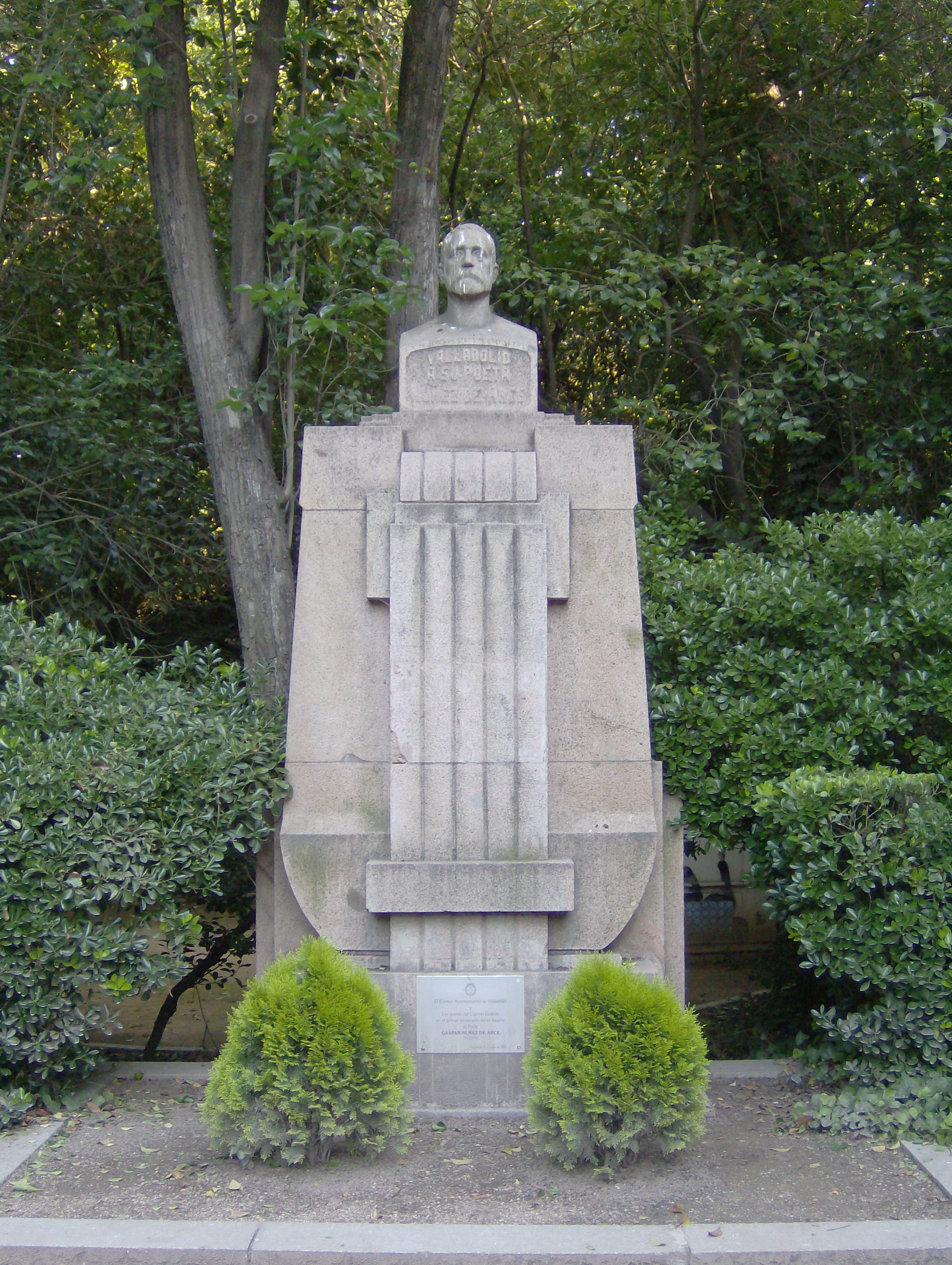
Bust of Gaspar Núñez de Arce, Valladolid.

Núñez de Arce first came into notice as a dramatist, and he remained faithful to the stage for nearly a quarter of a century. In addition to three plays written in collaboration with Antonio Hurtado, he produced ¿Quién es el autor? (1859), La cuenta del zapatero (1859), ¡Cómo se empeña un marido! (1860), Deudas de la honra (1863), Ni tanto ni tan poco (1865), Quien debe, paga (1867) and El haz de leña (1872).

But Núñez de Arce's talent was more lyrical than dramatic, and his celebrity dates from the appearance of Gritos del combate (1875), a collection of poems exhorting Spaniards to lay aside domestic quarrels and to save their country from anarchy, more dangerous than a foreign foe. He maintained his position (in popular esteem) as the only possible rival of Campoamor by a series of philosophic, elegiac and symbolic poems: Raimundo Lulio, Última lamentación de Lord Byron (1879), Un idilio y una elegía (1879), La selva oscura (1879) and La visión de Fray Martín (1880). The old brilliance sets off the naturalistic observation of La Pesca (1884) and La Maruja (1886). The list of his works is completed by Poemas cortos (1895) and ¡Sursum corda! (1900); Hernán el lobo, published in El Liberal (January 23, 1881) and Luzbel remain unfinished. His strength lies in the graciousness of his vision, his sincerity and command of his instrument; his weakness derives from his divided sympathies, his moods of obvious sentiment and his rhetorical facility. But at his best, as in the Gritos del combate, he is a master of virile music and patriotic doctrine.
