= Jean Ogier de Gombauld =

French playwright and poet

Jean Ogier de Gombauld (1576 – 1666) was a French playwright and poet.

Gombauld was born in Saint-Just-Luzac, County of Saintonge, France and was a Huguenot. He was one of the original members of the Académie française. He also wrote novels, but has been described as a mediocre novelist. He died in Paris.

== Works (selection) ==
- 1624: L'Endimion
- 1631: L'Amaranthe, pastorale
- 1646: Poésies
- 1658: Épigrammes
- 1647: Lettres
- 1658: Les Danaïdes, tragédie
- 1667: Traitez et Lettres touchant la religion
