= Marcela de San Félix =

Spanish nun

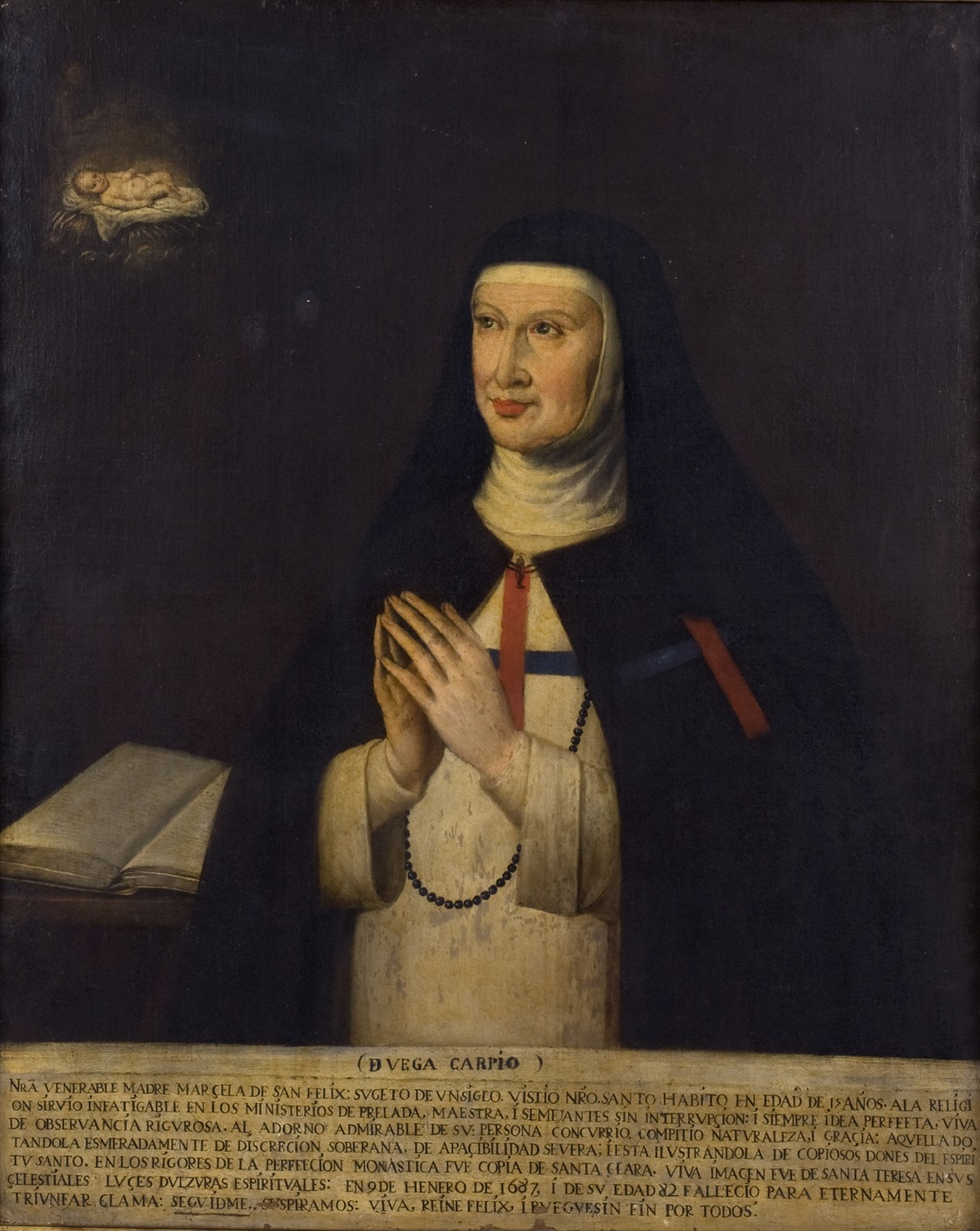
Sor Marcela de San Félix. David Serrano. (Casa-Museo de Lope de Vega).

Marcela de San Félix (1605–1688) was a Spanish nun who worked as a prelate, a teacher to novices, and housekeeper among several other jobs. However, Sor Marcela was also a poet, an actress as well as a dramatist.

For many women of the Middle Ages, the Renaissance, and Baroque periods to live a life completely retired from the world implied that they could live a life not only fully committed to God, but it also meant that they were able to devote time to their own writing, to their community and perhaps they could even have a place in the administration of their own convents. This is exactly what happened to Marcela del Carpio.

She was the illegitimate daughter of Lope de Vega and the actress Micaela de Luján. She adopted the name of Marcela de San Félix and lived in the convent of St. Ildefonse of the Discalced Trinitarians in Madrid since age sixteen until her death at the age of eighty-two years old.

== Bibliography ==
Centro Virtual Cervantes (2020). CVC. Tan sabia como valerosa. La escritura desde el convento. https://cvc.cervantes.es/literatura/sabia/01_03_convento.htm

Lewandowska, J. (2019). Marcela de San Félix. Escritoras Monjas de los Siglos de Oro. https://escritoras-monjas.al.uw.edu.pl/marcela-de-san-felix-o-ss-t/

Marcela de San Félix, Arenal, Electa & Sabat de Rivers, Georgina, Díez Borque, José Ma., (1988). Obra completa : coloquios espirituales, loas y otros poemas (1a. ed., Ser. Colección ediciones y estudios. estudios, 3). PPU.

Marcela Lope de Vega y Luján. (s. f.). Rah.es. https://dbe.rah.es/biografias/6234/marcela-lope-de-vega-y-lujan

Migueláñez Daniel. (2020). Cenizas de fénix : sobre vida y obra de lope de vega y sor marcela de san félix (1. ed., Ser. Pigmalión candilejas, 14). Pigmalión.

Muro, D. C. (2018). Silenciadas en sus propias carnes y hábitos. El caso de Sor Marcela de San Félix y María Jesús de Agreda. Las inéditas: voces femeninas más allá del silencio, 51-64.

Navarro, Ana (1989). Antología poética de escritoras de los siglos XVI y XVII. Madrid: Castalia-Biblioteca de Escritoras.

Sabat de Rivers, Georgina, y Arenal, Electa, (2016). Voces del convento: Sor Marcela, la hija de Lope. https://www.cervantesvirtual.com/nd/ark:/59851/bmc5q6w3
