= Micaela de Luján =

Spanish actress

Micaela de Luján (c. 1570–1614), was a Spanish actress. She was among the first professional actresses in Spain, being active in the 1590s. She became the mistress of dramatist Lope de Vega and is portrayed by him in his work under the name Carmila Lucinda. She and de Vega had 5 children, including the poet/playwright Marcela de San Felix.
