= St Sebastian's Church, Madrid =

Saint Sebastian Church
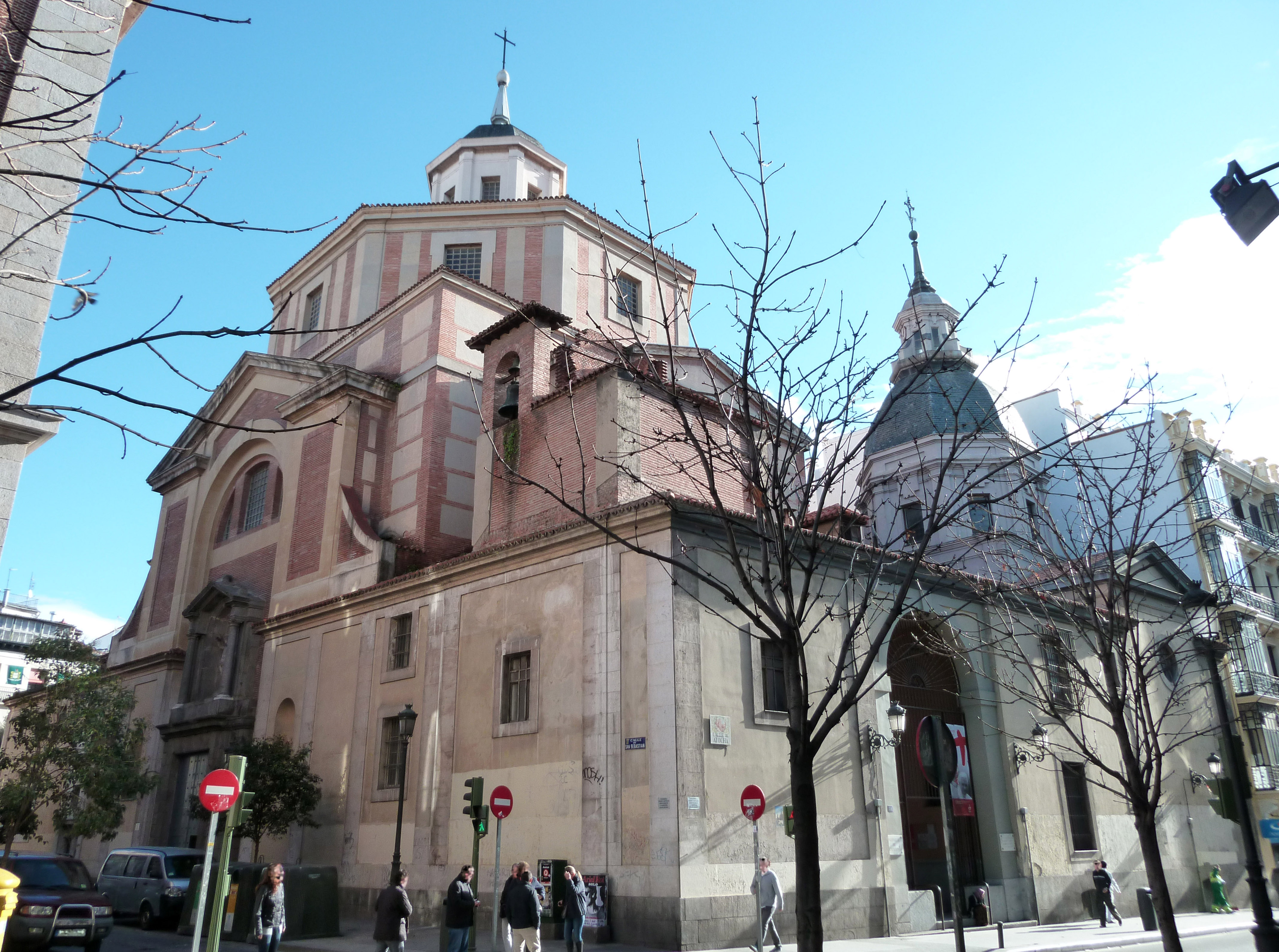
- View from the south-west angle

Religion
- Affiliation: Roman Catholic
- Diocese: Centro
- Region: Community of Madrid
- Ecclesiastical or organisational status: Parish church
- Status: Active

Location
- Municipality: Madrid
- State: Spain
- Interactive map of Saint Sebastian Church

Architecture
- Groundbreaking: 1554
- Completed: 1693
- Designated as NHL: 1969

Saint Sebastian Church
- Iglesia de San Sebastián (Spanish)
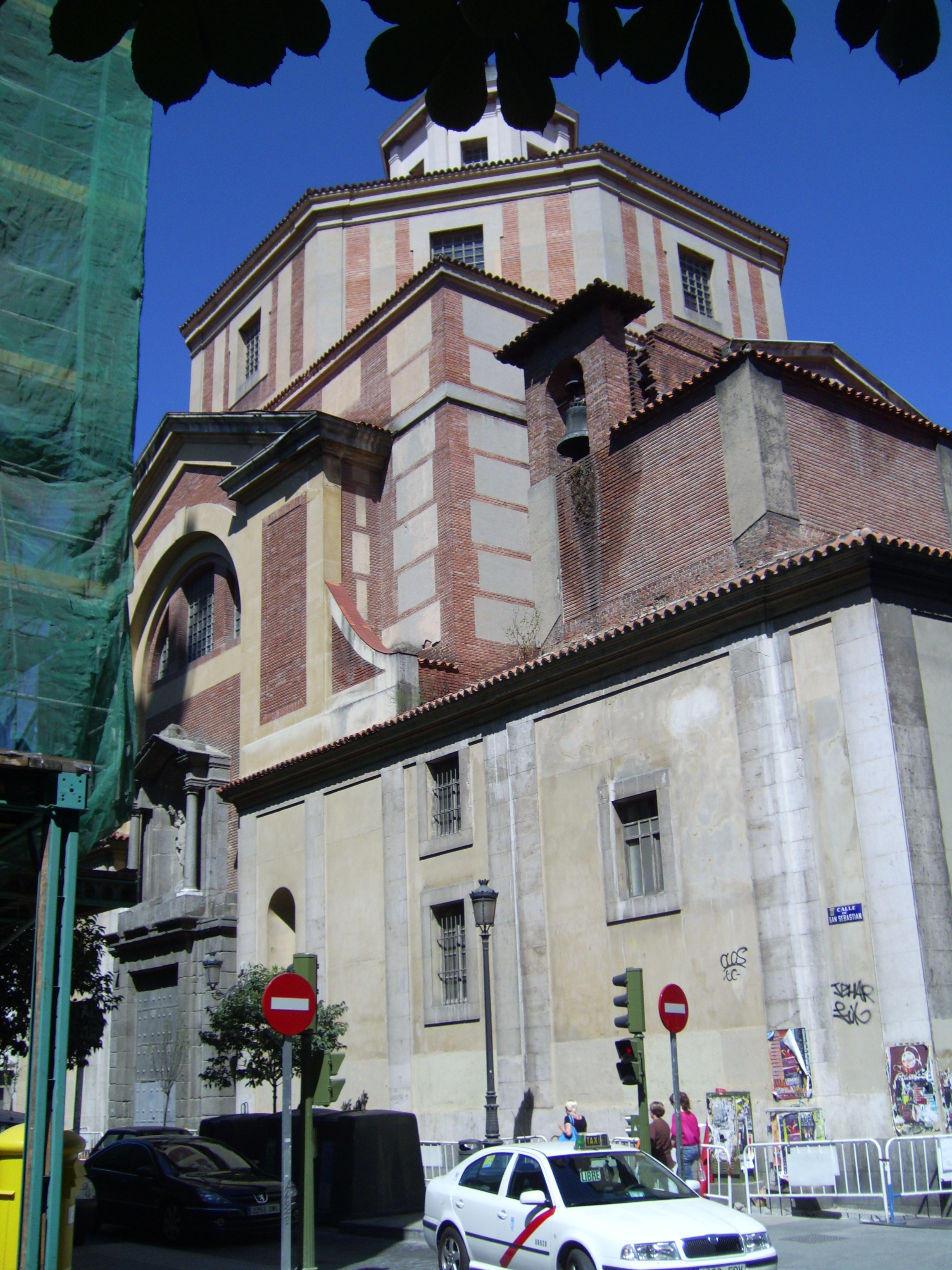

- Location within Spain
- 40.4137°N 3.7014°W
- Location: Madrid, Spain

Spanish Cultural Heritage
- Official name: Iglesia de San Sebastián
- Type: Non-movable
- Criteria: Monument
- Designated: 1969
- Reference no.: RI-51-0003831

The Saint Sebastian Church or Iglesia de San Sebastián is a 16th-century church in central Madrid, Spain. It is located on Atocha street, #39.

The name arises from a devotional chapel (ermita) which was found along the route to the Basilica of Nuestra Señora de Atocha, founded in 1541. The first architect around 1550 was Antonio Sillero, who also finished the Chapel of the Sagrado Corazón. This church like that of San Luis conserved for years the rights of asylum for those escaping official persecution. More chapels and enlargements were added by Antonio de la Tijera, Juan de Bulga Valdelastras, and Juan de Obregón between 1595 and 1598. The tower was built in 1612 by Lucas Hernández. During the Spanish Civil War, the church was sacked by Republican forces, before it ended up being almost destroyed during a bombing raid by the Nationalists around November 20, 1936. This caused many of the works to be transferred to other sites. For example, the icon of San Blas was moved to the convent of San Jerónimo el Real). The church was rebuilt in a different orientation by Francisco Íñiguez Almech between 1943 and 1959. In 1969, it was declared a "Bien de Interés Cultural" in the category of monument.

== Chapels ==
The Chapel of Our Lady of Bethlehem, known as the "chapel of the architects", was built in 1693 with Francisco Moreno as director of the works, and remodeled by Ventura Rodríguez in 1766-1768. Both Ventura Rodríguez and Juan de Villanueva are buried here. The chapel is to the right of the entrance, protected by a crystal gate.

The Chapel of the Holy Heart was designed by Antonio Sillero.

== Historical importance ==
The archives of the church over the centuries have kept biographical data on numerous figures of renown, including:

=== Baptism ===
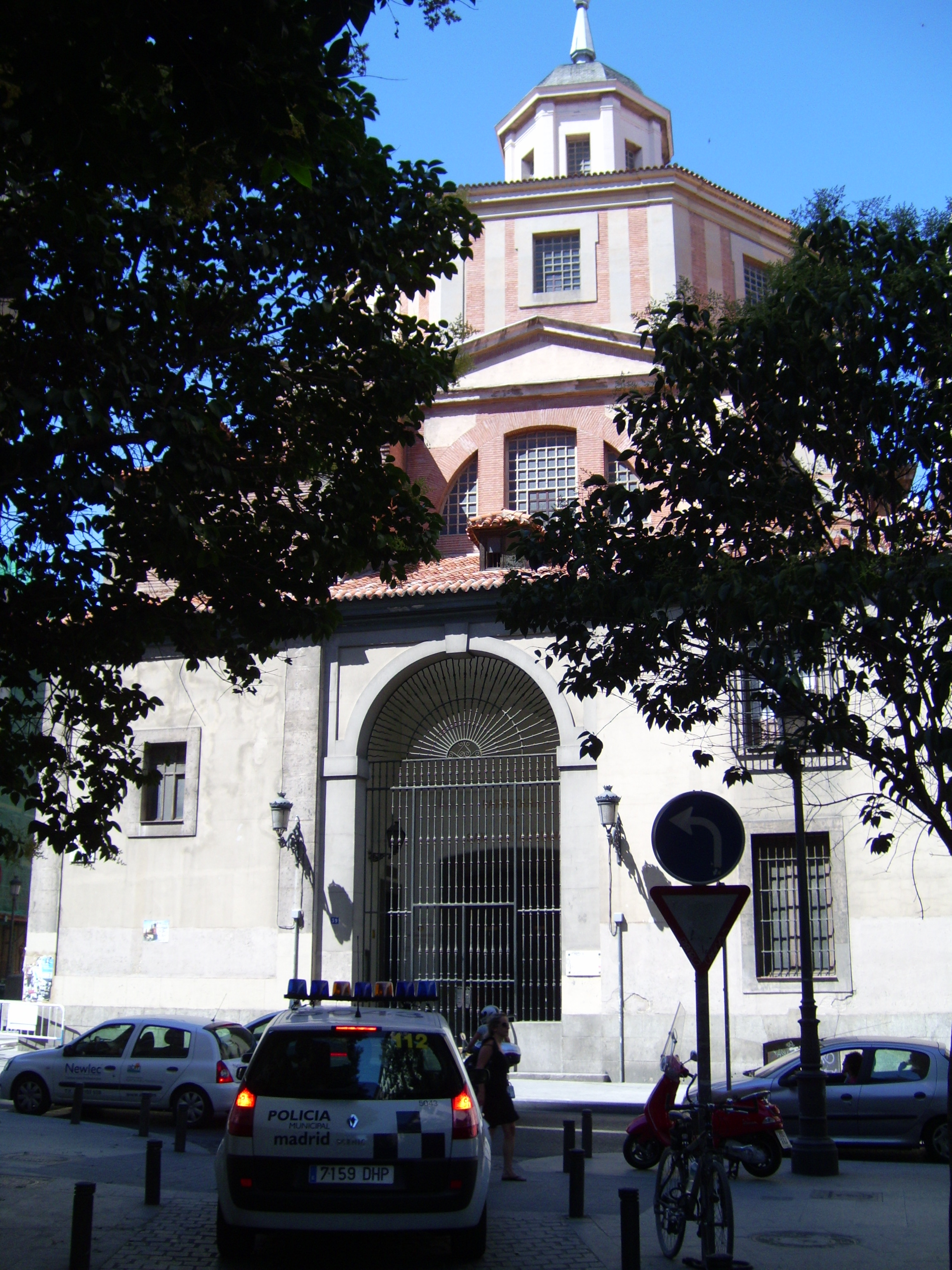
Facade calle Atocha.

- Ramón de la Cruz (1731)
- Leandro Fernández de Moratín (1760)
- Patricio de la Escosura (1807)
- Jerónimo María Usera y Alarcón (1810)
- Francisco Asenjo Barbieri (1823)
- Luis Madrazo Kuntz (1825)
- José de Echegaray (1832)
- Jacinto Benavente (1866)

=== Funeral services ===
- Miguel de Cervantes (1616)
- Lope de Vega (1635)
- Juan Ruiz de Alarcón (1639)
- Antonio de Pereda (1678)
- Ventura Rodríguez (1788)
- Ramón de la Cruz (1794)
- Nicolás del Campo (1803)
- Juan de Villanueva (1811)
- José de Espronceda (1842)

=== Weddings ===
- Gustavo Adolfo Bécquer
- Julián Romea
- Práxedes Mateo Sagasta
- Emilio Thuillier
- Mariano José de Larra

== Cemetery ==
The cemetery, at the union of Huertas and San Sebastian streets, has disappeared and is now replaced by a flower shop. In this cemetery Lope de Vega is buried. It also was the site of the ghoulish incident after the burial of actress María Ignacia Ibáñez, when her lover, the writer José Cadalso, lovelorn, attempted to dig up her body.

== See also ==
- Catholic Church in Spain
- List of oldest church buildings
