= Andreas Sparman =

Swedish doctor

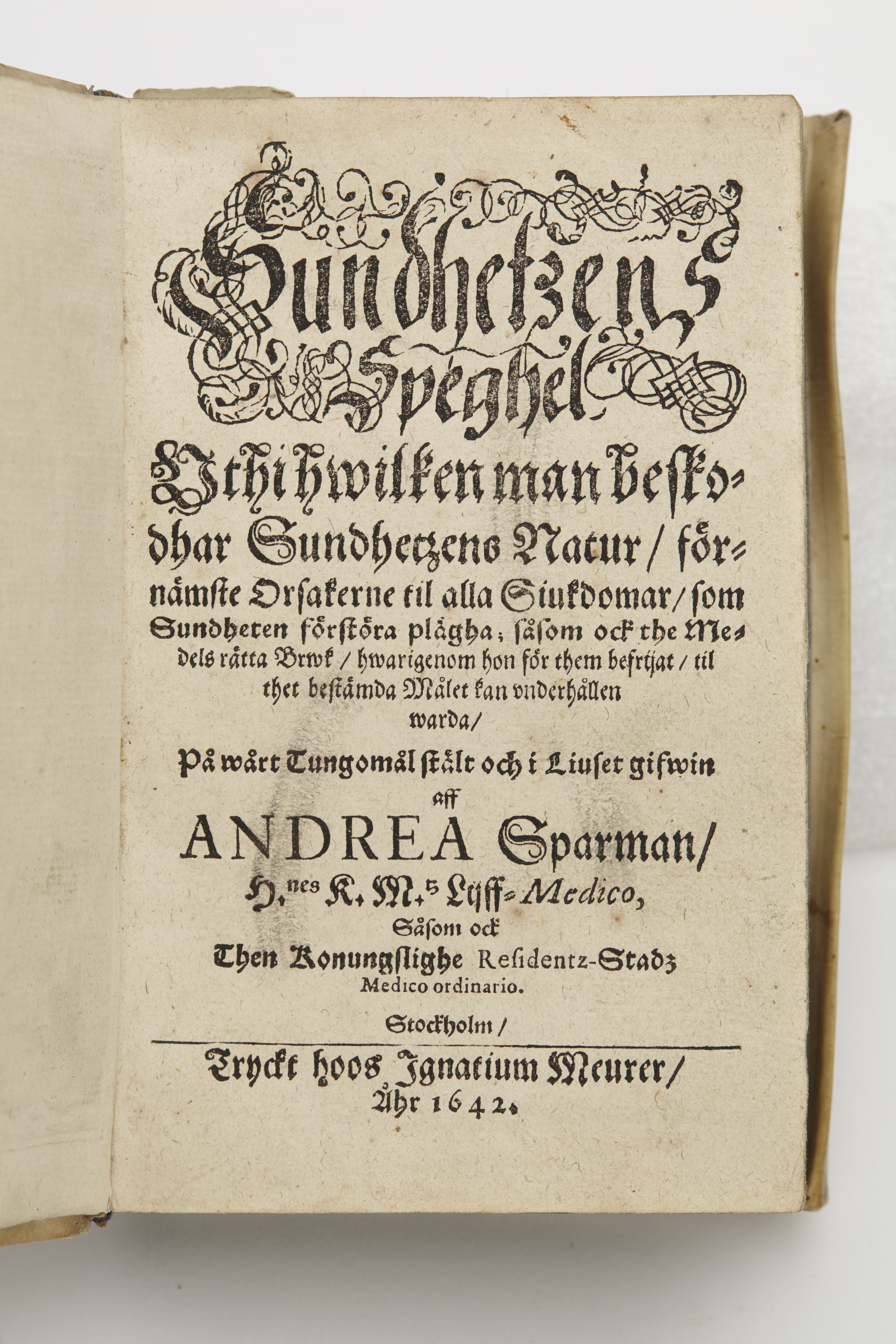
Sundhetzens Speghel (1642)

Andreas Sparman or Andreas Palmcron (1609 – November 30, 1658) was a Swedish medical doctor. He was the personal physician to Queen Christina and King Charles X Gustav of Sweden. He is most known for his book, Sundhetzens Speghel, a book on medical theory and practice.

== Life ==
Andreas Sparman was born Andreas Schomerus in Sparrsätra parish, Uppsala County, Sweden. He died in Stockholm. When he wrote his dissertation in 1629, he used the name Schomerus, but later changed his name to Sparrman, for his birthplace. He was knighted in 1647 with the name Palmcron.

Sparman's father was Nikolaus Olai. His mother was Susanna Andersdotter. His first wife was Helena Isaksdotter. His second wife was Susanna Lilliecrona. He had a daughter, Brita Susanna Palmkron, with his second wife.

Sparman studied medicine in Leiden, completing his studies in 1637. After he returned to Sweden he became the city doctor for Stockholm. Later, he was the personal doctor to Queen Christina and Charles X Gustav of Sweden.

== Books ==
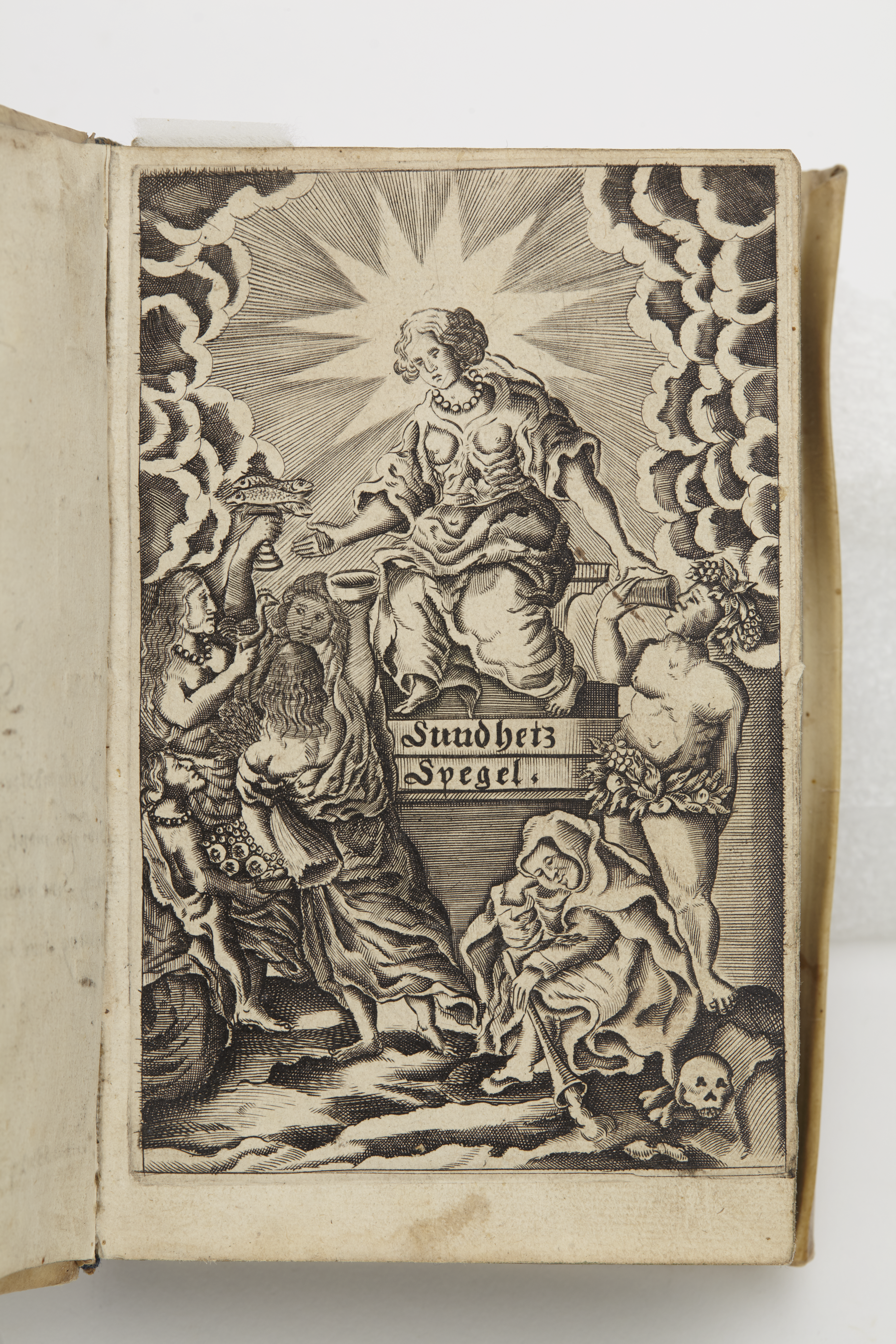
Sundhetzens Speghel (1642)

In connection with the plague epidemic in 1638, Sparman wrote an educational book about the plague. It was a summary of how to prevent and treat the disease. It was published again during plague epidemics in 1652 and 1710.

In 1642, Sparman wrote the most complete book yet published about preventive health care, Sundhetzen's Speghel, uthi hwilken man beskodhar Sundhetzens Natur,... or "Mirror of Health, from which one may learn the nature of health, the principal causes of all diseases which chiefly undermine health, together with the remedies which deliver us from them". It is considered the best läkebok or medical book of the century. Part of the book is written in the form of the alexandrine French poetry meter. It was probably based on some foreign works. Sparman's book warned about the medical dangers of alcohol.

Because of the severe rödsots or dysentery epidemics, in 1652 Sparman wrote about how to prevent dysentery.

Sparman also translated the hymns of the Psalms. He got permission to publish them, but they were never published.
