= Henry Rogers (priest) =

Henry Rogers (1583 or 1584 – 1658) was an English Anglican priest and writer.

== Life ==
Rogers was born in Herefordshire in 1583 or 1584 and matriculated at Jesus College, Oxford in 1602 at the age of eighteen. He obtained his Bachelor of Arts degree in 1605 and his Master of Arts degree in 1608, and was ordained at about this time. He became known as a preacher and schoolmaster, and was made a prebend of Hereford Cathedral in 1616, obtaining his Bachelor of Divinity degree shortly thereafter (with his Doctor of Divinity degree following in 1637). He held various parish positions in Herefordshire – Dorstone (before 1619), Moccas (1617–1636), Stoke Edith (1618–1646) and Foy (1636–1642). He was appointed lecturer at Hereford Cathedral in 1637 and canon residentiary in 1642.

Rogers was frequently in dispute with others on religious matters. In 1623, his arguments with John Fisher on the subject of Martin Luther were published without his prior knowledge, and he was also imprisoned in the Fleet for a time. His response to Fisher was published in 1637, under the title The Protestant Church Existent, and their Faith Professed in All Ages. He obtained the lectureship at Hereford Cathedral against the wishes of the Dean and chapter, with whom he was often arguing, through the influence of John Coke, the Secretary of State and George Coke, the Bishop of Hereford, with the support of Archbishop Laud.

He preached against the Roundheads during the English Civil War and was captured when Hereford fell to the Parliamentary forces in 1643. His parish positions were taken away from him and he suffered great financial hardship thereafter, despite assistance from friends. His date of death is not known, but he was buried in the church at Wellington, Herefordshire on 15 June 1658.
