= Pedro de Torres Rámila =

Spanish poet, satirist and Renaissance humanist

Pedro de Torres Rámila (Latin: Petro de Torres Ramilae) (1583—1658) was a Spanish poet, satirist and Renaissance humanist.

Rámila was born in Vilarcayo, Burgos. He was professor of humanities at the Colegio Trilingüe (Trilingual College), and in the Greater College of San Ildefonso, in Alcalá de Henares. He was also canon of the Complutensian church of SS. Justo and Pastor. He died in Alcalá de Henares.

In 1616 he submitted four poems to a contest of the chapel of the Sagrario in Toledo. The poems are lost, and are thought to have been of little literary merit. He signed them with the pseudonyms Trepus Ruitanus Lamira and Juan Pablo Ricci.

He owes his fame to the diatribes from an Aristotelian perspective against, principally, Lope de Vega, but also against Luis Tribaldos de Tolello, Padre Juan Luis de la Cerda and José Antonio González de Salas. He is especially remembered for the Latin satire Spongia (Paris, 1617), written probably in collaboration with Juan Pablo Mártir Rizo. The original work has been lost, due to its destruction by the enemies of Torres, but it was reconstructed by Joaquín de Entrambasaguas in his Una guerra literaria del Siglo de Oro: Lope de Vega y los preceptistas aristotélicos, Madrid, 1932. It contained personal attacks on Lope, as well as attacks on his dramatic theory and practice as defying Aristotelian norms. Writer Francisco López de Aguilar Coutiño, a friend of Lope de Vega, wrote Expostulatio Spongiae (1618) in rebuttal.

Torres Rámila served Cristóbal Suárez de Figueroa as the model of the character of the teacher in his El pasajero.
