= Nicomède =

Play written by Pierre Corneille

Nicomède is a tragedy by French dramatist Pierre Corneille, first performed in 1651.

== Characters ==
- Prusias, king of Bithynia
- Flaminius, Roman ambassador
- Arsinoé, Prusias' second wife
- Laodice, queen of Armenia
- Nicomède, older son of Prusias by his first marriage
- Attale, son of Prusias and Arsinoé
- Araspe, captain of Prusias' palace guard
- Cléone, Arsinoé's confidante

== The play ==
The source for the play is a 12-line section within a longer work by the ancient historian Justin on Rome's policies with respect to its allies, in particular the princelings of the East. Corneille, caught up as he was in the Fronde, then at its height, was inspired to write a play whose basic premise is a clash between aristocratic and political ideals - a clash between hero and state.

The tragedy portrays two brothers, Nicomède and Attale, both sons of the same father - Prusias, king of Bithynia. Attale, Prusias' son by his second wife Arsinoé, has been brought up in Rome, from where he has recently returned. Nicomède, by contrast, hates Rome, having been inspired by Hannibal's example: loyal, courageous and proud, he commands Prusias' army. The ambitious Arsinoé, who holds sway at court, dominating her husband, detests Nicomède, and seeks to put her young son on the throne in place of his older brother. In a further twist, Laodice, the young queen of Armenia who has been placed under the tutelage of Prusias by her father, is loved by both of the brothers, though her preference is for Nicomède.

The action: the people rise up in revolt, proclaiming Nicomède as their king after he falls victim to the machinations of Arsinoé, who has him removed after he arrives at court and placed in Roman custody (in the person of Roman ambassador Flaminius). However, a stranger releases him. With Prusias and Flaminius now opting to flee, Arsinoé finds herself without support when the prince-cum-hero Nicomède returns. Prusias and Flaminius, their predicament now dire, decide to return in order to die with her, but Nicomède chooses to pardon all three of them.

The mystery man who freed Nicomède turns out to be none other than Attale, and he it is who disentangles the web of intrigue. Despite this, however, all the plaudits fall on Nicomède. He returns to the throne, gradually taking over the reins of power over against the opposition of Prusias, who relinquishes them despite himself, having previously wanted to send Nicomède to Rome as a hostage. He closes the play with a response that is not far short of comedy, which has the effect of making him a king devoid of credibility. The way is then open for Nicomède, who gains both power and the love of Laodice thanks to his generosity of spirit. He calms the popular uprising that had been clamouring for him to be king, agreeing to live in friendly alliance with Rome if the empire will refrain from reducing the kingdom to servitude. Although family harmony is re-established at the end of the play, the genuineness of it seems to be very much in doubt.

Because of this apparently happy ending, Nicomède is sometimes not considered to be a genuine tragedy. Literary critics Gustave Lanson and Paul Tuffrau observe that tenderness and passion feature not at all in the play - a drama in which the idea of courage as a noble ideal reigns supreme.

== Works cited ==
- Lanson, Gustave; Tuffrau, Paul (1931). Manuel illustré d'Histoire de la Littérature Française des origines à l'époque contemporaine (in French). Paris: Hachette.
