= Nehemiah Wallington =

English diarist (1598–1658)

Nehemiah Wallington (1598–1658) was an English Puritan artisan (a wood turner) and chronicler from Eastcheap. He left over 2,500 pages and 50 volumes on himself, religion and politics, 8 of which survive.

== Life ==
Born on 12 May 1598, he was the tenth child of John Wallington (d. 1641), a turner of St. Leonard's, Eastcheap, by his wife Elizabeth (d. 1603), daughter of Anthony Hall (d. 1597), a citizen and skinner of London.

He recorded his ten suicide attempts of 1618–19; trying poison, hanging, and even contemplating drowning and cutting open his own throat– all because he took his lustful feelings as a sign of reprobation.

A little before 1620 Nehemiah entered into business on his own account as a turner, and took a house in Little Eastcheap, between Pudding Lane and Fish-street Hill. There he passed the remainder of an uneventful life. In 1639 he and his brother John were summoned before the court of Star-chamber on the charge of possessing prohibited books. He acknowledged that he had possessed William Prynne's Divine Tragedie, Matthew White's Newes from Ipswich, and Henry Burton's Apology of an Appeale, but pleaded that he no longer owned them. He was kept under surveillance by the court for about two years, but suffered no further penalty.

In 1619 or 1620 he was married to Grace, sister of Zachariah and Livewell Rampain (Rampaigne). Zachariah was killed in Ireland on a plantation in 1641. Livewell was minister at Burton, near Lincoln, and afterwards at Broxholme. By her Wallington had several children, of whom only a daughter, Sara, survived him. She was married to a puritan, named John Haughton, on 20 November 1641. Wallington died in the summer or autumn of 1658.

== Works ==
Wallington left three compilations of contemporary events.

1. In 1630 he commenced his Historical Notes and Meditations, 1583–1649. It consists of classified extracts from contemporary journals and pamphlets, which he enlarged with hearsay knowledge and enriched with pious reflections. The work is chiefly occupied with political affairs. The latest event recorded is the execution of Charles I.
2. In December 1630 he commenced a record of his private affairs, under the title Wallington's Journals, in a quarto volume. It was formerly in the possession of William Upcott, who indexed its contents.
3. In 1632 he commenced a third quarto, in which be recorded numerous strange portents which had occurred in various parts of England, taking notice of "Gods iudgments upon Sabbath breakers and on Drunkards." It contains many extracts from his Historical Notes.

Wallington's Historical Notes were published in 1869 (London, 2 vols. 8vo) under the editorship of Miss R. Webb, with the title Historical Notices of Events occurring chiefly in the Reign of Charles I.
