= Madness in Valencia =

Play written by Lope de Vega

Madness in Valencia ("Los Locos de Valencia") is a farce from the Spanish Golden Age by Félix Lope de Vega y Carpio. The play is one of Lope de Vega's earliest, dating from between 1590 and 1595 and tells the story of two lovers who, one fleeing from the Spanish army and the other from an oppressive father, feign insanity and seek refuge in the asylum of Valencia.

== Plot ==
Floriano accidentally kills Prince Reinero in a duel and is forced to flee to Valencia. To save him, his best friend Valerio disguises him as a philosopher named Beltran (Spanish: Beltrán), gone mad from a blend of love and too much studying. Floriano/Beltran is committed to the famed Valencian asylum.

Erifila has escaped her over-bearing father and an abhorred arranged marriage by convincing her servant, Leonato, that she is in love with him and wants to elope. Leonato, convinced that she does not love him, robs and strips her and abandons her on the outskirts of Valencia where she is discovered by Dr Pisano. Erifila is diagnosed as insane by the doctor and carted off to the asylum along with Floriano.

Floriano is discovered in the asylum first by Laida, the asylum wash-woman and then by Fedra, the administrator’s niece. Both promptly fall in love with Floriano and compete with each other for his affection. However, Floriano and Erifila have also met and there is an instant attraction. Both are wary, believing the other to be mad, but they fall ‘madly in love’. Valerio confesses to Floriano that he too has fallen in love/lust with Erifila.

An army officer arrives at the asylum in pursuit of the prince’s murderer armed with a portrait. Floriano and Erifila join forces to seize the portrait and put the officer off the scent.

Laida pretends to be mad in order to seduce Floriano. Fedra, upon hearing she is to be married to a suitor chosen by her father, and sent away from the asylum, follows suit. Dr Pisano prescribes a faked marriage to calm Fedra’s mad ravings. The pretend wedding is duly planned. Erifila finds out about the wedding, confronts Floriano in a jealous rage and vows she will be revenged despite his protestations that the marriage is a stunt to ‘cure’ Fedra. Valerio returns to the asylum, pretending to be one of Erifila’s relatives in order to take her home with him. She plays along to spite Floriano.

A gentleman arrives in Valencia, meets Pisano and the inmates at the asylum and is invited to witness the fake wedding. However, the wedding is interrupted by Erifila, fleeing Valerio. She declares love for Floriano, but he pretends to have actually married Fedra. Erifila immediately gets her revenge by outing Floriano as Prince Reinero’s murderer. Floriano is arrested.

But the gentleman has a few surprises up his sleeve allowing a delightful conclusion as Floriano is reunited with Erifila, Valerio is matched with Fedra and the couples leave the asylum to be married.

== Notable productions ==
Recent productions include the Royal Shakespeare Company in 2001 (dir. Jonathan Munby) and the Gate Theatre in 1992 (dir Laurence Boswell).

== Characters ==
=== Major characters ===
- Floriano. Pretends to be mad to escape punishment for killing a prince.
- Erifila (Spanish: Erífila). The daughter of a well-to-do family whose father wants to marry her off, Erifila escapes his authority by running away with a servant, who then robs her. The hospital staff find her naked in the streets and commit her, believing that she is mad.
- Valerio
- Prince Reinero
- Leonato
- Fedra and Laida

=== Minor characters ===
Martin and Belardo, Calandrio, Verino, Pisano, Tomas, Mordacho, Gerardo and Liberto
