= Lope de Vega =

Spanish playwright and poet (1562–1635)

Lope de Vega KOM
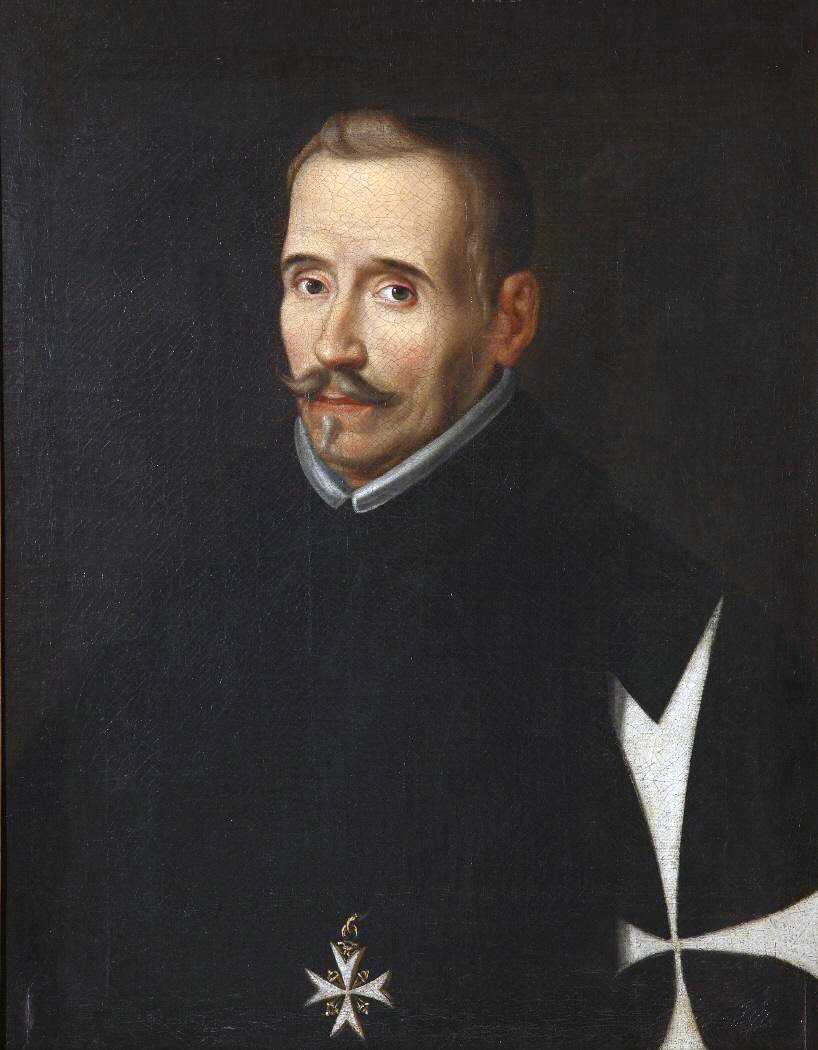
- Portrait by Eugenio Caxés (c. 1627)
- Born: Félix Lope de Vega y Carpio; 25 November 1562; Madrid, Castile
- Died: 27 August 1635 (aged 72); Madrid, Castile
- Resting place: St Sebastian's Church, Madrid
- Occupations: Poet, playwright, novelist
- Children: 15
- Writing career
- Language: Spanish
- Notable works: Fuenteovejuna; The Dog in the Manger; Punishment Without Revenge; The Knight from Olmedo
- Movement: Baroque

Signature
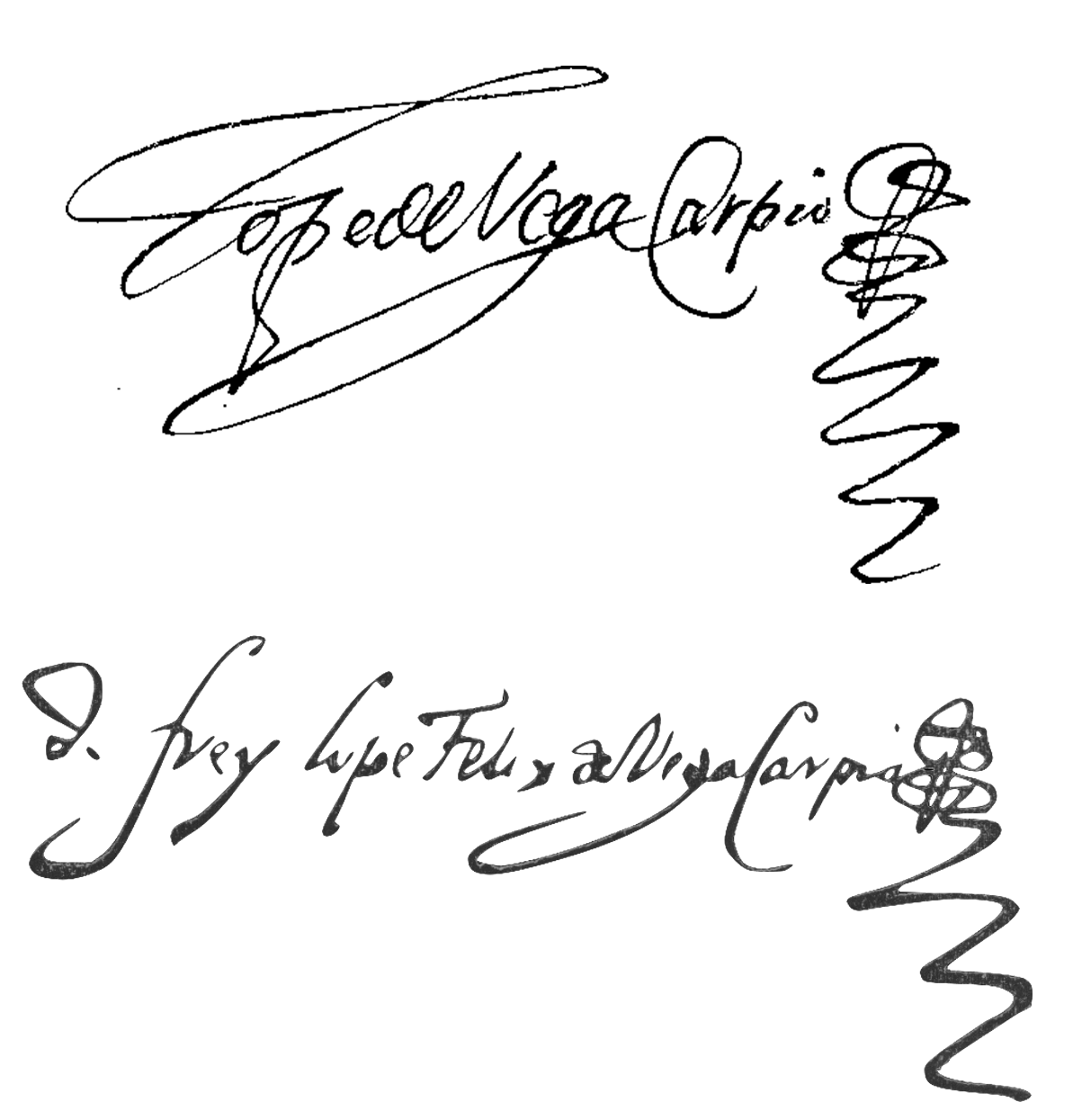

Félix Lope de Vega y Carpio (/dəˈveɪɡə/; Spanish: [ˈlope ðe ˈβeɣa]; 25 November 1562 – 27 August 1635) was a Spanish playwright, poet, and novelist who was a key figure in the Spanish Golden Age (1492–1659) of Baroque literature. In the literature of Spain, Lope de Vega is often considered second only to Miguel de Cervantes. Cervantes said that Lope de Vega was “The Phoenix of Wits” (Fénix de los ingenios) and “Monster of Nature” (Monstruo de naturaleza).

Lope de Vega renewed the literary life of Spanish theatre when it became mass culture, and with the playwrights Pedro Calderón de la Barca and Tirso de Molina defined the characteristics of Spanish Baroque theatre with great insight into the human condition. The literary production of Lope de Vega includes 3,000 sonnets, three novels, four novellas, nine epic poems, and approximately 500 stageplays.

Personally and professionally, Lope de Vega was friend to the writer Francisco de Quevedo and arch-enemy of the dramatist Juan Ruiz de Alarcón. The volume of literary works produced by Lope de Vega earned him the envy of his contemporaries, such as Cervantes and Luis de Góngora, and the admiration of Johann Wolfgang von Goethe for such a vast and colourful oeuvre. Lope de Vega was also a close friend of Sebastian Francisco de Medrano, founder and president of the Medrano Academy (Poetic Academy of Madrid). He would attend Medrano's Academy from 1616 to 1622, and his relationship with Medrano is evident in his El Laurel de Apolo (1630) in silva VII.

== Life ==
=== Youth ===
Lope de Vega Carpio was born November 1562 in Madrid, in the Puerta de Guadalajara to a family of natives of the valley of Carriedo. His father, Félix de Vega, was an embroiderer. Little is known of his mother, Francisca Fernández Flores. He later took the distinguished surname of Carpio from his paternal grandmother, Catalina del Carpio.

After a brief stay in Valladolid, his father moved to Madrid in 1561, perhaps drawn by the possibilities of the new capital city. However, Lope de Vega would later affirm that his father arrived in Madrid through a love affair from which his future mother was to rescue him. Thus the writer became the fruit of this reconciliation and owed his existence to the same jealousies he would later analyze so much in his dramatic works.

The first indications of young Lope's genius became apparent in his earliest years. His friend and biographer Pérez de Montalbán stated that at the age of five he was already reading Spanish and Latin. While he was still unable to write, he would share his breakfast with the older boys in exchange for their help scribing his verses. By his tenth birthday, he was translating Latin verse. He wrote his first play when he was 12, allegedly El verdadero amante, as he would later affirm in his dedication of the work to his son Lope, although these statements are most probably exaggerations.

His great talent bore him to the school of poet and musician Vicente Espinel in Madrid, to whom he later always referred with veneration. In his fourteenth year he continued his studies in the Colegio Imperial, a Jesuit school in Madrid, from which he absconded to take part in a military expedition in Portugal. Following that escapade, he had the good fortune of being taken into the protection of the Bishop of Ávila, who recognized the lad's talent and saw him enrolled in the University of Alcalá. Following graduation, Lope had planned to follow in his patron's footsteps and join the priesthood, but those plans were dashed by falling in love and realizing that celibacy was not for him. Thus he failed to attain a bachelor's degree and made what living he could as a secretary to aristocrats or by writing plays.

In 1583 Lope enlisted in the Spanish Navy and saw action at the Battle of Ponta Delgada in the Azores, under the command of his future friend Álvaro de Bazán, 1st Marquis of Santa Cruz, to whose son he would later dedicate a play.

Following this, he returned to Madrid and began his career as a playwright in earnest. He also began a love affair with Elena Osorio (the "Filis" of his poems), who was separated from her husband, actor Cristóbal Calderón, and was the daughter of a leading theater director. When, after some five years of this torrid affair, Elena spurned Lope in favor of another suitor, his vitriolic attacks on her and her family landed him in jail for libel and, ultimately, earned him the punishment of eight years' banishment from the court and two years' exile from Castile.

=== Exile ===
After libelling members of his family in his writing, Lope de Vega undauntedly went into exile. He took with him 16-year-old Isabel de Alderete y Urbina, known in his poems by the anagram "Belisa," the daughter of Philip II's court painter, Diego de Urbina. The two married under pressure from her family on 10 May 1588.

Just a few weeks later, on 29 May, Lope signed up for another tour of duty with the Spanish Navy: this was the summer of 1588, and the Armada was about to sail against England. It is likely that his military enlistment was the condition required by Isabel's family, eager to be rid of such an ill presentable son-in-law, to forgive him for carrying her away.

Lope's luck again served him well, however, and his ship, the San Juan, was one of the vessels to make it home to Spanish harbors in the aftermath of that failed expedition. Back in Spain by December 1588, he settled in the city of Valencia. There he lived with Isabel de Urbina and continued perfecting his dramatic formula participating regularly in the tertulia known as the Academia de los nocturnos, in the company of such accomplished dramatists as the canon Francisco Agustín Tárrega, the secretary to the Duke of Gandía Gaspar de Aguilar, Guillén de Castro, Carlos Boyl, and Ricardo de Turia. With them he refined his approach to theatrical writing by violating the unity of action and weaving two plots together in a single play, a technique known as imbroglio.

In 1590, at the end of his two years' exile from the realm, he moved to Toledo to serve Francisco de Ribera Barroso, who later became the 2nd Marquis of Malpica, and, some time later, Antonio Álvarez de Toledo, 5th Duke of Alba. In this later appointment he became gentleman of the bedchamber to the ducal court of the House of Alba, where he lived from 1592 to 1595. Here he read the work of Juan del Encina, from whom he improved the character of the donaire, perfecting still further his dramatic formula. In the fall of 1594, Isabel de Urbina died of postpartum complications. It was around this time that Lope wrote his pastoral novel La Arcadia, which included many poems and was based on the Duke's household in Alba de Tormes.

=== Return to Castile ===
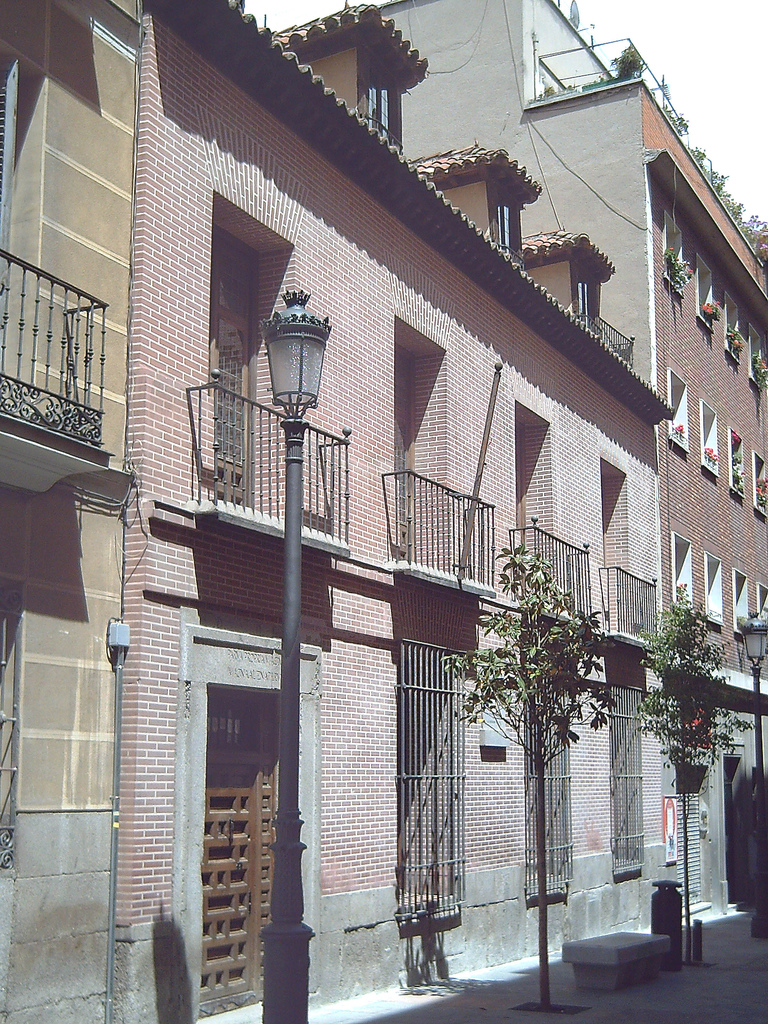
Lope's house in Madrid (1610–1635).

In 1595, following Isabel's death in childbirth, he left the Duke's service and – eight years having passed – returned to Madrid. There were other love affairs and other scandals: Antonia Trillo de Armenta, who earned him another lawsuit, and Micaela de Luján, an illiterate but beautiful actress, who inspired a rich series of sonnets, rewarded him with four children and was his lover until around 1608. In 1598, he married Juana de Guardo, the daughter of a wealthy butcher. Nevertheless, his trysts with others – including Micaela – continued.

In the 17th century Lope's literary output reached its peak. From 1607 he was also employed as a secretary, but not without various additional duties, by the Duke of Sessa. Once that decade was over, however, his personal situation took a turn for the worse. His favorite son, Carlos Félix (by Juana), died and, in 1612, Juana herself died in childbirth. After the heartbreaking loss of his son and wife, Lope summoned his remaining children still alive under the same roof to devote himself to Christianity. His writing in the early 1610s also assumed heavier religious influences and, in 1614, he joined the priesthood. The taking of holy orders did not, however, impede his romantic dalliances; what is more, he supplied his employer the duke with various female companions. The most notable and lasting of Lope's relationships was with Marta de Nevares, who met him in 1616 and would remain with him until her death in 1632.

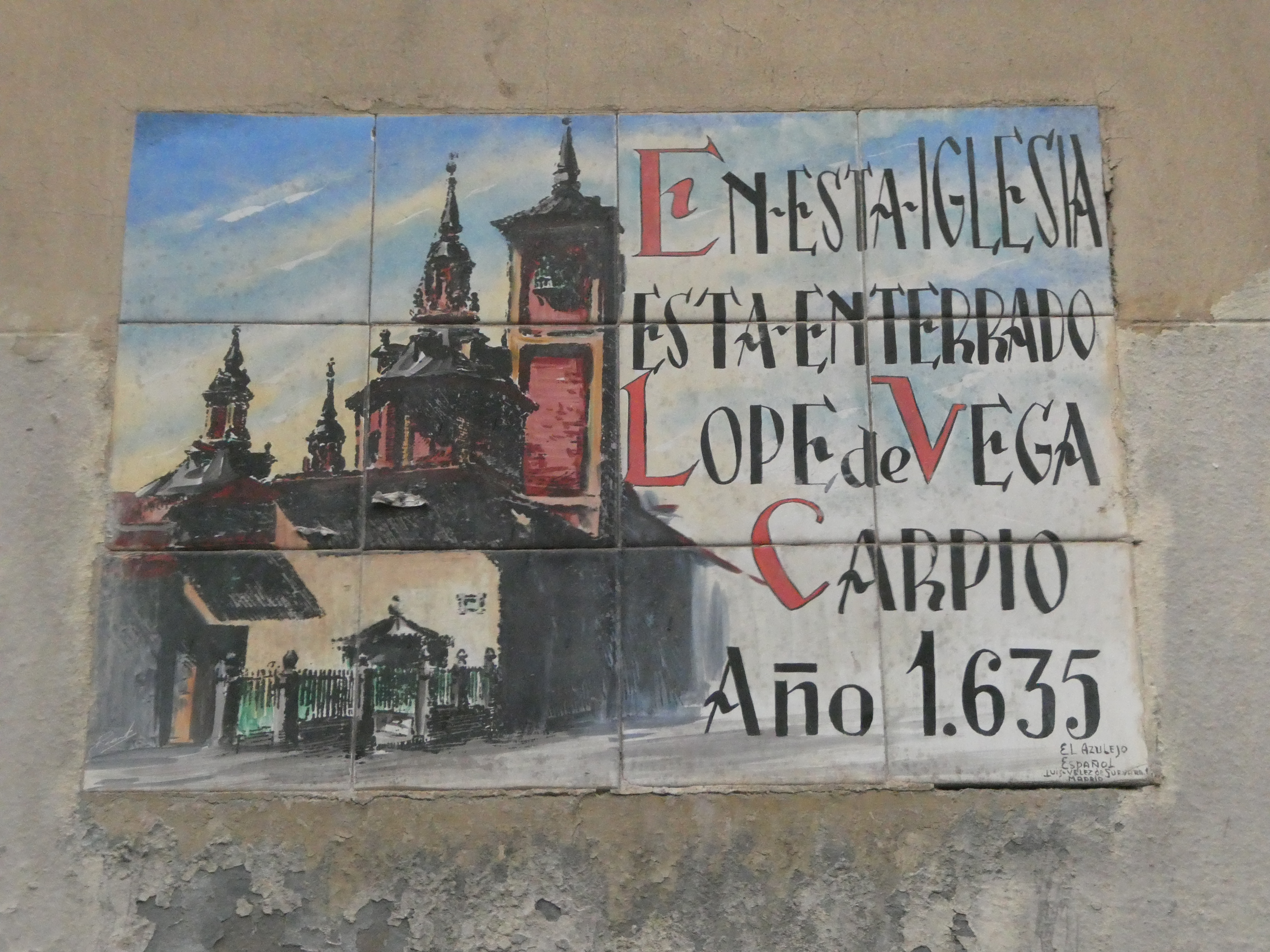
Sign at St Sebastian's Church, Madrid marking de Vega's burial

Further tragedies followed in 1635 with the loss of Lope, his son by Micaela and a worthy poet in his own right, in a shipwreck off the coast of Venezuela, and the abduction and subsequent abandonment of his beloved youngest daughter Antonia. Lope de Vega took to his bed and died of scarlet fever, in Madrid, on 27 August of that year. He was buried in St Sebastian's Church, Madrid.

=== Priesthood ===
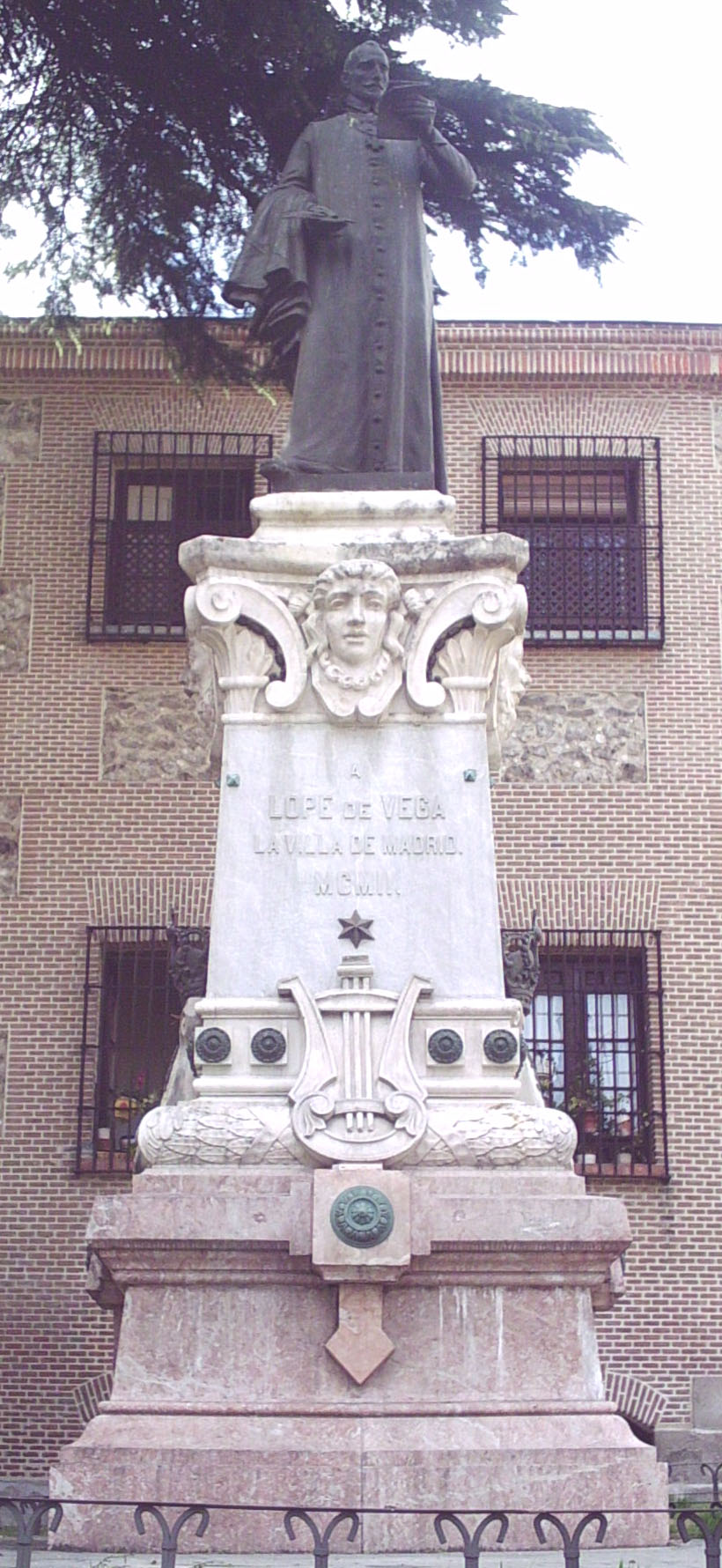
Lope de Vega dressed in cassock. (Madrid, 1902).

The period of life that characterizes priestly ordination of Lope de Vega was one of profound existential crisis, perhaps impelled by the death of close relatives. To this inspiration respond his Sacred Rhymes and the numerous devout works he began to compose, as well as the meditative and philosophical tone that appears in his last verses. On the night of 19 December 1611 the writer was the victim of an assassination attempt from which he could barely escape. Juana de Guardo suffered frequent illnesses and in 1612 Carlos Félix died of fevers. On 13 August the following year Juana de Guardo died while giving birth to Feliciana. So many misfortunes affected Lope emotionally, and on 24 May 1614 he finally decided to be ordained a priest.

The literary expression of this crisis and its repentances are the Sacred Rhymes, published in 1614; there it says: "If the body wants to be earth on earth / the soul wants to be heaven in heaven", unredeemed dualism that constitutes all its essence. The Sacred Rhymes constitute a book at the same time introspective in the sonnets (he uses the technique of the spiritual exercises that he learned in his studies with the Jesuits) as devotee for the poems dedicated to diverse saints or inspired in the sacred iconography, then in full deployment thanks to the recommendations emanated from the Council of Trent.

In 1627 he was admitted as a knight of the Order of Malta. This was an enormous honour for him since he had always taken an interest in orders of chivalry. In 1603 he had published the play El valor de Malta (The Valour of Malta) about the maritime battles of the Order. In his portrait by Eugenio Caxés he wears the habit of the Order of Malta.

=== Relationship with Cervantes ===
The relationship between Miguel de Cervantes and Lope de Vega was characterized by literary rivalry, mutual criticism, and personal tensions during the Spanish Golden Age. Although Cervantes initially praised Lope's literary talent, the two writers became increasingly antagonistic as Lope rose to prominence as a playwright. In a letter dated 1604, Lope expressed contempt for the literary abilities of Cervantes and criticized the popularity of his works. Cervantes alluded to Lope de vega's dominance of the theatrical world in the prologue to his describing him as the Monster of Nature (monstruo de naturaleza) and acknowledging his great success in comedy. Modern scholars have examined the conflict in the context of the social hierarchies and professional rivalries of early modern Spain.

== Work ==
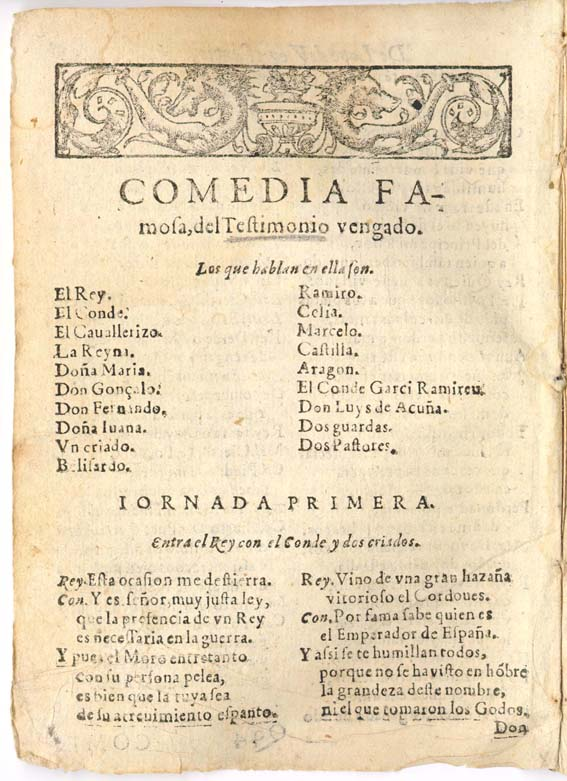
Title page of El testimonio vengado.

Lope's non-dramatic works were collected and published in Spain in the eighteenth century under the title Obras Sueltas (Madrid, 21 vols., 1776–79). The more important elements of this collection include the following:

- La Arcadia (1598), a pastoral romance;
- La Dragontea (1598), an epic poem of Sir Francis Drake's last expedition and death;
- El Isidro (1599), a poetic narrative of the life of Saint Isidore, future patron saint of Madrid, composed in octosyllabic quintillas;
- La Hermosura de Angélica (1602), an epic poem in three books, is a quasi sequel to Ariosto's Orlando Furioso.

Lope de Vega was one of the greatest Spanish poets of his time, along with Luis de Góngora and Francisco de Quevedo. His poems of Moorish and pastoral themes were extremely popular in the 1580s and 1590s, and in these, he portrayed elements of his own love affairs (appearing as a moor called Zaide or a shepherd called Belardo). In 1602 he published two hundred sonnets in the collection La Hermosura de Angélica and in 1604 he republished them with new material in Rimas. In 1614, his religious sonnets appeared in a book entitled Rimas sacras, which was another bestseller. In 1634, in a third book with similar title, Rimas humanas y divinas del licenciado Tomé de Burguillos, which has been considered his poetic masterpiece and the most modern book of 17th-century poetry, Lope created a heteronym, he concludes the identity of Tome de Burguillos, who has a deep and intimate romantic connection with a maid named Juana. This is a direct comparison and clash with Lope's skeptical outlook on society.

=== Background ===
Lope was the playwright who established in Spanish drama the three-act comedia as the definitive form, ignoring the precepts of the prevailing school of his contemporaries. In Arte nuevo de hacer comedias en este tiempo (1609), which was his artistic manifesto and the justification of his style which broke the neoclassical three unities of place, time and action, he showed that he knew the established rules of poetry but refused to follow them on the grounds that the "vulgar" Spaniard cared nothing about them: "Let us then speak to him in the language of fools, since it is he who pays us" are famous lines from his manifesto.

Lope boasted that he was a Spaniard pur sang (pure-blooded), maintaining that a writer's business is to write so as to make himself understood, and took the position of a defender of the language of ordinary life.

Lope's literary influence was chiefly Latin-Italian and, while he defended the tradition of the nation and the simplicity of the old Castilian, he emphasized his university education and the difference between those educated in the classics and the layman.

The majority of his works were written in haste and to order. Lope confessed that "more than a hundred of my comedies have taken only twenty-four hours to pass from the Muses to the boards of the theatre." His biographer Pérez de Montalbán tells how in Toledo, Lope composed fifteen acts in as many days – five comedies in two weeks.

In spite of some discrepancies in the figures, Lope's own records indicate that by 1604 he had composed 230 three-act plays (comedias). The figure had risen to 483 by 1609, to 800 by 1618, to 1000 by 1620, and to 1500 by 1632. Montalbán, in his Fama Póstuma (1636) set down the total of Lope's dramatic productions at 1800 comedias and more than 400 shorter sacramental plays. Of these, 637 plays are known by their titles, but only about 450 are extant. Many of these pieces were printed during Lope's lifetime, mostly by the playwright himself in the shape of twelve-play volumes, but also by booksellers who surreptitiously bought manuscripts from the actors who performed them. It is said that sometimes he wrote an entire play before breakfast.

=== Themes and sources ===
The classification of this large mass of dramatic literature is a task of great difficulty. The terms traditionally employed – comedy, tragedy, and the like – are difficult to apply to Lope's oeuvre and another approach to categorization has been suggested. Lope's work essentially belongs to the drama of intrigue, the plot determining everything else. Lope used history, especially Spanish history, as his main source of subject matter. There were few national and patriotic subjects, from the reign of King Pelayo to the history of his own age, that he did not put upon the stage. Nevertheless, Lope's most celebrated plays belong to the category called capa y espada ("cloak and dagger"), where the plots are chiefly love intrigues along with affairs of honor, most commonly involving the petty nobility of medieval Spain.

Among the best-known works of this class are El perro del hortelano (The Dog in the Manger), El castigo sin venganza (Punishment without Revenge), and El maestro de danzar (The Dance Teacher).

In some of these, Lope strives to set forth some moral maxim and to illustrate its abuse with a living example. On the theme that poverty is no crime, in the play Las Flores de Don Juan, he uses the history of two brothers to illustrate the triumph of virtuous poverty over opulent vice, while indirectly attacking the institution of primogeniture, which often places in the hands of an unworthy person the honor and substance of a family when younger members would be better qualified for the trust. However, such morality pieces are rare in Lope's repertory; generally, his aim is to amuse and stir with his focus being on the plot, not concerning himself with instruction.

In El villano en su rincón, described as a romantic comedy, Francis I of France ends up spending the night in a woodcutter's hut, after becoming lost during a hunt, resulting in a confrontation between peasant-philosopher and king. The peasant's refusal to even look upon the king's magnificence, grand and dramatic compared with the humble rincón, is rebuked by a gentleman of the king's court: "a king of such might/that the Scythian and fierce Turk/tremble before his golden fleurs de lis!"

== Legacy ==
Lope encountered a poorly organized dramatic tradition; plays were sometimes composed in four acts, sometimes in three, and though they were written in verse, the structure of the versification was left to the individual writer. Because the Spanish public liked it, he adopted the style of drama which was then in vogue. He enlarged its narrow framework to a great degree, introducing a wide range of material for dramatic situations – the Bible, ancient mythology, the lives of the saints, ancient history, Spanish history, the legends of the Middle Ages, the writings of the Italian novelists, current events, and everyday Spanish life in the 17th century. Prior to Lope, playwrights sketched the conditions of persons and their characters superficially. With fuller observation and more careful description, Lope de Vega depicted real character types with language and accouterments appropriate to their position in society. The old comedy was awkward and poor in its versification. Lope introduced order into all the forms of national poetry, from the old romance couplets to the lyrical combinations borrowed from Italy. He wrote that those who should come after him had only to go on along the path which he had opened.

Lope de Vega encountered other poets who were unimpressed with his discoveries and attempted to defame his writing. The Spanish poet Pedro de Torres Rámila wrote his thoughts on Lope in his Latin satire Spongia (Paris, 1617). Torres wrote personal attacks on Lope's sacramental plays and sought to scandalize his name and reputation. This attempt backfired on Torres due to the overwhelmingly negative responses his Spongia received from the public after its release. Scholars and poets alike came to the defense of Lope de Vega and wrote many counterclaims against the Spongia directed at Torres himself, like Juan Rodríguez de Fonseca's Exposulatio Spongiae.

A municipality in Northern Samar in the Philippines was named after de Vega, created in 1980 from the 22 barangays of Catarmán. A street in the Santa Cruz district of the City of Manila, Philippines is also named after the playwright. In 2017, Google celebrated his 455th birthday with a Google Doodle.

=== In fiction ===
In Harry Turtledove's alternate history novel Ruled Britannia (2002), in which the Spanish Armada was successful, Vega is depicted as a Spanish soldier-playwright on occupation duty in defeated England, who interacts with William Shakespeare. The novel's viewpoint narration alternates between the two playwrights.

In the 2010 Spanish-language film Lope, he is played by Alberto Ammann.

Vega is played by Víctor Clavijo in the Spanish TV series El Ministerio del Tiempo. In his first appearance he played Vega in 1588, on the eve of the Spanish Armada, while the second episode depicted Vega in 1604.

== List of works ==
=== Plays ===
Listed here are some of the better-known of de Vega's plays:

- El maestro de danzar (1594) (The Dancing Master)
- Los locos de Valencia (Madness in Valencia)
- El acero de Madrid (The Steel of Madrid)
- El perro del Hortelano (The Gardener's Dog, a variation of The Dog in the Manger fable)
- La viuda valenciana (The Widow from Valencia)
- Peribáñez y el comendador de Ocaña
- Fuenteovejuna
- El anzuelo de Fenisa (Fenisa's Hook)
- El cordobés valeroso Pedro Carbonero
- Mujeres y criados (Women and Servants)
- El mejor alcalde, el Rey (The Best Mayor, The King)
- El Nuevo Mundo descubierto por Cristóbal Colón (The New World Discovered by Christopher Columbus)
- El caballero de Olmedo (The Knight from Olmedo)
- La dama boba (The Stupid Lady; The Lady-Fool)
- El amor enamorado
- El castigo sin venganza (Punishment Without Revenge)
- Las bizarrías de Belisa
- El mayordomo de la duquesa de Amalfi (The Duchess of Amalfi's Steward)
- Lo Fingido Verdadero (What you Pretend Has Become Real)
- El niño inocente de La Guardia (The Innocent Child of La Guardia)
- La fe rompida
- El Honrado Hermano (The Honourable Brother, based in the Classic story of the Horatii and Curiatii)

In January 2023, an anonymous work in the collection of the National Library of Spain, La francesa Laura (The Frenchwoman Laura), was identified with the help of artificial intelligence as another comedy by Lope de Vega. The comedy was classified as a late work of Lope de Vega and dated from 1628 to 1630, as its flattering treatment of France could be attributed to the momentary good relationship between Spain and France during the Thirty Years' War, having England as a common enemy. Later investigations by literary historians confirmed the findings of artificial intelligence.

=== Opera ===
- La selva sin amor (18 December 1627) (The Lovelorn Forest), the first Spanish opera, with music by Alessandro Piccinini.

=== Epic poems and lyrical poetry ===
- La Dragontea (1598) ("Drake the Pirate")
- El Isidro (1599) ("Isidro")
- La hermosura de Angélica (1602) ("The Beauty of Angelica")
- Rimas (1602) ("Rhymes")
- Arte nuevo de hacer comedias (1609)
- Jerusalén conquistada (1609)
- Rimas sacras (1614)
- La Filomena (1621)
- La Circe (1624)
- El laurel de Apolo (1630)
- La Gatomaquia (1634)
- Rimas humanas y divinas del licenciado Tomé de Burguillos (1634)

=== Prose fiction ===
- Arcadia (published 1598) (The Arcadia), pastoral romance in prose, interspersed with verse
- El peregrino en su patria (published 1604) (The Pilgrim in his Homeland) - a Byzantine novel translated as The pilgrime of Casteele, London: Printed by E. Allde for John Norton (1621)
- Pastores de Belen: prosas y versos divinos (The Shepherds of Bethlehem: divine prose and verses) (published 1614)
- Novelas a Marcia Leonarda (Novels for Marcia Leonarda) - a collection of 4 short novellas:
1. Las fortunas de Diana (The Fortunes of Diana) (published in La Filomena 1621)
2. La desdicha por la honra (Misfortune for Honour) (1624)
3. La más prudente venganza (The Most Prudent Vengeance) (published 1624)
4. Guzmán el Bravo (Guzmán the Brave) (published in La Circe, 1624)
- La Dorotea (published 1632) - a Celestine novel in dialogues

== See also ==
- Alonso Fernández de Avellaneda

== Sources ==
- Calderón, Lope de Vega and (2019). Theatre Database. Retrieved from http://www.theatredatabase.com/17th_century/calderon_and_lope_de_vega.html
- Goldáraz, Luis H. (2018, November 30). Lope, el verso y la vida. Libertad Digital. Retrieved from https://www.libertaddigital.com/cultura/libros/2018-11-30/antonio-sanchez-jimenez-presenta-la-biografia-de-lope-de-vega-1276629134/
- Hayes, Francis C. (1967). Lope de Vega. Twayne's World Author Series. New York: Twayne Publishers.
- Hennigfeld, Ursula (2008). Der ruinierte Körper. Petrarkistische Sonette in transkultureller Perspektive. Würzburg: Königshausen & Neumann.
- Ray Keck, author of Love's Dialectic: Mimesis and Allegory in the Romances of Lope de Vega
- Samson, Alexander; Thacker, Jonathan (2018). A Companion to Lope de Vega (Paperback ed.). Tamesis. ISBN 978-1855663251. Archived from the original on 2 June 2020.
- Lope de Vega, Félix Arturo (2019). LibriVox. Retrieved from https://librivox.org/author/229?primary_key=229&search_category=author&search_page=1&search_form=get_results
- Lope de Vega, The Works of (2011). Spanish Books. Retrieved from https://www.classicspanishbooks.com/16th-cent-baroque-lope-works.html
- Lope Felix de (Carpio) Vega. (2011). Hutchinson’s Biography Database, 1.
- Morley, S., & Allardice, L. (2003). Double takes. New Statesman, 132(4639), 46.
- Vega Carpio, Félix Lope de (2019). Columbia Electronic Encyclopedia, 6th Edition, 1.
- Vega Carpio, Lope Felix de (2000). Theatre History. Retrieved from http://www.theatrehistory.com/spanish/lope001.html
- Vega, Lope de (2012). Britannica Biographies, 1.

In Spanish

- Alonso, Dámaso, En torno a Lope, Madrid, Gredos, 1972, 212 pp. ISBN 9788424904753
- Castro, Américo y Hugo A. Rennert, Vida de Lope de Vega: (1562-1635) ed. de Fernando Lázaro Carreter, Salamanca, 1968.
- De Salvo, Mimma, «Notas sobre Lope de Vega y Jerónima de Burgos: un estado de la cuestión», pub. en Homenaje a Luis Quirante. Cuadernos de Filología, anejo L, 2 vols., tomo I, 2002, págs. 141-156. Versión en línea revisada en 2008. URL. Consulta 28-09-2010.
- «Lengua y literatura, Historia de las literaturas», en Enciclopedia metódica Larousse, vol. III, Ciudad de México, Larousse, 1983, págs 99–100. ISBN 968-6042-14-8
- Huerta Calvo, Javier, Historia del Teatro Español, Madrid, Gredos, 2003.
- Menéndez Pelayo, Marcelino, Estudios sobre el teatro de Lope de Vega, Madrid, Editorial Artes Gráficas, 1949, 6 volúmenes.
- MONTESINOS, José Fernández, Estudios sobre Lope de Vega, Salamanca, Anaya, 1967.
- Pedraza Jiménez, Felipe B., El universo poético de Lope de Vega, Madrid, Laberinto, 2004.
  - —, Perfil biográfico, Barcelona, Teide, 1990, págs. 3-23.
- Rozas, Juan Manuel, Estudios sobre Lope de Vega, Madrid, Cátedra, 1990.
- Pedraza Jiménez, Felipe B., Lope de Vega: pasiones, obra y fortuna del monstruo de naturaleza, EDAF, Madrid, 2009 (ISBN 9788441421424).
- Arellano, Ignacio, Historia del teatro español del siglo XVII, Cátedra, Madrid, 1995 (ISBN 9788437613680).
- Arellano, Ignacio; Mata, Carlos; Vida y obra de Lope de Vega, Bibliotheca homolegens, Madrid, 2011 (ISBN 978-84-92518-72-2).
