= Cristóbal Oudrid =

Spanish pianist, conductor, and composer (1825–1877)

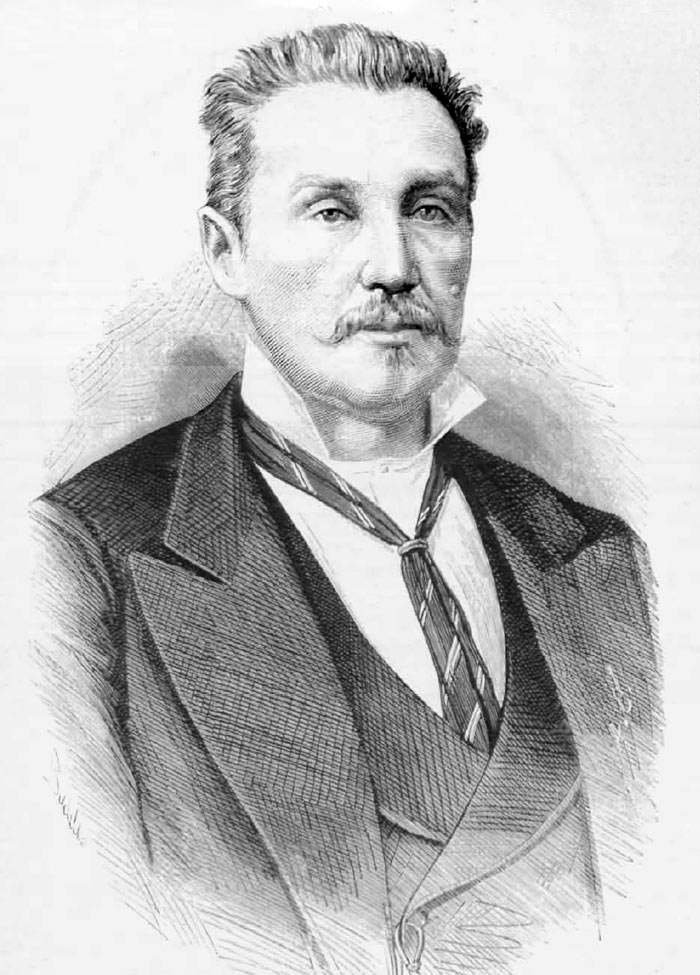
- Cristóbal Oudrid, 22 March 1877
- Born: Cristóbal Carlos Domingo Romualdo y Ricardo Oudrid y Segura; 7 February 1825; Badajoz, Spain
- Died: 13 March 1877 (aged 52); Madrid, Spain
- Spouse: Vicenta Munoz Vallejo
- Parent(s): Cristóbal Oudrid y Estarón, Antonia Segura González

Cristóbal (Carlos Domingo Romualdo y Ricardo) Oudrid y Segura (Spanish pronunciation: [kɾisˈtoβal owˈðɾið i seˈɣuɾa], 7 February 1825 – 13 March 1877) was a Spanish pianist, conductor, and composer. He is noted for his many contributions to the formation and development of the zarzuela genre in Spain during the second half of the 19th century. He was a gifted musician—but with little technical knowledge, which he bragged about to receive more credit from others with relation to his creations. This habit earned him the scathing criticism of people like Antonio Peña y Goñi who, nevertheless, praised the bright, sensual and cheerful ease with which Oudrid used to bring to life the true meaning of the Spanish song.

During a successful career of more than 25 years, Oudrid produced over a hundred works, many in association with other composers. His first musical presentation was the Andalusian zarzuela La Venta del Puerto o Juanillo El Contrabandista, premiered at Teatro del Príncipe in 1846. His second venture was La Pradera del Canal, a collaborative work with composers Luis de Cepeda Baranda and Sebastián Iradier, premiered at Teatro de la Cruz in 1847. As a founding father of Spanish musical nationalism, he was instrumental in bringing the zarzuela to a national status, in the company of other prominent artists such as Francisco Asenjo Barbieri, Joaquín Gaztambide, Rafael Hernando, José Inzenga, and baritone Francisco Salas, with whom he formed the Sociedad Artística Musical in 1851.

Oudrid was particularly prolific also as a bandmaster during the 1850s and early 1860s, having conducted the orchestra at Teatro Real, where renowned tenors such as Roberto Stagno (1840–1897) and Enrico Tamberlik (1820–1889) premiered, as well as the orchestra of Teatro de la Zarzuela. His last performance was the rehearsal of the opera Mignon by the French composer Ambroise Thomas.

== Early life ==
Cristóbal Oudrid was born in Badajoz on 7 February 1825. His grandfather was a Flemish military bandmaster and director of the National Militia's band stationed near the Portuguese border. His parents were Carlos Oudrid Estarón (1793–1843) and Antonia Segura González (1801–?).

His father taught him the rudimentary elements of music theory and the basic notions of Solfège, along with his first piano lessons. Despite his manifested precociousness, and even without knowing the most basic rules of harmony, he began arranging some of Haydn and Mozart's musical compositions for flute, clarion, and cornet, once he was already becoming familiar with some wind instruments such as the clarinet, horn, and oboe, which he learned to play on his own. But without a firm understanding of piano method or further training in composition, his technique became flawed, a problem that persisted throughout his career. Oudrid was then brought by his father to the attention of composer Baltasar Saldoni, then director of Teatro del Príncipe. Still very young, he was musical director of the Liceo de Badajoz.

After his father's death on 27 June 1843, Oudrid moved to Madrid the following year with Vicenta Munoz Vallejo, daughter of Jose Muñoz Santano and Pascuala Vallejo; they married in May 1855. His moving to Madrid was with the intention of succeeding as a musician and studying piano with Pedro Albéniz, as a recommendation of his music teacher Baltasar Saldoni, who asked his friends at the weekly magazine Semanario Pintoresco Español to help Oudrid make a living as a piano player at concerts and coffee shops. Another lucky break was a reference letter from Brigadier Juan Guillén Buzarán, director of the orchestra of Teatro Real, by whom he joined the Royal Orchestra as one of its clarinetists. Around this time, he became known as a successful pianist and arranger of operas, including in his musical programme his own compositions, songs and fantasias. His first song collections were published in 1845 and comprised Las Recreos de Artist, Colecion de Consciones y Melodias Espanolas, based on the poetry of Ramon Valladares y Saavedra, and instrumental music for piano such as Variaciones sobre el Hullabaloo de Jerez, Fantasía sobre los temas de "Maria de Rohan", and Hernani.

== Career ==
In 1847, Oudrid began working in the field of stage music as composer, presenting his Andalusian zarzuela La Venta del Puerto o Juanillo El Contrabandista, with lyrics by Mariano Fernandez. It premiered as a major success at Teatro del Príncipe in January of that year, soon placing him among Madrid's most favorite composers. La Pradera del Canal, his second successful work written in collaboration with Luis de Cepeda and Sebastián Iradier followed, premiering at Teatro de la Cruz in March of that year. In 1848, he organized with Rafael Hernando the premiere of El Ensayo de una Ópera, a zarzuela-parody based on the Italian operetta La Prova di una Ópera Seria by Giuseppe Mazza, on the rehearsal of an opera entitled Las Sacerdotisas del Sol o Los Españoles en el Otro Mundo, the success of which marked the beginning of a movement for re-establishment of the modern zarzuela, helping him lead the renewal of the genre. The importance of this work is that it was a major breakthrough in the musical context, leaving local themes behind and widening the expressive and artistic ambition of the Spanish theatrical scenario.

1849 gave rise to other successful works such as Misterios de Bastidores, La Paga de Navidad, and El Alma en Pena, with librettist Francisco de Paula Montemar. A year later, Hernando Rafael Palomar, Francisco Asenjo Barbieri and Joaquín Gaztambide Garbayo collaborated with him on Escenas de Chamberí, which premiered at Teatro Variedades, in Madrid, on 19 November. This work was somehow important for Oudrid in which it led to the founding of the Sociedad Artística Musical on 14 September 1851, together with composers Gaztambide, Hernando, Barbieri, Inzenga, the poet José de Olona and baritone Francisco Salas, with whom the profits would be divided in equal parts. For this purpose, they rent the Teatro del Circo under the assistance of Francisco de las Rivas, an important banker, and pledged to write three works per season, one in two acts and others in three or more. The crowning of this society came on the night of 6 October with the premiere of the three-act zarzuela Jugar con fuego by Francisco Asenjo Barbieri, with text provided by Domingo Ventura de la Vega.

In 1853, the baritone Salas, explained that the works composed by Barbieri and Gaztambide, the former with 17 acts and the latter with 14, had been the most successful in comparison to those of Inzenga, Oudrid and Hernando, with 2, 9 and 3 acts respectively, which had resulted in failure or moderate success. Also, the evidence that Hernando and Inzenga were unfairly profiting from the work of their colleagues, together with the economic pressure from a few singers, forced an apport of extra capital and the restructuring of the society, being that Oudrid, Inzenga and Hernando were then excluded from it for not having sufficient assets to take care of the required capital. This situation cause Oudrid much resentment once he had fulfilled his task with relative success, that is, 9 acts in total. However, Oudrid's musical activity would continue, and years later he would give to the world about fifty zarzuelas more, among which were the El Postillón de la Rioja (1856), based on Adolphe Adam's comic opera Le postillon de Lonjumeau, and El Molinero de Subiza (1870).

In 1860, he was appointed director of the orchestra of Teatro del Circo, where the one-act musical-scherzo El Amor por los Balcones, written in partnership with José Inzenga Castellanos, with text by Ramón de Navarete and Fernández Landa staged with great success. He later became director of Teatro de la Zarzuela, a familiar place where a variety of collaborative zarzuelas premiered such as Frasquito, by Manuel Fernández Caballero, with text by Ricardo de la Vega de Oreiro y Lema, and Juan Lombía's El sitio de Zaragoza en 1808, a staple of the wind band repertoire he composed incidental music for. In November 1867, he was working as choirmaster for the Compañia de Ópera Italiana established at Teatro Real, where he became music director from 1870.

Oudrid's three-act magnum opus, with text by Luis de Eguílaz, El molinero de Subiza, was presented at Teatro de la Zarzuela in 1870, which resulted in his switching over to the podium and the drama genre. His last work was Blancos y azules (1876), in association with Fernández Caballero. The 52-year-old Oudrid died unexpectedly of bacterial pneumonia at Teatro Real, in Madrid, on 13 March 1877, while preparing the performance of the opera Mignon by Ambroise Thomas. His death centennial was suggested to be commemorated with his musical El Molinero de Subiza.

== Works ==
In relation to the musical themes explored by Oudrid, one of his most famous work is La Rondalla Aragonesa, from his symphonic poem El Sitio de Zaragoza, which chronicles the confrontation of Napoleon's troops with the besieged citizens of Zaragoza, premiered at Teatro Principal on 19 November 1856. Another of his merited symphonic works is his Rondeña. In 1850, he wrote the one-act Revue A Última Hora with verses by José de Olona, and together with Luis y Vicente Arche (1815–1879), the two-act Revue 1866 y 1867 with verses by José María Gutiérrez de Alba, which premiered at Teatro del Circo, in Madrid, on the night of 24 December 1866.

Some of his successful zarzuela-arias are La Pajarita, for soprano and piano, La Macarena, for cello and acoustic guitar composed for the French mezzo-soprano Constance Nantier-Didiée, La Salerosa, written for Antonietta Pozzoni, and Soledad for Rosina Penco. Among his songs of patriotic or military character, those that stand out are La Marcha Triunfal de Africa, El Grito de Patria, and La Polka de Prim, being him also the author of the well-known Salve Marinera, adopted as the anthem of the Spanish Navy from 1870, with lyrics written by Luis de Eguilaz, later adapted by Mariano Méndez Vigo and officially regulated in 1941.

== Zarzuelas ==
| Year | Title | Acts | Co-writers | Librettists | Notes | Refs |
|---|---|---|---|---|---|---|
| 1847 | La Venta del Puerto o Juanillo el Contrabandista | 1 | Mariano Soriano Fuertes | Mariano Fernández | (Note: La Venta del Puerto o Juanillo el Contrabandista (The Grocery store at the Port or Juanillo the Smuggler) is Cristóbal Oudrid's first zarzuela for the theatre. Composed of seven musical numbers by Oudrid in a total of twelve, alternating duets and choruses with romanzas in ternary form, it was written almost entirely in Andalusian dialect by librettist Mariano Fernández Cipriano. Starring a smuggler, his girlfriend Curra, a former landlady, and Sergeant Verdugones, among pestles, smugglers and a students band, it was a box office success in its premiere at Teatro del Príncipe on the night of 16 January 1846.) | |
| 1847 | La Pradera del Canal | 1 | Sebastián Iradier, Luis de Cepeda Baranda | Agustin Azcona | (Note: La Pradera del Canal (The Prairie at the Canal) is a collaborative work among Oudrid, Sebastián Iradier Salaverri and Luis de Cepeda Baranda, director in charge of the symphonic part of this zarzuela with his Sinfonía Característica Española. Composed of four songs and text by Agustin Azcona, it premiered at Teatro de la Cruz, in Madrid, on the night of 4 March 1847.) | |
| 1847 | El Turrón de Nochebuena | 1 | — | Juan de Alba | (Note: El Turrón de Nochebuena (The Turrón of Christmas Eve) is a one-act zarzuela with lyrics by Juan de Alba about competing vendors of turrón and other typical Christmas' products at Plaza Mayor, in Madrid. It premiered at Teatro Variedades on the night of 24 December 1847 with good acclaim both by public and critics.) | |
| 1848 | El Ensayo de una Ópera | 1 | Rafael Hernando y Palomar | Juan del Peral | (Note: El Ensayo de una Ópera (The Rehearsal of an Opera) is a one-act zarzuela with verses by Juan del Peral. It premiered at Teatro del Instituto (Teatro de la Comedia) on the afternoon of 24 December 1848 with good acclaim.) | |
| 1848 | Los Pícaros Castigados o La Fiesta en el Cortijo | 1 | Ignacio Ovejero | Mariano Fernández | (Note: Los Pícaros Castigados o La Fiesta en el Cortijo (The Punished Scoundrels or The Party at the Tenements) is a short comic zarzuela in one act and prose, which premiered at Teatro del Príncipe on the afternoon of 24 December 1848 with a new song by Ignacio Ovejero.) | |
| 1849 | Misterios de Bastidores | 1 | — | Francisco de Paula Montemar | (Note: Misterios de Bastidores (Mysteries of the Green room) is a one-act zarzuela with libretto by Francisco de Paula Montemar y Moraleda. It premiered at Teatro del Instituto on the night of 15 March 1849 in benefit of its first actress Doña Carlota Gimenez.) | |
| 1849 | La Paga de Navidad | 1 | — | Francisco de Paula Montemar | (Note: La Paga de Navidad (Christmas' Thirteenth salary) premiered at Teatro del Instituto on 5 July 1849. The six musical numbers composed by Oudrid were sung by comic tenor Ysidoro Pastor and mezzo-soprano Hernández, with accompanying male voices of Guerrero, José Alverá, Dardelle and chorus.) | |
| 1849 | El Alma en Pena | 1 | — | Francisco de Paula Montemar | (Note: El Alma en Pena (Wight) is a one-act zarzuela set over Ramón Valladares y Saavedra's original libretto by Francisco de Paula Montemar. It premiered at Teatro del Instituto on 2 August 1849 with mild success. Only Oudrid's music averted disaster as described by critics of that time.) | |
| 1850 | Pero Grullo | 2 | — | José María de Larrea, Antonio Lozano | (Note: Pero Grullo (Peter Lies, name and surname) premiered at the remodeled Teatro Variedades on 14 November 1850. This new zarzuela in two acts by Oudrid ingeniously links the thematic of the comic drama to the Italian operatic form: two couples carry on with their hard-to-understand sentimental life. An old loving woman, an authoritative father, and a young rebel daughter in a plot full of intrigues and implausibilities sprinkled with the usual spices of the Bouffe genre. The title is an allusion to the bromide expression "verdad de perogrullo".) | |
| 1850 | Escenas de Chamberí | 1 | Rafael Hernando Palomar, Francisco Asenjo Barbieri, Joaquín Gaztambide y Garbayo | José de Olona | (Note: Escenas de Chamberí (Scenes from Chamberí) is a bailable comic-lyrical capriccio in one act that premiered at Teatro Variedades on 19 November 1850.) | |
| 1851 | Buenos Días, Señor Don Simón | 1 | Francisco Asenjo Barbieri, Joaquín Gaztambide y Garbayo, Rafael Hernando Palomar, José Inzenga | Luis de Olona | (Note: Buenos Días, Señor Don Simón (Good Morning Don Simon) is a zarzuela based on a French vaudeville. It premiered at Teatro del Circo on the night of "16 April 1851" with great success, so much that Oudrid was compelled to write a sequence entitled Buenos Noches, Señor Don Simón the following year. Every references, when one is found, dates this zarzuela premiering on 16 April 1852, but this is the date of premiere of its sequence, therefore, Oudrid could have never written this zarzuela after 1851.) | |
| 1851 | Un Embuste y una Boda | 2 | — | Luis Mariano de Larra | (Note: Un Embuste y una Boda (A Lie and a Wedding) is a comic-opera with songs by Tomás Genovés y Lapetra and text by Mariano José de Larra y Wetoret, which premiered at Teatro Lírico Español (Teatro del Circo) on 28 April 1851.) | |
| 1851 | Todo son Raptos | 1 | Francisco Asenjo Barbieri | Luis Mariano de Larra | (Note: Todo son Raptos (All are Kidnappings) is a one-act zarzuela with libretto by Luis Mariano de Larra. It premiered at Teatro del Circo on 28 May 1851.) | |
| 1851 | El Castillo Encantado | 3 | José Inzenga | Emilio Bravo y Romero | (Note: El Castillo Encantado (The Enchanted Castle) is a zarzuela translated from the original French by Emilio Bravo y Romero. It premiered at Teatro Real del Circo on 17 December 1851. The plot, which was not well received by public or critics, tells the story of a French captain who received orders to go to a haunted castle in the vicinity with papers that should be open at a given time in one of the rooms of the castle. The jester who gave him the contact details, told him that those who showed up there were welcome by an old lady who appeared to them in form of a lovely woman.) | |
| 1851 | Por Seguir a una Mujer | 2 | Francisco Asenjo Barbieri, José Inzenga, Joaquín Gaztambide y Garbayo, Rafael Hernando Palomar | Luis de Olona | (Note: Por Seguir a una Mujer (For Following a Woman) was the last play of the winter season. It is a musical-journey operetta in four scenes (similar to a two-act zarzuela) with 12 musical numbers. Adapted from the vaudeville Un monsieur qui suit les femmes by Luis de Olona, it premiered at Teatro Real del Circo on the afternoon of 24 December 1851. This zarzuela tells a story about two young men who plan to follow a couple heading for Manila with the intention of getting married. The first scene takes place at Puerta del Sol, the second at an parador in Málaga, the third inside a frigate in the Strait of Gibraltar, and the fourth in a Moor village on the coast of Morocco.) | |
| 1852 | Mateo y Matea | 4 | — | Rafael Maíquez | (Note: Mateo y Matea (Mateo and Matea) is a comic-opera in four acts and verse by Rafael Máiquez. It was staged with great success at Teatro Real del Circo, in Madrid, on the night of 12 February 1852. Its title is an allusion to the Hebrew name Matthew and its feminine form.) | |
| 1852 | Buenas Noches, Señor Don Simón | 1 | — | Luis de Olona | (Note: Buenas Noches, Señor Don Simón (Good Night, Don Simón) is a comic zarzuela with 6 musical numbers written by Oudrid. Based on Paul-Jean-Baptiste Poret de Morvan and Joseph-Philippe Simon's Bonsoir, Monsieur Pantalon!, it premiered at Teatro del Circo on the afternoon of 16 April 1852 with great acclaim.) | |
| 1852 | De Este Mundo al Otro | 2 | — | Luis de Olona | (Note: De Este Mundo al Otro (From This World to the Other) premiered with great success both by public and critics at Teatro del Circo on 13 May 1852 in benefit of writer Federico Bardán.) | |
| 1852 | Las Dos Venturas | 1 | Luis Vicente Arche | José Picón García | (Note: Las Dos Venturas (The Two Adventures) is a zarzuela written in collaboration with Luis Vicente Arche Bermejo with text by José Picón García. It premiered at Teatro del Príncipe on the afternoon of 24 December 1852.) | |
| 1852 | Salvador y Salvadora | 1 | Luis Vicente Arche | Antonio Auset | (Note: Salvador y Salvadora (Salvador and Salvadora) is a one-act zarzuela with libretto by Antonio García Auset. It premiered on the night of 24 December 1852 at Teatro del Príncipe. The title are male and female Spanish surnames alluding the figure of the Savior.) | |
| 1852 | Don Ruperto Culebrín | 1 | — | José de Olona, Luis de Olona | (Note: Don Ruperto Culebrín (Don Ruperto Culebrín) is a comic zarzuela in two acts with text by the librettist brothers José and Luis de Olona y Gaeta. It premiered at Teatro del Circo on the night of 24 December 1852 (Christmas Eve), directed by Francisco Asenjo Barbieri. Some sources attribute this zarzuela as a cooperation among Oudrid, Barbieri, and Gaztambide, but in one manuscript at Sociedad General de Autores y Editores (SGAE) there is an appendix of Valle de Andorra, by Gaztambide and Luis de Olona based on Halévy's opera Le val d'Andorre, which may be the origin of this misunderstanding.) | |
| 1852 | Jugar con Vino | 1 | — | — | (Note: Jugar con Vino (Playing with wine) is a bailable comic zarzuela in one act and verse premiered at Teatro del Príncipe on the night of 24 December 1852.) | |
| 1853 | El Violón del Diablo | 1 | — | Rafael García Santisteban | (Note: El Violón del Diablo (The Devil's Guitar) is a one-act zarzuela with libretto by Rafael García Santisteban. It premiered at Teatro del Circo on the night of 7 January 1853.) | |
| 1853 | El Alcalde de Tronchón | 1 | — | Calixto Boldún y Conde | (Note: El Alcalde de Tronchón (The Alcalde of Tronchón) is a one-act zarzuela that premiered on 28 May 1853 at Teatro Real del Circo, in Madrid, with moderate success.) | |
| 1853 | El Hijo de Familia o El Lancero Voluntario | 3 | Emilio Arrieta, Joaquín Gaztambide y Garbayo | Antonio García Gutiérrez, Luis de Olona | (Note: El Hijo de Familia o El Lancero Voluntario (The Family Son or The Volunteering Lancer) is a zarzuela in three acts adapted from Jean-François Bayard's Le fils de famille by Antonio García Gutiérrez, Adelardo López de Ayala e Luis de Olona. It premiered at Teatro del Circo on 24 December 1853.) | |
| 1854 | Un Dia de Reinado | 1 | Francisco Asenjo Barbieri, José Inzenga, Joaquín Gaztambide y Garbayo | García Gutiérrez, Luis de Olona | (Note: Un Dia de Reinado (A Day as King) is a one-act zarzuela based on the arrangement of a comic opera in three acts by Eugène Scribe and Daniel Auber entitled Une Reine d'un Jour with verses by García Gutiérrez and prose by José de Olona. The plot describes the last days of Oliver Cromwell's son and the efforts of the future king, later Carlos II of Spain, to regain the throne of England. Only a handful of people attended its premiere at Teatro del Circo on 11 February 1854.) | |
| 1854 | La Tertulia o Los Manolos de Madrid en 1808 | 1 | — | Antonio Ruiz | (Note: La Tertulia o los Manolos de Madrid en 1808 (The Tertulia or the Majos from Madrid in 1808) is a ballet in one act with seven musical numbers written expressly by Ballet Director Antonio Ruiz for his wife ballerina Concepción Ruiz. It was staged at Teatro de Variedades, in Madrid, on 19 December 1854 and re-enacted at Teatro Lope de Vega by ballerina Manuela Perea and by Concepción Ruiz herself at Teatro Principal on 30 July 1859.) | |
| 1854 | Moreto | 3 | — | Agustín Azcona | (Note: Moreto (Moreto) is a zarzuela in three acts with text by librettist Agustín Azcona about the life of Don Agustín Moreto y Cavana. The main scene of the play takes place in the Buen Retiro Palace, under the reign of Philip IV of Spain. Composed of thirteen musical numbers, it premiered on the night of 20 May 1854 at Teatro Real del Circo.) | |
| 1854 | Pablito o Segunda Parte de Don Simon | 1 | — | Luis de Olona | (Note: Pablito o Segunda Parte de Don Simon (Pablito or the Second Part of Don Simon) is a comic-lyrical play in one act with text by librettist Luis de Olona. It premiered on 24 December 1854 at Teatro del Circo.) | |
| 1854 | La Cola del Diablo | 2 | Martín Sánchez Allú, Francisco Asenjo Barbieri | Luis de Olona | (Note: La Cola del Diablo (The Devil's Tail) is a comic-lyrical zarzuela translated from the French by Luis de Olona. It premiered at Teatro del Circo on 24 December 1854 with good reception by the public and critics.) | |
| 1855 | Estebanillo Peralta | 3 | Joaquín Gaztambide y Garbayo | Ventura de la Vega | (Note: Estebanillo Peralta (Estebanillo Peralta) is a zarzuela translated from the French by Buenaventura José María de la Vega y Cárdenas. With 13 musical numbers by Gaztambide and Oudrid, it premiered at Teatro del Circo on 3 January 1855. Estebanillo is the diminutive form of the name Esteban, as in Steve, and the term Peralta (Etymology: Leggy, that which runs) refers to a naughty child, a brat, therefore, Stevie Naughty. Another source dates the premiere of this zarzuela on 5 January 1855.) | |
| 1855 | Amor y Misterio | 3 | — | Luis de Olona | (Note: Amor y Misterio (Love and Mystery) is a zarzuela translated from the French by José de Olona with the exception of the third act. It premiered at Teatro del Circo on 1 May 1855.) | |
| 1855 | Los Polvos de la Madre Celestina | 3 | — | Juan Eugenio Hartzenbusch | (Note: Los Polvos de la Madre Celestina (The Shadows of Heavenly Mother) is a comic opera in three acts adapted from Anicet-Bourgeoise and Ferdinand Laule's 1839 play Les pilules du Diable. It premiered at Teatro del Príncipe in November 1855. The scene of this play, with its prologue set in the seventeenth century Maese Nicodemus Chirinella's local pharmacy and final act in the surroundings of Huesca, figurative and familiarly alludes to the wonderful and miraculous way something is done, without the subject in question realizing or even believing in heavenly intervention.) | |
| 1855 | Alumbra a Este Caballero | 1 | — | José de Olona | (Note: Alumbra a Este Caballero (Enlighten This Knight) is a comic-lyrical zarzuela in one act arranged by José de Olona to the Spanish literary taste. It was not well received by the public or critics, and did not last long. It premiered at Teatro del Circo on the night of 1 December 1855.) | |
| 1856 | El Conde de Castralla | 3 | — | Adelardo López de Ayala y Herrera | (Note: El Conde de Castralla (The Count of Castralla), with libretto by Adelardo López de Ayala, premiered at Teatro del Circo on 20 February 1856. The title is a paranomasia of the words castration and land, as in Castralia (land of castration).) | |
| 1856 | El Postillón de La Rioja | 2 | — | Luis de Olona | (Note: El Postillón de La Rioja (The Postilion of La Rioja) premiered at Teatro de la Zarzuela on 7 June 1856. It is loosely based on the French comic-opera Le postillon de Lonjumeau by Adolphe de Leuven and Léon Lévy Brunswick, first staged at the Opéra-Comique de Paris on 13 October 1836.) | |
| 1856 | La Flor de la Serranía | 1 | — | José María Gutierrez de Alba | (Note: ''La Flor de la Serranía'' (The Flower of the Highlands) is a zarzuela in one act, six musical numbers and verses by José María Gutiérrez de Alba. It premiered at Teatro del Circo on 2 August 1856 with good acclaim.) | |
| 1856 | Un Viaje al Vapor | 3 | — | José de Olona | (Note: Un Viaje al Vapor (Journey on a Steamer) is a nonsense zarzuela with music in three rounds and verses by José de Olona. It premiered at Teatro del Circo on 24 December 1856.) | |
| 1857 | ¡Concha! | 1 | — | José de Olona, Pedro Niceto Sobrado y Goyri | (Note: ¡Concha! (Seashell!), is a bailable-lyric zarzuela in one act with verses by librettists José de Olona e Pedro Niceto Sobrado y Goyri. It premiered at Teatro del Circo on 15 June 1857. The title is also an allusion to the female sexual organ.) | |
| 1857 | El Hijo del Regimiento | 3 | — | Victoriano Tamayo y Baus | (Note: El Hijo del Regimiento (The Son of the Regiment) premiered at Teatro del Circo on 22 August 1857.) | |
| 1857 | Dalila | 3 | Luis de Cepeda Baranda, Martín Sánchez Allú | José Maria Díaz | (Note: Dalila (Dalilah), erroneously attributed to Oudrid (co-author), is a dramatic-comic opera in three acts and six scenes set over an original libretto by Octave Feuillet, translated to Spanish by José Maria Díaz. The subject of this play is not biblical, but develops in Paris between a tenor, a music composer and a coquette who escapes with the tenor, leaving her lover musician to die. Unhappy with the end given by Feuillet, Diaz wrote a sequel in six scenes entitled Carnioli, to be staged on 19 December 1857—giving the mischievous Dalila her well-deserved punishment. The audience applauded the moral lesson, but ruled in favor of Miguel de Cervantes who said that sequels are never good. It premiered at Teatro del Príncipe on the night of 24 October 1857.) | |
| 1858 | Don Sisenando | 1 | — | Juan de la Puerta Vizcaíno | (Note: Don Sisenando (Don Sisenand) is a one-act zarzuela written over a libretto by Juan de la Puerta Vizcaíno, staged for the first time at Teatro del Circo on 4 April 1858.) | |
| 1858 | La Pata de Cabra | 3 | — | Juan de Grimaldi | (Note: La Pata de Cabra (Padfoot) is a melo-mime-comedy opera of magic-mythological-burlesque quality in one act set a to libretto by Juan de Grimaldi. It premiered with great success at Teatro Apolo on 17 June 1858. The title refers to a type of disease that some believe can only be cured by healers.) | |
| 1858 | Beltrán, el Aventurero | 3 | — | Francisco Camprodón | (Note: Beltrán, el Aventurero (Beltrán, the Adventurer) is a zarzuela in three acts with text by Francisco Camprodón y Safont. With the absence of Olona as co-proprietor of the musical society they had founded, Salas gave up the society too and staged this play at Teatro de la Zarzuela on 1 September 1858 through his own enterprise.) | |
| 1858 | El Joven Virginio | 1 | — | Mariano Pina y Bohigas | (Note: El Joven Virginio (The Young Virginio) is a zarzuela in one act and verses by Mariano Pina y Bohigas. With the title alluding to the word "virgin", it was first performed at Teatro de la Zarzuela, in Madrid, on 30 November 1858.) | |
| 1859 | Es un Genio | 1 | — | — | (Note: Es un Genio (You're a Genius). The writer Vicente Lalama published in his 1867 Indice General por Orden Alfabetico, De Cuantas Obras Dramaticas y Liricas that this work premiered on 3 May 1859 (Teatro de la Zarzuela) under the title Un Disparate, which may be true once there is no information as for the librettist or related content of this zarzuela. Besides, one of the characters in the play (Pascual) makes use of the word genio twice, as in Sepa usted que soy un genio.) | |
| 1859 | ¡Un Disparate! | 1 | — | Ricardo Velasco Ayllón | (Note: ¡Un Disparate! (It's Nonsense!) is a comic-lyrical sainete in one act and verse adapted from the French by Ricardo Velasco Ayllón. It premiered on 14 May 1859 at Teatro de la Zarzuela.) | |
| 1859 | El Último Mono | 1 | — | Narciso Serra | (Note: El Último Mono (The Last Monkey), a short philosophical one-act comic-lyrical sainete with five musical numbers by Oudrid, written over a thought of Jean-Baptiste Alphonse Karr by Narciso Serra, premiered on 30 May 1859 at Teatro de la Zarzuela with good reception by the public.) | |
| 1859 | El Zuavo | 1 | — | Pedro Niceto de Sobrado y Goyri | (Note: El Zuavo (The Zouave) is a Basque lyrical-dramatic zarzuela in one act written over a libretto by Pedro Niceto Sobrado y Goyri. It tells the story of an Algerian infantry soldier serving in the French army. It premiered with applause at Teatro del Circo on the night of 28 June 1859.) | |
| 1859 | Enlace y Desenlace | 2 | — | Mariano Pina y Bohigas | (Note: Enlace y Desenlace (Matrimony and Separation) is a zarzuela in two acts adapted to the Spanish scene by Mariano Pina y Bohigas. First performed in Madrid at Teatro de la Zarzuela on 27 September 1859.) | |
| 1859 | Un Viaje Aerostático | 1 | Joaquín Gaztambide y Garbayo | Javier de Ramírez | (Note: Un Viaje Aerostático (An Aerostatic Journey) is a one-act zarzuela with verse by Javier de Ramírez, once Olona had left the musical society, premiered on 14 December 1859 at Teatro de la Zarzuela without being well received by the public.) | |
| 1860 | Nadie se Muere Hasta que Dios Quiere | 1 | — | Narciso Serra | (Note: Nadie se Muere Hasta que Dios Quiere (Nothing dies until God says so) is Narciso Terra's second zarzuela with Cristóbal Oudrid, having him also collaborated with Oudrid and Joaquín Gaztambide y Garbayo in 1860. It premiered at Teatro de la Zarzuela, also called "Jovellanos" once this theatre was located on this street, on 19 September 1860.) | |
| 1860 | Tetuán por España | 1 | Martín Sánchez Allú, Mariano Vázquez y Gómez; Joaquín Gaztambide y Garbayo, Javier Gaztambide y Zía | Mariano Pina y Domínguez | (Note: Tetuán por España (Tetuán for Spain) premiered at Teatro de la Zarzuela on the night of 8 February 1860 without favorable acclaim despite the circunstances, so much that after the double bass player Joaquín Gaztambide and his cousin violinist and orchestra director of Teatro de la Zarzuela Javier Gaztambide left the stage, the future of their society was put then at stake. This libretto remains as a manuscript, having never been published.) | |
| 1860 | Memorias d'un Estudiante | 3 | — | José Picón García | (Note: Memorias d'un Estudiante (Mémoires of a Student), a anecdotal zarzuela in three acts and 14 musical numbers, with libretto by José Picón García, premiered on 5 May 1860 at Teatro de la Zarzuela. It is probably the first zarzuela addressing a college theme to achieve success in the Madrilenian musical scene.) | |
| 1860 | Una Zambra de Gitanos | 1 | — | Francisco Camprodón, Ventura de la Vega | (Note: Una Zambra de Gitanos (A Zambra of Gypsies ) is a bailable zarzuela that premiered on 16 June 1860.) | |
| 1860 | Doña Mariquita | 1 | — | Carlos Frontaura y Vázquez | (Note: Doña Mariquita (Mrs. Mariquita) is a one-act zarzuela with libretto by Carlos Frontaura y Vázquez. It premiered at Teatro de la Zarzuela on 15 November 1860.) | |
| 1860 | A Rey Muerto | 1 | — | Luis Rivera | (Note: A Rey Muerto (To Kill a King) is a zarzuela in one act with libretto by Luis Rivera, which premiered at Teatro de la Zarzuela on 17 November 1860.) | |
| 1860 | El Gran Bandido | 2 | Manuel Fernández Caballero | Francisco Camprodón | (Note: El Gran Bandido (The Big Bandit) is a zarzuela in two acts arranged to the Spanish musical scene. it premiered at Teatro de la Zarzuela on 23 December 1860.) | |
| 1861 | Un Concierto Casero | 1 | — | José Picón García | (Note: Un Concierto Casero (A Homely Concerto) is a comic-lyrical sainete in one act and in verse premiered at Teatro de la Zarzuela ("Jovellanos") on 3 December 1861.) | |
| 1861 | Las Piernas Azules | 1 | Mariano Vázquez y Gómez | Ventura de la Vega | (Note: Las Piernas Azules (The Blue Legs) was with libretto by Domingo Ventura de la Vega. It premiered at Teatro de la Zarzuela on 9 February 1861.) | |
| 1861 | Anarquía Conyugal | 1 | Joaquín Gaztambide y Garbayo | José Picón García | (Note: Anarquía Conyugal (matrimonial Anarchy) was a collaborative work between Gaztambide, who provided songs for this play, and librettist José Octavio Picón García, who adapted this French work, which had been long abandoned, to the Spanish theatrical scenario. It premiered on 17 April 1861 at Teatro de la Zarzuela with great acclaim.) | |
| 1861 | El Caballo Blanco | 2 | Manuel Fernández Caballero | Carlos Frontaura y Vázquez | (Note: El Caballo Blanco (The White Castle) is a two-act zarzuela with text by Mariano Pina y Domínguez by Carlos Frontaura. Oudrid wrote the first two songs of this play and Caballero the others. It premiered with great acclaim at Teatro de la Zarzuela on 12 June 1861.) | |
| 1861 | Llegar y Besar el Santo | 1 | Manuel Fernández Caballero | Eduardo Inza | (Note: Llegar y Besar el Santo (To Get to Kiss the Saint) is a zarzuela translated from an original caricatured libretto by Eduardo Inza. It premiered at Teatro de la Zarzuela on 15 June 1861.) | |
| 1861 | Un Viaje Alrededor de mi Suegro | 3 | Mariano Vazquez y Gómez | Luis Rivera | (Note: Un Viaje Alrededor de mi Suegro (A Voyage Around my Father-in-law) is a zarzuela in three acts adapted from a French operetta. It premiered on the afternoon of 24 December 1861 (Christmas Eve) with great acclaim, although it did not last long.) | |
| 1862 | Roquelaure | 2 | Manuel Fernández Caballero, José Rogel Soriano | Cristóbal Oudrid | (Note: Roquelaure (Roquelaure) is a zarzuela translated from the French by Juan Belza Rivera. It premiered at Teatro de la Zarzuela on the night of 17 March 1862 (announced on the poster Roquelor). The libretto was not published.) | |
| 1862 | Por Sorpresa | 1 | Mariano Vázquez y Gómez, José Rogel Soriano | Juan Ruiz del Cerro | (Note: Por Sorpresa (By Surprise) a zarzuela with libretto by Ruiz del Cerro. It at Teatro de la Zarzuela, in Madrid, on the afternoon of 20 April 1862. It was not so well received by the public as its successor Equilibrios de Amor, both staged on the same day.) | |
| 1862 | Equilibrios de Amor | 1 | Manuel Fernández Caballero | Fernando Martínez Pedrosa | (Note: Equilibrios de Amor (The Balance of Love), translated from the French, premiered at Teatro de la Zarzuela on 20 April 1862.) | |
| 1862 | La Isla de San Balandrán | 1 | — | José Picón García | (Note: La Isla de San Balandrán (San Balandrán's Island) is a zarzuela in one act with lyrics by José Picón about the mythic island of San Balandrán, premiered at Teatro de la Zarzuela in benefit of the Cuerpo de Coros (Corps Choir) on the night of 12 June 1862.) | |
| 1862 | Juegos de Azar | 2 | Manuel Fernández Caballero | Mariano Pina y Domínguez | (Note: Juegos de Azar (Hazard Games), adapted to the Spanish taste in its translation from the French by Mariano Pina, it premiered at Teatro de la Zarzuela on 30 October 1862.) | |
| 1862 | El Galán Incógnito | 3 | — | Francisco Camprodón | (Note: El Galán Incógnito (The Incognito Leading Man), written in 14 days by Oudrid with libretto by Ricardo de la Vega, premiered at Teatro de la Zarzuela on 1 November 1862. The endeavour was a complete fiasco.) | |
| 1863 | Matilde y Malek-Adhel | 3 | Joaquín Gaztambide y Garbayo | Carlos Frontaura y Vázquez | (Note: Matilde y Malek-Adhel (Matilde and Malek Adhel), is a zarzuela in three acts with lyrics by Carlos Frontaura, and 13 musical numbers divided between Oudrid and Gaztambide. It was translated from an old operetta called La travesura, based on the love story of Mathilde, sister of Richard the Lionheart, and Malek-Adhel, brother of Saladin from Sophie Ristaud Cottin's 1808 novel Mathilde. It premiered at Teatro de la Zarzuela on 7 March 1863. It was re-enacted on 18 December 1863, as staded by writer and publisher Lalama.) | |
| 1863 | La Voluntad de la Niña | 1 | Miguel Carreras González | Emilio Álvarez | (Note: La Voluntad de la Niña (That Girl's Desire) premiered at the "Jovellanos" (Teatro de la Zarzuela) on 17 June 1863.) | |
| 1863 | Walter, o La Huérfana de Bruselas | 1 | Javier Gaztambide y Zía | Fernando Ossorio | (Note: Walter, o La Huérfana de Bruselas (Walter, or the Orphan of Brussels) was translated from the French and set to a libretto by Fernando Ossorio. It premiered at Teatro de la Zarzuela on the night of 5 April 1863 with moderate success.) | |
| 1863 | Por Amor al Prójimo | 1 | — | Juan Belza Rivera | (Note: Por Amor al Prójimo (For the Love Thy Neighbour) is a romantic-burlesque and humorous zarzuela based on a song by Antonio Reparaz, premiered at Teatro de la Zarzuela on wednesday 10 April 1863.) | |
| 1863 | Influencias políticas | 1 | — | Mariano Pina y Domínguez | (Note: Influencias políticas (Political Influences), in one act with verses by Mariano Pina y Domínguez, son of Mariano Pina y Bohigas, staged at the "Jovellanos" (Teatro de la Zarzuela), in Madrid, on 24 April 1863.) | |
| 1863 | Julio César | 1 | — | Luis Rivera | (Note: Julio César (Julio César), a contemporary comic Revue in one act with lyrics by Luis Rivera, premiered at Teatro de la Zarzuela on 5 June 1863 in benefit of Francisco Arderius.) | |
| 1864 | Un Marido de Lance | 1 | — | Ricardo Caltañazor | (Note: Un Marido de Lance (A Husband by Chance) is a one-act zarzuela with libretto by Ricardo Caltanazor. It premiered at Teatro de la Zarzuela on 6 June 1864.) | |
| 1865 | La Paloma Azul | 4 | — | Rafael María Liern y Cerach | (Note: La Paloma Azul (The Blue Dove) is a comic magic-zarzuela in four acts and in verse by Rafael María Liern. It premiered at Teatro del Circo on 25 February 1865.) | |
| 1866 | La Corte del Rey Reúma | 1 | José Rogel Soriano | Eusebio Blasco | (Note: La Corte del Rey Reúma (The Court of King Reúma) is a short allegorical and comic zarzuela, which premiered at Teatro de la Zarzuela on 22 December 1866.) | |
| 1866 | Los Encantos de Briján | 3 | — | Luis de Eguílaz | (Note: Los Encantos de Briján (The Charms of Briján) premiered at Teatro Variedades. The title comes from the expression "Sabes más que Briján" (You know more than Briján) – Here, Brian or O'Brien, an English music student who settled in the area of Huelva and believed he knew more than everybody else about everything.) | |
| 1866 | 1866 y 1867 | 2 | Luis Vicente Arche | José María Gutiérrez de Alba | (Note: 1866 y 1867 is a Revue musical in 21 acts shared between Cristóbal Oudrid and Luis Vicente Arche Bermejo. with libretto by José María Gutiérrez de Alba, it premiered at Teatro Real del Circo on the night of 22 December 1866.) | |
| 1867 | El Camisolín de Paco | 2 | Mariano Vázquez y Gómez | Juan Catalina | (Note: El Camisolín de Paco (Paco's Camisole) is a zarzuela in three acts with libretto by Juan Catalina, premiered at Teatro del Circo on 29 October 1867, being a total fiasco.) | |
| 1867 | La Espada de Satanás | 4 | — | Rafael María Liern y Cerach | (Note: La Espada de Satanás (Satan's Sword) is a zarzuela-fantastica with libretto by Rafael María Liern. It premiered at Teatro Novedades, in Madrid, on 23 February 1867.) | |
| 1867 | Bazar de Novias | 1 | — | Mariano Pina y Domínguez | (Note: Bazar de Novias (The Bridal Bazaar) is a one-act bailable comic zarzuela in one act and 8 musical numbers and text by Mariano Pina. It premiered with acclaim at Teatro de los Bufos Madrileños (Teatro Variedades) on the night of 9 April 1867.) | |
| 1867 | Un Estudiante de Salamanca | 3 | — | Luis Rivera | (Note: Un Estudiante de Salamanca (A Salamanca's Student) is a comic zarzuela with libretto by Luis Rivera. It premiered at Teatro de la Zarzuela on the night of 4 December 1867.) | |
| 1868 | Don Isidro en San Isidro | 1 | — | Mariano Fernández | (Note: Don Isidro en San Isidro (Don Isidro in San Isidro) is a comic opera with libretto by Mariano Fernández. It premiered at Teatro del Circo on 20 Abril 1868, being partially censored shortly thereafter by the censorship of the Spanish Crown.) | |
| 1868 | Café Teatro y Restaurante Cantante | 1 | — | Emilio Álvarez | (Note: Café Teatro y Restaurante Cantante (Café-théâtre and Singing Restaurant) is an amiable comic-lyrical zarzuela of artistic culinary taste in one act zarzuela with libretto by Emilio Álvarez. It premiered at Teatro del Circo, in Madrid, on 11 July 1868.) | |
| 1869 | La Reina de los Aires | 1 | — | Rafael García y Santisteban | (Note: La Reina de los Aires (The Queen of the Air) is a comic sainete in one act with text by librettist Rafael García y Santisteban. It premiered at Teatro del Circo in February 1869.) | |
| 1869 | Yo y Mi Tía | 1 | — | Mariano Fernández | (Note: Yo y mi Tía (Me and My Aunt) is a comic opera (unpublished work) with text by Mariano Fernández Cipriano, premiered on 20 May 1860.) | |
| 1869 | Acuerdo Municipal | 1 | Enrique Alejo y Broca | Antonio Ramiro y Garcia | (Note: Acuerdo Municipal (Municipal Agreement) is a zarzuela with libretto by Antonio Ramiro y Garcia over an original by Miguel Ramos Carrión. It premiered on 6 December 1869 at the "Jovellanos" (Teatro de la Zarzuela).) | |
| 1870 | El Paciente Job | 1 | — | Ricardo de la Vega de Oreiro y Lema | (Note: El Paciente Job (The Pacient Job), a zarzuela with libretto by Ricardo de la Vega, son of Ventura de la Vega, premiered on 13 May 1870 at the "Jovellanos" (Teatro de la Zarzuela).) | |
| 1870 | La Gata de Mari Ramos | 2 | — | Mariano Pina y Bohigas | (Note: La Gata de Mari Ramos (Mari Ramos' She-cat) is a zarzuela-fantastica in 2 acts with libretto by Mariano Pina y Bohigas (1820–1883), father of writer Mariano Pina y Dominguez (1840–1895). It premiered at Teatro de la Zarzuela on 27 January 1870.) | |
| 1870 | El Molinero de Subiza | 3 | — | Luis de Eguílaz | (Note: El Molinero de Subiza (The Miller of Subiza (town)), a romanesque zarzuela in three acts, premiered at Teatro de la Zarzuela on 21 December 1870. The drama mixes a romantic love story with historical facts, taking place in the year 1134 at the Subiza Castle, in Navarra, and addresses the rebellion of noblemen against Ramiro del Monje and the crowning of García Ramírez.) | |
| 1871 | Justos por Pecadores | 3 | Pedro Miguel Marqués y García | Luis Mariano de Larra | (Note: Justos por Pecadores (Justs by Sinners) is Pedro Miguel Marqués y García's first zarzuela, and also his first collaborative work with Cristóbal Oudrid.) | |
| 1872 | Miró y Compañía o Una Fiesta en Alcorcón | 1 | — | Francisco Garcia Vivanco | (Note: Miró y Compañía o Una Fiesta en Alcorcón (Miró and Cia. or a Party in Alcorcón) is a short comic opera in one act and prose set over an original libretto by Francisco García Vivanco. It premiered at Teatro Español de Barcelona on the night of 8 August 1872 by Compañia de la Zarzuela from the "Jovellanos" (Teatro de la Zarzuela).) | |
| 1874 | El Testamento Azul | 3 | Francisco Asenjo Barbieri, Rafael Aceves y Lozano | Rafael María Liern y Cerach | (Note: El Testamento Azul (The Blue Will) is a zarzuela in three acts with libretto by Rafael María Liern. It premiered at Teatro Jardines del Buen Retiro, in Madrid, on 20 July 1874. This was a collaborative work Barbieri, who arranged the first act, Oudrid, the second, and Lozano, the third.) | |
| 1874 | Ildara | 4 | — | Ricardo Puente y Brañas | (Note: Ildara (Ildara) is Cristóbal Oudrid's pretentious magnum opus, presented at the "Jovellanos" on 5 January 1874, was a complete fiasco both by public and critics.) | |
| 1874 | ¡El Demonio de los Bufos! | 1 | — | Rafael María Liern y Cerach | (Note: ¡El Demonio de los Bufos! (The Demon of the Bouffes!) is an eccentric comic-opera in one act with verses by Rafael María Liern set over a libretto by Ricardo Puente y Brañas. It premiered at Teatro de la Zarzuela on 24 June 1874.) | |
| 1874 | El Señor de Cascarrabias | 2 | — | Rafael María Liern y Cerach | (Note: El Señor de Cascarrabias (The Lord of Cascarrabias) is a zarzuela in two acts with text by Rafael María Liern premiered at Teatro Jardines del Buen Retiro on 17 August 1874.) | |
| 1875 | Compuesto y Sin Novia | 3 | — | Mariano Pina y Domínguez | (Note: Compuesto y Sin Novia (Behaved without a Bride) is a comic zarzuela with lyrics by Mariano Pina y Domínguez, directed by Oudrid himself. It premiered at Teatro de la Zarzuela on 5 December 1875.) | |
| 1876 | ¡La Paz! | 1 | — | Ricardo Puente y Brañas | (Note: La Paz (Peace) is a purposely lyrical zarzuela with libretto by Ricardo Puente y Brañas, which premiered at Teatro de la Comedia, in Madrid, on 20 April 1876.) | |
| 1876 | Blancos y Azules | 3 | Manuel Fernández Caballero, José Casares | José María Nogués, Rafael María Liern y Cerach | (Note: Blancos y Azules (Whites and Blues) is a lyrical-drama in three acts with music by Fernández Caballero and José Casares. It premiered at Teatro Apolo on 14 October 1876, and a replica on 22 December of that year, although both performances did not achieve much success most probably because of the poor verses provided by José Maria Nogués and Rafael Maria Liern.) | |
| 1876 | Los Pajes del Rey | 2 | — | Luis Mariano de Larra | (Note: Los Pajes del Rey (The pages of the King) is a zarzuela in two acts with text by Luis Mariano de Larra. This is Oudrid's final stage work, which premiered at Teatro de la Zarzuela on 20 October 1876.) | |
| 1884 | El Consejo de los Diez (Op. post) | 3 | Gabriel Balart | Aurora Sánchez y Aroca | (Note: El Consejo de los Diez (The Council of Ten) is a posthumous historical drama divided into 3 acts and 6 scenes, set over José María Nogués y Gastaldi's original libretto by Aurora Sánches y Aroca. It premiered at Teatro Apolo on 7 May 1884. The public applauded the scenes of the play much in respect for Oudrid and his body of work, although that type of zarzuela was already being considered something out of fashion.) | |
