= María Pulpillo =

Spanish singer

María Pulpillo (1763–1809) was a Spanish singer.

She was engaged at the two Royal Theatres in Madrid, Madrid, Teatro de la Cruz and Teatro del Príncipe between 1778 and 1794. She belonged to the most well known singers of the Spanish opera of her time, and was a leading interpreter of the Italian opera fashionable in Spain at the time.
