= Polonia Rochel =

Polonia Rochel (c. 1745–1802) was a Spanish actress and opera singer. She was engaged at the two Royal Theatres in Madrid, Teatro de la Cruz and Teatro del Príncipe between 1769 and 1797. She belonged to the most well-known stage actors of the royal stage of her time and was the subject of several plays and tonadilla songs. Aside from her career as an actor, she was also active as a singer. However, she was not as successful as a singer as she was as an actor, and ended her career as a singer in 1785, long before she ended her career as an actor.
