= Teresa de Robles =

Spanish stage actor

Teresa de Robles (?–1726) was a Spanish stage actress, singer, and theater director.

She was born to the actors Juan Luis de Robles and Ana de Escamilla (niece of Antonio de Escamilla), sister of Juan and Bartolomé de Robles and married actor Rosendo López Estrada in 1679.

She was engaged at the royal theatres in Madrid, Teatro de la Cruz and Teatro del Príncipe, between 1679 and 1708. She served as director of the theatre from 1700 to 1701. She often performed for the royal court.

Teresa de Robles is one of the 96 actresses who, at some point in their careers between the end of the 16th and the end of the 17th centuries, were authors of comedies, that is, they directed or shared the direction of a theatrical company as businesswomen.
