= Manuela Carmona =

Spanish stage actor

Manuela Carmona (1770–1827) was a Spanish stage actress.

She was engaged at the Teatro de la Cruz in 1805, served as the theater manager in 1811–1816.
