= Manuel Quijano =

Manuel Quijano may refer to:

- Manuel Quijano, Spanish singer, member of the group Café Quijano
- Manuel Quijano (composer) (died 1838), Spanish composer
