= Manuel Quijano (composer) =

Spanish composer and theatre director

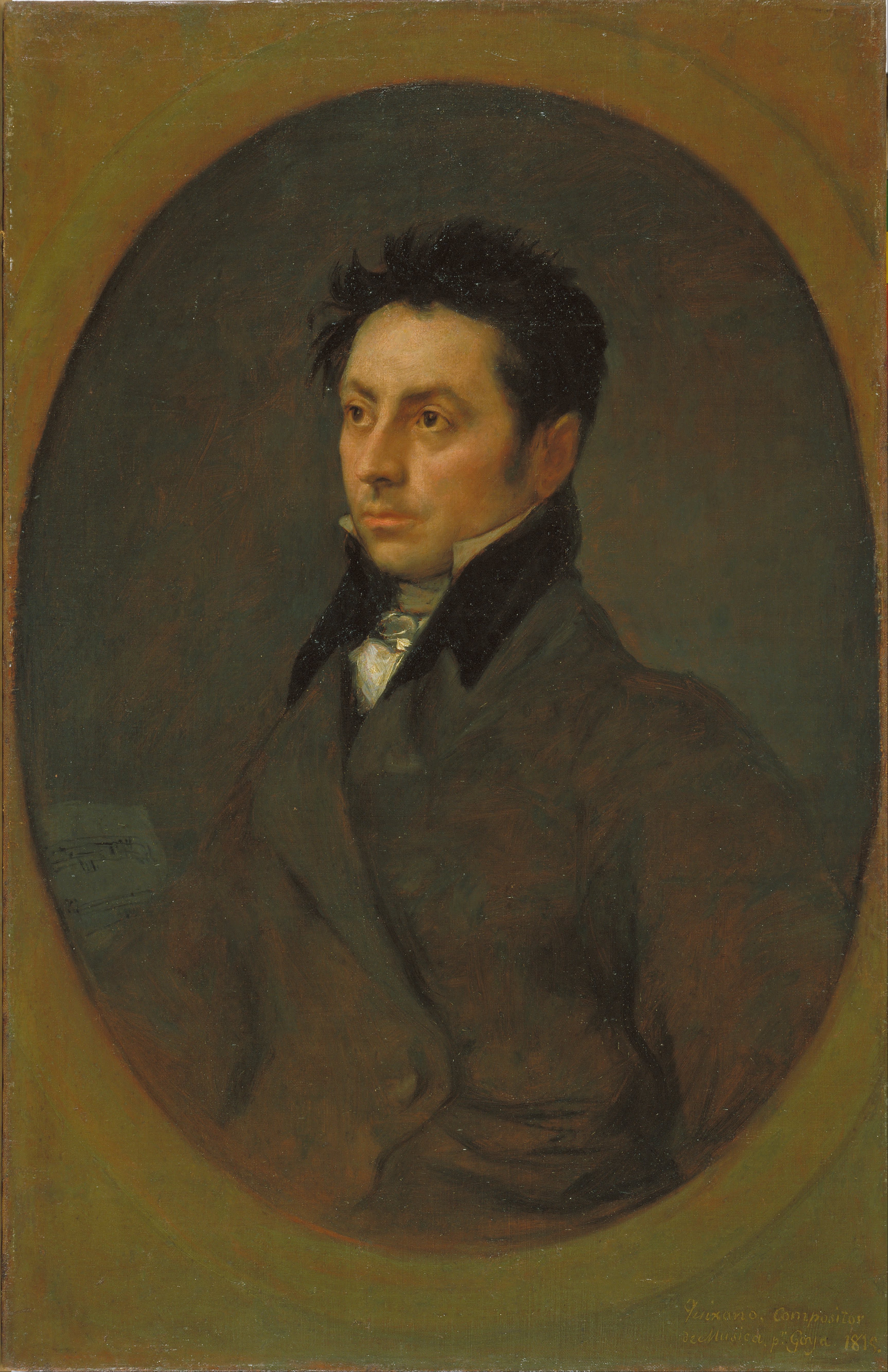
Portrait of Quijano by Francisco de Goya (1815), MNAC, Barcelona

Manuel Quijano (died 23 November 1838) was a Spanish composer and theatre director.

Nothing is known about Quijano's early years, including the date and place of his birth. His name first appears in records at the time of his appointment to the position of "composer and music teacher" at the Teatro de la Cruz in Madrid, which he took in the 1814-15 season. He was heavily active in the city's musical and cultural life, serving as well as the music director at the Teatro del Príncipe. At the foundation of the Liceo Artístico y Literario in 1837, he was listed as one of the musicians involved. In 1819, at the death of Carlos IV, he was selected to design the musical program for the funeral. Besides composition, Quijano worked as an arranger and orchestrator as part of his theatrical duties; he also taught singers and instrumentalists. The Municipal Historical Library of Madrid contains a number of his works, while the Museu Nacional d'Art de Catalunya owns a portrait of him by Francisco de Goya. He died in Madrid.
