= Monument to Federico García Lorca =

Federico García Lorca
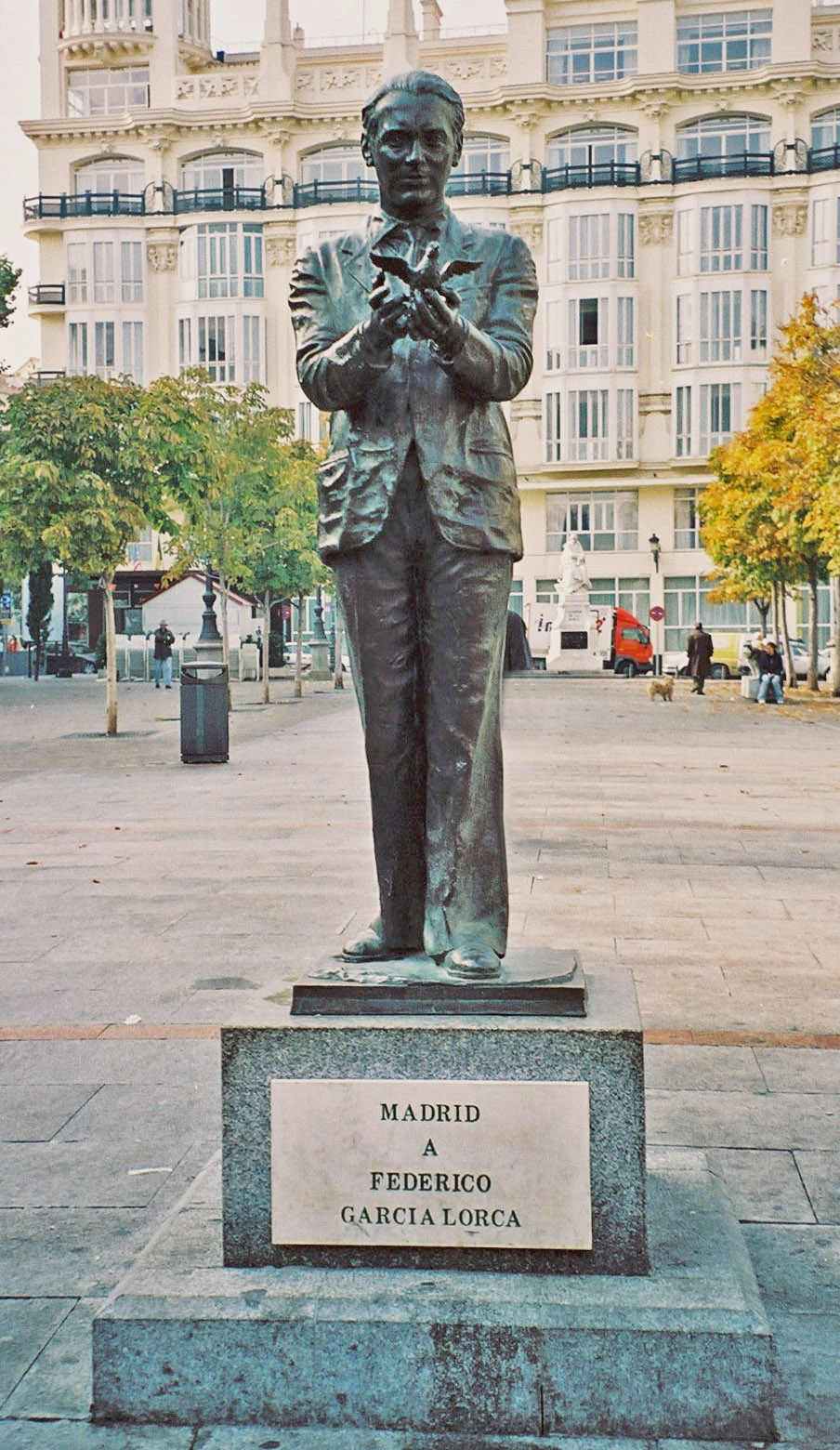
- Interactive map of Federico García Lorca
- Location: Plaza de Santa Ana, Madrid, Spain
- Coordinates: 40.414755555556°N 3.7005111111111°W
- Designer: Julio López Hernández
- Material: Bronze, granite
- Dedicated to: Federico García Lorca

Federico García Lorca or the Monument to Federico García Lorca is an instance of public art in Madrid, Spain. Located at the Plaza de Santa Ana, in front of the Teatro Español, it consists of a bronze statue of the aforementioned poet and playwright.

== History and description ==
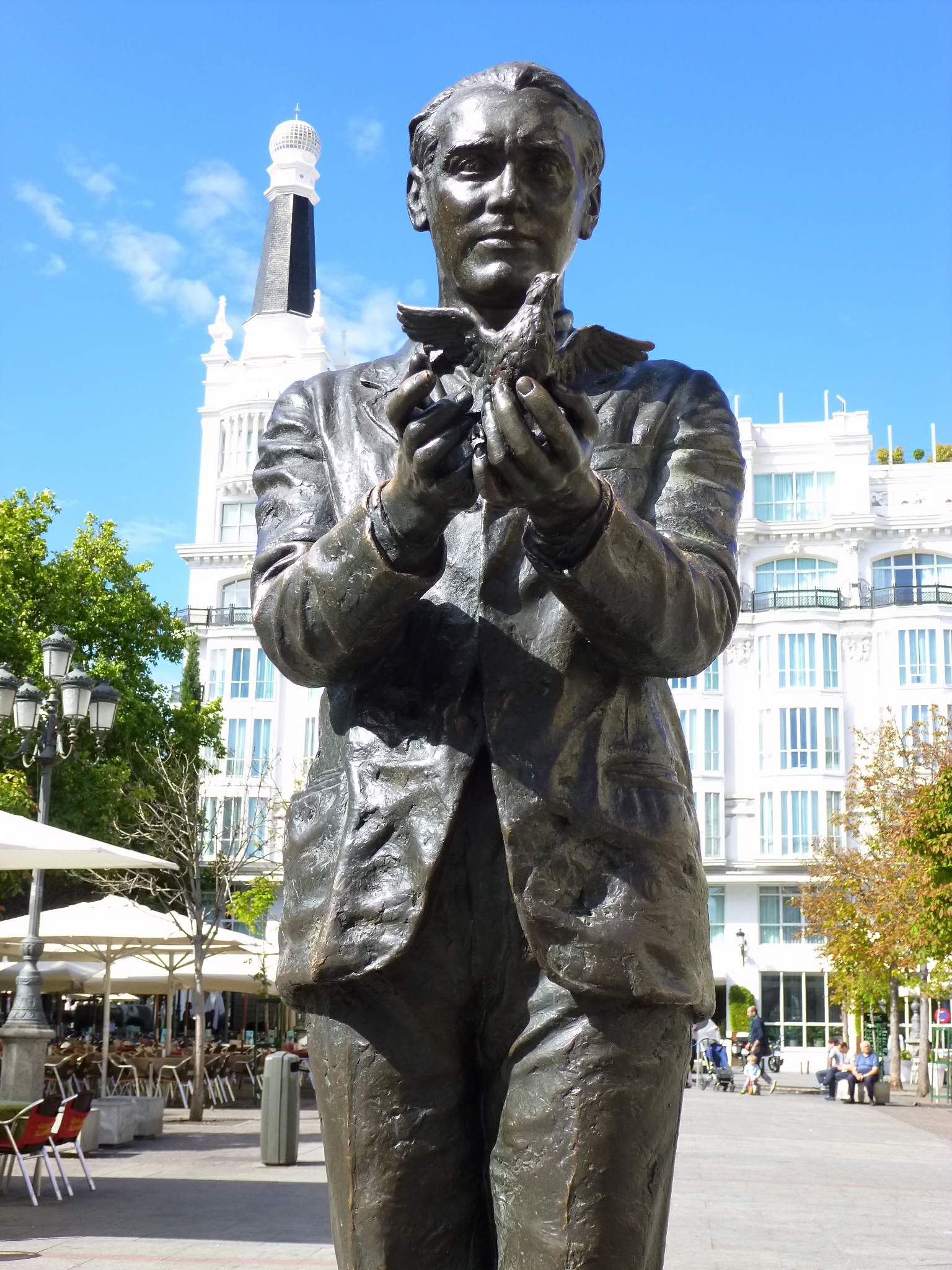

The idea for the monument traces back to 1984, via a petition by Miguel Narros (then director of the Teatro Español), who asked the Ayuntamiento for the erection of a statue dedicated to García Lorca, on the 50th anniversary of the first time the play Yerma was performed.

A work by Julio López Hernández, its inception took place between 1984 and 1986. It was subsequently stored for about a decade at the Cuartel del Conde-Duque, during the reform works of its intended location, the Plaza de Santa Ana.

The full body bronze statue representing the poet is looking at the Teatro Español, while holding a lark about to take off between his hands. Larks and nightingales are common motifs in his poems.

The inscription reads madrid, a federico garcía lorca ("Madrid, to Federico García Lorca").

Still a symbol of the polarized past of Spain by the turn of the 21st century, according to David Crocker "the statue, at least, is still an emblem of the contested past: each day, the Left puts a red kerchief on the neck of the statue, and someone from the Right comes later to take it off". In April 2011, during a vandal attack, the lark was removed from his hands.
