= Rosa de Eguílaz y Renart =

Spanish playwright and journalist

- Born: 11 October 1864; Madrid, Spain
- Occupations: Playwright, journalist
- Father: Luis de Eguílaz

Rosa de Eguílaz y Renart (born 11 October 1864; date of death unknown) was a Spanish playwright and journalist. She was the daughter of playwright Luis de Eguílaz.

As an orphan only eleven years old, Rosa de Eguílaz y Renart presented Retrato de su señor padre, and Una cantora del siglo XV (in oil) at the Exhibition of 1876. She belonged to the Women's Section of the Ibero-American Union and contributed to magazines such as El Mundo de los Niños and La Edad Feliz. Two of her works are known to have premiered at the Teatro de la Comedia in Madrid: Después de Dios (1889), and Mujer famosa (1891). The latter was an Iberian court drama about the problems caused by a woman using a male pseudonym to find success as a writer.
