= Luis de Eguílaz =

Spanish writer (1830–1874)

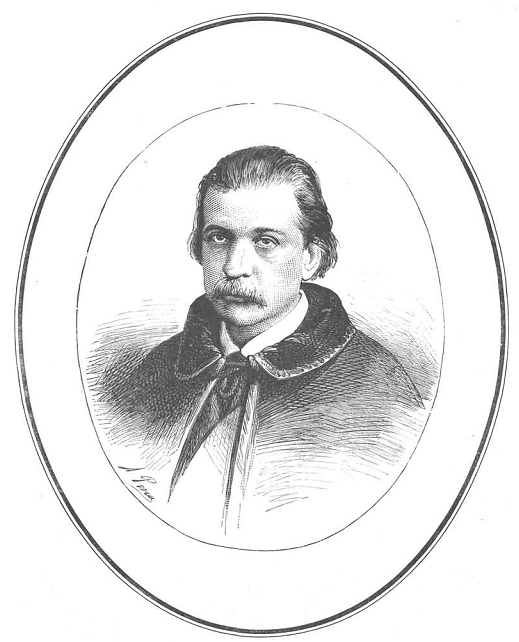
- Luis de Eguílaz in La Ilustración Española y Americana
- Born: Damaso Luis Martínez Eguílaz y Eguílaz; 20 August 1830; Sanlúcar de Barrameda, Spain (Note: According to La Ilustración Española y Americana he was born in Sanlúcar de Barrameda in 1830. Torreblanca López specifies 20 August 1830, nevertheless, in Granada.)
- Died: 22 July 1874 (aged 43); Madrid, Spain
- Resting place: Cemetery of Saint Nicholas
- Other name: El Licenciado Escribe
- Occupation: Writer
- Children: Rosa de Eguílaz y Renart

Damaso Luis Martínez Eguílaz y Eguílaz (20 August 1830 – 22 July 1874) was a Spanish writer and dramatist, father of playwright Rosa de Eguílaz y Renart.

== Biography ==
Luis de Eguílaz was a disciple of the humanist and unfrocked friar Juan María Capitán. He found his dramatic vocation early; at age 14 he premiered the one-act comedy Por dinero baila el perro in Jerez de la Frontera. He studied law in Madrid and began his literary career with a critical study of the novel Clemencia by Fernán Caballero. He sometimes used the pseudonym El Licenciado Escribe (the graduate writer), a play on the name of the famous French dramatist Eugène Scribe.

In court he defended Eugenio de Ochoa, the man of letters and illegitimate son of Sebastián Miñano. Thanks to him, Eguílaz was able to release his first serious work, Verdades amargas, in 1853, the success of which placed him among the most popular authors of the time. In the last years of his life he directed the National Historical Archive. He died on 22 July 1874 in his home on San Agustín Street in Madrid, and was buried in the Cemetery of Saint Nicholas. The news greatly affected Marcelino Menéndez y Pelayo, who was spending that summer in Santander, and composed a poem in Eguílaz's memory dated 5 August 1874. There is an oil portrait of Luis de Eguílaz in the Ateneo de Sanlúcar de Barrameda.

== Works ==
Luis de Eguílaz's dramatic works are vigorously conceived, with well-defined characters, but have an excessive and perhaps inflexible lyricism. His theater is that of traditionalist ideology, and indoctrinates through the procedures of costumbrismo. His works can be divided into three groups:

1. Semi-historical works with lyrical features, such as Las querellas del rey Sabio (1858), where he utilizes a good imitation of the medieval fabla; El patriarca del Turia (1874), in which he refers to the writer Juan de Timoneda; La vaquera de la Finojosa (1874), inspired by the famous serranilla of Íñigo López de Mendoza; El caballero del milagro, where he dramatizes the life of the baroque writer Agustín de Rojas Villandrando; Los dos camaradas, in which Miguel de Cervantes and John of Austria are the main characters; Miguel de Cervantes, the first part of which was left without an ending by Ventura de la Vega at his death, which Eguílaz finished and added a dramatic one-act proem titled "Un hallazgo literario" which explains the genesis of the work; Alarcón (1853), about the Mexican playwright Juan Ruiz de Alarcón; Una aventura de Tirso (1855), about the celebrated comedy writer Gabriel Téllez; Una broma de Quevedo; Cuando ahorcaron a Quevedo; Lope de Rueda; etc.
2. Works of moralizing and practical tenor, such as Mentiras dulces (1859), Verdades amargas (1853), Los soldados de plomo (1865), La cruz del matrimonio (1860; his greatest success), Grazalema, Quiero y no puedo, La vida de Juan Soldado, etc.
3. Zarzuela librettos: El salto del pasiego (1878; posthumous, with music by Manuel Fernández Caballero), El molinero de Subiza (1870; music by Cristóbal Oudrid, undoubtedly his greatest success in this genre), El esclavo (1857), etc.
