= Juan Lombía =

Spanish artist (1806–1851)

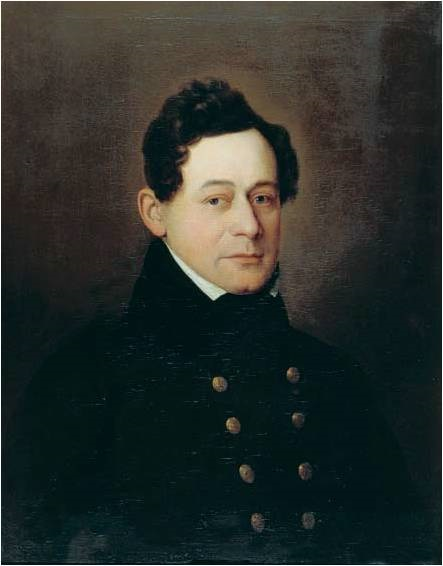
- Portrait of Juan Lombía, by Antonio María Esquivel. 1837. (Museo de Zaragoza)
- Born: Juan Lombía; 1806; Zaragoza
- Died: February 22, 1851 (aged 44–45); Madrid
- Occupations: Actor, Playwright, Theatrical impresario

Juan Lombía (1806 in Zaragoza – 1851 in Madrid) was a Spanish actor, author and theatre impresario. As an author, he is only remembered today for his 1808 El sitio de Zaragoza, a one-act prologue dedicated to the Dos de Mayo Uprising. As impresario at Teatro de la Cruz, he was responsible for the staging of numerous works by José Zorrilla, among them Don Juan Tenorio.
