= Juan Guillén Buzarán =

Juan Guillén Buzarán (Cartagena 29 September 1819 – Madrid, 8 January 1892) was a Spanish military officer, writer and literary collaborator in the press of the time. Author of Historia anecdótica de la corte de Felipe III, Fray Pablo de Salamanca, and La torre de los espíritus. He moved to Madrid in 1833, where he studied at San Fulgencio de Murcia, joining the Spanish army from 1839 until 1859.
