= José Rogel =

Spanish conductor & composer (1829-1901)

José Rogel (24 December 1829 – 25 February 1901) was a Spanish conductor and composer of theatrical works in the zarzuela genre.

== Life ==
Rogel was born in Orihuela, Alicante, in 1829; he began music under Cascales and Gil, organist and conductor of Orihuela Cathedral, and made great progress, until sent to Valencia by his father to study law. The six years which he spent there were however devoted more to music than to law, under the guidance of Pascual Perez, from whom he learned composition and other branches of practical music.

After completing his legal course and taking his degree at Madrid, Rogel was able to indulge his taste, and became conductor and composer to several theatres. He became successful as a composer of zarzuelas; he wrote about 80, some in collaboration. These include Revista de un muerto, Un Viage de mil demonios, El Joven Telemaco, El Rey Midas and Los Infiernos de Madrid.

Rogel died in Cartagena in 1901.
