= Rosina Penco =

Italian operatic soprano

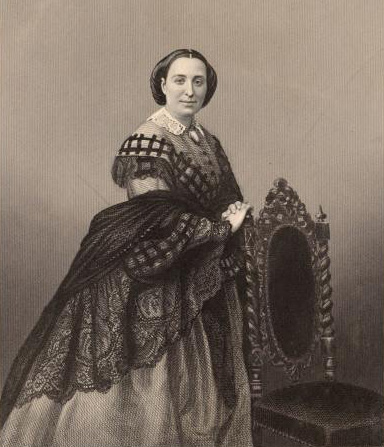
Rosina Penco

Rosina Penco (1823 in Naples – 1894 in Poretta, near Bologna) was an Italian operatic soprano. She is most notable for creating the role of Leonora in Il trovatore by Verdi in Rome in 1853.

== Career ==
Rosina Penco sang in operas by Rossini, Bellini and Donizetti in various German theatres in 1850. She was praised for her fiery stage temperament and her virtuosic singing, in particular for an excellent trill.

In Italy, she appeared in the title role of Verdi's Luisa Miller in Naples in 1851 and created roles in operas by Errico Petrella and Giovanni Bottesini. In 1853, she created the leading soprano role of Leonora in Giuseppe Verdi's hugely successful opera Il trovatore. She had appeared in Trieste the previous year as Azucena in Il trovatore by Francesco Cortesi, based on the same Spanish play as Verdi's opera. Verdi prized her for her combination of vocal agility with fervid dramatic commitment. The composer recommended her for the leading soprano roles of his subsequent operas La traviata and Un ballo in maschera, saying that Penco had much spirit and a good stage presence. She subsequently appeared as Amelia in Un ballo in maschera at Covent Garden and the Théâtre Italien, Paris. Rosina Penco was praised for her sweetness of voice combined with highly dramatic acting and vocal agility. Her success in the leading role of Leonora in the enormously popular opera Il trovatore led to further engagements in the top opera houses in London, Paris, Berlin, Madrid and Saint Petersburg.

In 1858, however Verdi lamented that Penco had lost the fire that had distinguished her earlier appearances and had retreated into an old-fashioned manner of singing and performance like that of thirty years earlier. Penco retired from the stage in 1875.
