= Gabriel Balart =

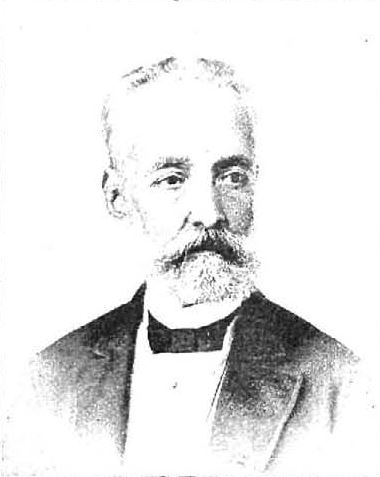
Gabriel Balart (1895)

Gabriel Balart i Crehuet was a Spanish composer, conductor, musical director and teacher of Catalan origin. He was born in Barcelona on 8 June 1824 and died there on 5 July 1893. He studied at the Paris Conservatory before composing several pieces of salon music. He wrote five romantic symphonies. His most successful opera was his light opera Amore y Arte.

== Biography ==
At the age of seven, Balart studied music theory, piano and violin with Francesc Sala before being taught composition and violin by Antoni Pasarell. He went to Paris in 1842 to study at the Paris Conservatory with Jean-Delphin Alard and Michele Carafa. In 1849 he went to Milan, where he made a career as an opera conductor at the Teatro Re, and was subsequently appointed musical director of the Liceu in Barcelona in 1853. He devoted himself to directing and teaching and would later notably become the master of Teobaldo Power. Balart stopped composing in 1886 after being appointed Professor of Harmony and Composition at the Conservatori Superior de Música del Liceu in Barcelona, of which he was the director from 1889 to 1893.
