= Teatro Español (Madrid) =

Public theatre in Madrid, Spain

Coordinates: 40°24′53.7″N 3°41′59.64″W

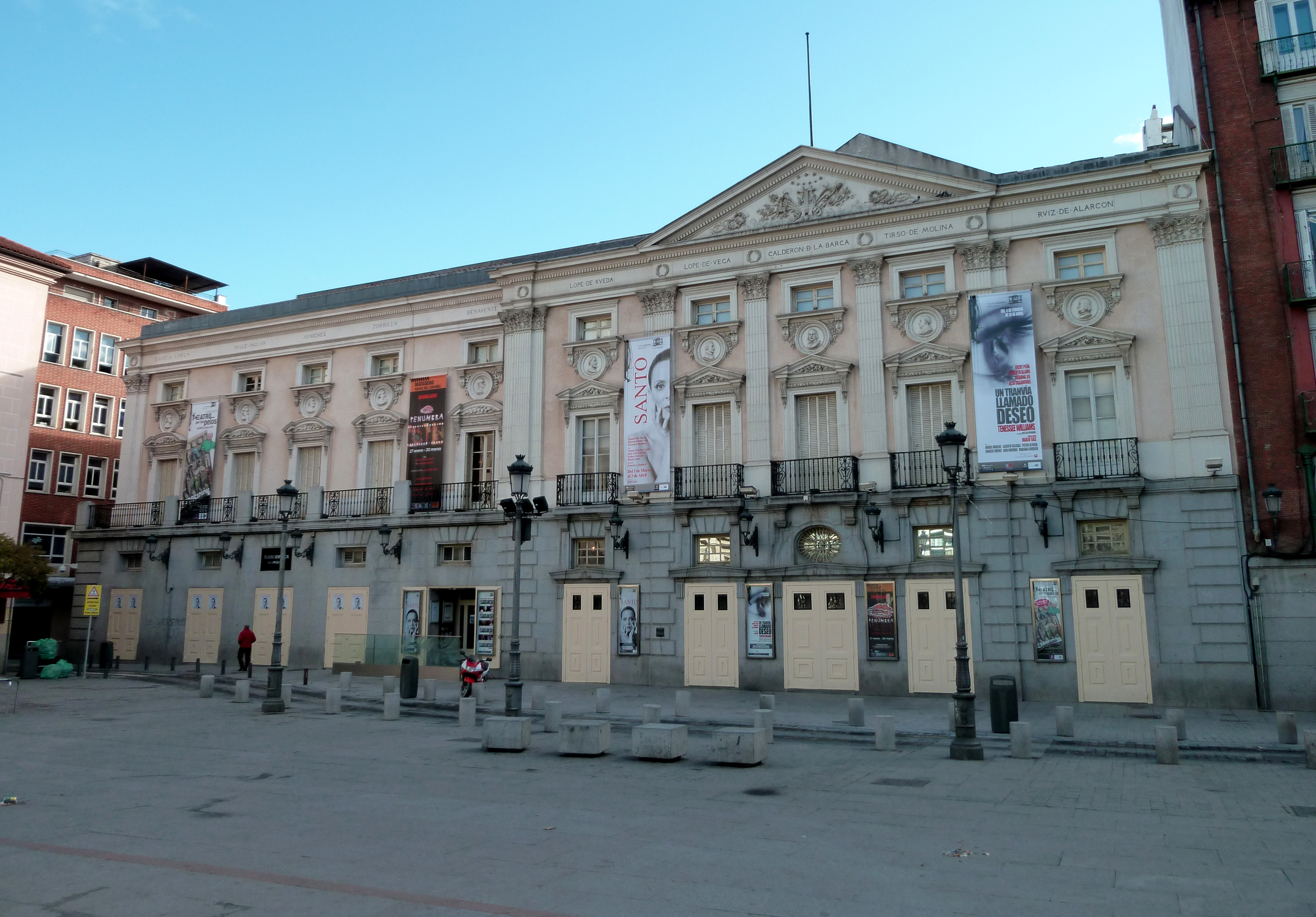
- Façade of Teatro Español facing Plaza de Santa Ana
- Interactive map of Teatro Español
- Address: Madrid; Spain
- Capacity: 763
- Type: Theatre

Construction
- Opened: 21 September 1583
- Rebuilt: 1887–1895
- Architect: Román Guerrero

Website
- www.teatroespanol.es/en

Teatro Español ('Español Theatre' or 'Spanish Theatre'), formerly Teatro del Príncipe and Corral del Príncipe, is a public theatre administered by the Government of Madrid, Spain. The original location was an open-air theatre in medieval times, where short performances and some theatrical pieces, which became part of famous classical literature in later years, were staged. Its establishment was authorized by a royal decree of Philip II in 1565.

The 18th century also marked the definitive establishment of Teatro del Príncipe, which had its own group of followers, the "chorizos," and were in constant struggle with the "polacos," who preferred the performances of the rival Teatro de la Cruz. By this time, Leandro Fernández de Moratín premiered La comedia nueva at Teatro del Príncipe. On 11 July 1802, the theatre was engulfed by fire, and re-opened five years later with the final renovations supervised by architect Juan de Villanueva.

The current building, erected in Neoclassical style according to a design by Román Guerrero, was built between 1887 and 1895 under the direction of Natalio Grueso. In front of the theatre is the Plaza de Santa Ana, built after the demolition of a 16th-century Carmelite monastery. The names of famous theatre personalities are engraved on the façade, among them the name of Federico García Lorca.

== History ==
=== Teatro del Príncipe ===
The former Teatro del Príncipe, or Corral del Príncipe, was a theatre of zarzuelas acquired by the brotherhood Cofradía de la Pasión y de la Soledad on 9 February 1580. By the end of that year, Corral de la Pacheca was acquired by the same brotherhood, which also bought two other buildings from Álava de Ibarra, doctor to Philip II, and another sold by Don Rodrigo de Herrera. It was built from 7 May 1582 with opening on 21 September of the following year with a play by Vázquez and John of Ávila.

The theatre consisted of a stage, costume room, bleachers for men, ninety five portable banks, a hall for women, balconies with iron railings or grilles, master channels and roofs covering the stands. The courtyard was paved and an awning made to block the sun, but not the rain. This original structure was maintained until 1735, when a new building, concluded in ten years, was erected by architect Juan Bautista Sacchetti in cooperation with Ventura Rodríguez. At that time its name was changed from Corral del Príncipe to Teatro del Príncipe. Later, the site became a theatre of work which was one of the largest in the country. In 1849, it was transformed into the current Teatro Español, the only theatre in Madrid really similar to an ancient open-air theatre.

During the reign of Philip II, the City Council in Madrid established two permanent playhouses or "corrales". One was Corral de la Cruz and the other Teatro del Principe, both housed at Iglesia de San Sebastian. The fervor for theatre plays among the population was so intense that two corral groups were formed, the "chorizos" and "polacos." The followers of the first group were Philip IV and Lope de Vega, and the second the "nobility." The rivalry between them was so intense to the extent of disturbing each other's programmes and closing theatres under the orders of Count Arnada, minister of Charles III.

In the 18th century, both theatres were demolished and rebuilt in Italian architectural style with modern facilities such as an expansive stage with mechanized operation and artificial lighting.

=== Teatro Español ===
In 1825, under the direction of French impresario John Grimaldi, the theatre underwent a series of improvements such as lighting and props in both structural and artistic fields. By royal decree, Teatro del Príncipe changed its name to Teatro Español in 1849. Its capacity was of 1,200 spectators and the owner the City Council, leased by the Government of Spain. Under the leadership of Minister of Internal Affairs José Luis Sartorius, a new model theatre was installed with the staging of Casa con dos puertas, mala es de guardar by Calderon de la Barca, on 8 April 1849. The playwright Ventura de la Vega was appointed director of the theatre. A year later he was replaced by Tomás Rodríguez Rubí, until in May 1851 the theatre passed back to the management of the municipality. In 1860, actor Manuel Catalina became director of the theatre.

Between 1887 and 1894, the architect Roman Guerrero extensively renovated the theatre in its present appearance. The theatre reopened on 12 January 1895 with the play El desdén, con el desdén, with management via concession from the City Council by Roman Guerrero and then actress María Guerrero, who staged works of Benito Pérez Galdós, the Nobel Prize of Literature Jacinto Benavente's and José de Echegaray's. Guerrero retained the management of the theatre until 1909. Over the next two decades, the theatre was occupied under concession by successive leasers, including Jacinto Benavente himself, together with actor Ricardo Calvo, with the commitment of devoting room to the Spanish Classical Theatre.

Between 1930 and 1935, except for February and May 1931, the theatre was occupied by the companies of Margarita Xirgu, and Enrique Borrás, through which the works of Federico Garcia Lorca and Rafael Alberti premiered under the direction of Cipriano Rivas Cherif. In October 1935, the concession granted to them passed over to Ricardo Calvo's and Enrique Borrás' for a period of one year, later revoked in March 1936. During the period of the Spanish Civil War, the concession of the theatre was in the hands of actor Manuel González, who staged El alcalde de Zalamea on 28 March 1939, the day the troops of Francisco Franco took Madrid.

After the war, Teatro Español underwent a major change in its legal status. It reopened on 15 April 1939, coinciding with the death anniversary of Serafín Álvarez Quintero. The ownership of the facility remained in the hands of the City Council, although the management was assumed by the Government of Spain. Between the end of the war and the mid-1940s, the concession of the theatre was handed over to the companies of Ana Adamuz, Nini Montian-Guillermo Marin, Fernando Díaz de Mendoza y Guerrero-María Guerrero López. Under a ministerial order of March 1940, a national council of theatres was created with two sections: Teatro Nacional Español, staging classic authors, and Teatro María Guerrero. The season opened on November 13 of that year with La Celestina.

The organizational unit was in charge of the Ministry of Education of Spain and the National Ministry of Education until 1951, and the Ministry of Information and Tourism from then on. After ten consecutive years, the management of the theatre was in the hands of Cayetano Luca de Tena, until in 1954 the authorities handed over the administration to José Tamayo and his company "Lope de Vega," in which actors Carlos Lemos, Núria Espert, Adolfo Marsillach and Berta Riaza performed. During the years of dictatorship, literary milestones such as Historia de una escalera and the introduction of contemporary foreign authors such as J.B. Priestley and Jean Anouilh premiered at Teatro Español. On 19 October 1975, the theatre was damaged by another fire. Its reconstruction continued until 16 April 1980, with the new production of Calderon de la Barca's La dama de Alejandría. After a whole year of joint management between the Ministry of Culture and the City Council, headed by a board of directors, the theatre went back to the municipality of Madrid on 16 October 1981, with the auditorium now accommodating 763 spectators. In 2005, the old cafeteria was transformed into a room for small events, and since 2007, the theatre's management have also been organizing events at Naves del Español theatre, located in the cultural centre Matadero Madrid, with the design of the theatre rooms provided by French scenographer Jean-Guy Lecat.

== Directors ==
Some of the directors included:

- Federico Balart (1890–1905)
- Fernando Díaz de Mendoza (1905–1908)
- Manuel González (During the Spanish Civil War)
- Felipe Lluch (1940–1941)
- Cayetano Luca de Tena (1942–1952)
- José Tamayo (1954–1962)
- Cayetano Luca de Tena (1962–1964)
- Adolfo Marsillach (1965–1966)
- Miguel Narros (1966–1970)
- Alberto González Vergel (1970–1976)
- José Luis Alonso Mañés (1979–1983)
- José Luis Gómez (1983–1984)
- Miguel Narros (1984–1989)
- Gustavo Pérez Puig (1990–2003)
- Mario Gas (2004–2012)
- Natalio Grueso (since 2012)

== Bibliography ==
- del Corral, José (2008). Gentes en el Madrid del XVII: formas de vida en el Siglo de Oro (in Spanish). Silex Ediciones. ISBN 978-84-7737-210-3.
- Duncan, Michael (1 February 2007). DK Eyewitness Travel Guide: Madrid. Dorling Kindersley US. ISBN 978-0-7566-5062-9.
- Minchot, Pia (2002). Madrid, Metropolis. A. Asppan S.L. ISBN 978-84-89439-89-4.
- Montoliú, Pedro (2002). Madrid, Villa y Corte: Calles y Plazas (in Spanish). Silex Ediciones. ISBN 8477371121.
