= Teatro de la Cruz =

Spanish theater

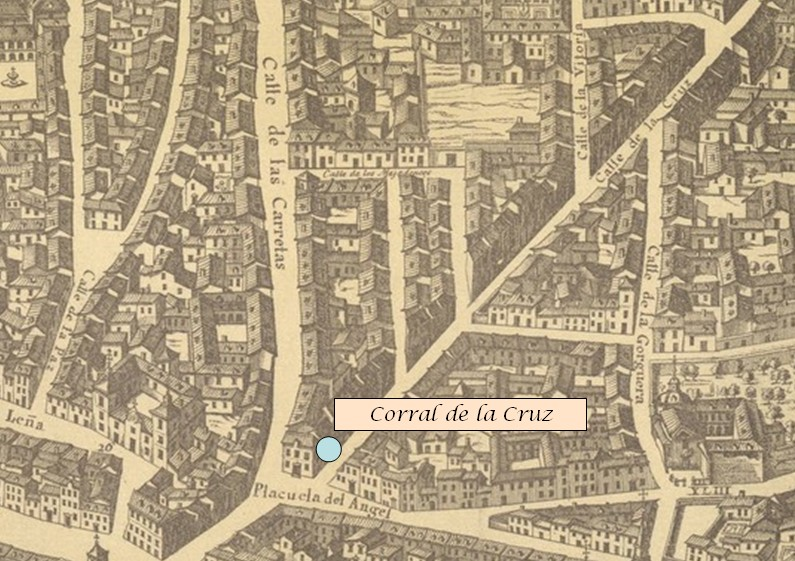
An image of Teatro de la Cruz

The Teatro de la Cruz was, for nearly 200 years, the principal theater for comedy in Madrid. Founded in 1584 by the Hermandad de la Soledad, it quickly became the premier venue of its time for Spanish comedy.

== History ==
In 1743, the theater underwent extensive renovations under the direction of architect Pedro de Ribera, who transformed it into a modern theater with seating for 1,500 spectators.

During the nineteenth century, Ribera's architectural style, particularly as embodied by the Teatro de la Cruz, faced intense official criticism. A Royal Order in 1849 declared the theater a "shame of art" and ordered its immediate demolition. However, the theater continued to operate briefly, reopening in 1850, only to be closed again between 1852 and 1857. It was finally demolished in 1859, and today, its existence is commemorated by a small plaque located at the intersection of Espoz y Mina and Calle de la Cruz in central Madrid.

Several major works premiered on its stage, including El barón (1803), La mojigata (1804), and El sí de las niñas (1806) by Leandro Fernandez de Moratin, and Don Juan Tenorio (1844) by José Zorrilla.
