= List of Catholic churches in Bohol =

Roman Catholic churches in Bohol are a distinct group of churches established during the early Spanish colonial period on the island-province of Bohol in the Philippines. Four of these churches – Baclayon, Loboc, Loon, and Maribojoc – have been declared National Cultural Treasures for their cultural, historical, and architectural importance to the Filipino people.

On October 15, 2013, one of the largest earthquakes to hit Bohol struck the island with epicentre near Sagbayan, Bohol, severely damaging the centuries-old churches in Baclayon, Dauis, Dimiao, Loay, Loboc, Loon and Maribojoc. Loon church, reputed as the largest in Bohol and one of the oldest, was destroyed and turned into a pile of rubble by the shaking and accompanying soil liquefaction, as was that of Maribojoc – completely levelled to the ground with nothing left standing.

The earthquake also destroyed newer churches made of reinforced concrete. San Isidro Labrador church in Tubigon lost its façade and other structures in the church complex. St Michael parish church of Clarin, also made of reinforced concrete, collapsed, leaving just the bell tower and the front of the church standing. Inabanga church also collapsed leaving just the façade and back of the building.

The two diocese in Bohol (Diocese of Tagbilaran and Diocese of Talibon both under the Archdiocese of Cebu) plans to restore all the churches destroyed by the earthquake.

== Alburquerque ==
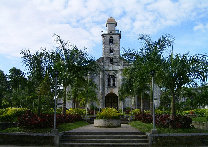
Roman Catholic church, Alburquerque, Bohol

Media related to Roman Catholic church and convent, Alburquerque, Bohol at Wikimedia Commons

The Alburquerque Church traces its beginnings as a visita of Baclayon Church. The parish was formally inaugurated in 1869. It was partially damaged when a 7.2-magnitude earthquake struck Bohol and other parts of Central Visayas on October 15, 2013. The church was declared a National Historical Landmark by the National Historical Commission of the Philippines in 2014.

== Antequera ==
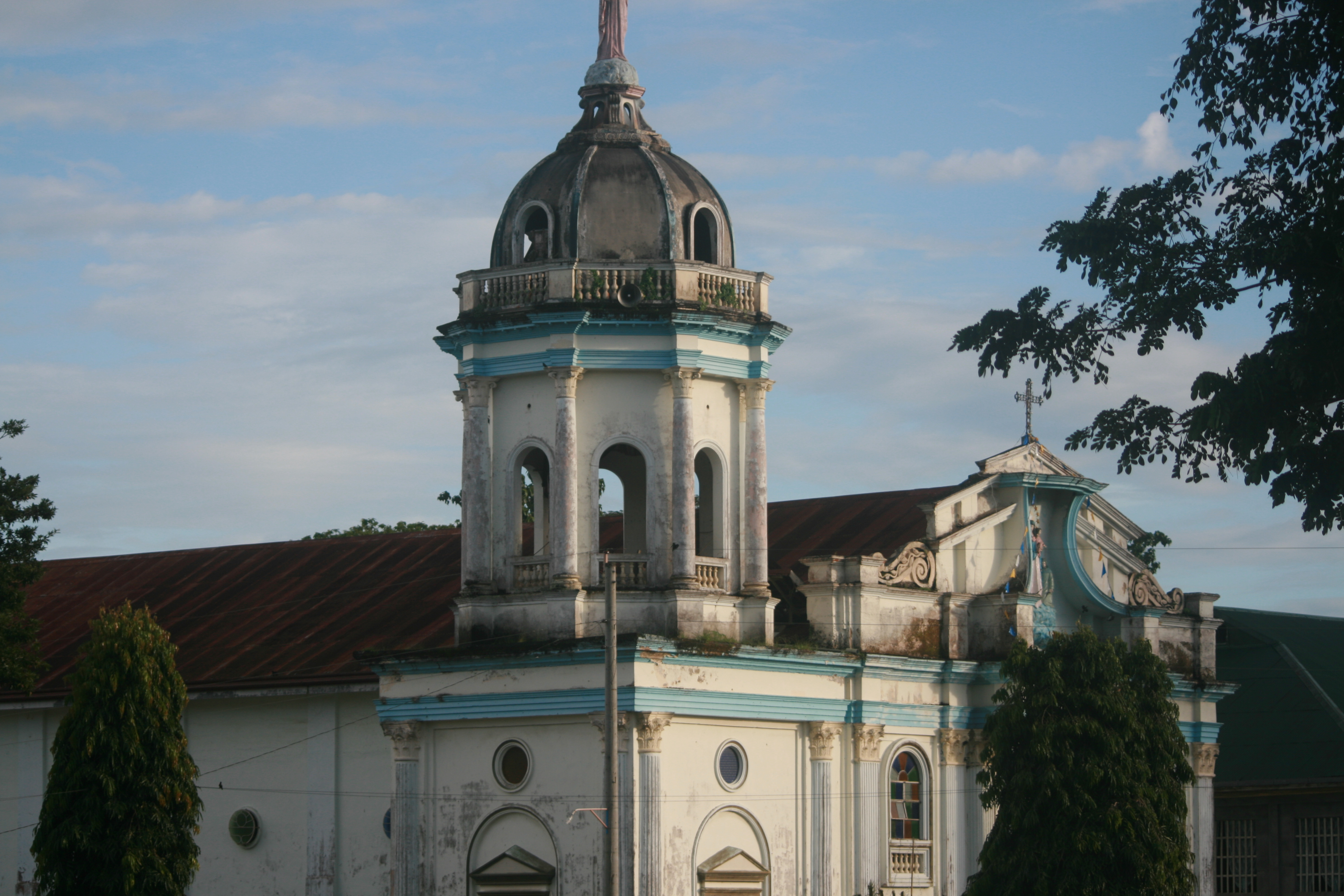
View of church of Antequera, Bohol

The present Nuestra Señora del Rosario (Our Lady of the Holy Rosary) church of Antequera was started in 1896 under the orders of Father Francisco Vega. He ordered the foundation to be constructed of sea stones cut into tablets. Construction was halted due to the 1898 revolution and the fall of the Spanish government. It was continued by 1908 and the church building, which was made of stone reinforced with cement direct from Rome, was completed in 1914 and inaugurated in December the same year. It was the first church in Bohol built with the use of cement.

The 1914 neoclassical church still stands with little renovation and some improvements. Traces of the 1896 church foundation is still evident on some unfinished plaster on the lower ends of the church's outer walls. It is not of massive stone and smaller compared to the churches of other towns in Bohol. A notable feature of the church is its belfry situated on the left hand side of the church, which has a decorative dome roof with a statue of Jesus with outstretched arms at its peak.

In August 2012, the church was repainted from white with blue and gold trims to a bright peach color with white trims.

== Balilihan ==
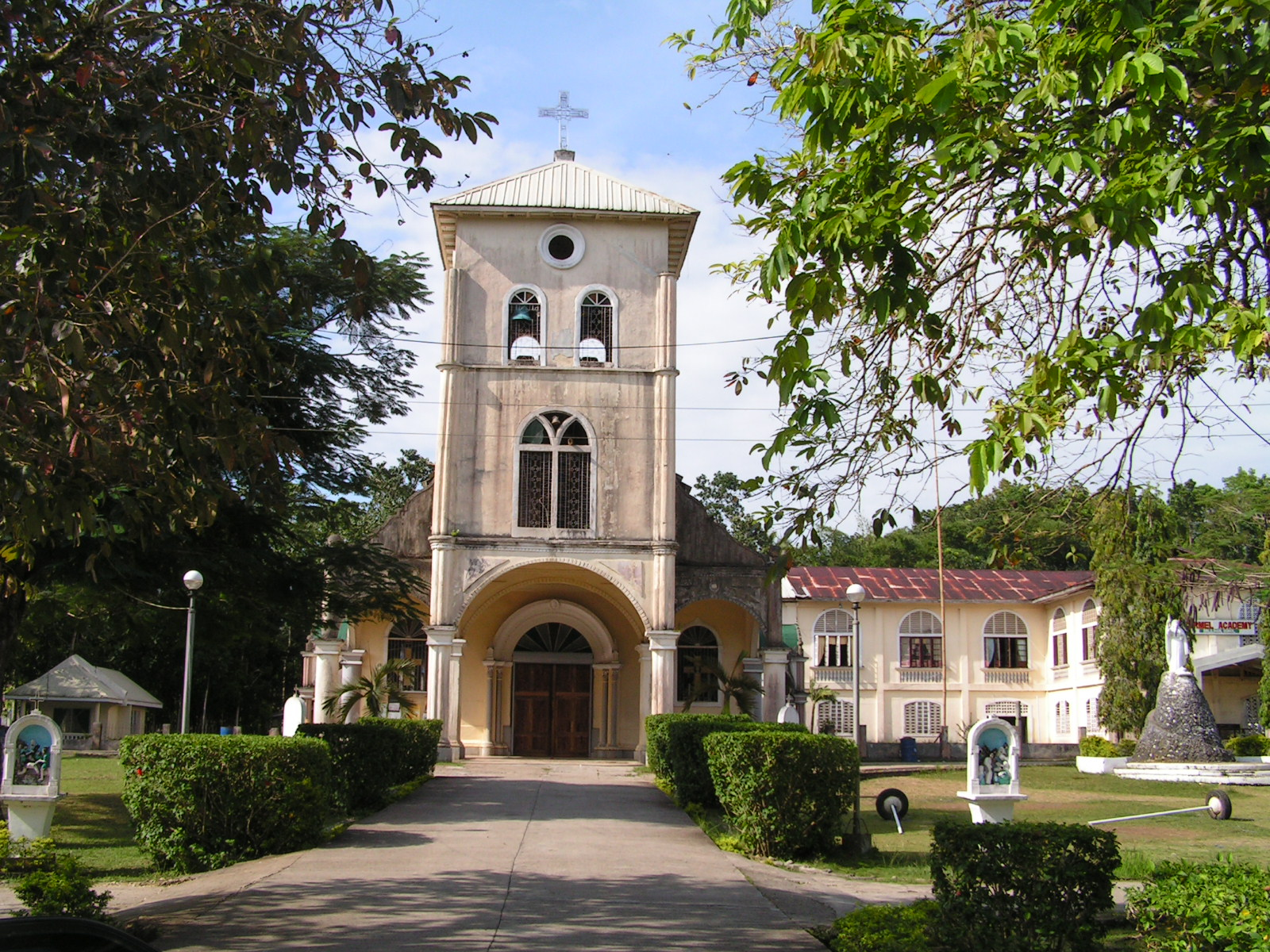
Roman Catholic church, Balilihan, Bohol

== Calape ==
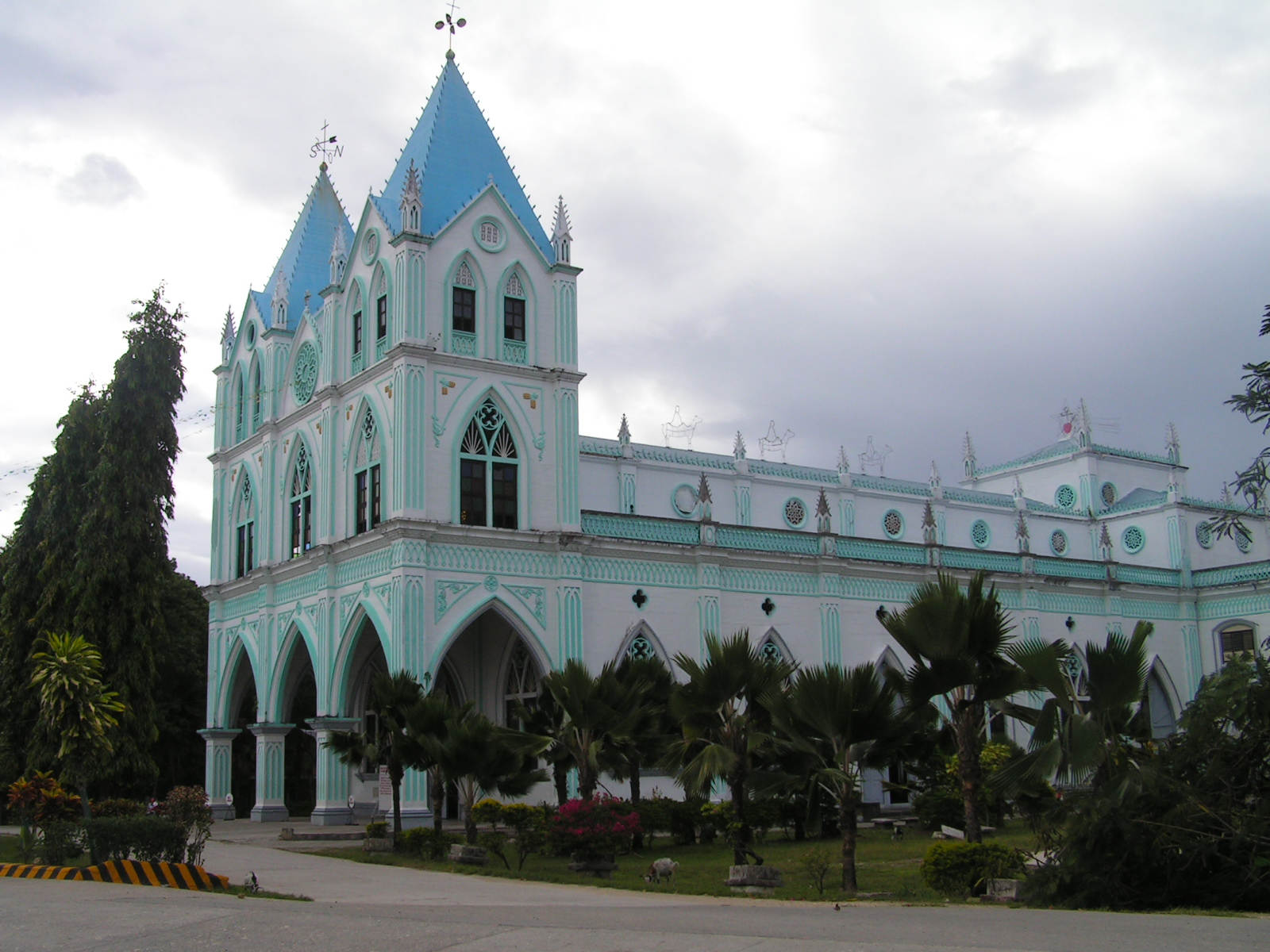
Roman Catholic church, Calape, Bohol

Calape Church, commonly known as Saint Vincent Ferrer Church, was established in 1802. The neo-Gothic church was damaged by the 7.2-magnitude 2013 Bohol earthquake and restored in 2019. It was designated in 2023 as a National Cultural Treasure by the National Museum of the Philippines.

== Candijay ==
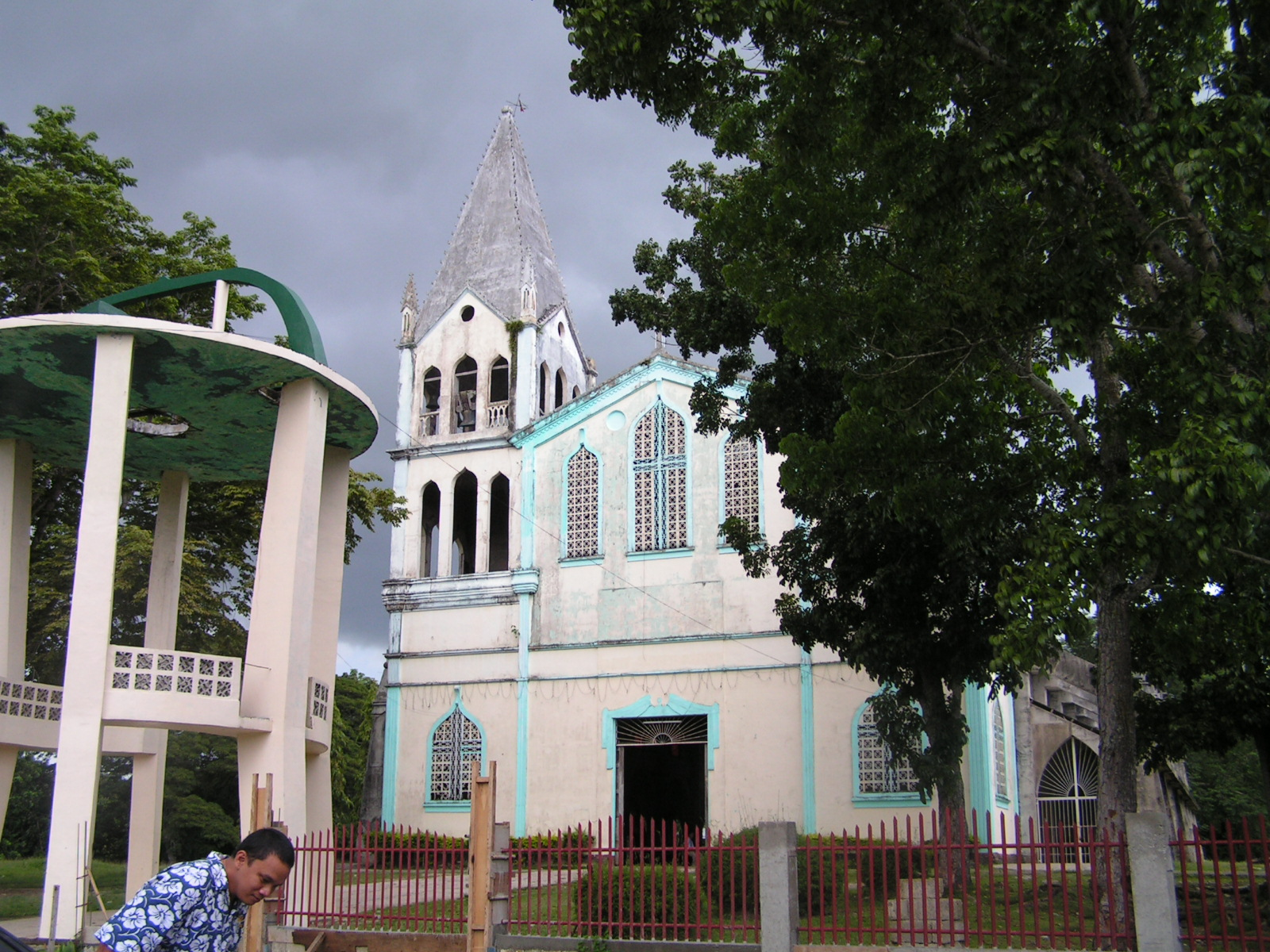
Roman Catholic church, Candijay, Bohol

The municipality of Candijay was established in 1879 together with its establishment as a separate parish under the Recollects. They left in 1898 because of the change of government but returned at the request of the town and stayed till 1937.

The parish was put under the patronage of Saint Joseph whose feast day is May 19. The present Candijay Church is neogothic in style as evinced by its tower and windows. The church is made of concrete. The church recently added a portico in front.

== Clarin ==
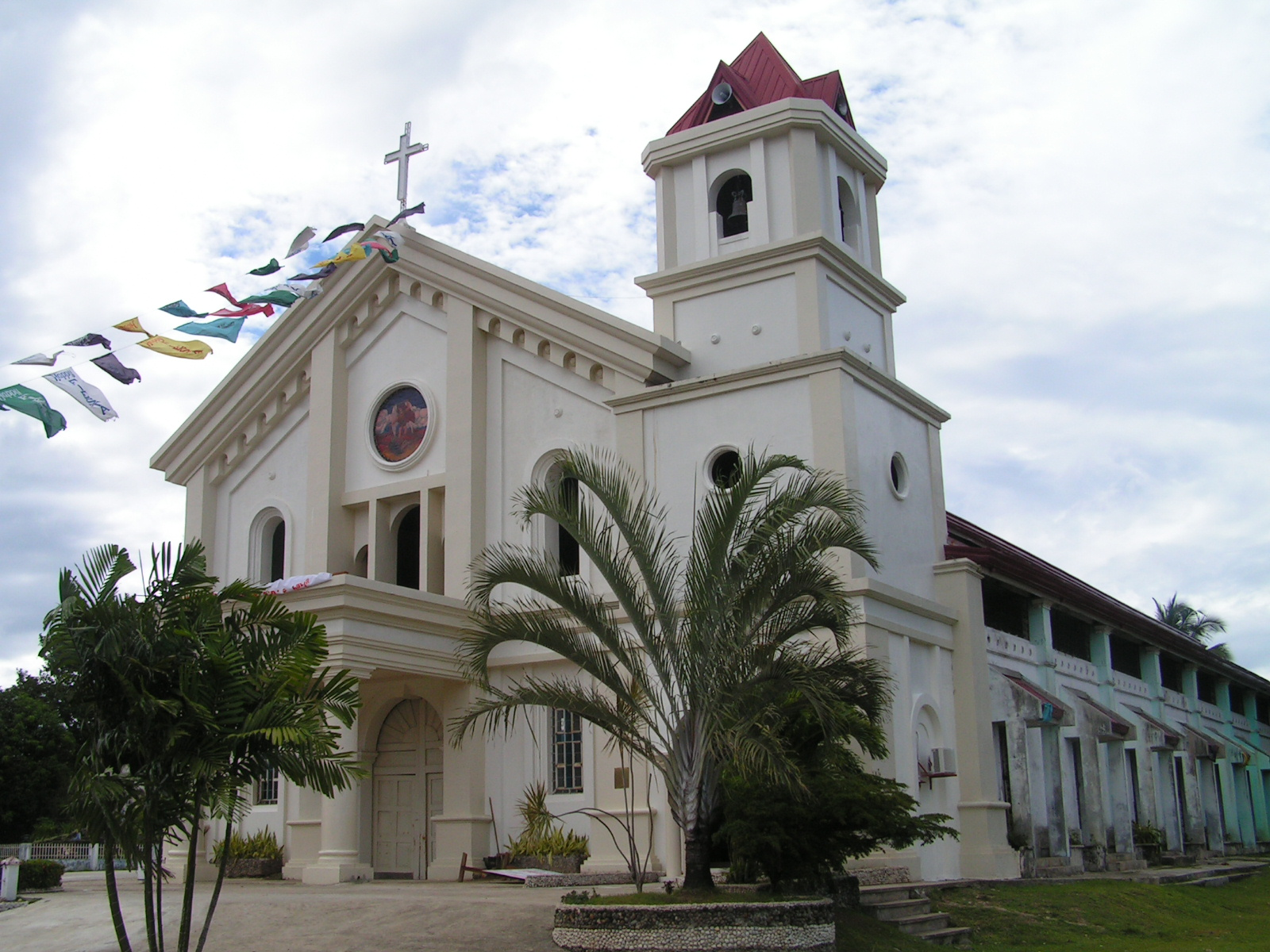
Clarin church prior to the 2013 earthquake

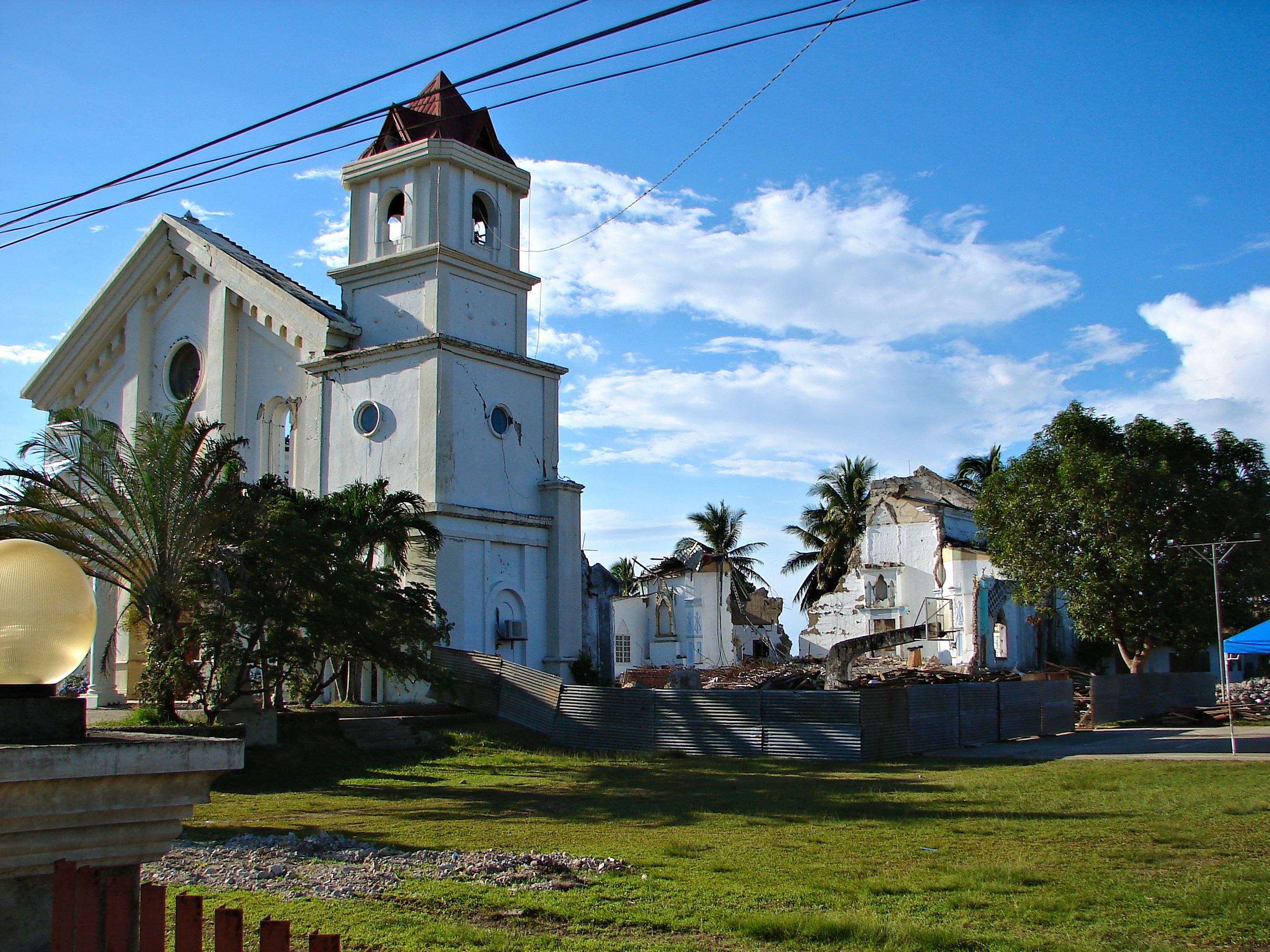
Remnants of the church after the quake

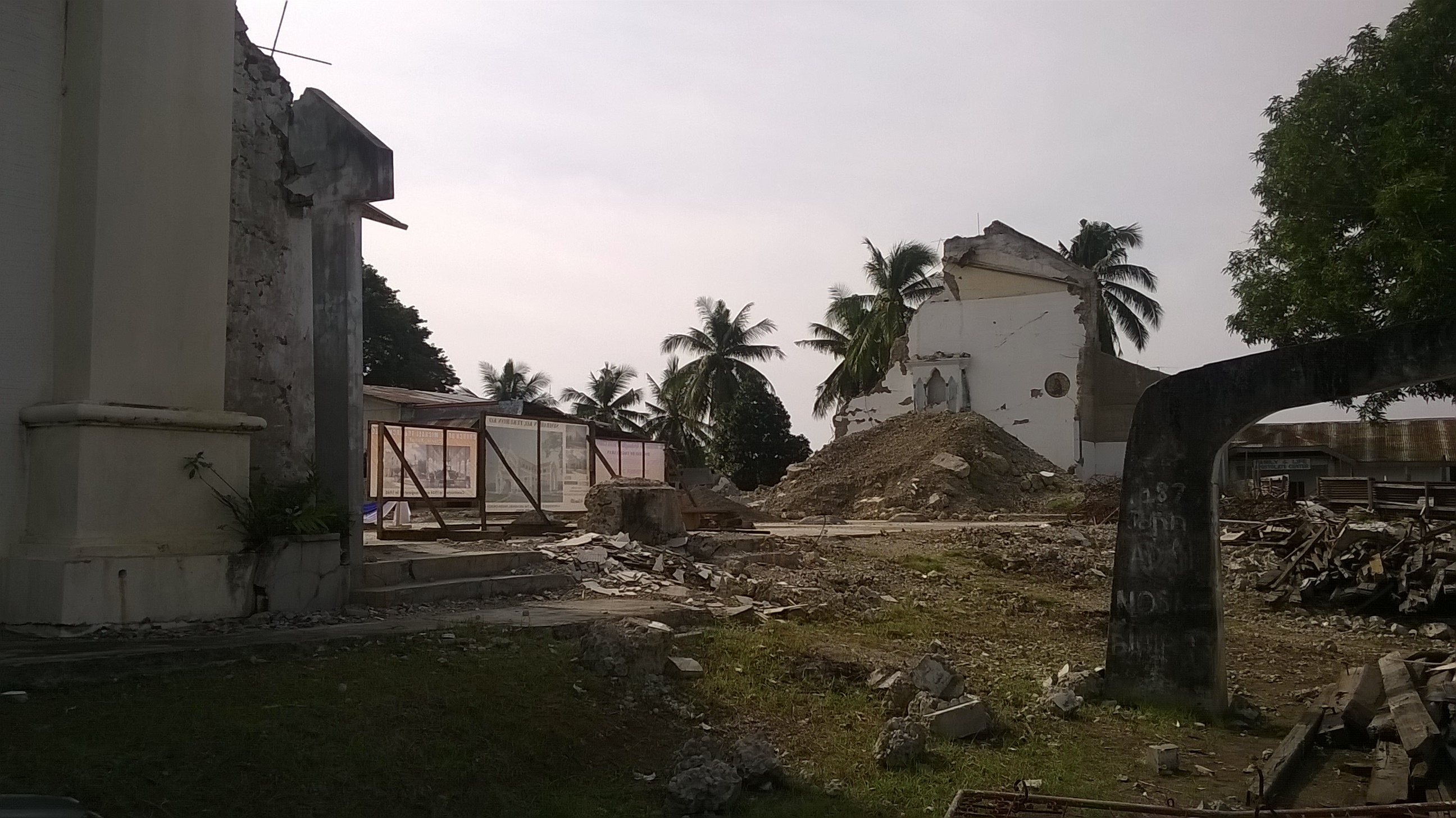
Remains of church post-2013 earthquake, Clarin Bohol

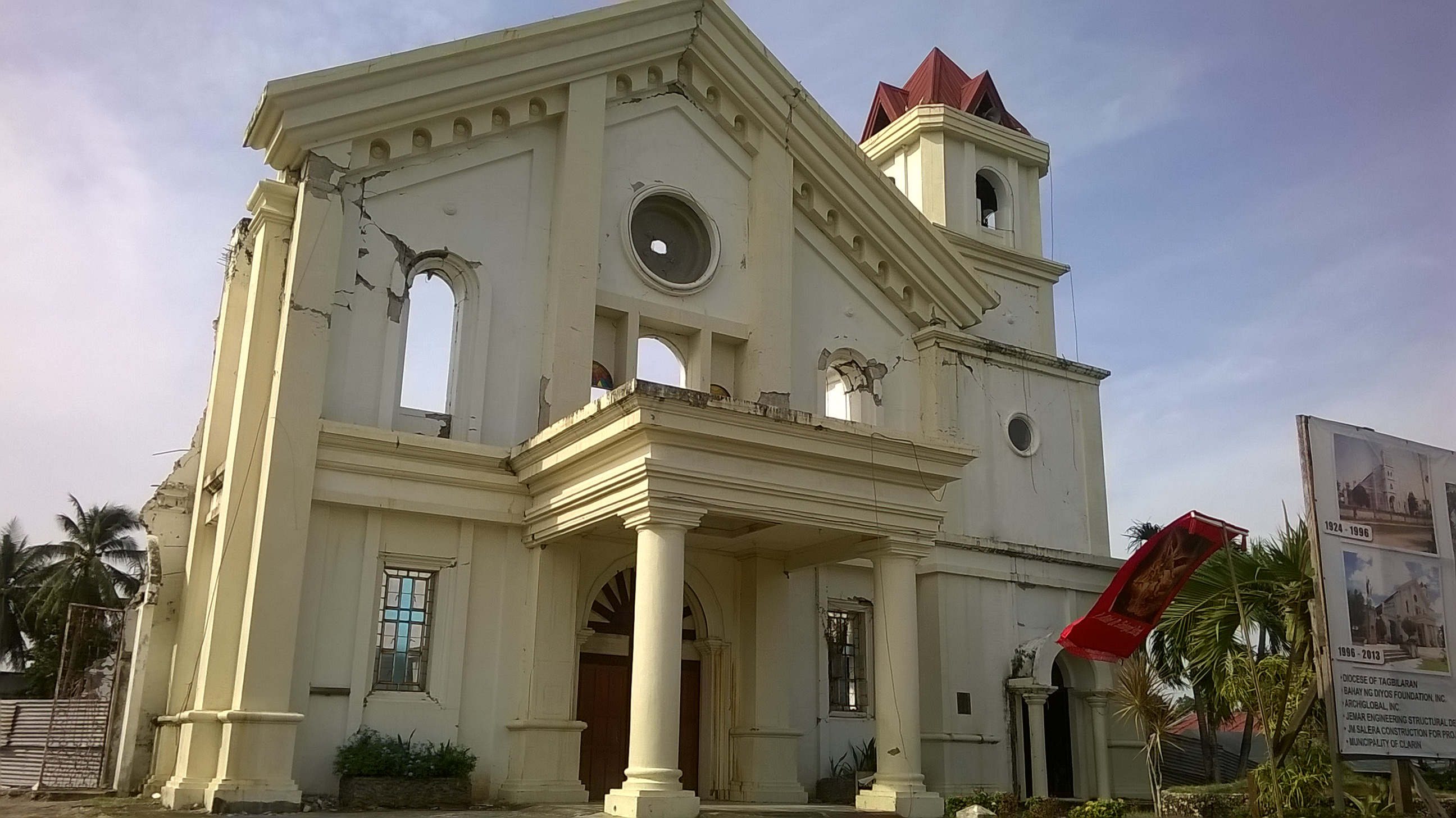
Remains of church post-2013 earthquake, Clarin Bohol

During the 2013 Bohol earthquake, the church of Clarin again collapsed leaving just the recently built bell tower and façade.

== Corella ==
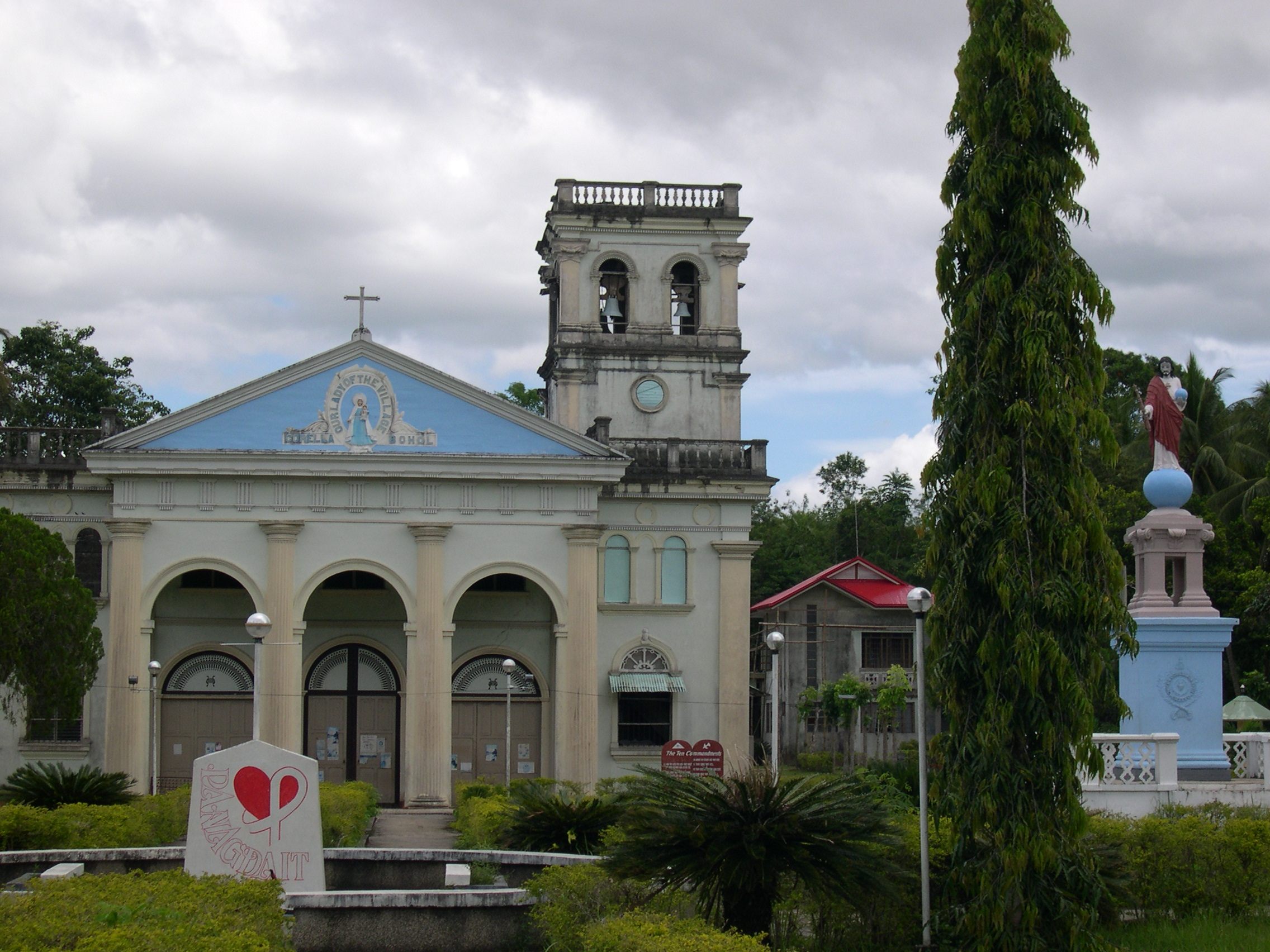
Roman Catholic church, Corella, Bohol

Corella Church

The municipality of Corella was established in 1884 and was named after the town of Corella in the province of Navarre, Spain. The parish of Corella was established by the Recollects led by Fr. Jose Cabanas. Its first parish priest, Fr. Felix Guillen, started the construction of a stone church in 1884. The church was dedicated to Nuestra Señora Del Villar (Our Lady of Villar), who is also the patron saint of Corella, Spain. The church was completed in 1886 under Fr. Nemesio Llorente. The convent and two stone school buildings were constructed under the direction of successive priests. The feast day of Nuestra Señora Del Villar of Corella, Bohol is 27 April, while in Corella, Spain, it is 15 days after Easter. The people of Corella are predominantly conservative Roman Catholic. Through the years the church became dilapidated, and a new church was constructed in the year 1924 with the help of all parishioners.

== Cortes ==
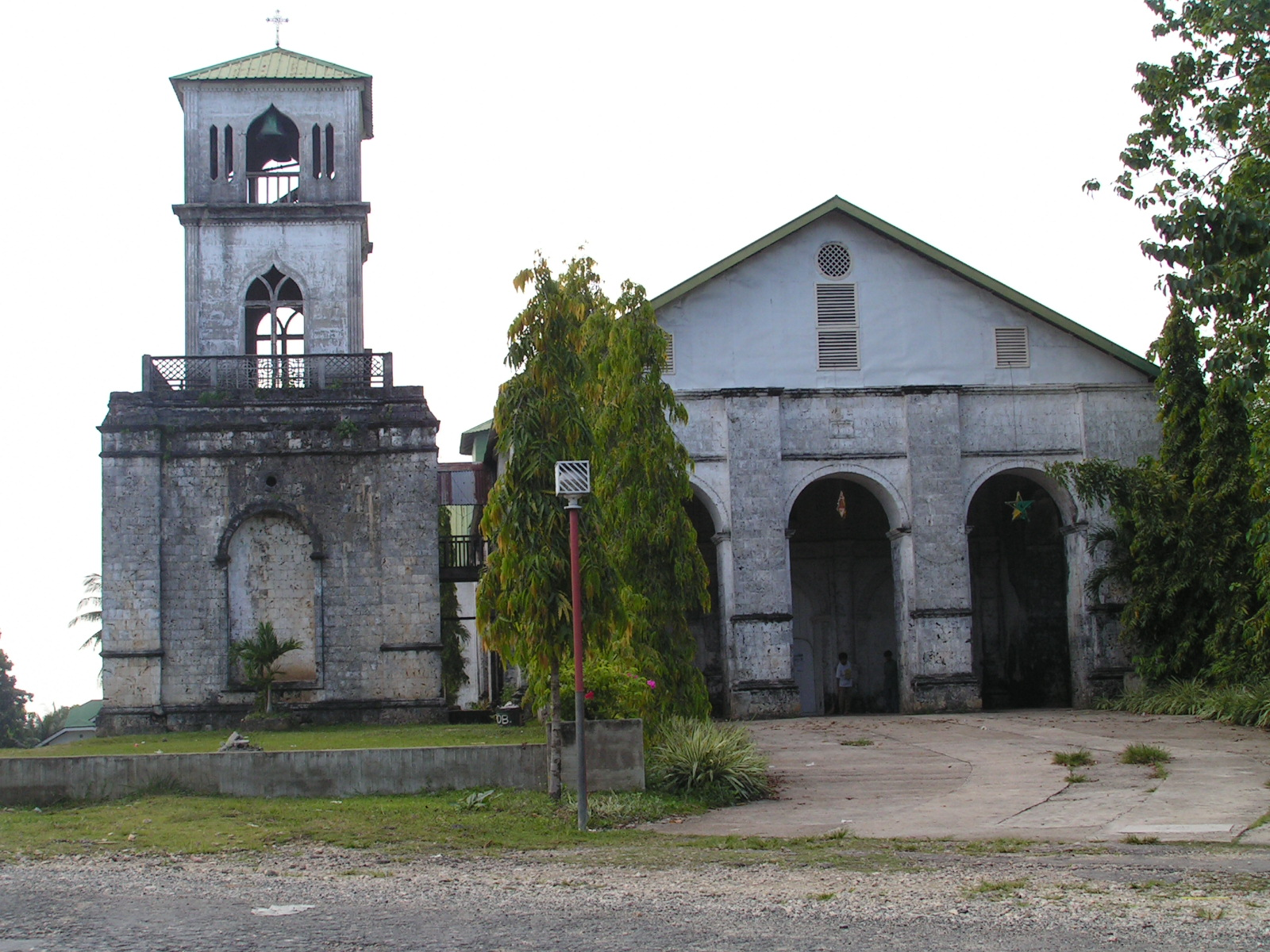
Roman Catholic church, Cortes, Bohol

Cortes Church

== Dauis ==
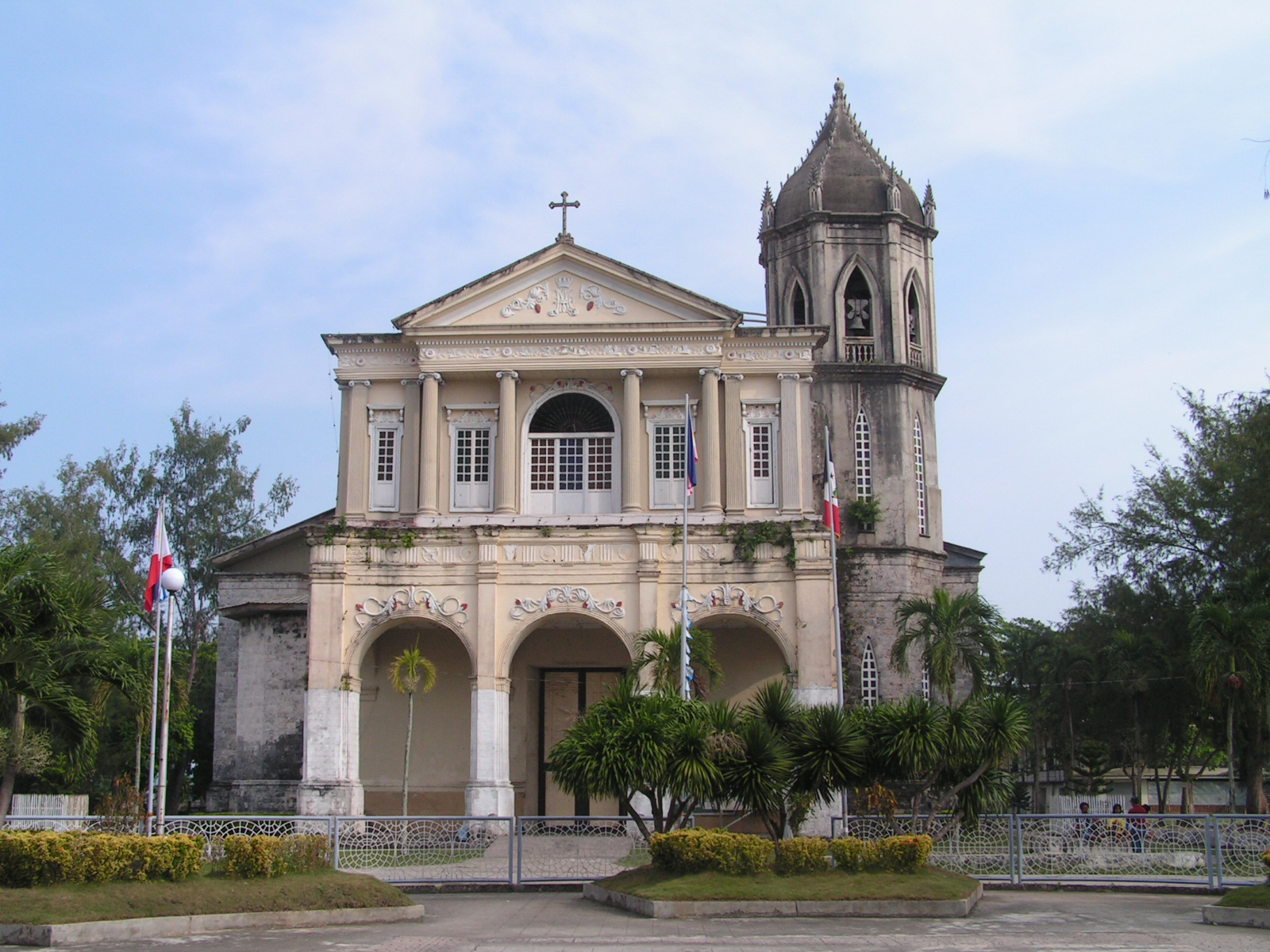
Roman Catholic Church, Dauis, Bohol

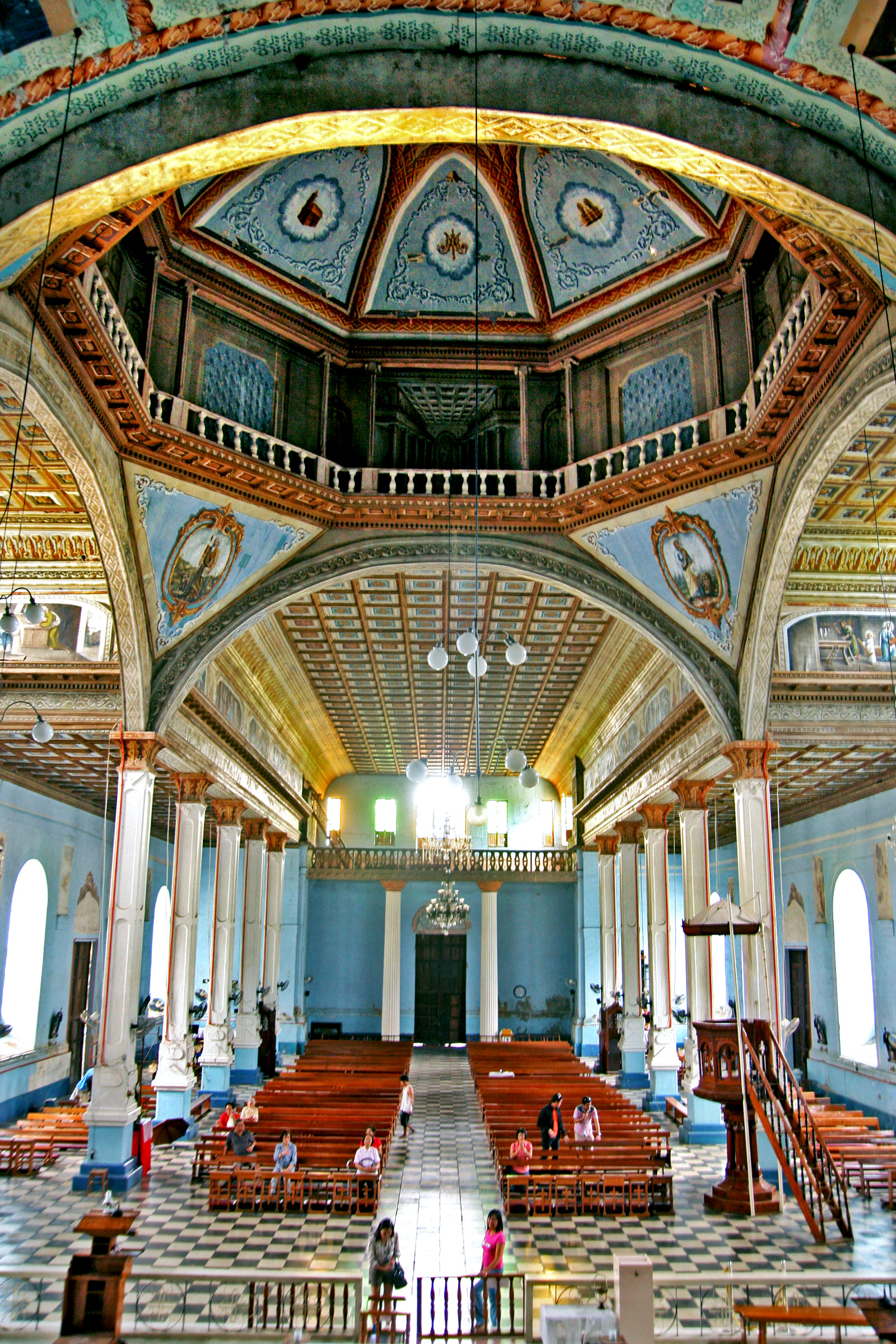
Interior of Our Lady of Assumption Church in Dauis, Bohol, showing some of the fresco work of Ray Francia

The Dauis church has retained its Spanish architecture although it has a semi-modern façade. Its façade and portico collapsed during the 2013 Bohol earthquake.

Media related to Dauis Church at Wikimedia Commons

== Dimiao ==
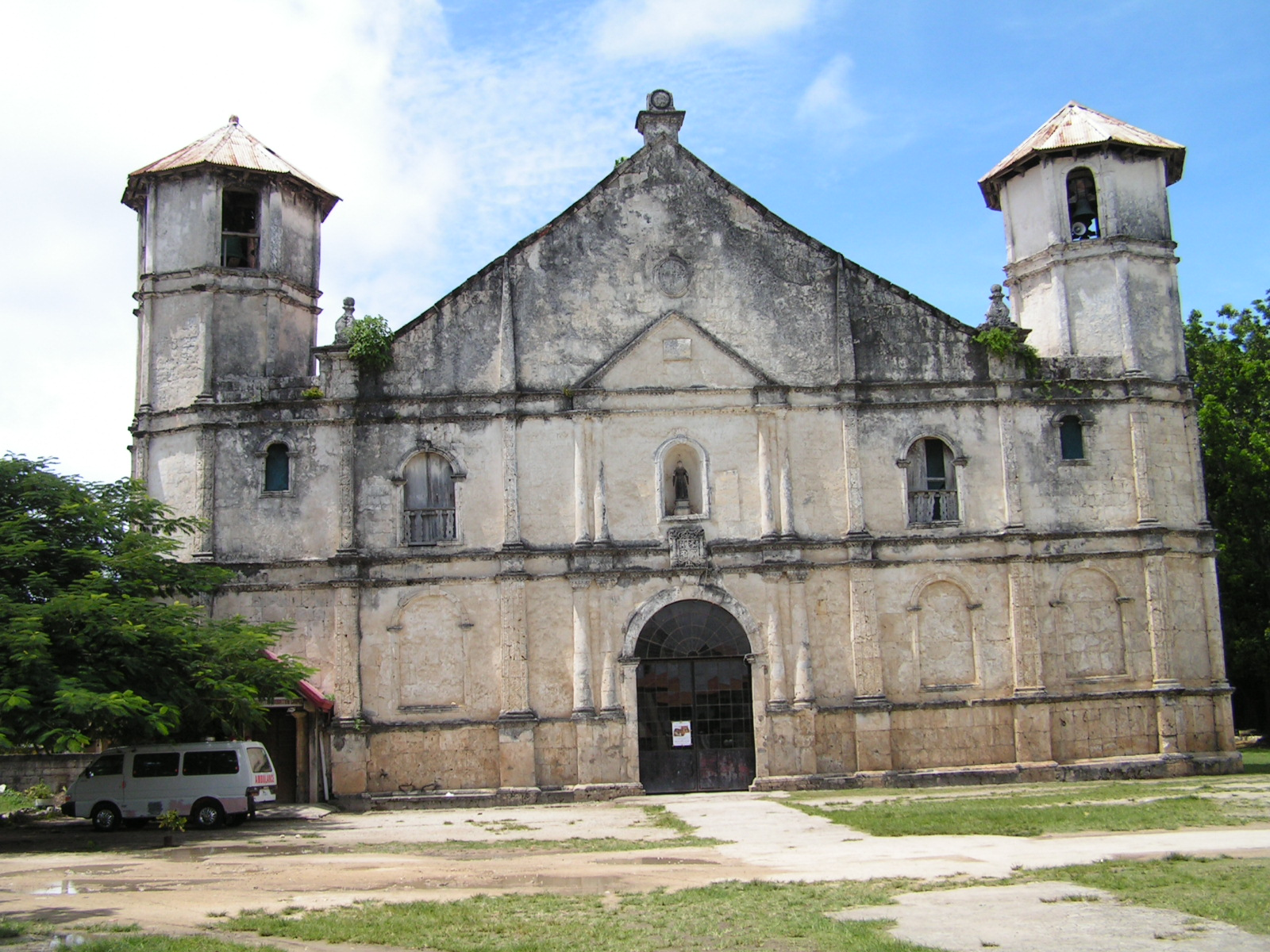
Roman Catholic Church, Dimiao, Bohol

Following the Bohol quake of 2013, the church received heavy cracks, displacing the ceiling of the church with a possibility of collapsing. The walls of both the left and right wings of the transept cracked open, and large portions of the outer stone finishes in various areas of the church exterior fell down. As of early 2014, the structure is still left standing unsafe and untouched by the local residents, only priests and authorities of the church convent are allowed to enter the severely damaged church.

== Duero ==
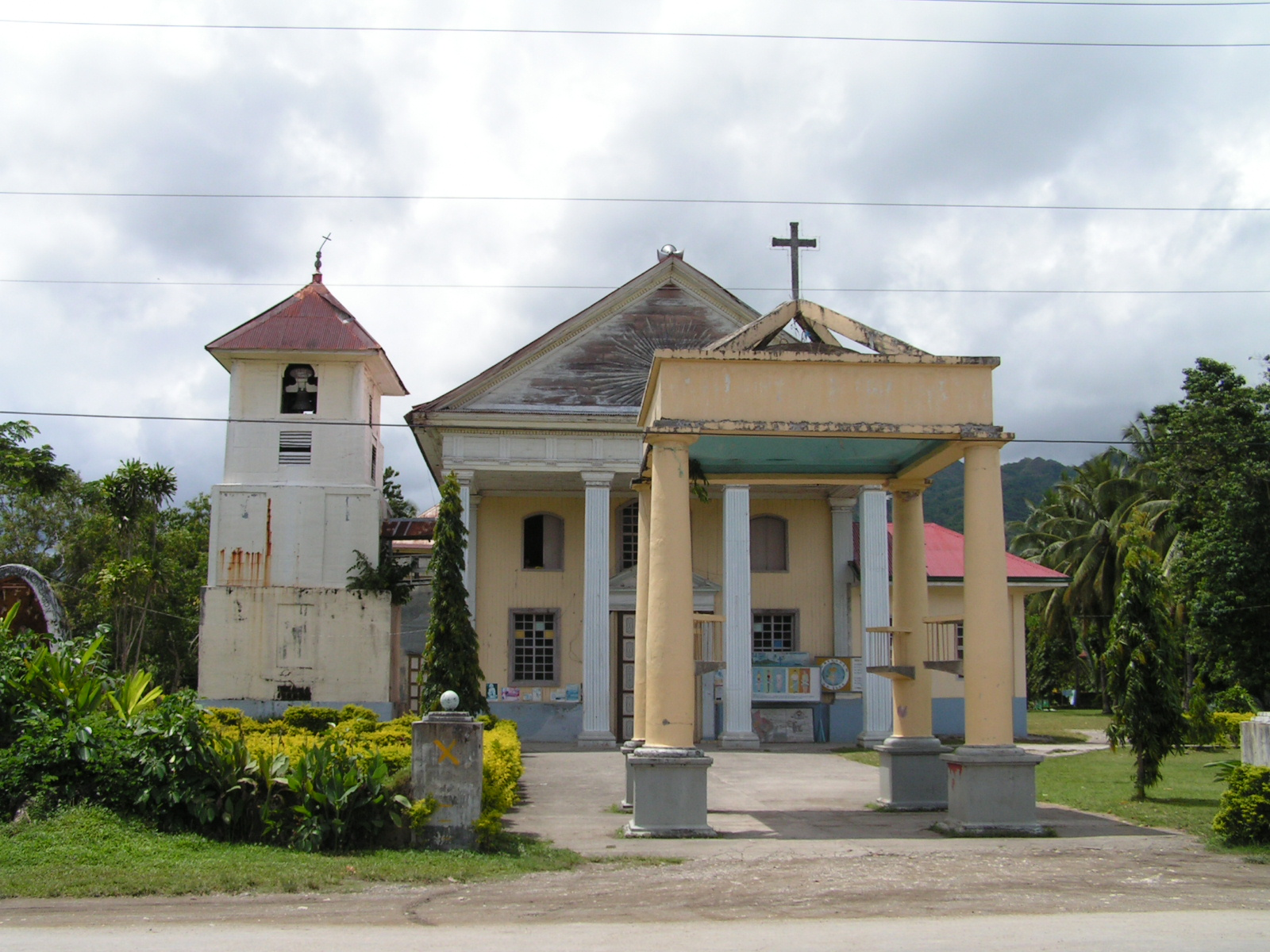
Roman Catholic church, Duero, Bohol

== Garcia Hernandez ==
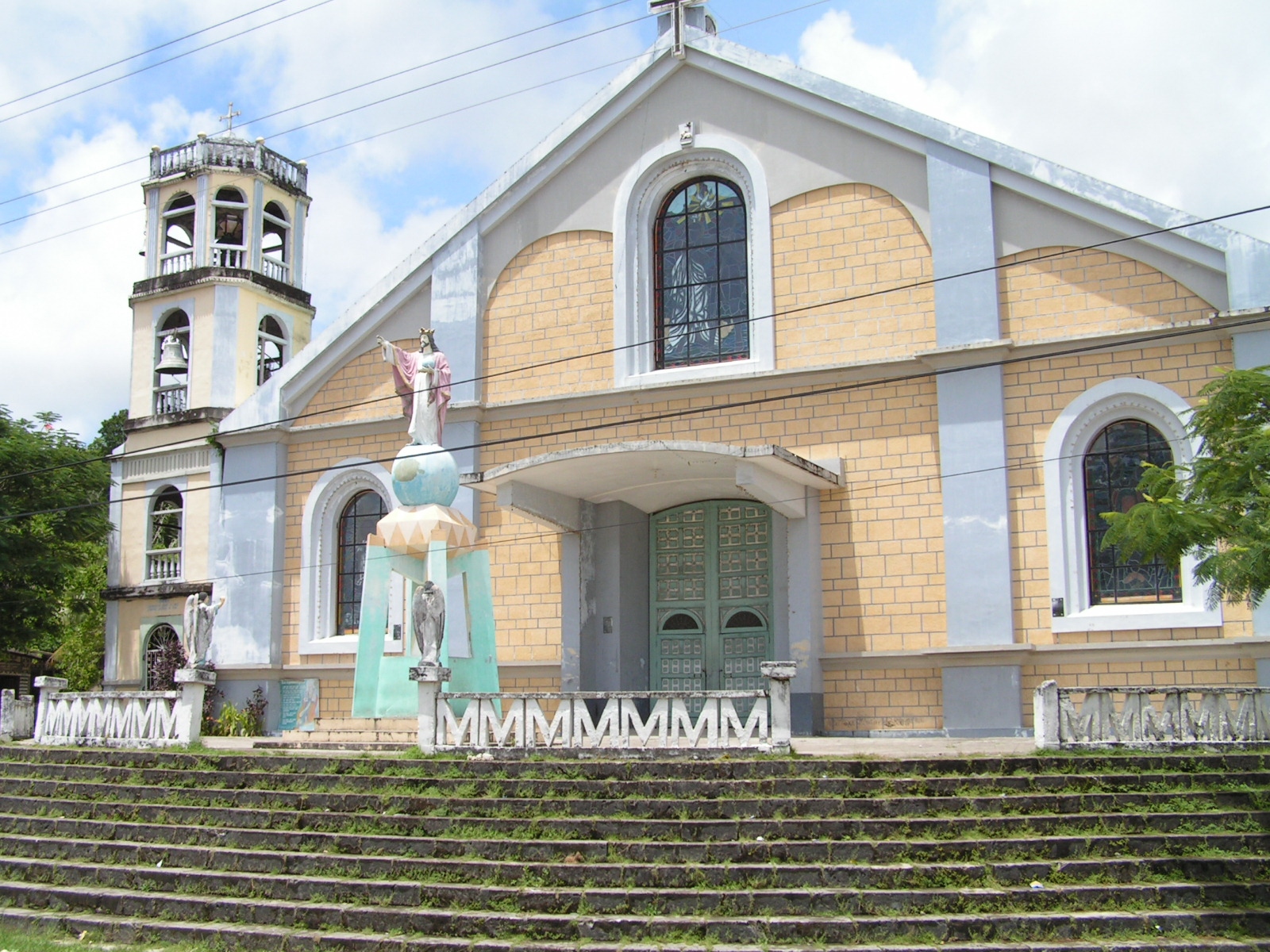
Roman Catholic church, Garcia Hernandez, Bohol

== Guindulman ==
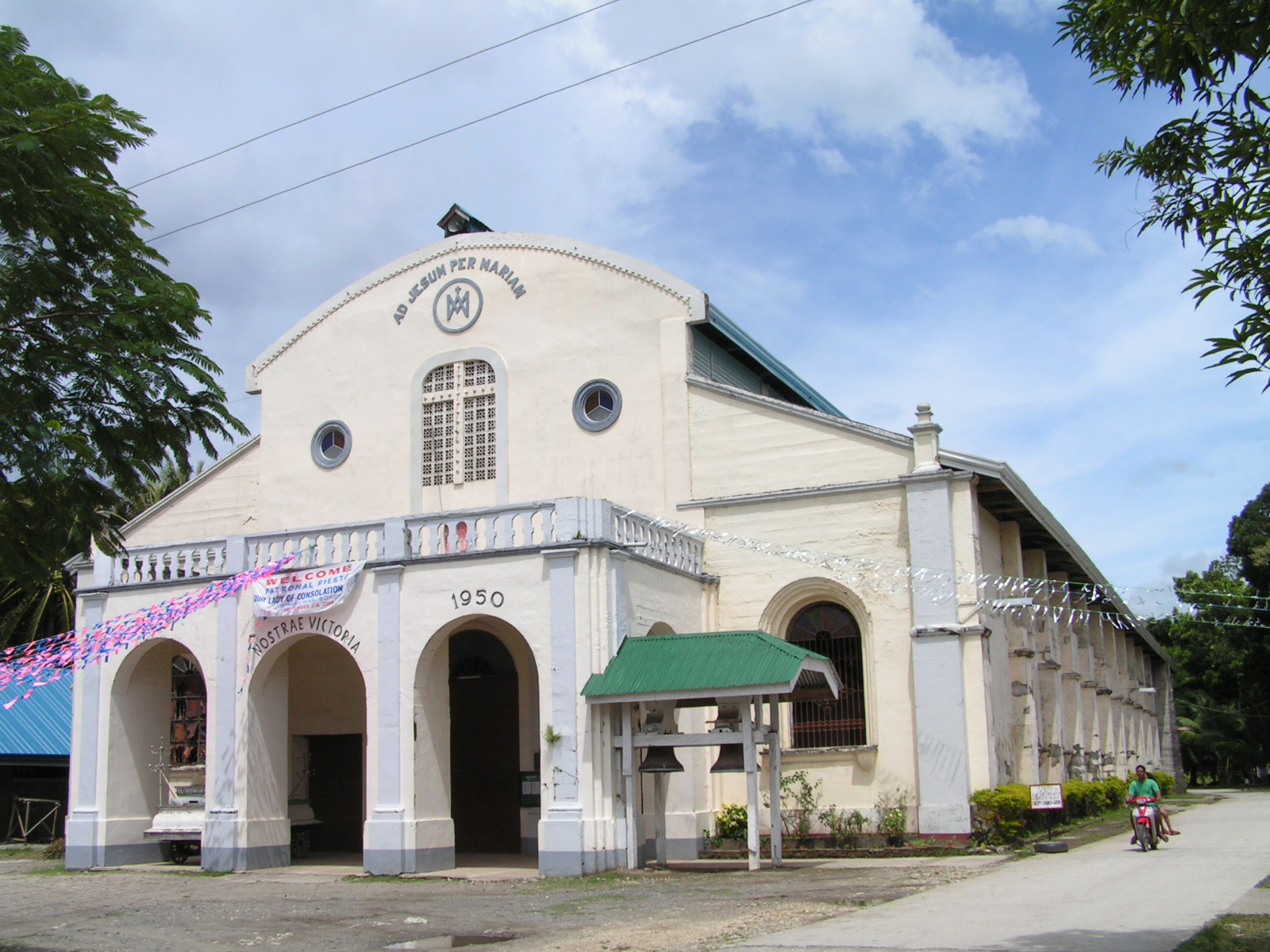
Roman Catholic church, Guindulman, Bohol

== Inabanga ==
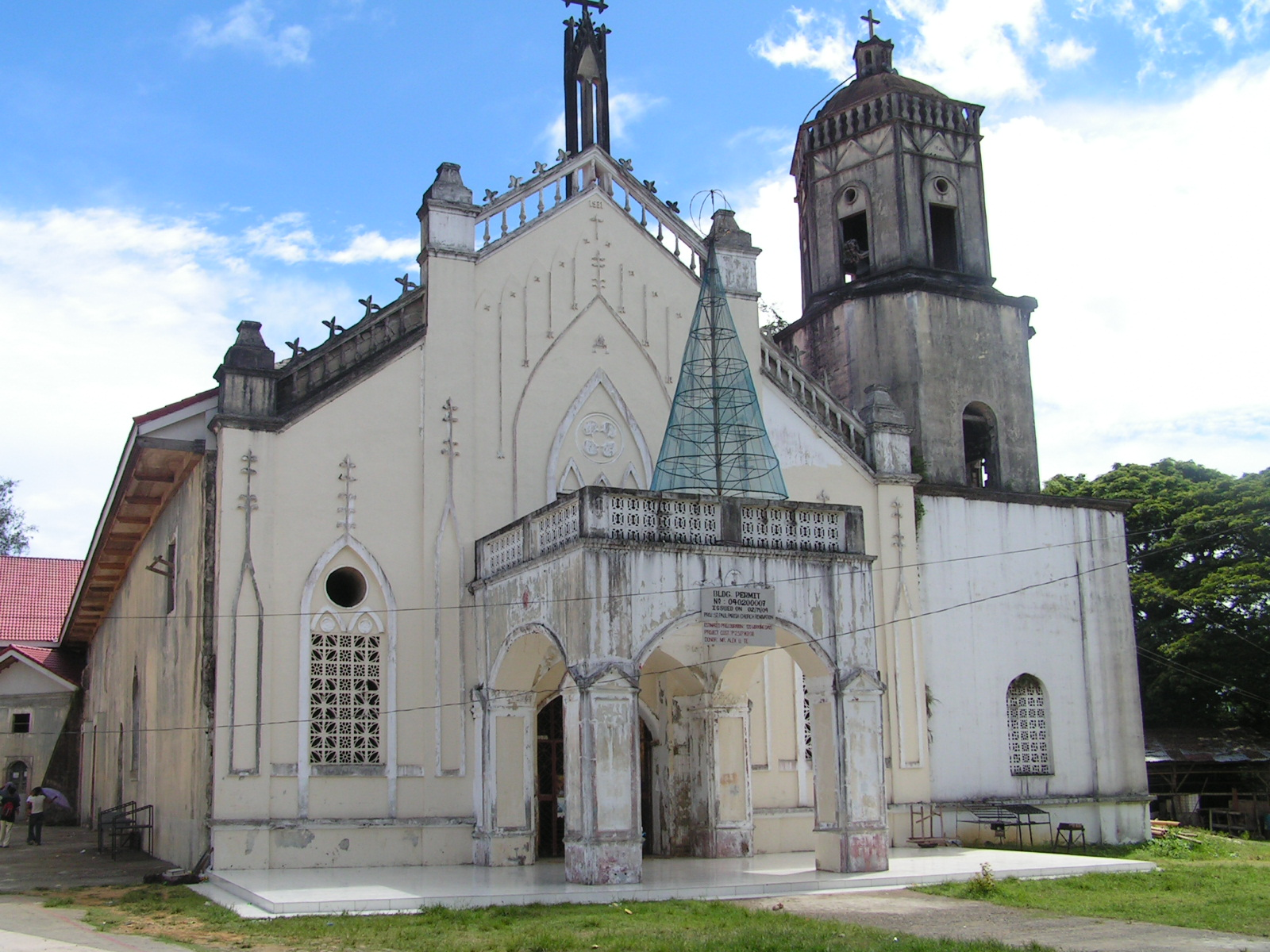
Roman Catholic Church, Inabanga, Bohol

The church of Inabanga was reduced to piles of rubble during the earthquake of October 15, 2013, with only the façade standing. The church's galvanized iron roofing material had earlier been replaced with heavier tile roofing, which is not practical in an earthquake-prone country. The townsfolk blamed the new tile roof for the collapse of the church.

== Jagna ==
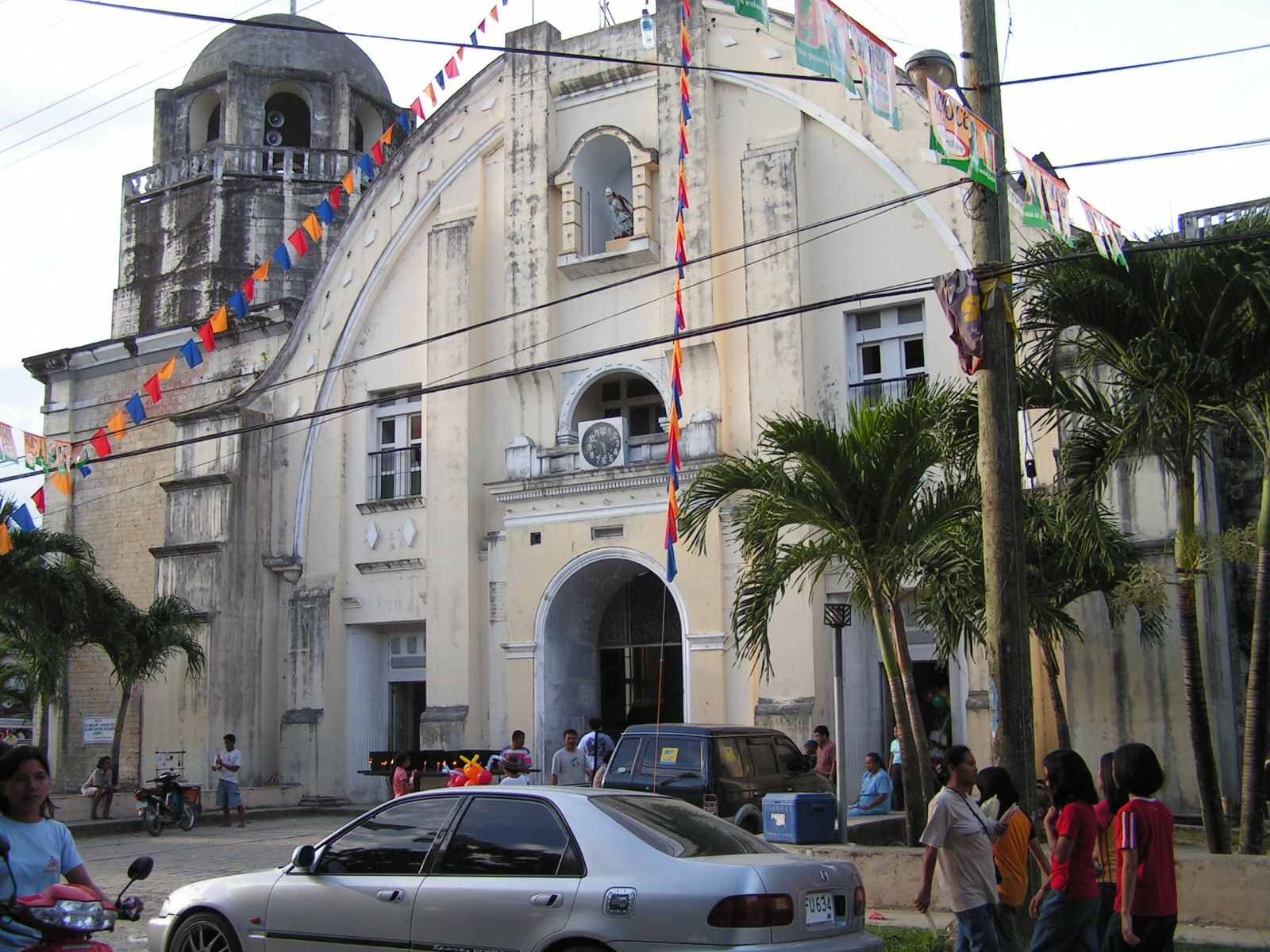
Roman Catholic Church, Jagna, Bohol

== Jetafe ==
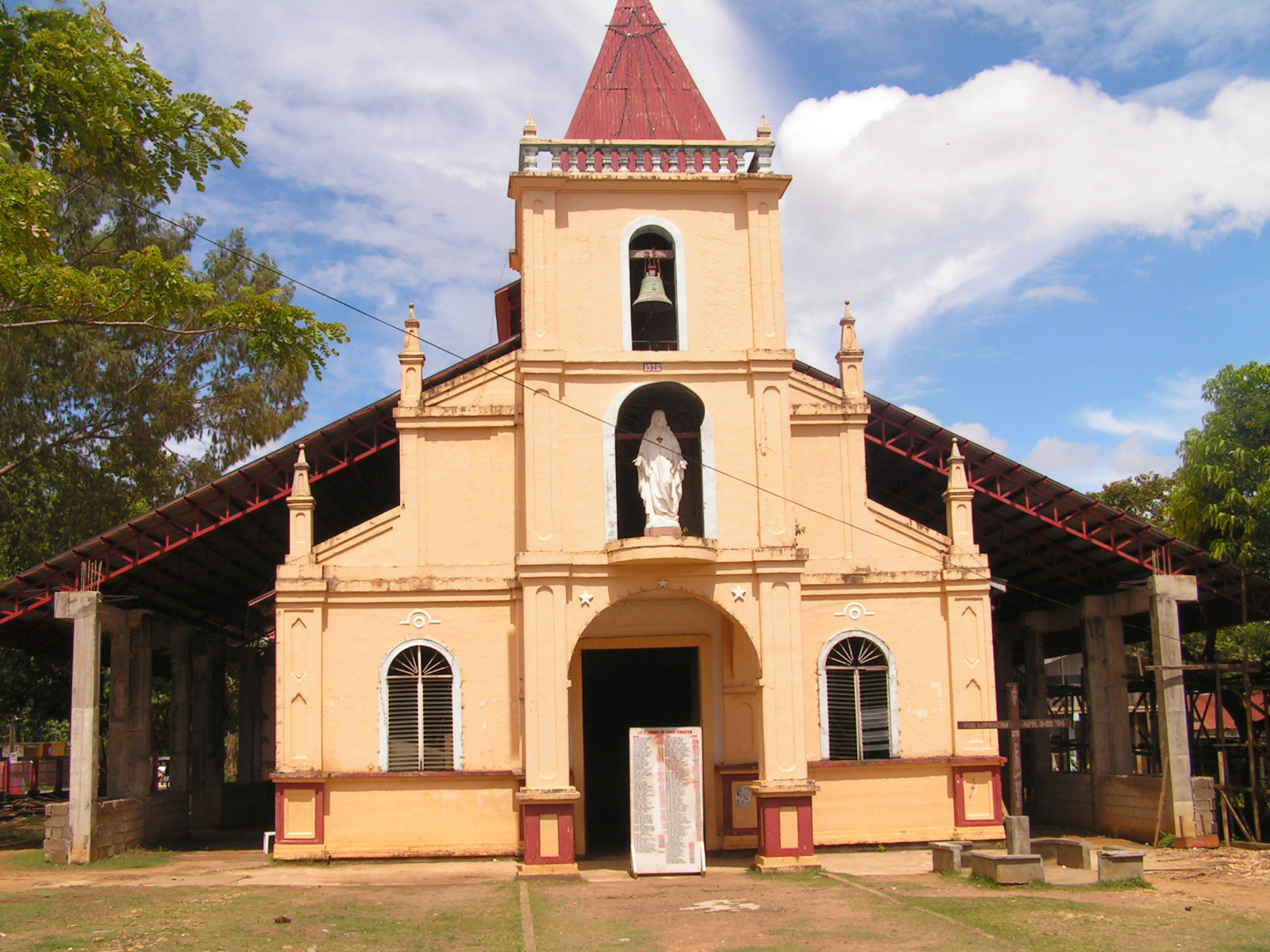
Roman Catholic church, Jetafe, Bohol

== Lila ==
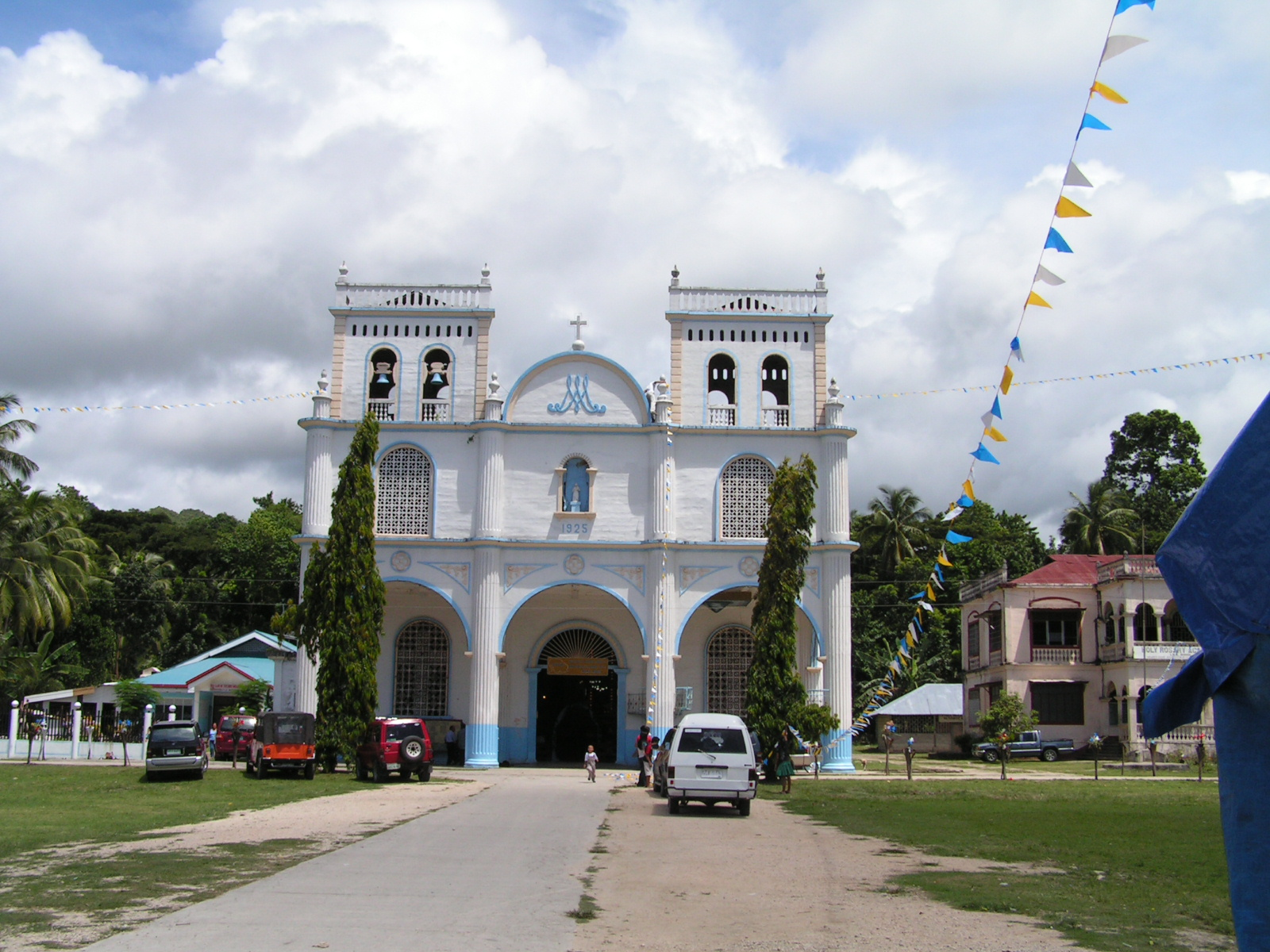
Roman Catholic church, Lila, Bohol

== Loay ==
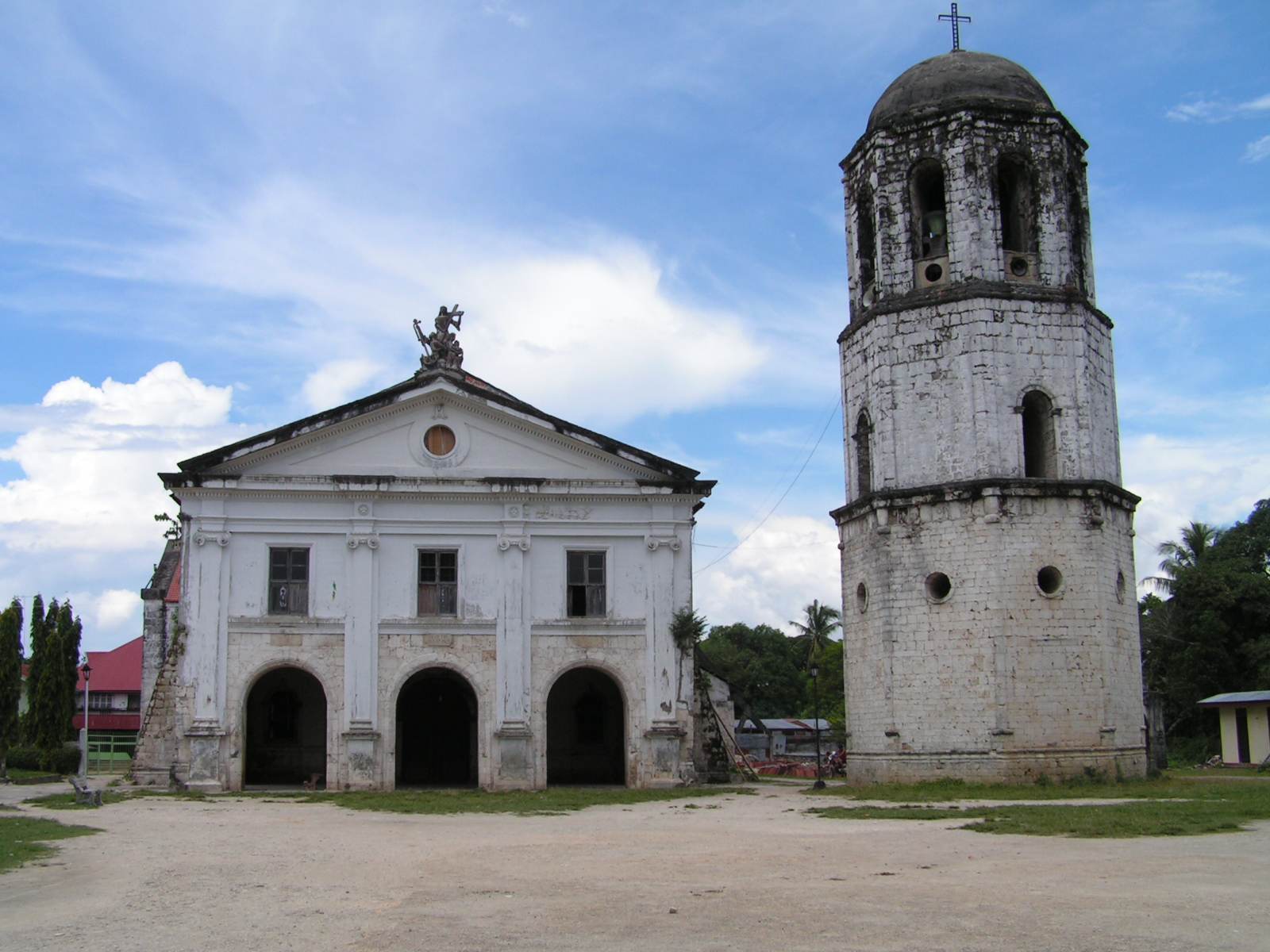
Roman Catholic church, Loay, Bohol

The church of Loay was severely damaged after the 2013 Bohol earthquake; its façade collapsed and the roof caved in.

== Loboc ==
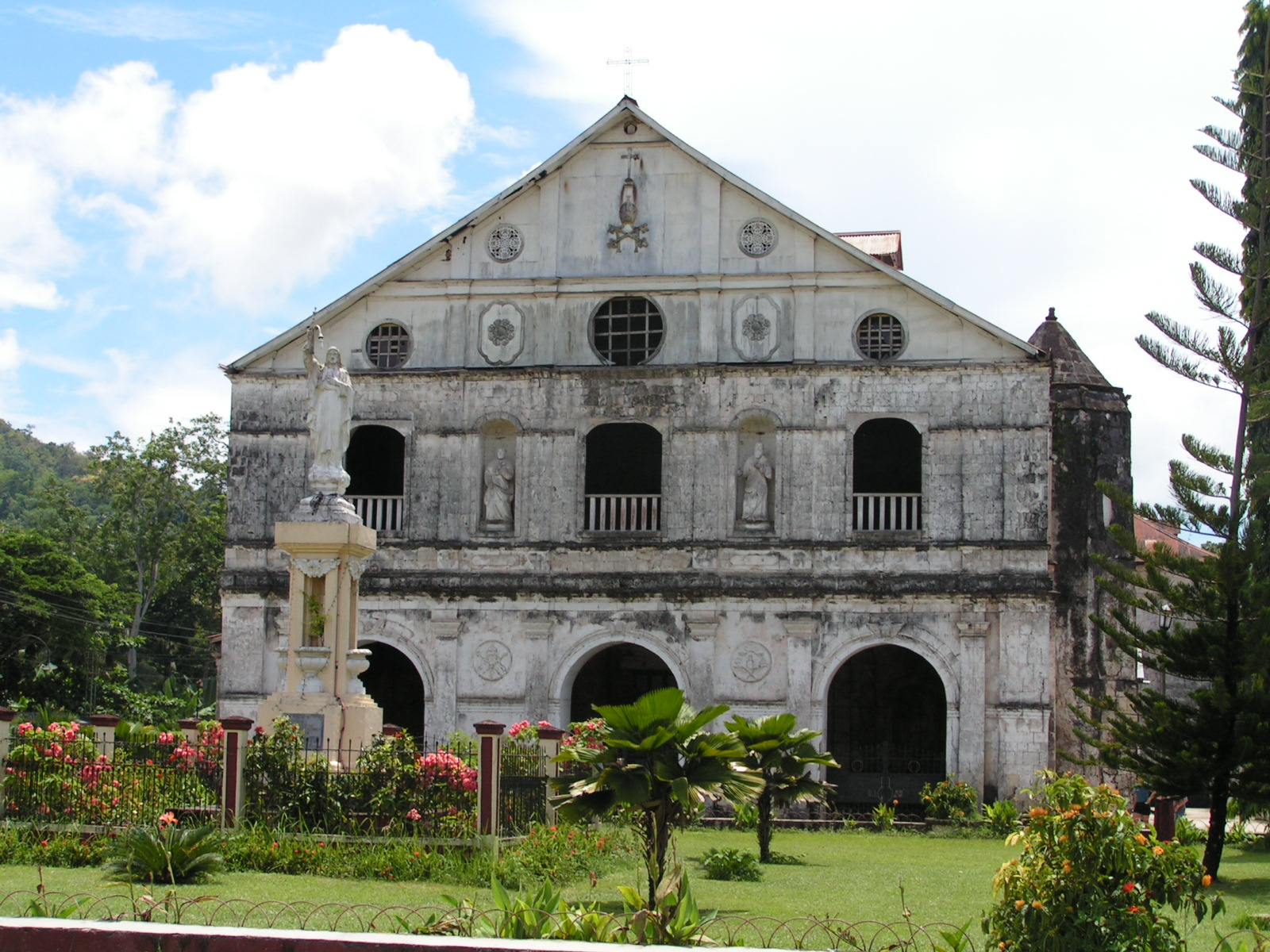
Roman Catholic church, Loboc, Bohol

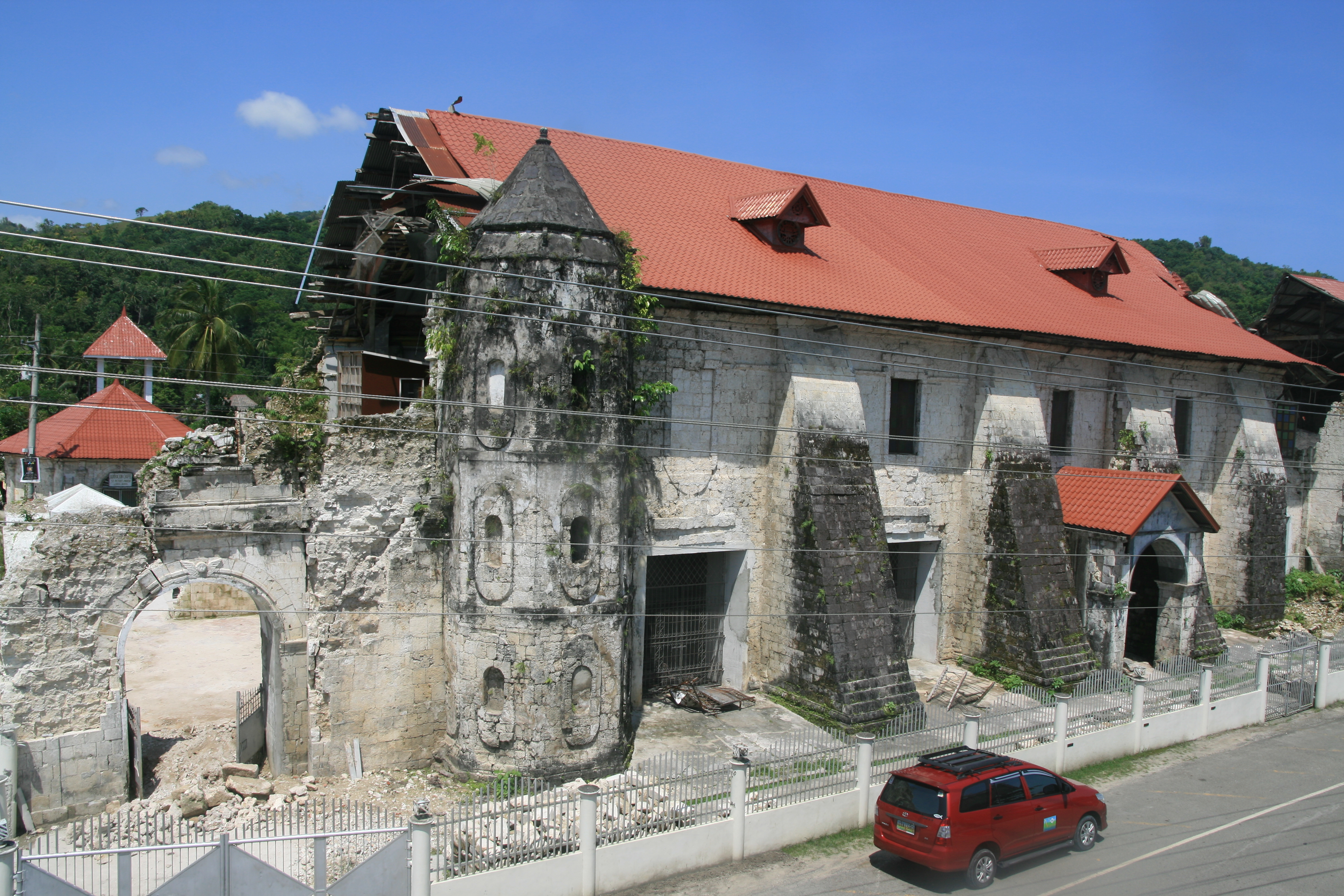
Loboc church post-2013 earthquake

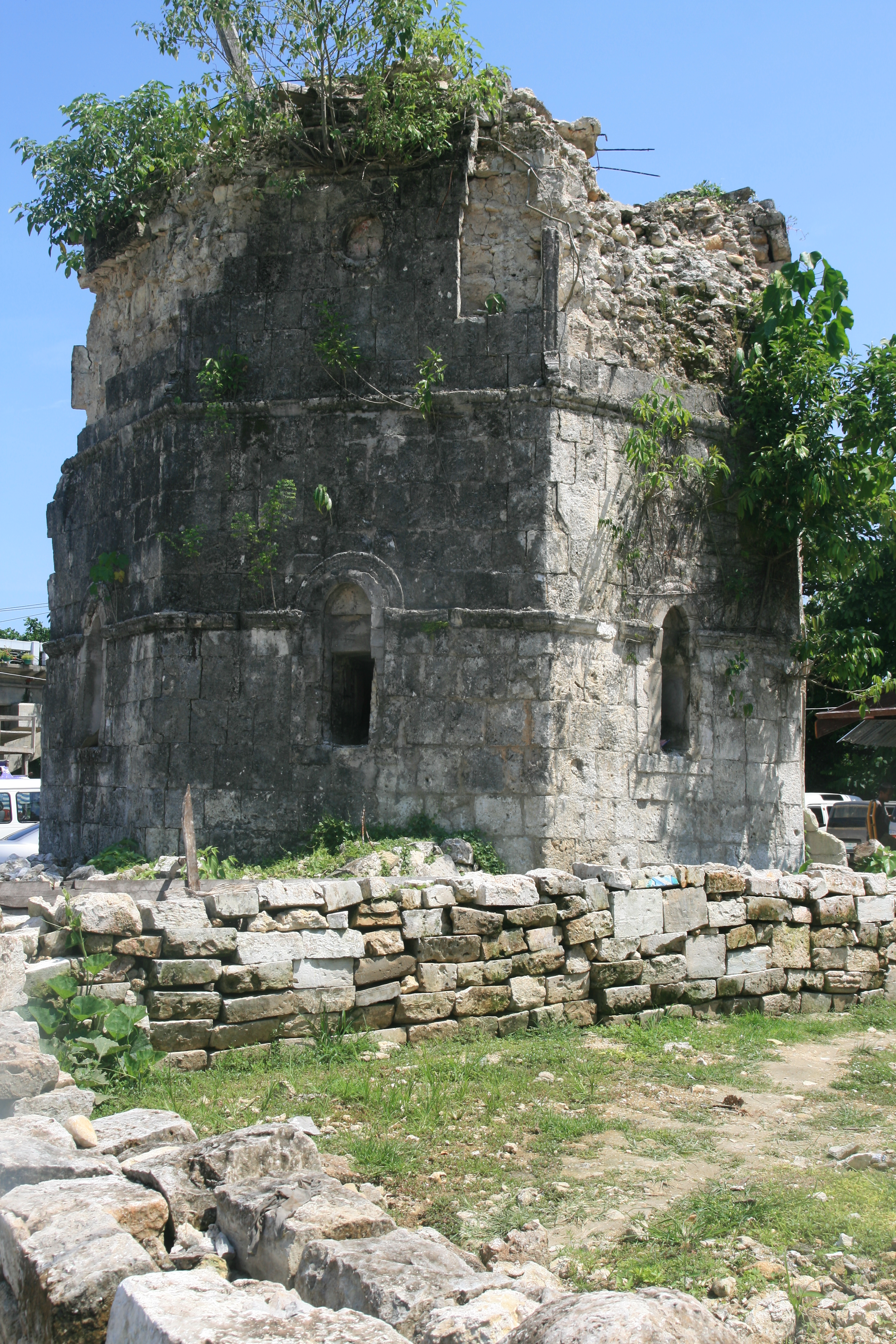
Remains of Loboc church belfry post-2013 earthquake

The façade-portico of Loboc church collapsed during the earthquake of October 15, 2013. Its freestanding church tower also collapsed leaving less than half the tower standing. Media related to San Pedro Church, Loboc at Wikimedia Commons

== Loon ==
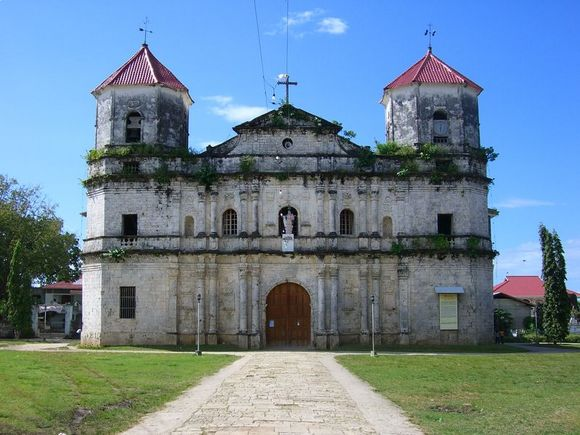
Facade and twin towers of the Roman Catholic church

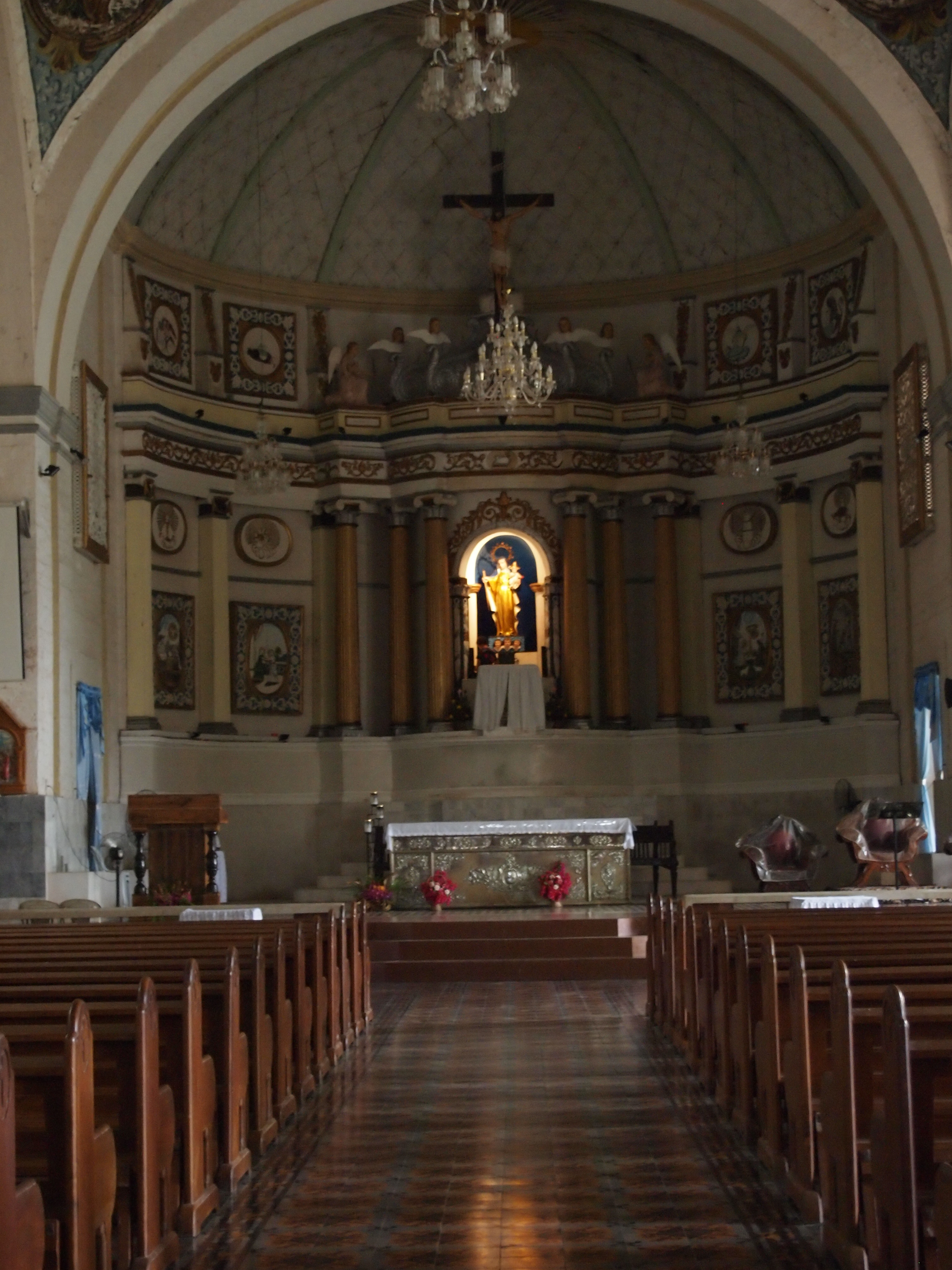
Sanctuary of Loon church

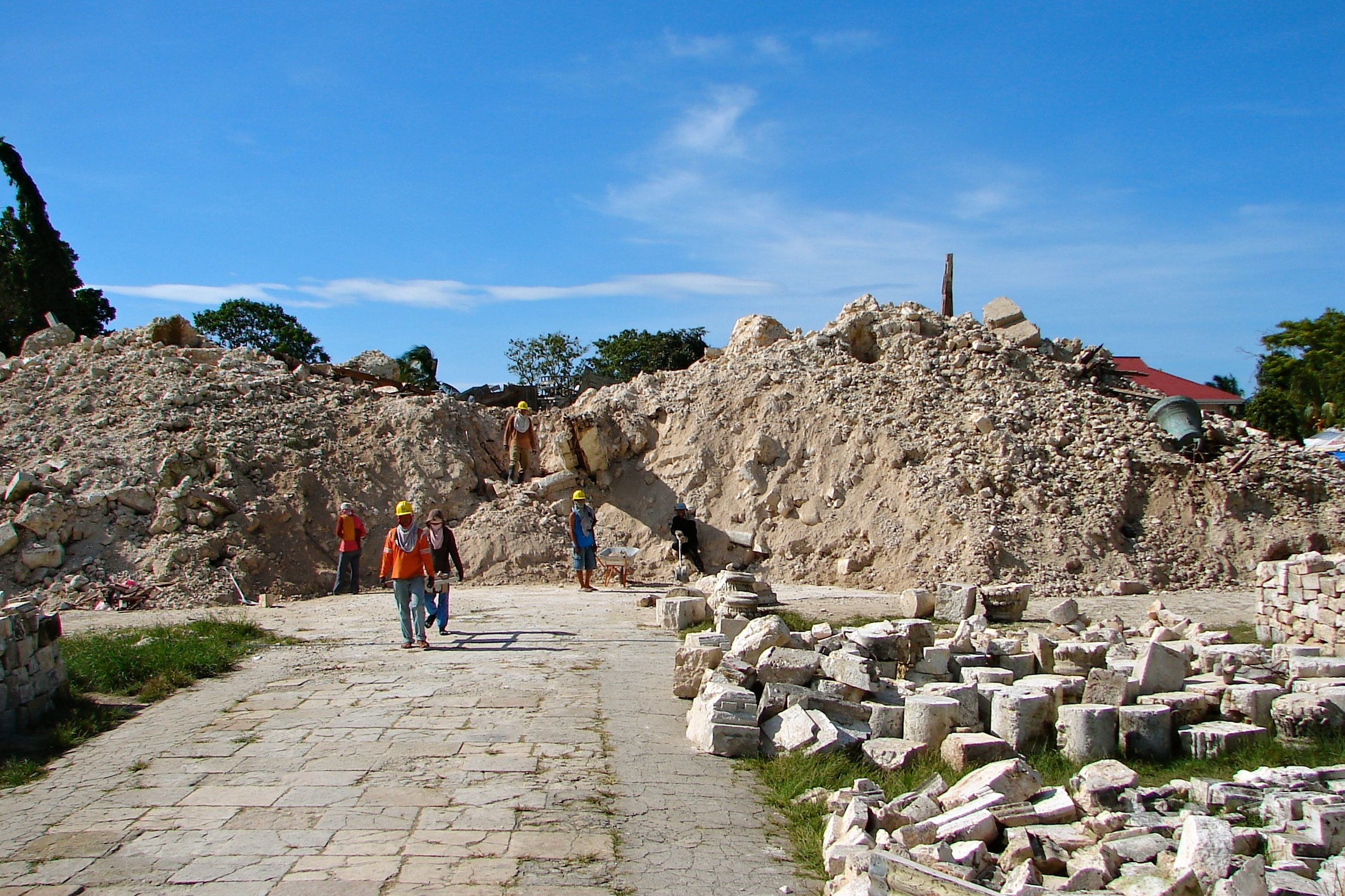
Loon church ruins after the 2013 earthquake

Media related to Loon Church at Wikimedia Commons

== Maribojoc Church ==
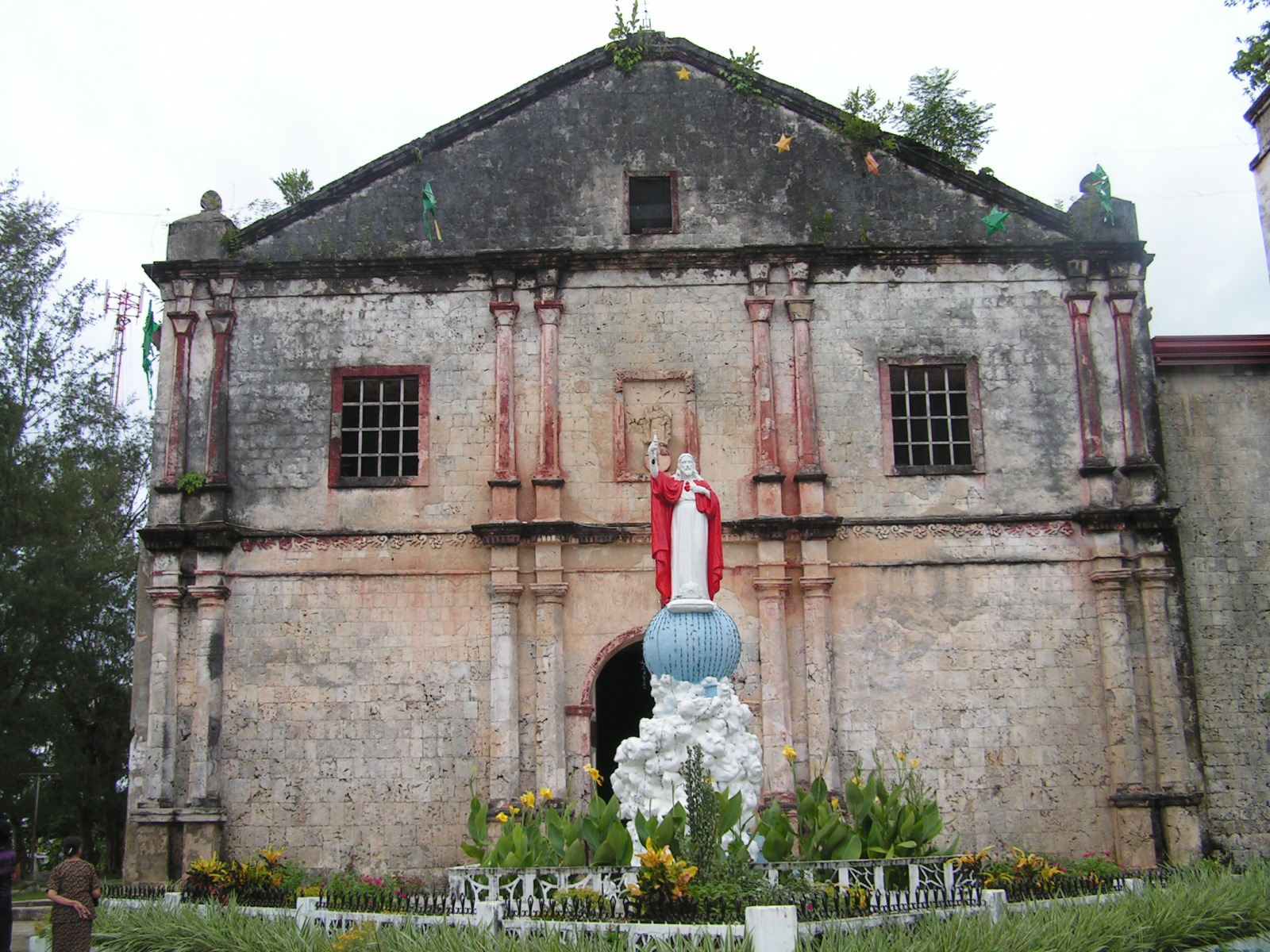
Roman Catholic church, Maribojoc, Bohol

The 1886 Maribojoc church crumbled to the ground entirely during the 2013 Bohol earthquake.

Media related to Maribojoc Church at Wikimedia Commons

== Panglao Church ==
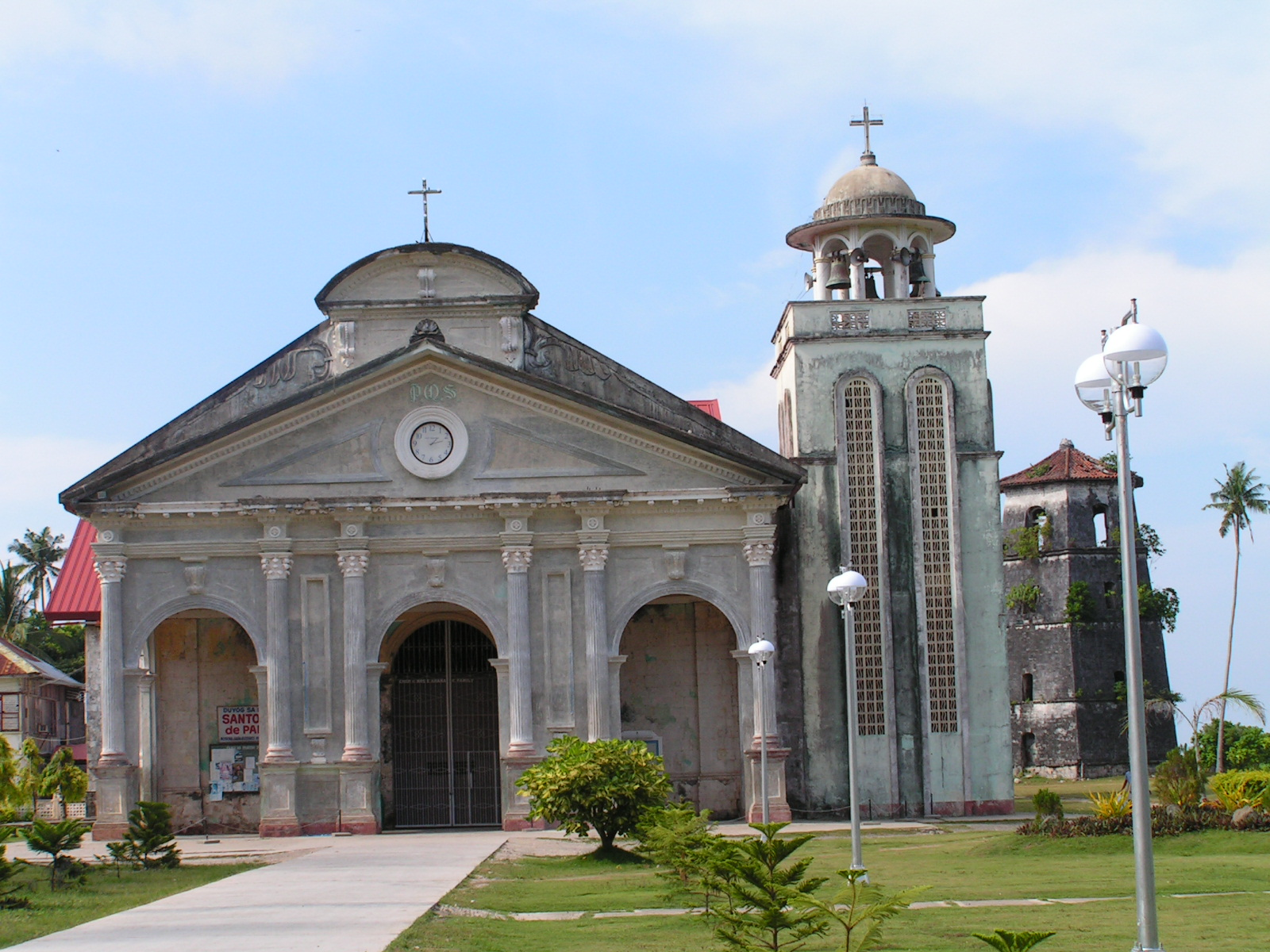
Roman Catholic church, Panglao, Bohol

Media related to Panglao Church at Wikimedia Commons

== Tagbilaran ==
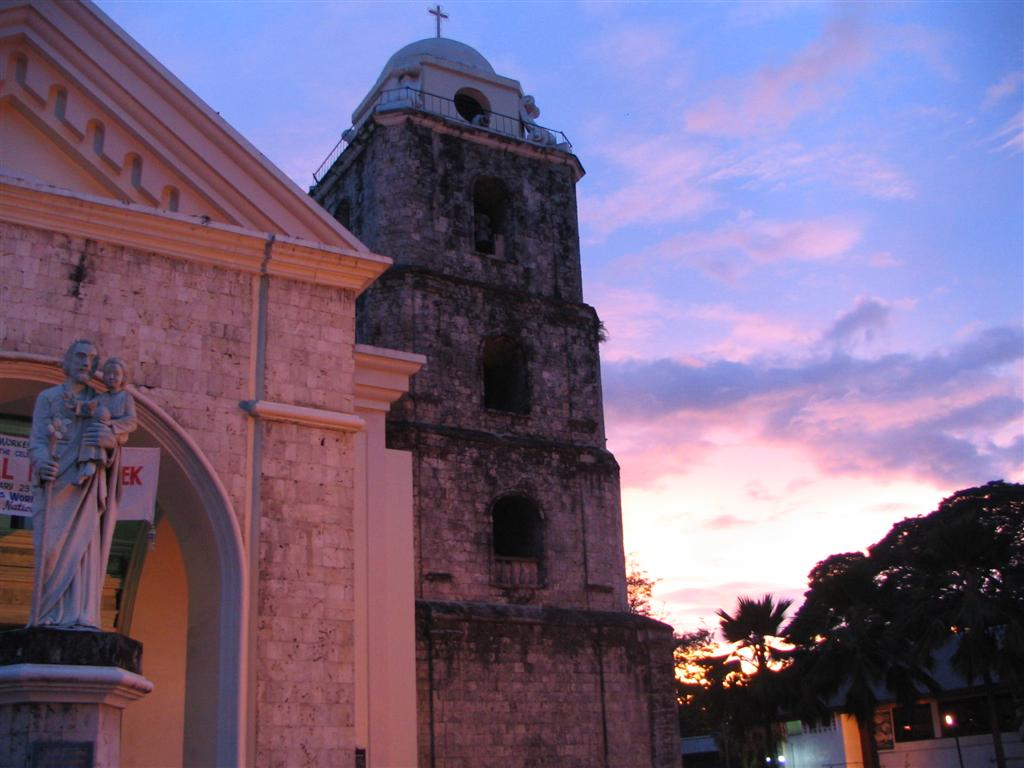
Roman Catholic church, Tagbilaran

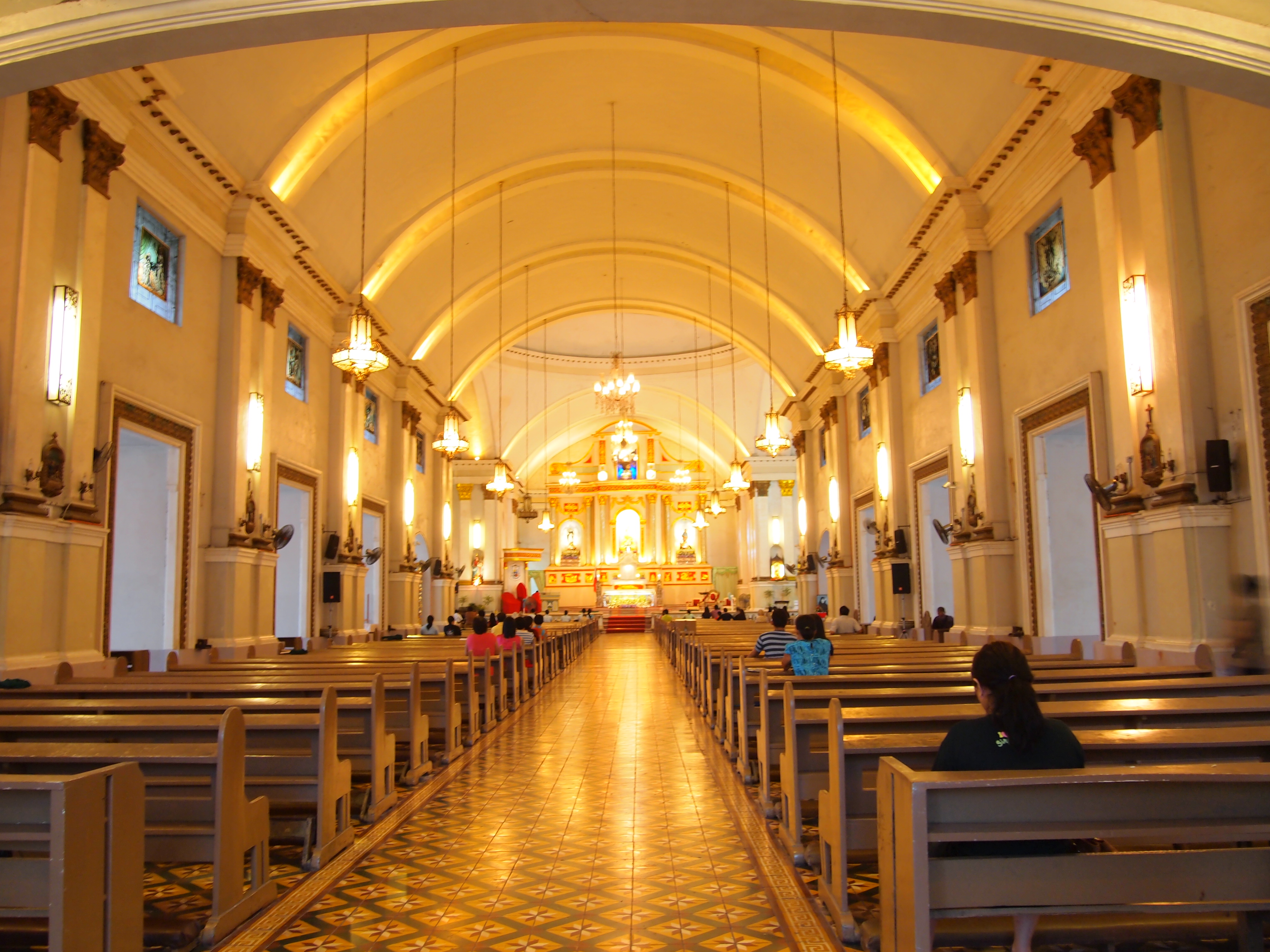
Tagbilaran cathedral Interiors

During the earthquake of 2013, the church was slightly damaged.

Media related to Tagbilaran Cathedral at Wikimedia Commons

== Talibon ==
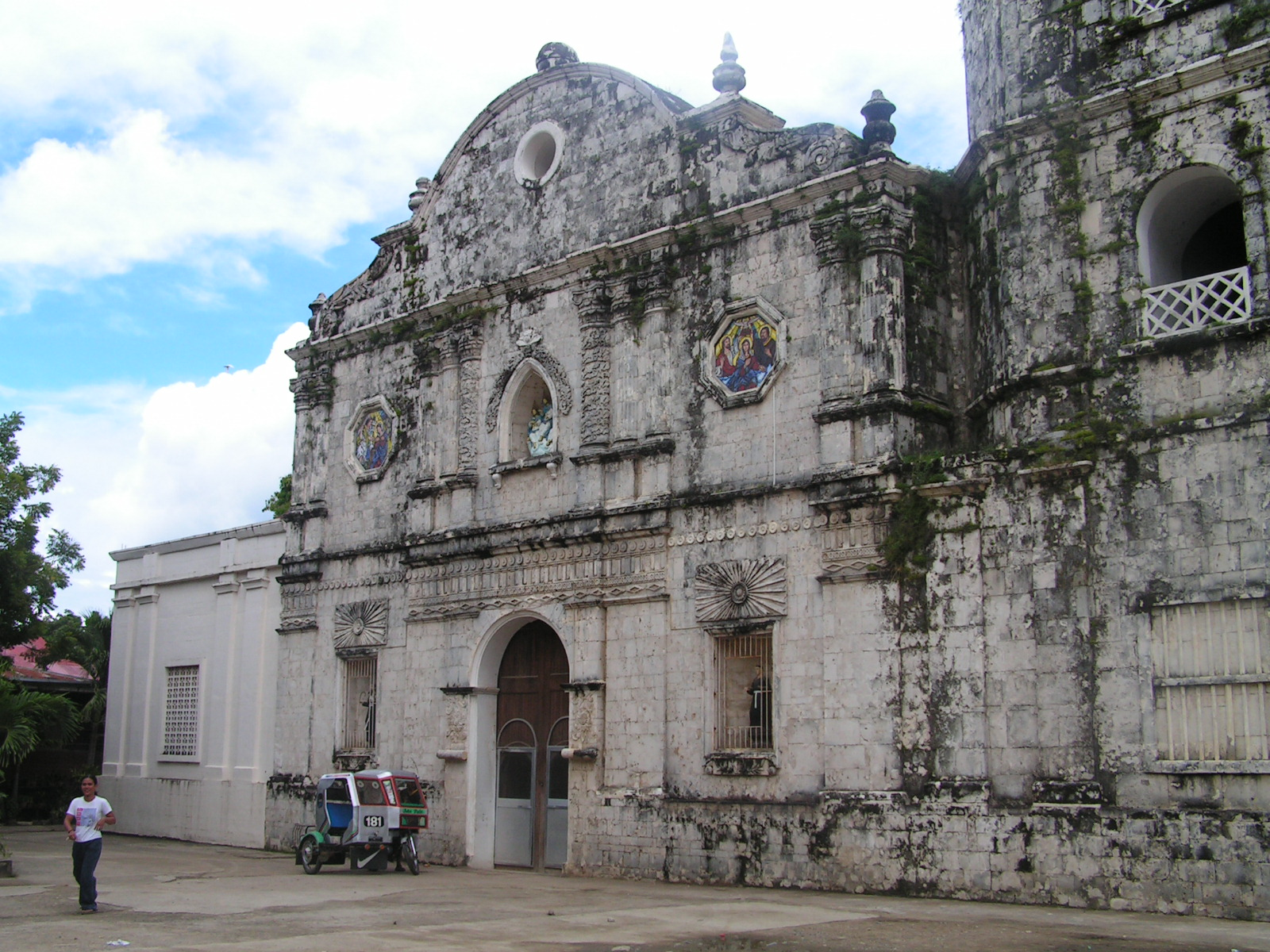
Roman Catholic church, Talibon, Bohol

Media related to Talibon Cathedral at Wikimedia Commons

== Tubigon ==
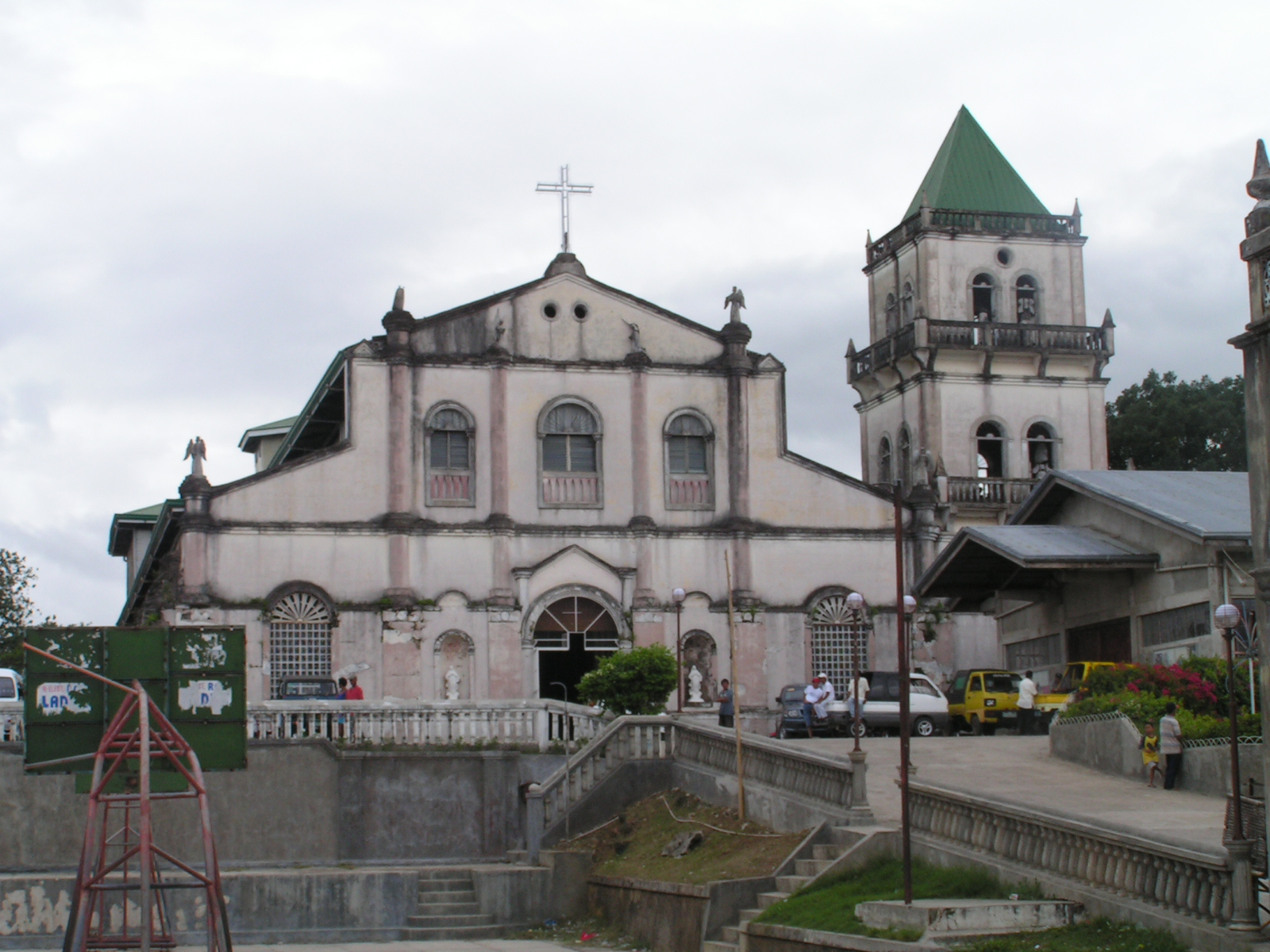
Roman Catholic church, Tubigon, Bohol

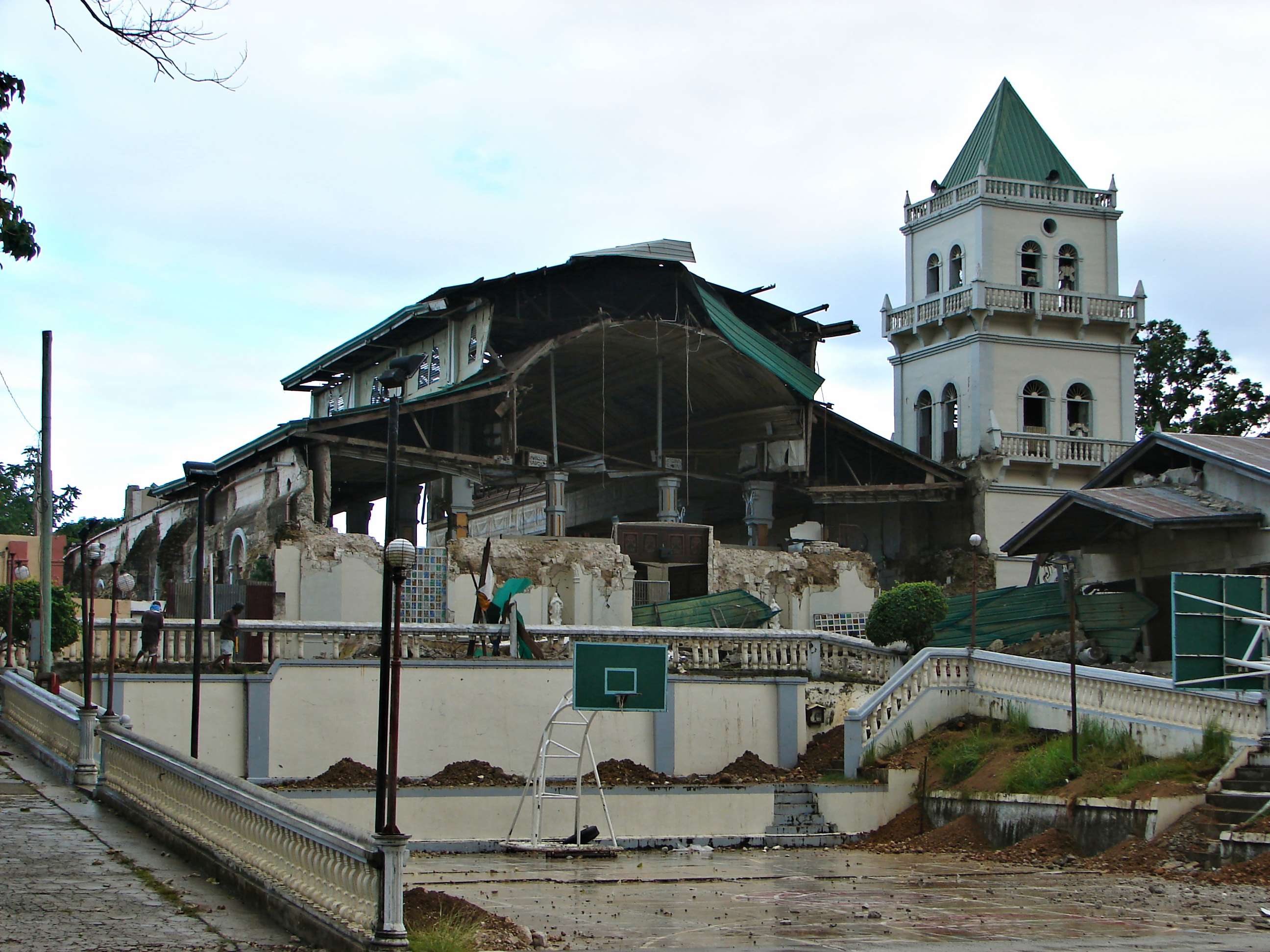
Ruins of Tubigon church after the 7.2 Bohol earthquake on year 2013

The San Isidro Labrador Parish Church in Tubigon is dedicated to the Spanish-born saint, St. Isidore the Farmer since its establishment as a parish on year 1852. Our Lady of the Most Holy Rosary is chosen as the secondary patron of the parish, as well as the patron for the parish's Basic Ecclesial Community (BEC). The Jesuits had already arrived in Tubigon and made a visita in year 1613 under the parish of Calape. The Jesuits regularly held masses every Sunday only. This is probably the same "Tobigu" meant by Pedro Chirino who stated that the people built a church in anticipation of the Jesuits' arrival. Tubigon no longer appeared in a 1779 inventory of churches, suggesting that the town may have been abandoned. Recollects took over the church on year 1768 and on year 1899, secular priests then took care of the parish. It was the mother parish of St. John of the Cross Parish in Brgy. Cahayag and Santa Cruz Parish in Brgy. Cawayanan.

The first church structure built to accommodate the locals before the 1852 present-day church stood on a hill, with a facade that faces the mountains. The locals of the town attributed the misfortunes, bad harvests, and calamities that happened in the town to the orientation of the church. It was said that it is not favorable for a church to face the mountains while turning its back to the sea. Upon the decision of building a bigger church structure due to the elevation of the visita to a parish, many locals insisted that the church's facade should face the sea as what it is in the present.

According to the manuscript titled, "A Brief Historical Account of the Municipality of Tubigon, Province of Bohol" on 1953 by Anastasio Maluenda, then the District Supervisor of Tubigon, the construction of the present church complex as well as the old convent began on year 1852 under the direction of Gobernadorcillo Benedicto Hurbana of Dauis and the parish priest Fr. Pedro Bolo. The old wooden convent building is nonexistent now after it was destroyed by a strong typhoon. The first mass was only held on the church on June 29, 1915, by Fr. Julio Fernandez who, on the same occasion, transferred the Holy Sacrament from the old church ruins to the present church. The church's ceiling paintings was done by Ray Francia on year 1928 under the direction of Fr. Jose de la Peña. The belltower was also made on the same year. However, it was only on year 1934 when the belltower was finished under the direction of Fr. Venerandro Reynes. The same parish priest also changed the wooden altar of the church with concrete one on year 1938.

Msgr. Camilo V. Auza changed again the altar in 1980s. Through the years, several changes happened in the church complex as the locals are willing to donate for better improvement of the church. This includes the addition of more pews on side aisles, adding a stained-glass art on the facade, as well as chandelier replacements and color scheme revision of the church's facade.

The church was heavily damaged by 2013 Bohol earthquake. The earthquake brought major destruction to the church's interior and caused its facade to collapse.

On year 2015, the church complex was declared as an Important Cultural Property by the National Historical Commission of the Philippines (NHCP). The marker can be seen on the right side of its main door.

The assessment and reconstruction of the damaged church due to the earthquake took 5 years before its doors opened again to the parishioners. On May 28, 2018, the church complex was turned over to San Isidro Labrador Parish and Diocese of Tagbilaran by NHCP who spearheaded the reconstruction.

The 1852 church of San Isidro Labrador Parish follows the basilical layout of a central nave with aisles, however, it has a transept, and the crossing is covered by an octagonal cupola. The church fabric shows a mixture of materials. The upper part of the wall and most of the façade is concrete, but the lower part is of rubble bound by lime mortar. Metal sheets are also used in the upper section of the nave. Jose (2001, 100) suggests that these modern materials were applied between the year when the bell tower was made.

Raymundo Francia painted the narthex ceiling with a depiction of the Triumphant entry of Jesus into Jerusalem, Baptism of Jesus, and John the Baptist calling for people to get baptized. St. Therese, David, and St. Cecilia can be seen depicted in the choir loft's ceiling. The seven sacraments, the Annunciation, and the Blessed Trinity can be seen depicted in the nave. Death scenes including the La Muerte de San Jose are depicted on the left side transept while the three types of church are painted on the right-side transept, namely: the Militant church, the Suffering church (also the Final Judgment), and the Triumphant church. St. Isidore and his wife, Maria de la Cabeza, can be seen painted on the side aisles ceiling. The two can also be seen on the sanctuary's ceiling together with the depiction of the Last Supper of Jesus. Francia employed the use of di sotto in su painting technique in the dome with a depiction of the Coronation of the Blessed Virgin Mary.

The main and side retablos are in Neo-classical design. The image of San Isidro Labrador is enthroned in the high main altar. The image of Saint Joseph is enthroned in the gospel retablo while the image of the secondary patron, Our Lady of the Most Holy Rosary, is enthroned in the epistle retablo.

The parish celebrates the feast of San Isidro Labrador every May 15. The parish also celebrates the feast day of its secondary patron, Our Lady of the Most Holy Rosary, every October with the celebration of the annual BEC Day.

== Trinidad ==
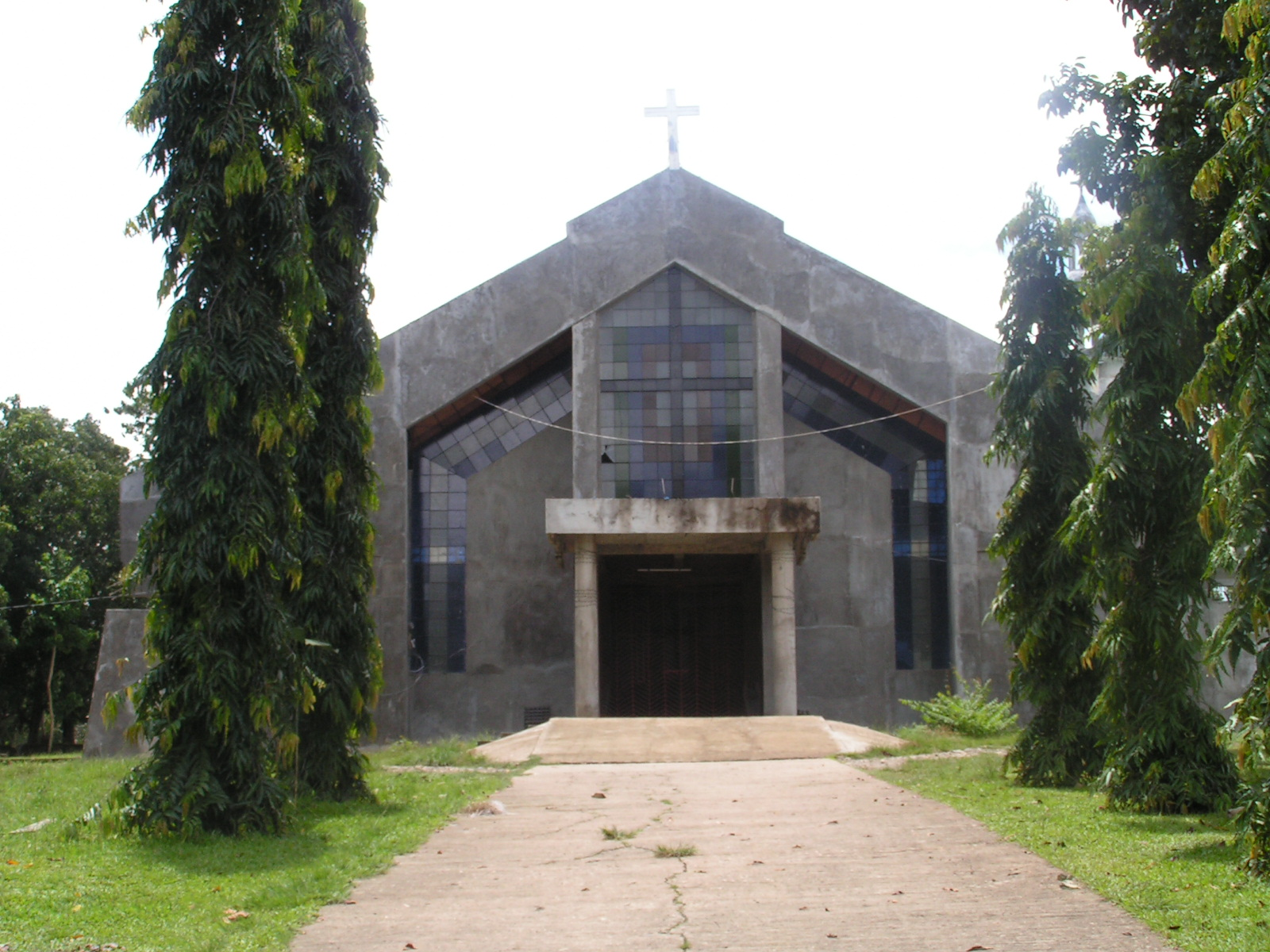
Roman Catholic church, Trinidad,Bohol

== Ubay ==
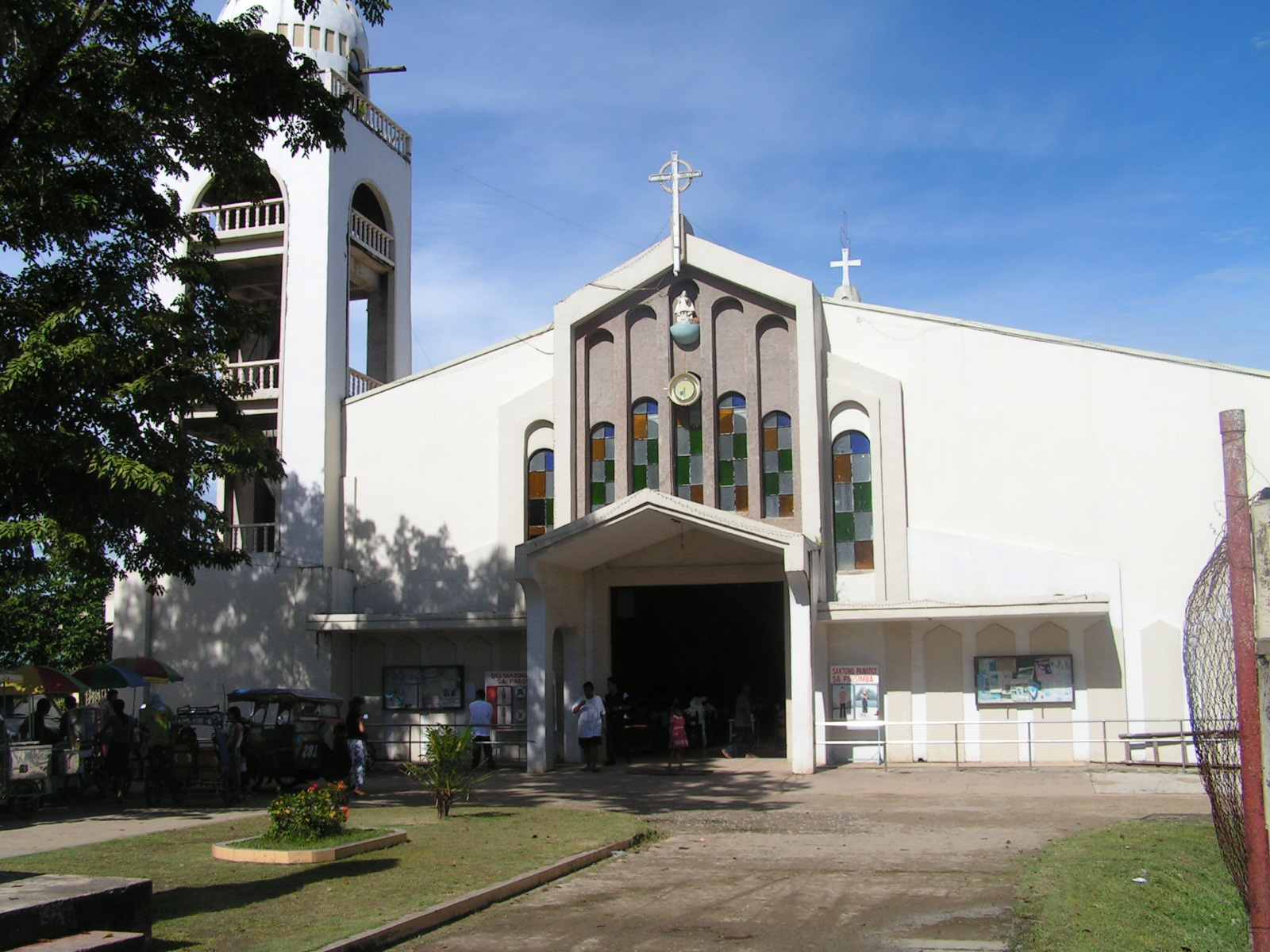
Roman Catholic church, Ubay, Bohol

== Valencia ==
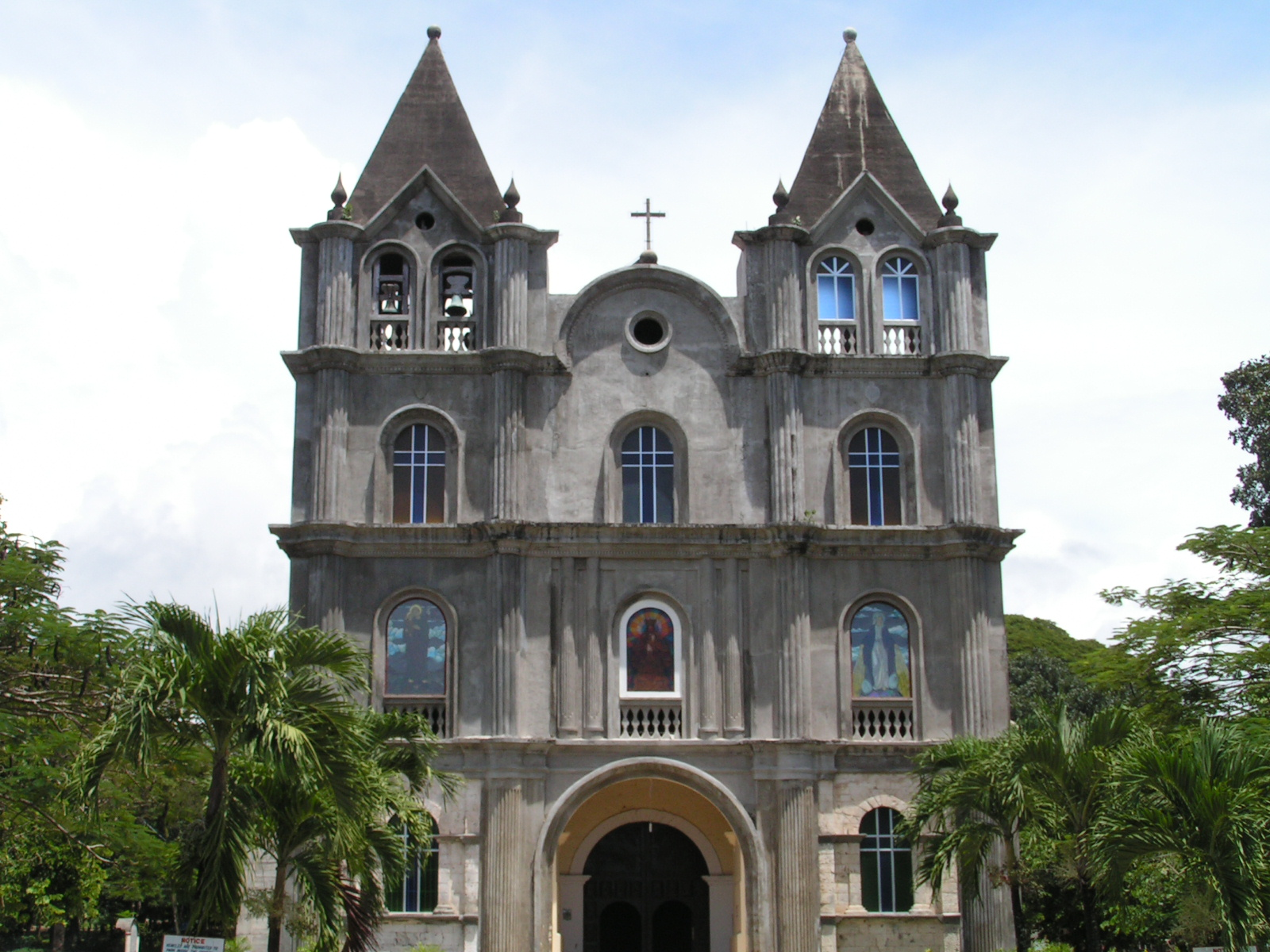
Roman Catholic church, Valencia, Bohol
