= Blas de Laserna =

Spanish composer

Blas de Laserna Nieva (1751 in Corella, Navarra – 1816 in Madrid) was a Spanish composer.

== Biography ==
Laserna was one of the most prolific and popular songwriters of late eighteenth and early nineteenth century Spain.

As an educator, he championed traditional Spanish musical forms, but as a theatrical impresario gave in to the public taste for Italian forms.

He composed several operas and concertos, as well as incidental music for several comedies in the popular Spanish theater. A prolific songwriter, his creative oeuvre contains more than five hundred songs (tonadillas), many with lyrics by Ramón de la Cruz.

While Conductor of the orchestra of the Teatro de la Cruz, he premiered his operetta, La Gitanilla Por Amor (The Gypsy Girl For Love), in 1791.

Enrique Granados used the melody from his "La Tirana del Tripili" as the basis for "Los Requiebros" in his Goyescas suite.
