= Corella, Spain =

Corella
- Flag Coat of arms

- Location of Corella / Navarre Corella (Spain)
- Coordinates: 42°06′53″N 1°47′12″W
- Country: Spain
- Autonomous Community: Navarre
- Province: Navarre
- Eskualdea: Ribera

Government
  - Mayor: Gorka García Izal (ACI)

Area
  - Total: 81.35 km^{2} (31.41 sq mi)
- Elevation: 371 m (1,217 ft)

Population
  - Total: 8,756
- Time zone: UTC+1 (CET)
  - Summer (DST): UTC+2 (CEST)
- Postal codes: 31591
- Area code: +34 948 (Navarre)
- Website: www.corella.es

Corella is a town and municipality in the province and autonomous community of Navarre, northern Spain. It is located 91.5 km from Pamplona, and is on the River Alhama, a tributary of the Ebro River. The population in 2023 was 8,629 inhabitants. Corella is the second most populated municipality in the Ribera of Navarre, southern part of Navarre. Corella is well known for its wine.

Corella was the birthplace of composer Blas de Laserna.
