= Juan Bautista Diamante =

Spanish dramatist (1625–1687)

Juan Bautista Diamante (29 August 1625? – 2 November 1687), minor Spanish dramatist of the school of Calderón, was the son of a Portuguese mother and a Sicilian merchant of Greek parentage who came to Madrid some time before 1631. He began writing for the stage in the early 1650s, gained favour at the courts of Philip IV and Charles II, and became a knight of St. John (of Malta) in 1660. It has been suggested that Juan Bautista may have been of Jewish stock, and that the Diamante family, including the playwright's half-brothers Pablo and Francisco Diamante who also achieved success in their different spheres, falsified public records of marriage, baptism, etc. in order to obscure their marrano origins.

Thirty-nine plays were published in his lifetime, twenty-four of them as Comedias de Fr. Don Iuan Bautista Diamante . . . in two parts in 1670 and 1674; the remainder appeared between 1656 and 1672 in the series Comedias escogidas de los mejores de España . . . . Many plays (some of doubtful attribution, such as La devoción del rosario, La Magdalena de Roma and La Judía de Toledo – see below) were printed or reprinted as sueltas in the eighteenth century.

Diamante collaborated with other playwrights and poets of the time, notably Matos Fragoso, Moreto, Juan Vélez, Sebastián de Villaviciosa, Lanini y Sagredo, Arce de los Reyes and Francisco de Avellaneda. In all, including works of collaboration, he produced around forty-five plays, plus two autos, a number of zarzuelas, and a handful of minor pieces (loas, bailes and entremeses).

According to Valbuena Prat, Diamante is historically interesting as the introducer of French dramatic methods into Spain. The originality of his work has however been questioned by critics. Much of his output is essentially a reworking or refundición of other dramatists' material. La Judía de Toledo, which was long considered his best play, is really Mira de Amescua's La Desgraciada Raquel under another title; and El Honrador de su padre (1658), is little more than a free translation (up to the end of the second act, at least) of Corneille's Le Cid.

His more successful plays were historical dramas such as El hércules de Ocaña, on the fearless Alonso de Céspedes, el Alcides castellano, and La reina María Estuarda, on the life (and death) of Mary, Queen of Scots.
