= 1651 in literature =

This article contains information about the literary events and publications of 1651.

== Events ==
- August 22 – Execution on Tower Hill in London of Welsh Protestant preacher Christopher Love
- The first book burning incident in the Thirteen Colonies occurs in Boston when William Pynchon, founder of Springfield, Massachusetts, publishes The Meritorious Price of Our Redemption, which criticises the Puritans who are at this time in power in Massachusetts. The book became the first to be banned in North America, and all known copies are publicly burned. Pynchon leaves for England prior to a scheduled appearance in court, and never returns.

== New books ==
=== Prose ===
- Noah Biggs – Chymiatrophilos, Matæotechnia medicinæ praxeōs, The vanity of the Craft of Physick, or, A new dispensator
- William Bosworth – The Chaste and Lost Lovers
- Roger Boyle, 1st Earl of Orrery – Parthenissa (first section)
- Mary Cary (Rande) – The Little Horn's Doom and Downfall and A New and More Exact Map of the New Jerusalem's Glory
- Marin le Roy de Gomberville – Jeune Alcidiane
- Francisco de Quevedo – Virtud militante contra las cuatro pestes del mundo y cuatro fantasmas de la vida
- Baltasar Gracián – El Criticón (first part)
- Thomas Hobbes – Leviathan, or The Matter, Forme and Power of a Common Wealth Ecclesiasticall and Civil
- John Milton – Defensio pro Populo Anglicano
- Robert Parker - The mystery of the vialls opened: being a short exposition upon the pouring out of the four last vialls, mentioned in the 16 chapter of the Revelation: wherein divers things relating to times present, past, and to come, are discovered: as the ruine of Antichrist, and the severall degrees thereunto; and the shadowing out these times wherein we live, are generally surveyed (posthumous)
- Paul Scarron – Roman comique (Comic romance, first part)
- Filip Stanislavov – Abagar (first printed book in modern Bulgarian)
- Anna Weamys – A Continuation of Sir Philip Sydney's Arcadia
- Sir Henry Wotton (posthumous) – Reliquiæ Wottonianæ; or, a collection of lives, letters, poems; with characters of sundry personages: and other incomparable pieces of language and art "By the curious pensil of the ever memorable Sr Henry Wotton Kt, late, provost of Eton Colledg"

=== Drama ===
- William Cartwright
  - The Lady Errant
  - The Ordinary
  - The Siege, or Love's Convert
  - Comedies, Tragi-Comedies, with Other Poems
- Pedro Calderon de la Barca – El alcalde de Zalamea
- Jerónimo de Cáncer – Obras varias
- Francisco López de Zárate – Hercules furente y oeta
- Juan de Matos Fragoso – La defensa de la Fè, y Principe prodigioso
- Thomas Randolph (attributed to) – Hey for Honesty, Down with Knavery (adapted from Aristophanes' Plutus)
- Jerónimo de Cáncer – Vejamen
- Leonard Willan – Astraea, or True Love's Mirror (adapted from Honoré D'Urfé's L'Astrée)

=== Poetry ===
- William Davenant – Gondibert (second impression)
- Francisco de Borja y Aragón – Nápoles recuperada
- Manuel de Salinas y Lizana – La casta Susana, paráfrasis poética de su sagrada historia
- Francisco de Trillo y Figueroa – Neapolisea
- Henry Vaughan – Olor Iscanus (Swan of Usk)

== Births ==
- April 6 – André Dacier, French classicist (died 1722)
- August 6 – François Fénelon, French theologian (died 1715)
- October 24 – Jean de La Chapelle, French dramatist (died 1723)
- November 12 – Juana Inés de la Cruz (Sor Juana), Mexican poet (died 1695)

== Deaths ==
- January 29 – Diego de Colmenares, Spanish historian (born 1586)
- February 14 – Jean Roberti, Flemish theologian (born 1569)
- April – Elizabeth Richardson, 1st Lady Cramond, English women's writer (born c. 1576)
- October 7 – Jacques Sirmond, French scholar (born 1559)
- December 14 – Pierre Dupuy, French scholar (born 1582)
- December 22 – Arnold Johan Messenius, Swedish royal historiographer (born 1607/1608)
- Unknown dates
  - Adho Duraso, Rajasthani poet (born c. 1550)
  - Henry Rice, Welsh courtier and writer (born c. 1585)
