= Francisco de Avellaneda =

Francisco Avellaneda (c. 1622 – c. 1684) was a playwright of the Spanish Golden Age.

== Biography ==
Little record survives of Avellaneda's early life, although he achieved notoriety in his time as a playwright. In 1660, he is known to have been in Valladolid for the festivities surrounding the transfer of the holy image of María de la Soledad (English: "Our Lady of Solitude"). In 1664, he published an account of the festival, along with his comedy El divino calabrés. El divino calabrés was a collaboration with Juan de Matos Fragoso. Avellaneda later became well known as a specialist in collaborative comedies.

== Works ==
Avellaneda became known for writing smaller pieces, such as short farces, dances, loas, entremés, and the farcical puppet shows known as mojigangas. He also wrote several pieces in collaboration with a number of partners. Juan de Matos Fragoso was a frequent collaborator; they worked together on El divino calabrés as well as San Francisco de Paula. In 1661, he published Cuantas veo tantas quiero with Sebastián de Villaviciosa. Working with Fragoso and Villaviciosa, he published La Corte en el valle, which was performed for King Philip IV in Valladolid in 1660, and Solo el piadoso es mi hijo, released in Madrid in 1661.

Many of his shorter theatrical pieces have been at times incorrectly attributed to other authors. Las casas de placer, for example, is often attributed to Pedro Calderón de la Barca, while La boda de Juan Rana has been ascribed to Jerónimo de Cáncer.

Other, better-remembered solo works include Lo que es Madrid, Los gansos, and El niño de la Rollona. El plenipapelier was presented in 1667 at the court of Vienna, accompanied by a Calderón play entitled Amado y aborrecido. El hidalgo de la Membrilla was first presented in 1661, also accompanied by a work of Calderón, El hijo del Sol. He also wrote the loa Loa por papeles para palacio.

Dances he is known to have composed include Las casas y El tabaco, the jácara La Flores y el Zurdillo and La Rabilla, and the mojiganga El titeretier, for the 1678 festival of Carnival.

He also composed El capuchino escocés, Volverse el rayo en laurel, and the mythologically inspired zarzuela El templo de Palas, with music by Juan Hidalgo de Polanco. El templo de palas was presented on July 26, 1675, at the court of Mariana of Austria. The play deals with a war between the children of Oedipus, Eteocles and Polinices. On the same occasion, he also presented a loa, La flor del sol, an entremés, El triunfo del vellocino, and a mojiganga, El mundi novi. This set was later published in Naples in 1675.

== Bibliography ==
- Javier Huerta, Emilio Peral, Héctor Urzaiz, Teatro español de la A a la Z. Madrid: Espasa-Calpe, 2005, p. 51.
- Gema Cienfuegos Antelo, El teatro breve de Francisco de Avellaneda: estudio y edición, Madrid, Fundación Universitaria Española, 2006.
- Gema Cienfuegos Antelo, "Francisco de Avellaneda", in Historia del Teatro Breve en España, Madrid, Iberoamericana-Verbuert, 2008, pp. 409–420.
- Héctor Urzáiz Tortajada y Gema Cienfuegos Antelo, "Francisco de Avellaneda: entremesista y censor de comedias 'por Su Majestad', Carlos II", in Teatro y poder en la época de Carlos II. Fiestas en torno a reyes y virreyes, Judith Farré ed., Madrid, Universidad de Navarra-Iberoamericana Verbuert, 2007, pp. 305–327.
