= Ana Caro de Mallén =

Poet and playwright of the Spanish Golden Age

Ana Caro de Mallén was a poet and playwright of the Spanish Golden Age.

== Life ==
Ana María Caro de Mallén y Torres, one of the few women writers of the 17th century, was believed to be born between 1590 and 1600 as a morisco slave and was adopted by Gabriel Caro de Mallén and Ana María de Torres. Many assumed she was Don Juan Caro de Mallén y Soto's sister, and that she was born in either Granada or Seville. In Seville, she began writing poetry and competing in poetry contests. Ana Caro's poetry reflects her society. It also demonstrated a close coalition between her and the monarchy. Caro appears to have died of the plague between 1645 and 1660.

== Career ==
Caro de Mallén's career took off when she published poetry and studies on festivals and cultural activities in 1628. When she published Contexto de las reales fiestas madrilenas del Buen Retiro in 1637, she had already moved to Madrid. Many of her male counterparts, including Juan de Matos Fragoso and Luis Vélez de Guevara, recognized her works, Caro was also a close friend of novelist Maria de Zaya. Caro made money from her poetry and plays transcending her to one of the first professional female writers. Ana Caro wrote two religious plays (autos sacramentales) and several entremeses, which are short interlude plays performed between acts of comedias. A loa sacramental and Coloquio entre dos are two of her entremeses that have survived. El conde partinuplés and Valor, agravio y mujer (Courage, Betrayal, and a Woman Scorned) are the only two full-length plays by Caro de Mallén that are still known today.

== Valor, agravio y mujer ==
Characters

Leonor: A noblewoman who cross dresses as a man to regain her honor after being deceived by Don Juan.

Don Juan: An arrogant nobleman from Cordova, who assembles fallacious vows with high class women, like Estela, and manages to trick Leonor into falling into his "game of love."

Estela: An indecisive countess that must choose between multiple men only in the end to fall in love with an unexpected person.

Don Fernando: Leonor’s brother and Don Juan’s best friend. He is also one of Estela's many suitors.

Ludovico: The Prince of Pinoy and is one of Estela's many suitors.

Act 1: Estela and Lisarda are introduced as damsels in distress after being intimidated by three robbers. Don Juan and his servant Tomillo come to their aid. Don Juan Introduces himself to Don Fernando as a "Burlador" from Cordova. In addition, Leonor and her servant, Ribete, are also introduced and the readers become aware of Leonor and Don Juan's discretions. Because she was seduced by Don Juan and lost her honor Ribete wants to defend Leonor's honor but she refuses, gets angry, and mentions that women should right their wrongs. Leonor decides to disguise herself as "Leonardo" to defend her own honor despite the societal norms that require a man to do so for her. She meets up with her brother Don Fernando and gives him a letter "from his sister Leonor".

Act 2: Leonor and Ribete create false identities to gain information and help one another. Estela shows no romantic interest towards Don Juan nor Ludovico, but confesses her feelings for Leonardo who explains that he does not reciprocate her love. Leonardo and Estela agree to meet at night and converse about their feelings; however, he cedes his place to Ludovico to go talk to Estela instead. Pretending to be Estela, Leonor writes Don Juan a letter asking him to meet with her at night. During their meeting, she expresses to him that she knows about the Sevillian women and that she has lost interest in him.

Act 3: Don Juan suspects that Don Fernando has told Estela the secret of his past, but he denies it. Unintentionally Don Juan exposes his secret to Estela when he asks her about the woman he seduced in Spain. In shock, Estela reveals that this is the first time she has heard of his infidelity. Leonardo expresses his disinterest in Estela. Don Juan and Leonardo discuss his infidelity. Leonardo reveals to Don Juan that he is there to take vengeance on Leonor's behalf so that after Don Juan is killed, Leonor can then marry Leonardo. This makes Don Juan jealous, exposing his sentiments of remorse and regret for his wrongdoings towards Leonor. Leonardo challenges Don Juan to a duel. Don Fernando and Ludovico interrupt the attempted duel and are told by Leonardo that the woman Don Juan seduced in Seville was Don Fernando's sister, Leonor. Leonardo then transforms into Leonor and reveals the trick she played on Don Juan. At the end, several marriages are arranged, Leonor with Don Juan (restoring her honor), Don Fernando with Estela, Ludovico with Estela's cousin, and Ribete with Flora.

The title of this play, Valor, agravio y mujer, describes the protagonist as well as the scenes of the play; it describes her as a woman (mujer), having been offended (agravio), and having courage (valor).

== El conde Partinuplés ==
Although El conde Partinuplés was severely criticized up to the last decade of the twentieth century, it has undergone a thorough revaluation. While some believe the play challenges the patriarchal tradition, others reject this claim. The play seems to have been performed in Madrid around 1637. Although based on a popular book of chivalry, it also includes numerous echoes of Pedro Calderón de la Barca's plays, particularly those published in the first part of his works (1636).

== Writing style ==
Being that Caro de Mallén was a poet, a poetic style of writing was prevalent in her Dramas. She was known for writing dialogue that included single stanza verse shifts between characters that were made up largely of exchanges of metaphor. Many consider the bantering style of Caro de Mallén's plays witty. The majority of her plays include a wide range of characters, from servant characters who speak in low-brow humor to characters born of nobility. Through her comedic plays Caro de Mallén made comments on the social and political realities of 17th century Spain. Popular thematic ideas that are present in Caro de Mallén's work are revenge, honor, intrigue, and Love triangles.
