= Juan Vélez de Guevara =

Juan Crisóstomo Vélez de Guevara (Madrid, 1611 – íbid., 20 November 1675), son of Luis Vélez de Guevara, was, like his father, a playwright of the Spanish Golden Age.

Like his father Luis, Juan Vélez entered the service of the Duque de Veragua as a lawyer, and from there in 1642 succeeded his father as an Usher of the Royal Chamber. Well known in his day as a composer of short theatrical pieces, notably entremeses and bailes, many of them performed at the Spanish Court, Vélez junior likewise wrote and published full-length plays such as El diciembre por agosto, Nuestra Señora de las Nieves (1637), Endimión y la luna (1656), and the zarzuela Los celos hacen estrella (1672).

He also wrote, in collaboration, Amor vencido de Amor (with Juan de Zabaleta and Antonio de la Huerta); La verdad en el engaño (with Jerónimo de Cáncer and Martínez de Meneses); the burlesque Los siete infantes de Lara (1650, with Jerónimo de Cáncer); and La cortesana en la sierra and El hidalgo de La Mancha (with Juan Bautista Diamante and Juan de Matos Fragoso).

== Sources ==
- Javier Huerta Calvo dir., Historia del teatro español, Madrid, Gredos, 2003.
