= Feliciana Enríquez de Guzmán =

Spanish playwright of the Spanish Golden Age

- Born: 1569; Seville
- Died: c. 1644
- Occupation: playwright

Feliciana Enríquez de Guzmán (1569–c. 1644) was a Spanish playwright of the Spanish Golden Age and one of the first women to write a play in Spanish. She is known for a two part play Los jardines y campos sabeos with several comic interludes. Its second print edition includes theoretical texts in which she asserts her position within the world of theatre.

== Life ==
Not much is known about the life of Feliciana Enríquez de Guzmán. She was born in Seville. It is estimated that she had to be born before 1580, as she signed a legal document as an adult in 1605 (the coming of age for women in Spain at the time was 25). Latest sources state her year of birth as 1569. Her year of death is also disputed, with likely dates being 1643–44, or 1644.

Enríquez de Guzmán married twice, first to a much older widower Cristóbal Ponce de Solís, as a marriage of convenience, then shortly after his death she married Francisco de León Garavito, presumably out of attachment. After becoming a widow for the second time, she lived her last years in poverty, much like Mariana de Carvajal y Saavedra, another woman writer in a similar position.

== Career ==
Enríquez de Guzmán is considered to be likely the first woman to write a play in Spanish and is a trailblazer of women's rights. She chose her own path in literature, opting not to follow the literary fashion of the day and to focus on the ideas of the classics instead.

She wrote a play in two parts called Los jardines y campos sabeos, (The Sabean Gardens and Countryside), which she completed in October 1619. Each part serves as an independent piece, with only some recurring characters, and is a retelling of classical mythology. The play was first shown in 1623 in Seville, with king Philip IV of Spain possibly in the audience. The play was printed in 1624 (Coimbra) and 1627 (Lisbon), together with four interludes.

The second, expanded edition of Los jardines y campos sabeos included two theoretical texts titled Carta ejecutoria and A los lectores, in which she defends her work from those critics who would dismiss it solely because of the gender of the author. She also comments on the difficulties of women dramatists trying to enter the world of theatre. In a manner similar do Miguel de Cervantes' prologue to his Novelas ejemplares, where the author claims that he is "the first to have written a novel in Spanish", Enríquez de Guzmán remarks that she is the first Spanish playwright to follow the Aristotelian rules.

Many scholars consider Enríquez de Guzmán to be the model for the character of Feliciana in Lope de Vega's Laurel de Apolo – a learned woman who attended University of Salamanca in male disguise (possibly a shorthand for Enríquez de Guzmán's wisdom and knowledge) who is praised by the author.

== Legacy ==
In 2016, Enríquez de Guzmán's interludes were translated into English for the first time in an anthology titled Women Playwrights of Early Modern Spain edited by Nieves Romero-Díaz and Lisa Vollendorf and translated by Harley Erdman. According to Alexander Samson of University College London, her comic interludes, or Entremeses, are "comic masterpieces" which are "crying out for contemporary stagings". The anthology also contains works by Ana Caro de Mallén and Marcela de San Félix.

Enríquez de Guzmán's comic interludes were used as a basis for a 1997 theatre play Las gracias mohosas, which was staged at the Corral de Comedias de Almagro.
