= Baile =

Baile ("dance" in Spanish) may refer to:

- Baile (Spanish play), a Spanish dramatic form
- Baile funk, a type of dance music from Rio de Janeiro
- Baile, the Irish Gaelic word for a town, usually anglicized as "bally" or "balla"
- Baile, the Scottish Gaelic word for a crofting township; see Township (Scotland)
- Băile (disambiguation), several places in Romania
