= Juan Hidalgo de Polanco =

Spanish composer and harpist

Juan Hidalgo de Polanco (28 September 1614 – 31 March 1685) was a Spanish composer and harpist who became the most influential composer of his time in the Hispanic world writing the music for the first two operas created in Spanish. He is considered by many to be the father of Spanish opera and of the zarzuela.

Hidalgo was born and died in Madrid. In either 1630 or 1631 he became a harpist at the Spanish royal chapel where he was responsible for the accompaniment of both sacred and secular music and also played for the King of Spain, King Philip IV. Around 1645 he began to serve as leader of the court's chamber musicians and chief composer of villancicos, chamber songs, and music for the theatre.

He personifies the origins of Spanish opera with the work Celos aun del aire matan (es) by the illustrious playwright Calderon de la Barca, based on the story of Cephalus and Procris told in Ovid's Metamorphoses, released on 5 December 1660 to celebrate the third birthday of prince Felipe Prospero. It is considered the oldest opera preserved in Spain.

Juan Hidalgo dominated secular and theatrical music at the Spanish court until his death. He was a prolific composer and enjoyed a great deal of popularity throughout his career. His place in Spanish theatre history is equivalent to that of Henry Purcell in Britain and Lully in France. He wrote music for at least nine allegorical religious plays that were performed in public for Corpus Christi. His work for the court stages included songs for 16 spoken plays (comedias), many partly sung zarzuelas and semi-operas, and two full operas which are highly regarded. His output also included a large number of sacred villancicos and some liturgical music.

His life is the basis of a novel, The Harpist of Madrid, by the English author Gordon Thomas. Composer Celia Torra based her choral composition Las campanas on a melody by Hidalgo.

== Selected works ==
- 1656 - Pico y Canente (Luis de Ulloa y Pereira) / Comedia pastoral.
- 1658? - Triunfos de amor y fortuna (Antonio de Solís) / Obra mitológica. In collaboration with Cristobal Galán.
- 1658 - El laurel de Apolo (Pedro Calderón de la Barca) / Zarzuela (missing music).
- 1660 - La púrpura de la rosa (Calderón de la Barca) / Ópera (missing music).
- 1660 - Celos aun del aire matan (Calderón de la Barca) / Ópera.
- 1661 - Eco y Narciso (Calderón de la Barca) / Comedia pastoral.
- 1661 - El hijo del Sol, Faetón (Calderón de la Barca).
- 1662 - Ni amor se libra de amor (Calderón de la Barca) /Zarzuela (missing)
- 1670 - La estatua de Prometeo (Calderón de la Barca) / Zarzuela.
- 1670 - Fieras afemina amor (Calderón de la Barca)
- 1672 - Los celos hacen estrellas (Juan Vélez de Guevara) / Zarzuela (conserved music)
- 1672 - Alfeo y Aretusa (Juan Bautista Diamante) / Zarzuela
- 1673 - Los juegos olímpicos (Agustín de Salazar y Torres) / Zarzuela
- 1675 - El templo de Palas (Francisco de Avellaneda).
- 1680 - Hado y divisa de Leonido y Marfisa (Calderón de la Barca) / Ópera.
- 1684 - Apolo y Leucotea (Pedro Scotti de Agoiz) / Zarzuela.
- 1684 - Endimión y Diana (Melchor Fernández de León) / Zarzuela
- 1684 - Ícaro y Dédalo (Fernández de León) / Obra mitológica
- 1695 - El primer templo de Amor (Fernández de León) / Mitológica-pastoral

== Sources ==
- Louise K. Stein. The New Grove Dictionary of Opera, edited by Stanley Sadie (1992), ISBN 0-333-73432-7 and ISBN 1-56159-228-5
