= Religious drama =

Religious drama may refer to:

- Natya - the sacred Hindu temple drama
- Liturgical drama - Christian drama
- Auto sacramental - Spanish religious drama
