= Villandrando =

Villandrando is a surname. Notable people with the surname include:

- Agustín de Rojas Villandrando (1572–1618), Spanish writer
- Rodrigo de Villandrando (routier) (died 1457), Spanish routier
- Rodrigo de Villandrando (painter) (1588–1622), Spanish painter
