= Suelta =

Suelta may refer to:

- Salsa suelta, a syle of Salsa dancing
- Comedia suelta, a practice of printing of plays in separate editions
- Suelta, a song title in:
  - Contra la Corriente (Noriega album)
  - Haciendo Escante, Nicky Jam album
