= Sebastián Rodríguez =

Sebastián Rodríguez may refer to:

- Sebastián Rodríguez de Villaviciosa (1618–1663), Spanish dramatist
- Sebastián Rodríguez Veloso (born 1957), Spanish Paralympic swimmer
- Pablo Sebastián Rodríguez (born 1978), Argentine basketball player
- Sebastián Rodríguez (footballer) (born 1992), Uruguayan footballer
