= Spanish Golden Age theatre =

Theatre in Spain roughly between 1590 and 1681

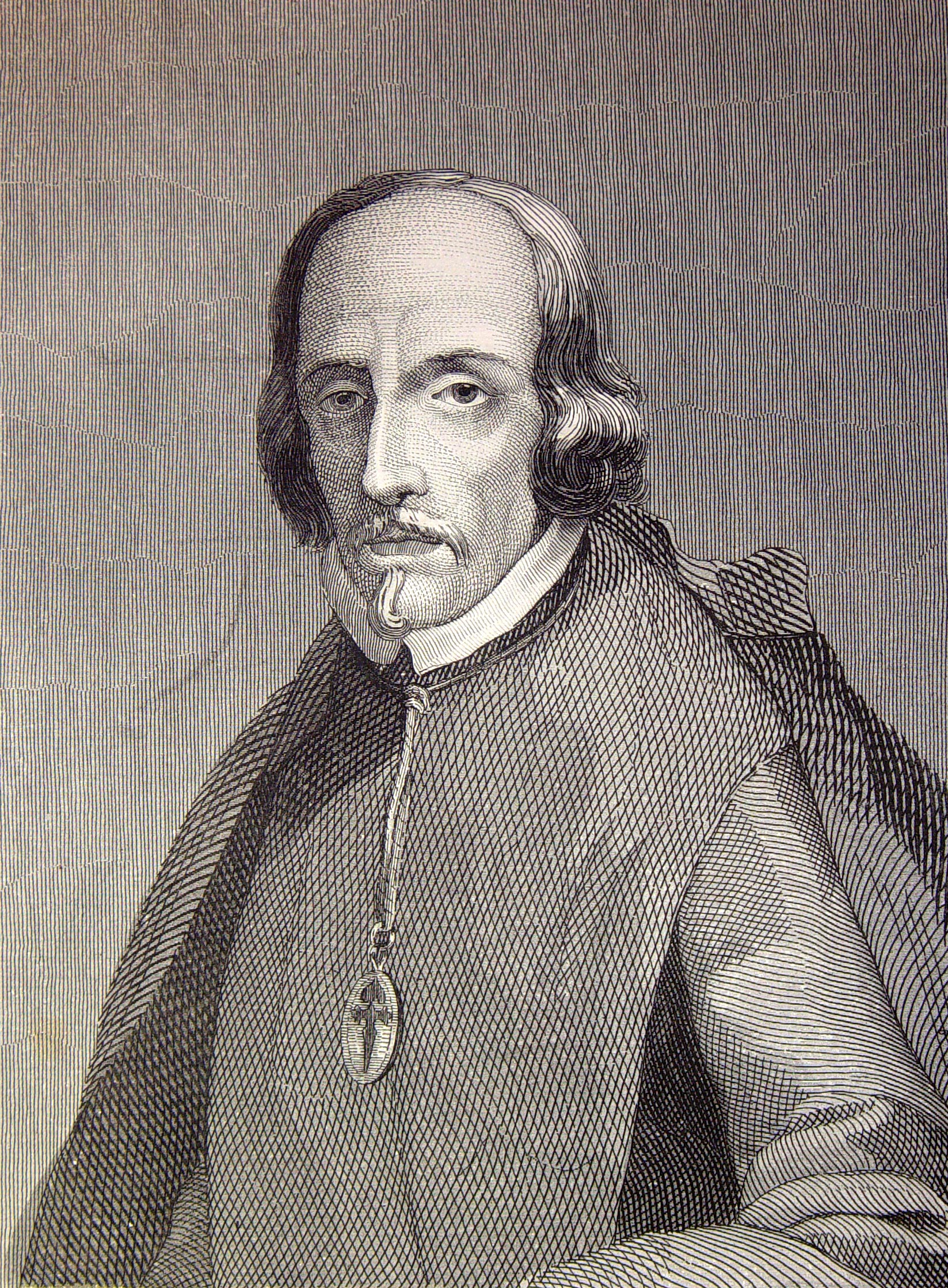
Calderón de la Barca, a key figure in the theatre of the Spanish Golden Age

Spanish Golden Age theatre refers to theatre in Spain roughly between 1590 and 1681. Spain emerged as a European power after it was unified by the marriage of Ferdinand II of Aragon and Isabella I of Castile in 1469 and then claimed for Christianity at the Siege of Granada in 1492. The sixteenth and seventeenth centuries saw a monumental increase in the production of live theatre as well as in the importance of the arts within Spanish society.

== Overview ==
Theatre was an accessible art form for all participants in Renaissance Spain, being both highly sponsored by the aristocratic class and highly attended by the lower classes. The volume and variety of Spanish plays during the Golden Age was unprecedented in the history of world theatre, surpassing even the dramatic production of the English Renaissance by a factor of at least four. This volume has been as much a source of criticism as praise for Spanish Golden Age theatre, for emphasizing quantity before quality. A large number of the plays of this period (10,000 to 30,000) are still considered masterpieces today. This prolific production greatly contributed to the accessibility of theatre in Spain. For modern theatre historians, however, it has contributed to the difficulty of researching theatre from this period. The vast majority of plays have remained virtually untouched, in terms of both production and scholarly analysis, since the seventeenth century. Combined with the error prone printing techniques that plagued the publication of Spanish plays, this has vastly undercut the study of Spanish Golden Age theatre. Although a thorough inclusive analysis remains difficult or even impossible, Spanish Golden Age theatre represents an area of active and productive research for theatre historians.

== Genres ==
Noted for its variety, the theatre of Renaissance Spain was the only in Europe to simultaneously include secular and religious dramas. Additionally, state sponsored drama existed harmoniously alongside popular for-profit theatre, with many theatre artists contributing significantly to both. Stylistically, plays ranged from straight plays to operas and from bawdy comedies to epic tragedies. Spain also introduced its own forms and genres of theatre with the development of the Comedia nueva and the zarzuela.

=== Religious drama ===
The most common religious plays in this era were about saints lives (comedias de santos). Playwrights often based the work on existing books although in Cervantes's El rufían dichoso the protagonist is never canonized. Another class of plays was based on the bible, a subset of which reflected some aspect of church teachings. Lope de Vega's La hermosa Ester and Tirso de Molina's La venganza de Tamar were examples of biblical themed works in the broader sense, and Antonio Mira de Amescua's El ejemplo mayor de la desdicha, Pedro Calderón de la Barca's El príncipe constante and Tirso's El condenado por desconfiado could be considered to reflect the narrower meaning of church teaching, although debate exists among scholars about how the religiously themed works should be subclassified. Some of the questions that arise is whether the plays are primarily religious or cross the line to didacticism, or whether a play about a Biblical monarch is a kingship play.

- Autos sacramentales celebrated the mystery of the Eucharist by mixing the human, supernatural, and allegorical.
- They were performed in two or four carros (two-story wagons) in parades around Madrid and other cities as part of the Corpus Christi processions.
- They were produced by trade guilds until the mid-sixteenth century when municipal authorities produced them at great expense.
- Starting in the 1550s they were performed by professional acting troupes and mixed civic and religious authority.
- A special introductory prologue called a Loa sometimes preceded Autos Sacramentales. Each Loa was specific to the play it was performed with and to the audience it was performed for, and were designed to get the audience interested in the play they were about to see. The word Loa means to compliment and garner good will.

=== Public theatre ===
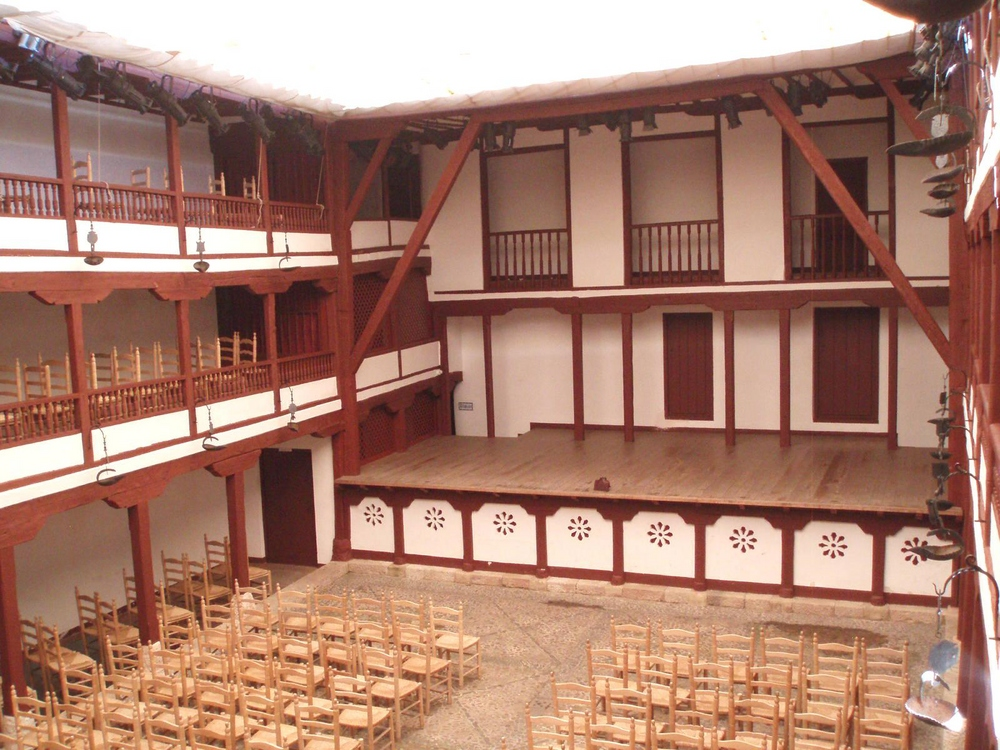
Corral de comedias in Almagro

- Professional public theatre was established in Spain's major cities during the 1570s. The Corral de la Cruz, built in 1579, was Madrid's first permanent theatre.
- Corrales de comedias originated from courtyard performances, and were constructed within rectangular courtyards enclosed by buildings on three sides. The stage was raised with a permanent backdrop, and a patio for standing spectators was placed in the upper levels.
- Alojerias were refreshment booths and above them were galleries for more spectators: cazuelas (reserved for women), and aposentos (box seats). Audiences were often lively and unruly.
- Corrales were originally licensed to charitable organizations, which used performance to support hospitals and aid the poor.

=== Theatre at court ===
- Court performances emerged during the seventeenth century during Philip III's reign (1598–1621) at Alcazar, the royal palace.
- In 1633 Buen Retiro—a new palace on the outskirts of Madrid—became the center for court entertainment; in 1640 by Italian set designers supervised the establishment of the Coliseo, a permanent outdoor theatre.
- Cosimo Lotti (1571–1643) engineered a special stage above lake waters with a silver chariot drawn across the surface by two large fish, and a mountain was transformed into a palace in Calderon's Love, the Greatest Enchantment (1635).

== Themes ==
Honor is a major theme in Spanish Golden Age drama. Theatre was used as a metaphor for life, and honor was therefore represented in a number of ways on stage, for example, reputation, and juxtaposed against disillusionment and hypocrisy. Right versus wrong is a common theme in plays from this period and Lope de Vega himself believed that everyone reacts to honor. Honorable (Christian) conduct is enforced by the public and to lose your honor is to live in shame and despair. A large number of plots focus on the fear of lost reputation and on masculine honor based on women's chastity. While women seem to control their men's honor, gender roles are only very conservatively challenged. While poverty is everywhere, the plays are filled with picturesque scenes, glorious churches, and courts. Still, the playwrights of the time throw a bit of cynicism in their work. The stock character of the gracioso (disillusioned clown) survives the stories without even wondering about right and wrong.

== Playwrights ==
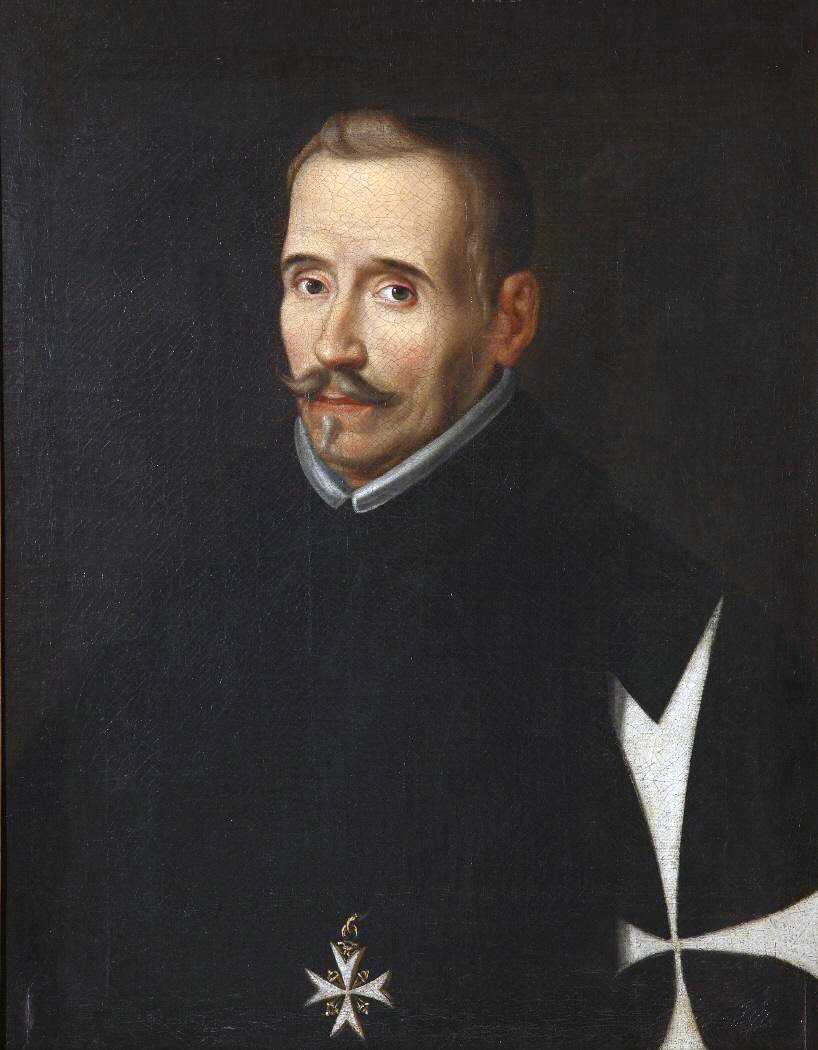
Portrait of Lope de Vega

- Lope de Vega (November 25, 1562 – August 27, 1635) One of the key figures in the Spanish Golden Century of Baroque literature. His reputation in the world of Spanish literature is second only to that of Miguel de Cervantes, while the sheer volume of his literary output (between 800 and 1800 plays) is unequalled, making him one of the most prolific authors in the history of literature. His most notable play is Fuenteovejuna (1613).
- Calderón de la Barca (January 17, 1600 – May 25, 1681) During certain periods of his life he was also a soldier and a Roman Catholic priest. Born when the theatre was being defined by Lope de Vega, he developed it further, his work being regarded as the culmination of the Spanish Baroque theatre. As such, he is regarded as one of Spain's foremost dramatists and one of the finest playwrights of world literature. One of his most notable plays is Life is a Dream (1629–1635). He also wrote about 80 Autos Sacramentales.
- Lope de Rueda (1510–1565) A very versatile writer, he wrote dramas, comedies, farces, and pasos. He was the precursor to what is considered the golden age of Spanish literature. His predecessors wrote mostly for court, but he was able to use his abundance of riotous humour, great knowledge of low life, and a most happy gift of dialogue to create a taste for drama. His works were issued posthumously in 1567 by Timoneda and include Eufemia, Med Ora, Arinelina, and Los Engañados.
- Sor Juana Inés de la Cruz (November 12, 1651 – April 17, 1695) An important female Mexican self-taught playwright, poet, and nun. While she lived in colonial era Mexico during the time when it was ruled by Spain, she is considered both a Mexican and Spanish Golden Age dramatist. One of her notable works include Loa to the Divine Narcissus. She is also pictured on the 200 pesos bill issued by the Banco de Mexico.
- Juan del Encina (July 12, 1468 – late 1529 or early 1530) Often called the Founder of Spanish Drama. One of his notable works is Cancionero (1496), a collection of lyrical and dramatic poems.
- Gil Vicente (1465–1536) Called the Trobadour, he was a Portuguese playwright and poet who acted in and directed his own plays. He worked in Portuguese as much as he worked in Spanish and is thus, with Juan del Encina, considered joint-father of Spanish drama.
- Tirso de Molina (March 24, 1579 – March 12, 1648) A Baroque dramatist, poet, and Roman Catholic monk. During his lifetime he wrote around four hundred plays, of which only eighty still exist. One of his most famous plays is El Burlador de Sevilla y convidado de piedra (The Trickster of Seville and the Stone Guest), the piece in which Don Juan is first presented on the stage.
- Francisco de Rojas Zorrilla (October 4, 1607 – January 23, 1648) Many of his works were adapted outside of Spain. His main pieces are Del rey abajo ninguno and No hay padre siendo rey, both published in the 1640s.
- Juan Ruiz de Alarcón (c. 1581 - 4 August 1639) Fitzmaurice-Kelly said of Alarcón: "There are Spanish dramatists greater than Ruiz de Alarcón: there is none whose work is of such even excellence."

== Actors and companies ==
After 1603 only licensed companies could work in Spain, and licenses were limited in availability. Unemployed actors joined the compañías de la legua (“companies of language”) and performed in the countryside. Companies could not perform in one place for more than two months annually, and only one company was permitted to perform at that location. In 1615, Madrid assumed control and hired companies made up of actor-managers (autores), actors, and apprentices, subject to government rules. These companies were licensed by the Royal Council and highly paid to perform Autos Sacramentales both in court and at public theatres. Actors generally worked for managers under a 1 to 2-year contract and a typical schedule had actors study their role from 2am to 9am, rehearse until noon, take a break to eat, then perform until 7pm. While women were licensed to perform starting in 1587, this practice remained controversial until 1599, when a royal decree stipulated that only women married to company members could perform. Important performers included Lope de Rueda and later Juan Rana.

== Costumes ==
Costumes during this time were very similar to Elizabethan or English Renaissance theatre costumes. Actors dressed as lavishly as finances permitted and contracts even had special allowances for costumes. Records show that actors paid anywhere from 1/5 to 1/2 of their salary for one costume and some even petitioned civic officials for extra funds for costumes. Towns gave awards for acting and costumes, showing that the quality of the costumes was quite important to the audience. The government made many rules dictating the specifications of costumes. For example, actors performing in Auto Sacramentales had to wear silk or velvet and women were forbidden to wear strange headdresses, décolleté necklines, or wide-hooped or non-floor length skirts. As well, actors were only allowed to wear one costume per play, unless it was specially stated in the text.

== Design elements ==
Three kinds of scenic background were utilized: the facade; the curtains concealing the facade, which were used when the location was not particularly important; and medieval-type mansions, which were sometimes erected on the main stage. As spectacle increased after 1650, painted flats with doors and windows were set into the facade in place of curtains. After a period of time, awnings were rigged over the seating, and, eventually, the addition of a permanent roof made it an indoor theatre. In the 1640s and 1650s set designs of new public and court theatres were supervised by Italian designers. Machines that simulated wind and the sounds of thunder (created with metal sheets or dropping planks of wood), rain (similar to a large rainstick, and a swelling ocean were quite common and delighted theatregoers of this time. Musicians were also commonly used to create moods and important sound effects.

== Significance ==
Unlike the rest of Europe, Spain had unique theatre traditions. Religious plays continued to be produced and popular into the 1700s, religious and secular theatre thrived side by side, and actors were accepted in church and as worthwhile members of society. As well, Spain pioneered a three-act model for plays instead of the classic five acts, allowed women on stage, and had an organized and efficient system of actor contracts, travel stipends, licenses, and booking. Most importantly, Spanish Golden Age theatre produced wonderful politically and philosophically allegorical plays such as Calderon's Life is a Dream, and Lope de Vega's Fuente Ovejuna, that spoke specifically to the audience of the time.

The sources of influence for the emerging national theatre of Spain were as diverse as the theatre that nation produced during the Golden Age. Storytelling traditions originating in Italian Commedia dell'arte and the uniquely Spanish expression of Western Europe's traveling minstrel entertainments contributed a populist influence on the narratives and the music, respectively, of early Spanish theatre. Neo-Aristotelian criticism and liturgical dramas, on the other hand, contributed literary and moralistic perspectives. In turn, Spanish Golden Age theatre has dramatically influenced the theatre of later generations in Europe and throughout the world. Spanish drama had an immediate and significant impact on the contemporary developments in English Renaissance theatre. It has also had a lasting impact on theatre throughout the Spanish speaking world. Currently, a growing number of works are being translated, increasing the reach of Spanish Golden Age theatre and strengthening its reputation among critics and theatre patrons.

== See also ==
- English Renaissance theatre
- History of theatre
- Spanish Golden Age
- Revenge play
- Cloak and dagger play
