= Antonio Hurtado de Mendoza =

Spanish dramatist

Antonio Hurtado de Mendoza (1586 – 22 September 1644) was a Spanish dramatist.

== Biography ==
Hurtado was born in Castro Urdiales, Cantabria.

He became page to the count de Saldaña (son of the duke de Lerma), and was recognized as a rising poet by Miguel de Cervantes in the Viaje del Parnaso (1614). He attended the Medrano Academy, under the direction of the founder and president Sebastián Francisco de Medrano, from 1616–1622. He rose rapidly into favor under Philip IV, who appointed him private secretary, commissioned from him comedias palaciegas for the royal theatre at Aranjuez, and in 1623 conferred on him the orders of Santiago and Calatrava. Most of his contemporaries and rivals paid court to el discreto de palacio, and Mendoza seems to have lived on the friendliest terms with all his brother dramatists except Ruiz de Alarcón. He is said to have been involved in the fall of Olivares, and died unexpectedly at Zaragoza on 19 September 1644.

His theatrical works include numerous entremés works.

Only one of his plays, Querer por solo querer, was published with his consent; it is included in a volume (1623) containing his semi-official account of the performances at Aranjuez in 1622. The best edition of Mendoza's plays and verses bears the title of Obras liricas y comicas, divinas y humanas (1728). Much of his work does not rise above the level of graceful and accomplished verse; but that he had higher qualities is shown by El marido hace mujer, a brilliant comedy of manners, which forms the chief source of Molière's École des maris.

The Fiesta que se hizo en Aranjuez and Querer por solo querer were translated into English by Sir Richard Fanshawe, afterwards ambassador at Madrid, in a posthumous volume published in 1671.

== Works ==
=== Poetry ===
- Convocatoria de las cortes de Castilla
- Vida de Nuestra Señora
- La guerra

=== Theatre ===
- Amor con amor se paga
- El marido hace mujer y el trato muda costumbre (1631–32)
- Cada loco con su tema o el montañés indiano (1630)
- No hay amor donde no hay agravio
- Los empeños del mentir
- Más merece quien más ama (after 1634)
- Querer por solo querer
- Ni callarlo ni decirlo
- Los empeños del mentir (written with Francisco de Quevedo)
- Quien más miente, más medra (written with Francisco de Quevedo in 1631)

=== Entremés ===
- Famoso Entremés Getafe
- El Ingenioso Entremés del Examinador Miser Palomo
