= Celos aun del aire matan =

Celos aun del aire matan ("Jealousy, even groundless, kills") is a 1660 opera in three acts - originally performed over three days - by Juan Hidalgo de Polanco to a libretto by Pedro Calderón de la Barca.

== Performances and recordings ==
- Television recording - Teatro Real, Jean-Claude Malgoire 2000
- Excerpts - Resonanzen 2001, Jordi Savall
