= Luis Quiñones de Benavente =

Spanish entremesista (1581–1651)

Luis Quiñones de Benavente or Luis de Benavente y Quiñones (1581 in Toledo – 1651 in Madrid) was a Spanish writers of entremés of the Siglo de Oro.

== Works ==
- La maya
- La honrada
- Los gallos
- Los sacristanes burlados
- Los testimonios de los criados
- El sueño del perro
- La noche de San Juan = [Los mariones]
- lang|spa|El miserable y el dotor
- Las manos y cuajares
- Las calles de Madrid
- El invierno y el verano
- Los escuderos y el lacayo
- El talego-niño
- El negrito hablador
- El tiempo
- El alcalde del corral
- El borracho,
- El barbero
- El burlón
- La verdad
- La puente segoviana I to II
- El tío Bartolomé
- La casa al revés
- El soldado - staged by Tomás Fernández in 1634–5
  - El mundo - another version of El Soldado
  - El mundo al revés - revision of El Soldado first published in Entremeses nuevos Zaragoza 1643.
- La visita de la cárcel
- El enfermo
- Las nueces
- Los pareceres
- Don Satisfecho, el moño y la cabellera - written after 1627
- Zapatanga
- El botero [= El cuero]
- El mago - co-produced by Tomás Fernández and Pedro de la Rosa in 1637
- Los vocablos [= El bigote]
- El Martinillo I & II
- Las cuentas del desengaño
- La paga del mundo
- El poeta de bailes
- La iglesia y el celo
