= Antoni Infante =

Spanish politician

Antoni Infante (Guadix, 1958) is a Spanish politician. He is coordinator of the Platform for the right of self decision of the Valencian country, member of Free People and promoter of the Confederation of Self-determination Organizations of the Catalan Countries.

His family was forced to migrate from Andalusia to the Valencian Country owing to economic difficulties when he was a boy. He became a communist activist at the end of Franco's times. He took part in the organization of Workers' Commissions in Torrent and other villages of the Horta of Valencia. Later he was General Secretary of Horta section of Worker's Commissions. In 1987 he took the decision of engaging himself in favour of Catalan independentism and the fight for the Catalan Countries. During this process he was a member of the Movement for Defence of the Land since 1990. In 1991 he was one of the founders of the Assemblea Unitària per l'Autodeterminació (Unitary Assembly for the Self-Determination), together with Lluís Maria Xirinacs, Carles Castellanos, Jaume Soler, Eva Serra i Puig and Blanca Serra i Puig among others. In July 1992 he was arrested and tortured during the Operation Garzón against Catalan independentism. He collaborates regularly with media from the Catalan Countries, such as La Veu del País Valencià, Levante-EMV, mon.cat, Llibertat.cat, Ràdio Klara, Lliure i Millor or València Extra.
