= Francisco Bernardo de Quirós =

Spanish entremesista

Francisco Bernardo de Quirós (1580 - 1668) was a Spanish entremesista of the Siglo de Oro.
