= Pedro Francisco de Lanini =

Spanish playwright

Pedro Francisco de Lanini y Sagredo (c.1640 – c.1715) was a playwright of the Spanish Golden Age. He was a prolific writer of both dramas and farces. He was particularly known for his many entremés. In addition to being a playwright he also worked as a censor of plays for the Spanish authorities.

Lanini completed the play, Santa Rosa del Perú, which had been left unfinished by Agustín Moreto y Cavana at his death.

== Selected plays ==
- Colegio de los Gorrones
- Darlo todo y no dar nada
- El Angel de las Escuelas, Santo Tomas de Aquino
- El parto de Juana Rana
- El rey don Alfonso el Bueno, en Parte cuarenta de comedias de diversos autores
- Entremes de la Tataratera
- Migajas del ingenio: colección rarísima de entremeses, bailes y loas
