= Guadix =

- Municipality
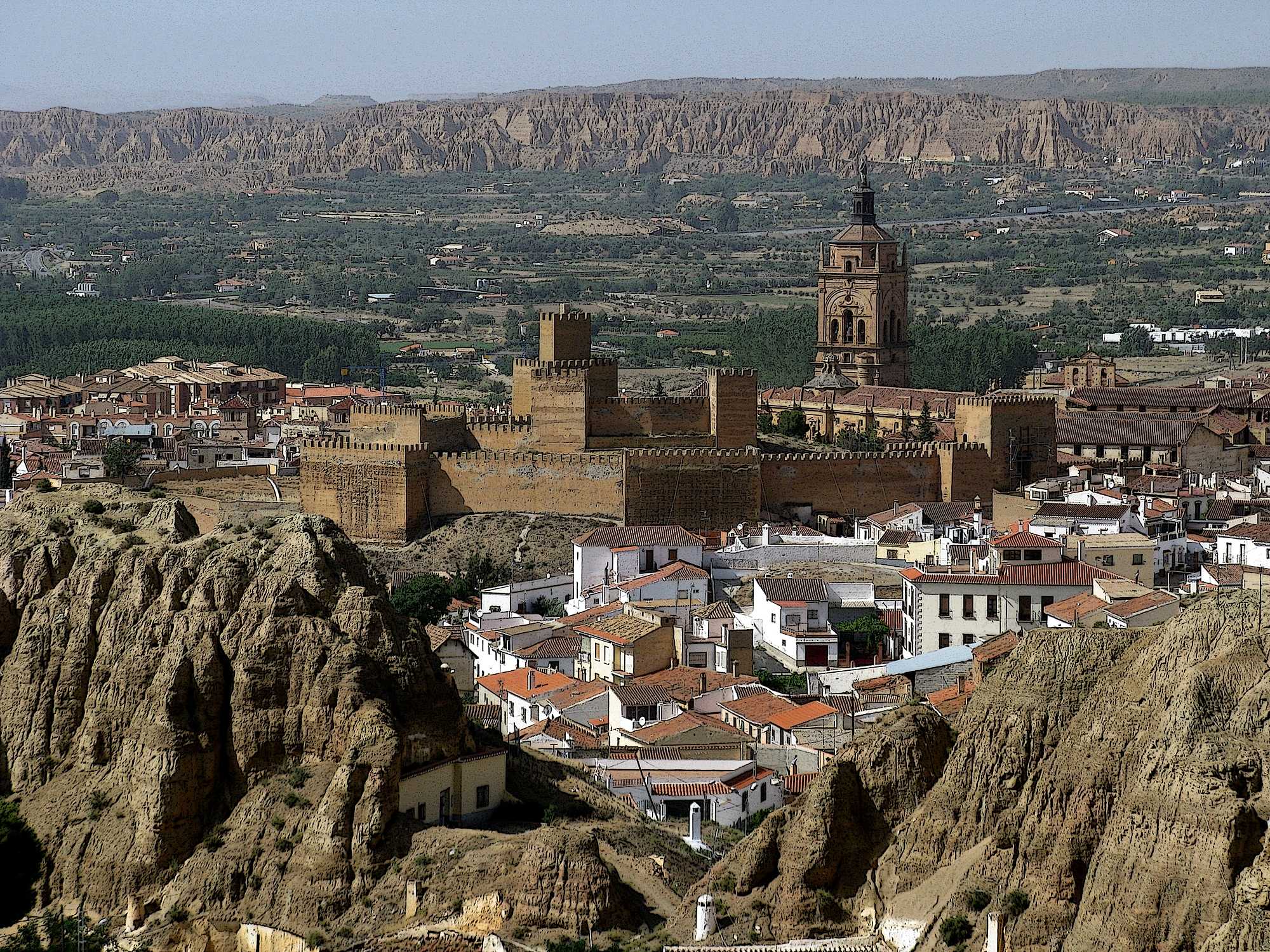

- Flag Coat of arms

- Location in Spain Location in the Province of Granada
- Coordinates: 37°18′02″N 3°08′06″W
- Country: Spain
- Province: Granada
- Judicial district: Guadix
- Comarca: Guadix

Government
  - Mayor: Jesús Rafael Lorente Fernández (PP)

Area
  - Total: 317 km^{2} (122 sq mi)
- Elevation: 913 m (2,995 ft)

Population (2025-01-01)
  - Total: 18,881
  - Density: 59.6/km^{2} (154/sq mi)
- Demonym: accitano/a
- Time zone: UTC+1 (CET)
  - Summer (DST): UTC+2 (CEST)
- Postal code: 18500
- Website: Official website

Guadix (Spanish pronunciation: [ɡwaˈðiks], locally [waˈðih]) is a city and municipality in southern Spain, in the province of Granada.

The city lies at an altitude of 913 metres, in the centre of the Hoya of Guadix, a high plain at the northern foothills of the Sierra Nevada. It is located on the Linares Baeza–Almería railway. The city was built in the vicinity of gullies and badlands.

== History ==
=== Early history ===
Evidence of human settlement in the area surrounding Guadix goes back to at least the Bronze Age.

=== Ancient ===
Guadix el Viejo, 6 km northwest, was the Roman Acci (also Accitum) mentioned in Pliny's Natural History and as Akki by Ptolemy, who placed it among the Bastetani, whose capital was Basti. It is not known for certain whether it is of Phoenician or of early Spanish origin. The existence of an oppidum with a well-defined urban plan from the 6th century BC has been documented; archeological excavations have revealed complex spaces with straight walls and red adobe floors. Kilns and silos have also been found, demonstrating a high level of development in the settlement. Throughout the Iberian era, there was a shift in planning regarding the construction methods and the alignment of residences. The importance of craftsmanship and industry in the area has been shown by the discovery of what might be an oil press below Calle Palacio. Excavations at Cine Acci have uncovered a slate dwelling from the 5th century BC.

According to Macrobius, the primitive inhabitants paid homage to Mars under the name of Neton. Julius Caesar established the Roman colony called Julia Gemella. According to tradition, it was the seat of the first bishopric in Hispania, in the 2nd century.

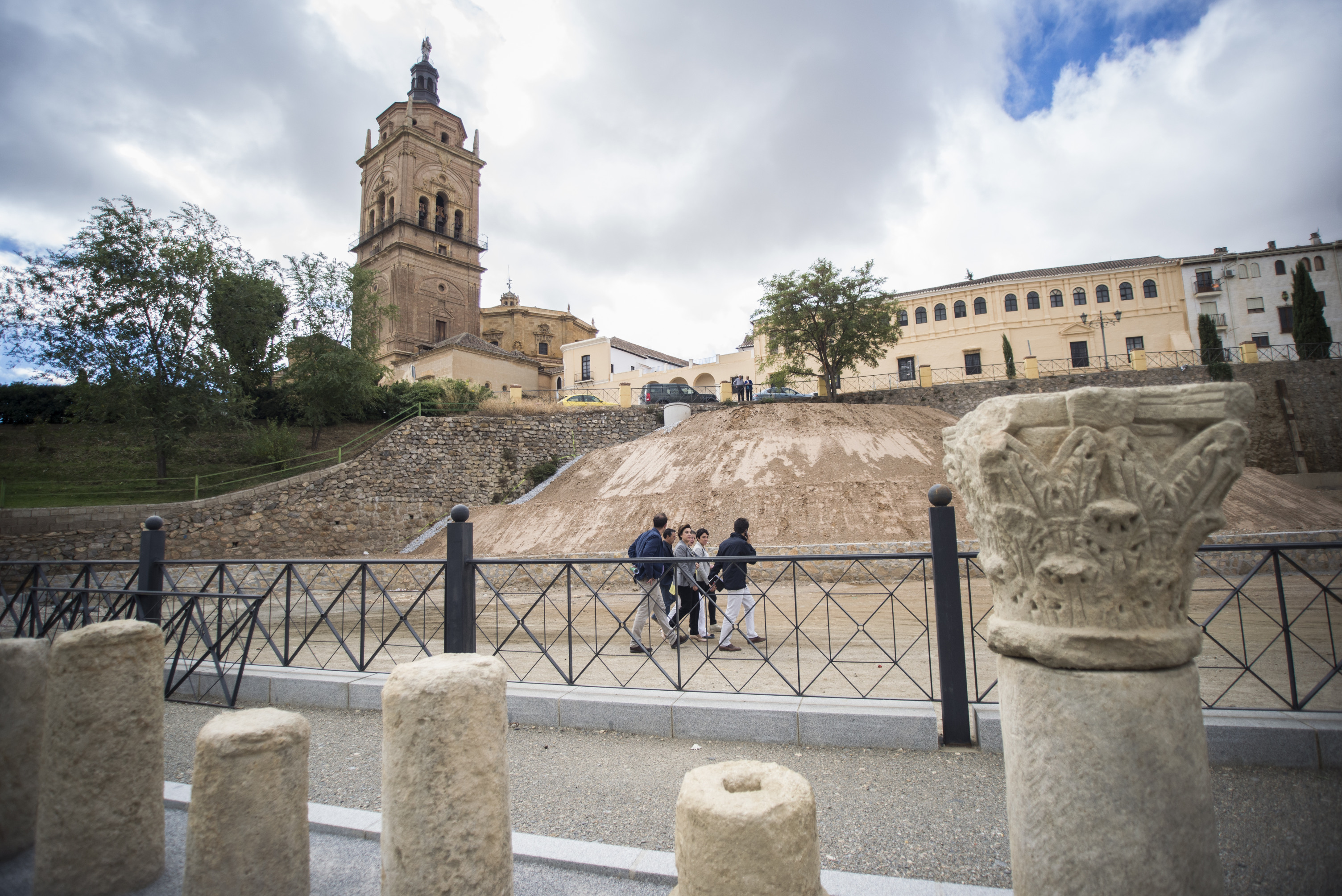
Remains of the Roman theatre of Guadix

Roman coins were minted at Julia Gemella, and the settlement continued to be an important centre of commerce, leaving artifacts such as the Pedestal of Isis, as well as the ruins of a Roman theatre. In addition, a network of sewers, galleries and water conduits have been uncovered in the city, as well as the possible remains of a Roman temple.

Acci would have enjoyed the benefits of the Ius Italicum, which would have favoured social and economic development.

The fall of the Western Roman Empire negatively influenced the status of Acci, whose population may have in large part moved to rural areas, and the city is known to have been one of the first in the Iberian Peninsula to adopt Catholicism. Few remains have been found dating from the IV to the XI century.

=== From the Moors to the Reconquista ===
After 711 it rose to some importance as a Moorish fortress and trading station, renamed Wadi 'Ashi ("the Wadi of Acci", or "The Water of Life"). According to Arab sources, the city was initially a rebel against the Umayyads, and after the Caliphate's decline, Guadix found itself located on the border between the territories of Zirids of Granada and those of the Banu Jayrán of Almería. The city was integrated into the Almoravid Empire and then by the Almohad Caliphate, which conquered al-Andalus and later left the peninsula, leading to Guadix becoming a territory of the Emirate of Granada. During this period, Guadix was home to Ḥamda bint Ziyād, one of medieval Granada's foremost women poets. The city was the site of the Battle of Guadix in January 1362 in which a small Castilian army was routed by the forces of Muhammed VI, Sultan of Granada.

The civil wars in the kingdom of Granada turned Guadix into the capital of a short-lived kingdom ruled by Muhammad XII of Granada: internal conflicts made the arrival of the Castillans easier, and the city surrendered without a siege to the kingdom of Ferdinand and Isabella in 1489.

=== Modern ===
By the end of the 19th century, Guadix had been famous for its cutlery, but its newer manufactures (chiefly earthenware, hempen goods, and hats) did not contribute to the city's economy significantly. Trade of wool, cotton, flax, corn and liqueurs took place in the city. The warm mineral springs of Cortes y Graena, once commonly frequented during the summer, are located roughly 10 kilometres west of Guadix.

The novelist Pedro Antonio de Alarcón, author of El sombrero de tres picos, was born in Guadix in 1833. The 19th and 20th centuries saw a period of economic crisis for the town. Currently, Guadix is a center of production for fruit (strawberries), cereals, and vegetables, as well as a minor tourist center.

== Landscape ==
The Hoya Basin has been subject to erosion due to the presence of small rivers in the surrounding elevations, which have given the area its characteristic landscape of gullies and badlands. The sediments of the rivers Fardes and Guadix have turned the region into a fertile, then irrigated area, where the use of the land ranges from the cultivation of fruit trees, where peach cultivation abounds, to forestry, in particular that of poplar groves, as well as the sowing of cereals, leguminous plants and vegetables.

== Main sights ==
Troglodyte cave dwellings

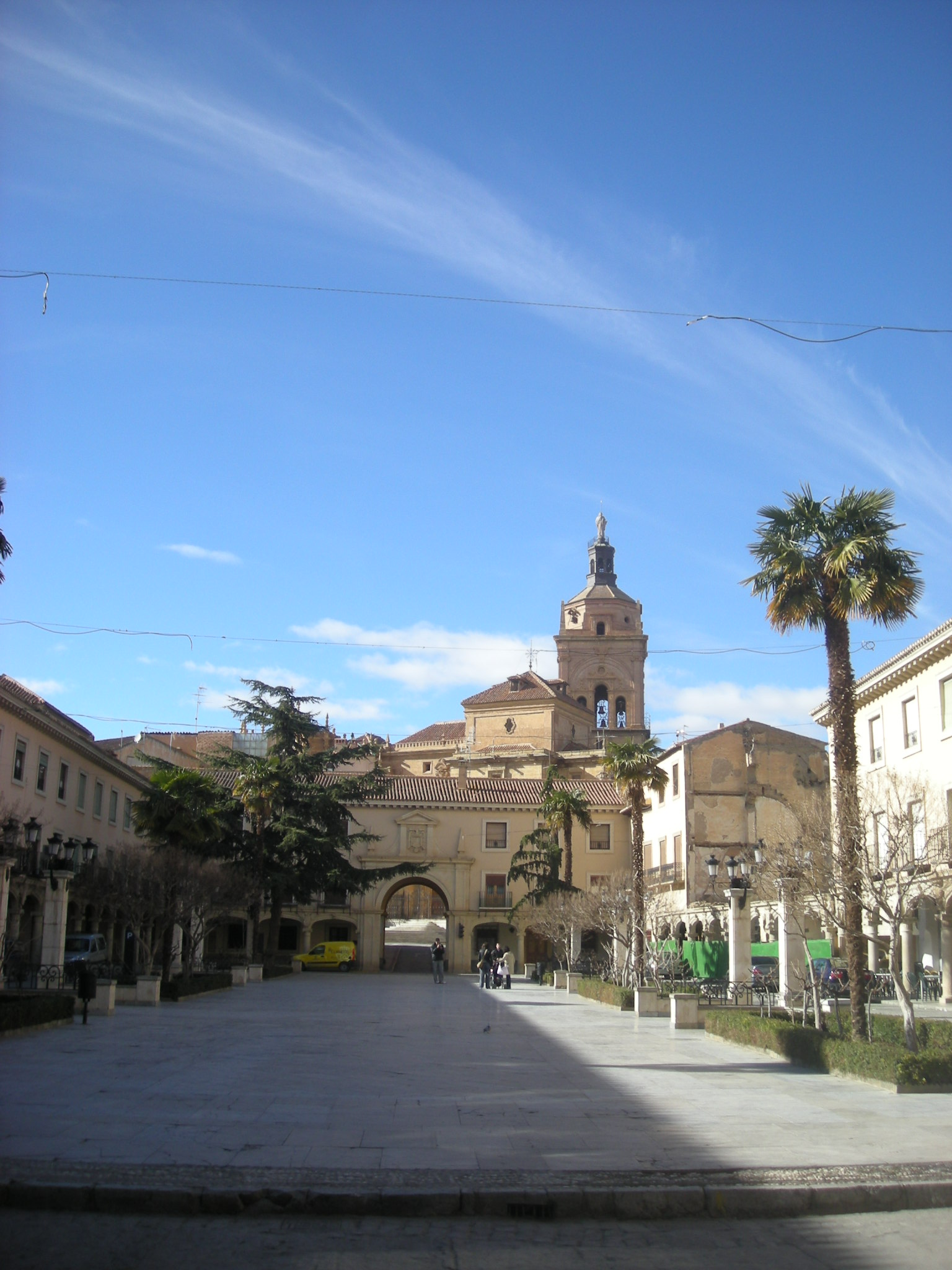
Plaza de la Constitución

- Guadix Cathedral (16th-18th centuries), built over a Moorish mosque in Gothic-Renaissance style. The façade is in Baroque style.
- Church of St. Augustine (18th century),
- Church of Santiago (1540), with a Plateresque portal
- Convent and church of the Conception
- Alcazaba, a Moorish fortress commanding the town
- Barrio de Santiago, a neighborhood characterized by troglodyte houses carved in tuff rocks

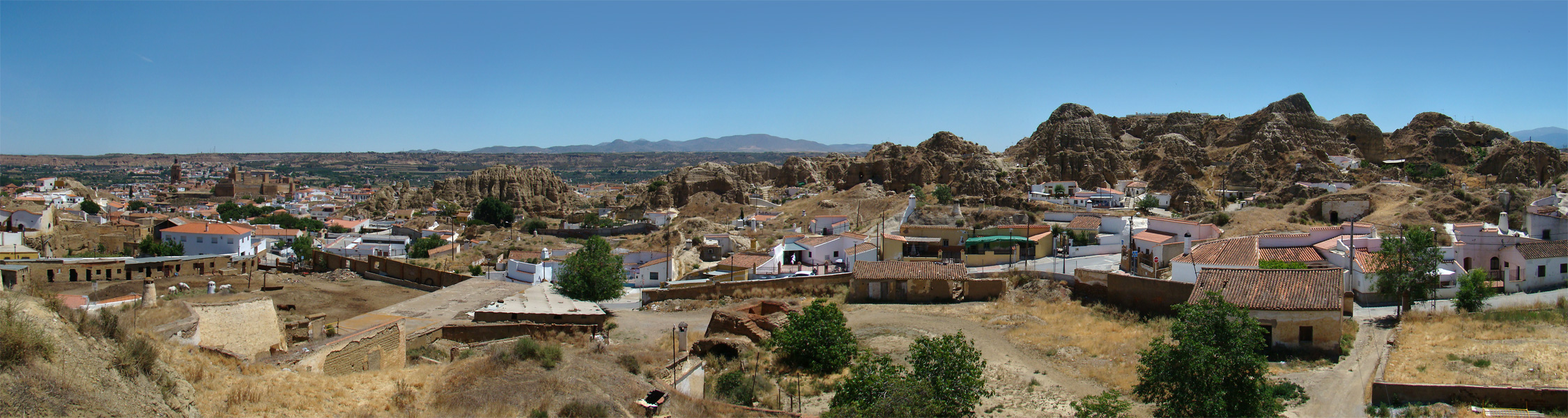
Panoramic view of the outer parts of Guadix

== Notable people ==
- Pedro de Mendoza
- Antonio Mira de Amescua
- Gaspar de Ávalos de la Cueva
- Pedro Antonio de Alarcón
- Ibn Tufayl
- Antoni Infante

== International relations ==
Twin towns — Sister cities

Guadix is twinned with:

- Celanova, Spain (since 2006).
- L'Arboç, Spain (since 2019).

Guadix has also reached a "green-twinning" agreement with Piaseczno, Poland.

== See also ==
- Roman Catholic Diocese of Guadix
- Cascamorras
- Circuito Guadix
- List of municipalities in Granada
