= Loa to Divine Narcissus =

Play written by Sor Juana Inés de la Cruz

Loa to Divine Narcissus (Spanish: El Divino Narciso) is an allegorical play written by the Mexican writer Sor Juana Inés de la Cruz, an important literary figure of the Spanish colonial period. The play was first published in 1689. The work is considered a loa, a short theatrical piece related to the longer auto sacramental. This loa is a commentary on historical events involving indigenous Aztec inhabitants and Spanish colonists. The Divine Narcissus is ambiguous not only because the Spanish do not openly explain their objectives to the native population, but also because the story equates the Christian Eucharist to Aztec sacrifice.

== Plot summary ==
Scene I: The first scene begins with the celebration held by the original inhabitants of Mexico for the God of Seeds. Two thousand believers offer sacrifices. They make sacrifices believing that this will cause the harvest to be bountiful. The characters Occident and America (both locals) have a conversation regarding their common religious views.

Scene II: The character Religion (a Spanish woman) attacks the local inhabitants' idol worship as a disgrace. She complains to Zeal (The Spanish Captain in Armor) to display more righteous anger. She demands that Occident and America abandon their idol worship and follow the true doctrine. Occident and America are startled by the challenge, but disregard her message and view her as crazy and confused. The character Zeal (a Spanish captain) stands up to Occident and America and tells them that God will not permit them to continue their crimes, and that he has been sent by God to punish them. Zeal declares war on the local people.

Scene III: Occident surrenders to Religion because of Zeal's acts of violence. Zeal wants America to die, but Religion argues to keep her alive for the purpose of converting to Christianity. America and Occident insist that they would rather live and die with their free will to practice their beliefs than be kept alive only to follow the demands of Zeal and Religion. Zeal and Religion doubt the natives' explanation, believing in the need to follow one true God.

Scene IV: Religion questions Occident and America, "What is this god that you adore?" and Occident explains the impact that their god has on their crops. Religion responds with complete disregard and America responds that there is only one God. Religion refuses to believe that they all worship the same God.

Scene V: The final scene offers another play, Divine Narcissus to inform the audience that idolatry is the devil's workshop. Religion plans on performing it in the crown city of Madrid, the royal seat of her Catholic kings.

== Characters ==
The loa presents the main characters in two pairs: Occident and America, and [Christian] Religion and Zeal.

Characters are listed in order of appearance as follows:

- Music - Featured in the first scene singing about noble Mexican origins at a celebration of the great God of Seeds. This character provides information about the native inhabitants and sets the tone of the play. Music urges everyone present in the first scene to participate in the celebration of the God of Seeds.
- America - Appears in the form of a gorgeously attired indigenous woman, who represents the local indigenous population. She is seen dressed in elaborate cloaks and tunic. This character is shown in the first scene mid-conversation with Occident. America adores the God of Seeds and is opposed to converting to Christianity.
- Occident - This character is present in the first scene and initiates conversations with America. Occident, as well as America, adores the God of Seeds and refuses to change his religious views.
- Zeal - This character is first presented in the second scene in conversation with Religion. Zeal is disguised as Commander in Chief. Zeal later confronts Occident for following idolatry and scorning Religion. He instigates punishment of the indigenous people.
- Religion – First appears in the second scene conversing with Zeal in the form of a Spanish lady. Later tries to aggressively convert Occident. Religion favors repression of the older ways of the indigenous population.
- Soldiers – These are seen later in the act and represent both native inhabitants and European invaders.

== Themes and symbolism ==
Sor Juana’s work shows apparent parallelism between her life and the struggle of the individual, specifically being for women in respect to creative fulfillment and self-expression.

Uniquely for her time, she emphasizes the idea of equality of women. She portrays feminine resistance to patriarchal domination. The majority of the loa centers on freedom of choice for the indigenous inhabitants in opposition of the Spanish invaders.

Symbols are apparent in the names of the characters, such as Music, which typically signifies prosperity, pleasure, and an expression of emotions in a positive manner.

Religion represents Catholic practice in Spain. This character is portrayed as a woman scorned by America and Occident for being crazy and confused, and they disregard her words.

America is portrayed as a proud indigenous woman. America symbolizes riches or abundance, which is later exploited and taken away by the Spanish invaders.

Occident represents the dream of fulfillment; he is seen at the top of the monarchy of the native inhabitants.

Zeal represents European colonizers who attempted to annihilate Aztec culture and religious views.

== Bibliography ==
- Barrea-Marlys, Mirta Cortés, Eladio. Encyclopedia of Latin American Theatre. Greenwood Publishing Group, 2003. 296-97. Web. 27 Nov. 2011
- Bénassy-Berling, Marie-Cécile. Humanismo y religión en Sor Juana Inés de la Cruz. Ciudad de Mexico: Universidad Nacional Autónoma de Mexico, 1983.
- Benoist, Valérie. “‘El escribirlo no parte de la osadía: Tradición y mímica en la loa para El divino Narciso de Sor Juana Inés de la Cruz.” Latin American Theatre Review. 33. (1999): 73-90. Web. 27 Nov. 2011
- Juana Inés de la Cruz. Obras completas. México: Fondo de Cultura Económica, 1976.
- ---. Loa to Divine Narcissus. Sor Juana Ines de la Cruz: selected writings. Trans. Pamela Kirk Rappaport. New York, Paulist Press: 2005. 69-17.
- Jauregui, Carlos A..“Cannibalism, the Eucharist, and Criollo Subjects.” In 'Creole Subjects in the Colonial Americas: Empires, Texts, Identities Ralph Bauer & Jose A. Mazzotti (eds.). Chapel Hill: Omohundro Institute of Early American History & Culture, Williamsburg, VA, U. of North Carolina Press, 2009. 61-100.Link to article
- Jauregui, Carlos A.. “‘El plato más sabroso’: eucaristía, plagio diabólico, y la traducción criolla del caníbal.” 'Colonial Latin American Review' 12:2 (2003): 199-231.In Spanish. Link to article
- Zanelli, Carmela. “La Loa de El Divino Narciso de Sor Juana Inés de la Cruz y La Doble Recuperación de la Cultura Indígena Mexicana”. University of California, Los Angeles, (2005): 183-200. Print.
- Cruz Juana Inés de la, Grossman, E., & More, A. H. (2016). Loa to Divine Narcissus, Scene III. In Sor Juana inés de la cruz: Selected works: A new translation, contexts, critical traditions (pp. 1526–1527). essay, W.W. Norton & Company.
