= Vicente Suárez de Deza y Ávila =

Spanish playwright

Vicente Suárez de Deza y Ávila was a Spanish playwright of the Siglo de Oro.
