= Agustín de Rojas Villandrando =

Spanish writer and actor

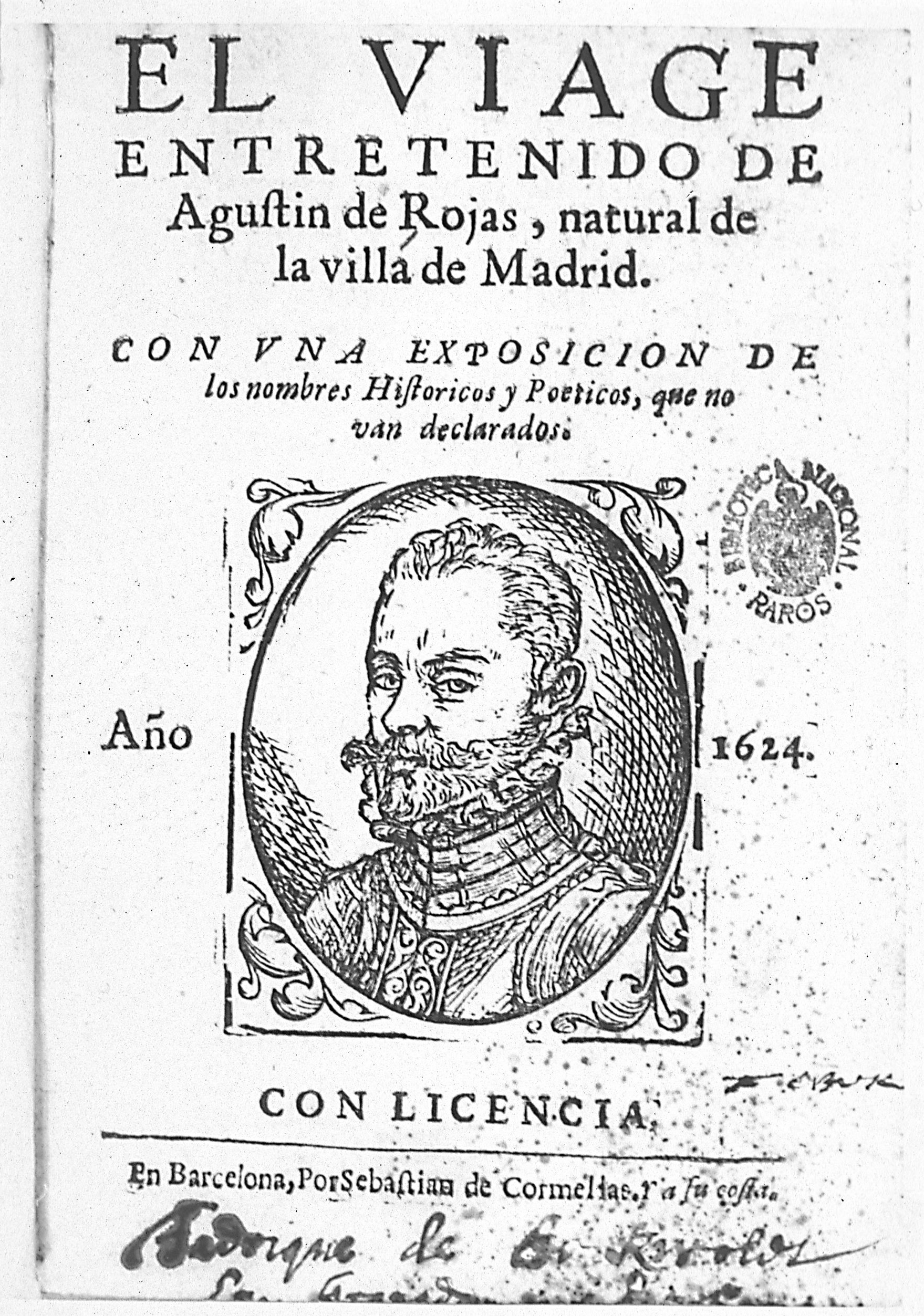
- Born: August 1572; Madrid, Spain
- Died: c. 1618; Paredes de Nava, Spain
- Occupations: soldier, writer and actor
- Writing career
- Notable works: El viaje entretenido El buen republico
- Literary movement: Baroque

Agustín de Rojas Villandrando (August 1572 – c. 1618) was a Spanish writer and actor.

== Early years ==
Rojas Villandrando was born in Madrid. He served as a soldier in France and was a prisoner in La Rochelle. He was persecuted in Italy for killing a man in Malaga and he took refuge in the temple of San Juan. He bought his freedom with three hundred ducats. He then lived in a number of cities in Spain including Sevilla and Granada.

== Work ==
As Lisa Jackson-Schebetta notes:

Rojas's career and its documentary record would be of little note, were it not for the fact that he took an authorial turn, penning not plays but rather a 700-page book entitled El viaje entretenido, in which three of the four main characters were based on some of the most well-known actors (including [Nicolás de los] Ríos) of his time. Neither Lope nor Calderón may have ever mentioned Rojas, but Lope's friends wrote dedications in the book, and dozens of theatre artists (from famous actresses to dance masters to props artisans) made their appearance in its pages. The book enjoyed multiple reprints. Its success, it seems, prompted Rojas to leave the theatre for a career as a writer.

He was also known for his loas. His work El buen republico was banned by the Inquisition because it dealt with astrology and the author was suspected of being Jewish.

== Death ==
Rojas Villandrando died in Paredes de Nava sometimes before 1635 since his wife, Ana de Arceo whom he married in 1603, was already called a widow in 1635. His last known correspondence was in 1618.

== Works ==
- El viaje entretenido ("The Pleasant Voyage")
