= Entremés =

In 16th- and 17th-century Spanish drama, an entremés (plural entremeses) was a short, comic theatrical performance of one act, usually played during the interlude of a performance of a long dramatic work. The entremés form later evolved into the sainete.

When the genre began, it was written both in prose and verse (poetry), but after Luis Quiñones de Benavente (1600–1650) defined the genre, all works were written in verse. The usual characters of the entremés were the common people; the plot usually satirized the customs and the occupations of the characters, subjects that couldn't be treated in the dramatic works during which the entremés works were played.

Sometimes the playings included songs that were the origin of another genre, the tonadilla.

Some of the most important authors of this genre are: Miguel de Cervantes, Francisco de Quevedo, Luis Quiñones de Benavente, Luis Vélez de Guevara, Alonso Jerónimo de Salas Barbadillo, Alonso de Castillo Solórzano, Antonio Hurtado de Mendoza, Francisco Bernardo de Quirós, Jerónimo de Cáncer y Velasco, Pedro Calderón de la Barca, Vicente Suárez de Deza y Ávila, Sebastián Rodríguez de Villaviciosa, Agustín Moreto, and Francisco Bances Candamo.

== See also ==
- Baile (Spanish play)
- Entremet
- Spanish Enlightenment literature § Theater
