= Noah Biggs =

Noah Biggs was an English medical reformer and alchemical writer of the middle of the seventeenth century. In his Chymiatrophilos, mataeotechnia medicinae praxes: The Vanity of the Craft of Physick, from 1651, he attacked pretentious and quack medical theories of his time. He also implied that Galenists in the College of Physicians opposed the Parliamentarian regime. He is credited with introducing the words 'febrile' and 'obesity'.

His book borrowed from John Milton's Areopagitica, and the Advancement of Learning of John Hall. He called for better diet, and criticised bleeding and other remedies of the period.; and warned against lead poisoning. It was addressed to Parliament, and asked for reform of the universities. evidences this attitude in his sharp attack on the universities of his day. It argued that medical practice should be open to all, a point also taken up by William Walwyn.

He is associated with the Paracelsians, and the followers of Joan Baptista van Helmont.
