= Mariana de Carvajal y Saavedra =

Spanish writer

- Born: Mariana de Carvajal y Piédrola; 1620; Jaén, Spain
- Died: 1670 (aged 49–50)
- Occupation: writer
- Spouse: Baltasar Mateo de Velázquez
- Writing career
- Language: Spanish

Mariana de Carvajal y Saavedra (1620–1670) was a Spanish writer of the Spanish Golden Age.

== Biography ==
Mariana de Carvajal y Piédrola was born in Jaén. She spent her youth in Granada, where she married Baltasar Mateo de Velázquez, a military man, and mayor of Hijosdalgo of the Royal Chancery of Granada. Subsequently, the couple moved to Madrid. In 1663, there is evidence that she wrote 12 comedies, which have disappeared. Some of her novels are set in the city of Úbeda. The genre of her work is referred to as the courtly novel.

== Selected works ==
- La industria vence desdenes
- La dicha de Dositea
- Navidades de Madrid y noches entretenidas (Madrid, 1663). (It is a work that includes eight novels.)
