= Antonio Mira de Amescua =

Spanish dramatist

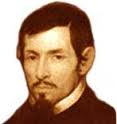
Mira de amescua

Antonio Mira de Amescua (January 17, 1577 — September 8, 1644), Spanish dramatist, was born at Guadix (Granada) about 1578. He is said, but doubtfully, to have been the illegitimate son of one Juana Perez. He took orders, obtained a canonry at Guadix, and settled at Madrid early in the 17th century. He is mentioned as a prominent dramatist in Rojas Villandrandos Loa (1603), which was written several years before it was published. In 1610, being then arch-dean of Guadix, he accompanied the count de Lemos to Naples, and on his return to Spain was appointed (1619) chaplain to the Cardinale-Infante Ferdinand of Austria; he is referred to as still alive in Montalbán's Para todos (1632), and he collaborated with Montalbán and Calderón in Polifemo y Circe, printed in 1634. The date of his death is not known.

Mira de Amescua's plays are dispersed in various printed collections, and the absence of a satisfactory edition has prevented, his due recognition. He has an evenness of execution which indicates an artistic conscience uncommon in Spanish playwrights; he resisted the temptation to write too much, and he unites a virile dignity of expression to impressive conception of character.

Two of his plays—La adversa fortuna de Don Bernardo de Cabrera and El ejemplo mayor de la desdicha—are respectively the sources of Rotrou's Don Bernardo de la Cabrère and Belisaire; Moreto's Caer para levantar is simply a recast of Mira's El Esclavo del demonio, a celebrated drama which clearly influenced Calderón when composing La Devoción de la cruz; and there is manifestly a close relation between Mira's La Rueda de la fortuna on the one hand and Corneille's Héraclius and Calderón's En esta vida todo es verdad y todo es mentira. A few of Mira de Amescua's plays are reprinted in the Biblioteca de autores españoles, vol. xlv.
