= Henry Rice (writer) =

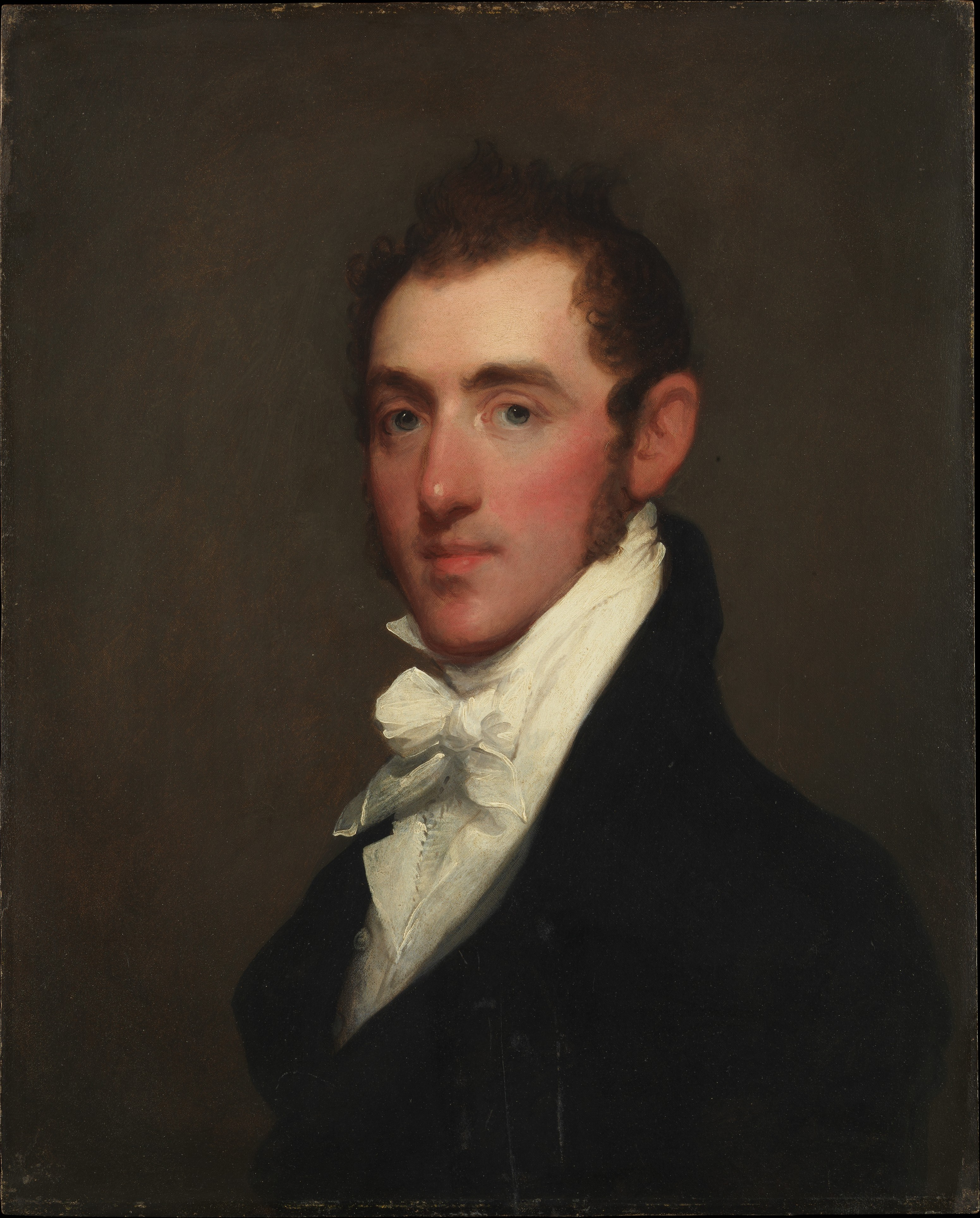
Henry Rice MET DP208350.jpg

Henry Rice (1585 or 1586 – 1651) was a Welsh writer and gentleman at the court of King Charles I.

== Life ==
Rice was part of the Rice family from Wales that included Gruffydd ap Rhys ap Thomas (died 1521) amongst its members - Rice was his great-great-grandfather. The son of Gruffydd ap Rhys ap Thomas, Rhys ap Gruffudd, was executed for treason in 1531 and his property was confiscated. Subsequent generations, including Rice's father (Sir Walter Rice) and Rice, spent much time and effort in attempts to claim back the confiscated land from the Crown. Rice himself matriculated at Jesus College, Oxford on 7 December 1607 at the age of 21, obtaining his Bachelor of Arts degree 10 days later on 17 December 1607. He became a gentleman of the privy chamber to King Charles I and used his position to present petitions for the return of family estates in 1625 and 1629. His writings included a Life of Sir Rhys ap Thomas, the father of Gruffydd ap Rhys ap Thomas and regarded as the leading member of the family, and Objections against Rice Griffith in his indictment, with the answers thereunto; both were written in the late 1620s. The Life was a significant source of information about the history of south Wales in the 15th and early 16th centuries. Rice died in 1651.
