= Băile =

Băile may refer to several places in Romania:

- Băile, a village in Balta Albă Commune, Buzău County
- Băile 1 Mai and Băile Felix, spas in Sânmartin Commune, Bihor County
- Băile Herculane, a town in Caraş-Severin County
- Băile Chirui, a village in Lueta Commune, Harghita County
- Băile Homorod, a village in Vlăhiţa town, Harghita County
- Băile Tuşnad, a town in Harghita County
- Băile Borşa, a neighborhood of Borşa town, Maramureș County, and a separate village until 1968
- Băile Govora, a town in Vâlcea County
- Băile Olăneşti, a town in Vâlcea County
- Băile Drânceni, a village in Drânceni Commune, Vaslui County
