= Mojiganga =

Colombian ska band

Mojiganga is a Colombian ska punk and Ska-core band from Medellín formed in 1995.

Mojiganga is often credited as being among the most representative bands of the Colombia's underground scene during the 90's and 2000's. They had remained independent and had put out six studio records, one live record and several singles for international compilations.

- De Las No Alpacas (1996-Never released)
- Estupidas Guerras (1997)
- Señalados (1999)
- No Estamos Solos (2001)
- Todo Tiempo Pasado Fue Peor (2004)
- Mojiganga (2007)
- Ardiendo Otra Vez (2010)
- Atomico (2013)
- En Vivo 2017 (2017)

The band has gone through several line-ups during its career but still preserve four of its founder members, they are actively playing (as of 2025) and still recording and producing videos.

== Band members ==
- Miguel Cardona: Drums (Founder, 1995–Present)
- Mauricio Agudelo (Mauro): Tenor Saxophone and vocals (Founder, 1995–Present)
- Daniel Puerta: Trumpet and vocals (Founder, 1995–Present)
- Natalia Villa: Alto Saxophone (Founder, 1995–Present)
- Jorge Conde: Bass (2011–Present)
- Alejandro Jaramillo: Guitar and Vocals (2013–Present)

Former:

- Federico Lozano: Guitar and vocals (1997-1999)
- Juan Zuluaga: Bass (Founder, 1995-2011)
- Rogelio Acosta: Guitar and vocals (2002-2013)
- Anibal Zapata: Guitar (2002-2013 - 2024)
- Guillermo Garcia (Guillo): Guitar and Vocals (1995-2001/ 2017–2024)

== History ==
Miguel, Guillo and Mauro were part of the Fray Rafael's high-school band that at the time played religious ceremonies and events organized by the school. The band, called Ensamble Cofrades did not have any original songs but its repertory consisted of rock en español covers, religious songs, and ye-ye music.

Discontented with the style and antics of the Franciscan order, Miguel (drums) and his cousin Guillo (guitar) began looking for members to start a ska-punk band, they first recruited Mauricio (keyboard) and Juan, that at the time was learning to play the bass and Natalia (alto saxophone) and Daniel (trumpet) and their name Mojiganga was officially adopted in 1995.

That same year they recorded their first album, De Las No Alpacas (1996). The album was recorded in a four track. The production and composition value of the album was so poor that the band decided to never release it and instead focus on a more professional production the next year.

At the end of 1997 they contacted Jorge Ceballos, owner of Estudios El Pez in Medellin and recorded Estupidas Guerras (1997). The album consisted of twelve songs and was released in cassette format under their label PUKA! Records.

The album's songs contained a very distinctive style of what Medellin' punk music was at the time plus the addition of a fast horn section, and gritty vocals.

The album was well received by the public and critics and positioned the band as one of the most important acts of the punk scene at the time.

The lyrics touched social issues, break-ups, anti-racism, inequality, friendship and fun times.

About 1000 official copies of the cassette were sold before it was later published with their next album Señalados (1999) in a CD format under the name Todo Tiempo Pasado Fue Peor (2004)

Señalados (1999) was their third album and first one released in CD format, it had great acceptance among the public, selling more than five thousand copies and finding distribution in other countries like Argentina and Mexico. The album was also nominated for the Shock Awards (magazine) under the category "Best Album Cover".

Their 4th album No Estamos Solos (2002) was recorded by Ryan Greene, at Motor Studios in San Francisco, California.

The production of this album, along with their first international tour marked the departure of Guillo who went to reside in the United States.

Rogelio Acosta took the role of Guillo on guitar and vocals and Anibal Zapata was also added to the band as a second guitarist. With this line-up the band performed in the most important cities of Colombia and also in other countries like Ecuador, Peru and Panama. They took part at several important music festivals like "Rock al Parque 2003 and 2010" in Bogotá and "Festival Ímpetu 2004" in Ecuador.

In 2004 they were nominated once more to the Shock awards, this time under the category "best Ska band".

Todo tiempo pasado fue peor (2004) was released in 2004 and consisted of a CD split of their first two newly mastered albums; Estupidas Guerras (1997) and Señalados (1999).

Mojiganga (2007) Was released in 2007 as a double album with one CD containing elements of mostly of ska-punk-reggae while the other hardcore-metal touches. This album put out 18 new songs and contained several hits as La Paloma, Otra Noche Mas, Bravucon del Norte and Sangre.

In 2010 with the oversight of Fermin Muguruza, they produced Ardiendo Otra Vez (2010).

The album consist of 7 cover's songs of the band Kortatu and was made as a tribute to the influential Vasque band from the 80's

Juan Zuluaga left the band in 2011 and Jorge Conde took the role as a bassist. Around that time Anibal Zapata also left and Alejandro Jaramillo joint in 2013 to play guitar and do vocals.

Atomico (2013) was released in digital format in 2013. It was recorded in El Alto Studios in Medellin. The album consisted of 11 songs with a raw sound, focused on a style of mostly punk and hardcore with horns. Mauro and Daniel are in charge of the voices throughout the album.

After a two-year break, the band returns to the stage in 2017. Several shows were announced for Colombia in 2017 and a live album was released at the end of that year. En Vivo 2017 (2017) was recorded live during their performance at the Arena Rock Fest 2017 in Medellin, Colombia.

The band has performed in Colombia several times after that and has put out some video clips in their youtube channel. The band is currently active (as of 2019) and has announced to release a new full album by 2020

Mojiganga had shared stage with international bands as The Offspring, NOFX, Less Than Jake, Los Fabulosos Cadillacs, Molotov, A.N.I.M.A.L., 2 Minutos, La Mosca and Café Tacuba, Attaque 77 among others.

They have also been included on several international compilations, the most important being: Puro skañol ("Pure Skanish"), 1998 by Aztlán Record and Mutante Vol. 1 ("Mutant Vol. 1"), 2004 by Mutante Records.

== Discography ==
=== Albums ===
- De Las No Alpacas (1996-Never released)
- Estupidas Guerras (1997)
  1. Asamblea general de los estudiantes
  2. Desplazado
  3. Juan
  4. Pancracio (cover de Skarabajos)
  5. Comun sinverguenza
  6. Skal de cerveza
  7. Ser-vicio militar
  8. Todos los fanáticos
  9. Mi negrita
  10. Estupidas guerras
  11. Viejo bar
  12. Negros (Raza unida)
- Señalados (1999)
  1. Que nadie te Pise
  2. Mi nación / Como sea
  3. Contra la pared
  4. Los radicales
  5. A mis amigos
  6. Interes cuanto vales
  7. No se metan mas
  8. Relajacion
  9. Me da igual
  10. Señorita ardiente
  11. Del sagrado corazon
  12. Sin razon no hay vida
- No Estamos Solos (2001)
  1. De Corazón
  2. Tu vanidad
  3. Vos sos todo lo que quiero
  4. El canal de la mentira
  5. Interes cuanto vales
  6. Abuso de autoridad
  7. Uno mas
  8. Miro hacia atras
  9. Hasta que muera
  10. Contra la pared
  11. Mi propia fe
  12. Autogestion
- Todo Tiempo Pasado Fue Peor (2004)
- Mojiganga (2007)
  1. Nada es igual
  2. La paloma
  3. Frio
  4. Otra noche mas
  5. Rutinas aburridas
  6. He pasado demasiado tiempo en babilonia
  7. Radicales II
  8. Best friends
  9. Iluso soñador
  10. El pasado feliz
  11. No aguanto mas
  12. Mojiganga
  13. Vuelve el miedo
  14. Bravucon del norte
  15. Sangre
  16. Seiscientossesentayseis
  17. Fieles adictos
  18. Secuestrados
- Ardiendo Otra Vez (2010)
  1. La Cultura
  2. La familia Iskariote
  3. Mierda de ciudad
  4. La linea del frente
  5. El último ska de Manolo rastaman
  6. A la calle
  7. Zu Atrapatu Arte
- Atomico (2013)
  1. Afan de fama
  2. Atrapado
  3. La vida es corta
  4. Sin garantias
  5. La buena educación
  6. 1000 cervezas
  7. dias perfectos
  8. Maldito pais
  9. Soñando con volver
  10. Libertad
  11. La +
- En Vivo 2017 (2017)
  1. Tu vanidad
  2. La familia Izkariote
  3. Asamblea general de los estudiantes
  4. Autogestion
  5. Abuso de autoridad / Negros
  6. Pancracio
  7. Libertad
  8. De corazon
  9. Sangre
  10. A mis amigos
  11. relajacion

=== Compilations ===
- Puro Skañol Vol. 3 ("Pure Skañol Vol. 3"), 1998
- Truchorama, 2003
- Mutante Vol. 1, 2004
- La música es Una ("The Music is One"), 2004
