= Baile (Spanish play) =

A baile (which means 'dance' in Spanish) or baile entremesado is a short theatrical piece in the Spanish Golden Age (Siglo de Oro) tradition. It consists of an elaborate production number with singing and dancing, and is used between the acts of a comedia. Bailes were humorous performances featuring elaborate choreography and acrobatics. Their themes were usually unrelated to the main performance during whose intermission they occurred.

Baile is closely related to entremés and mojiganga.
