= Comedia suelta =

Comedia suelta or simply suelta (From Spanish 'suelto', "loose", "separate") was a practice of printing plays as a separate edition, often simpler than that of a book with collection of plays: cheaper paper, no binding, no cover sheet, ets. The practice was popular since early 16th century onwards. It was similar to the English practice of quarto prints popular since the Elizabethan era.
