= Loa (Spanish play) =

Short theatrical piece to introduce Spanish Golden Age plays

A loa ("praise") is a short theatrical piece, a prologue, written to introduce plays of the Spanish Golden Age or Siglo de Oro during the 16th and 17th centuries. These plays included comedias (secular plays) and autos sacramentales (sacred/religious plays). The main purposes for the loa included initially capturing the interest of the audience, pleading for their attention throughout the play, and setting the mood for the rest of the performance. This Spanish prologue is specifically characterized by praise and laudatory language for various people and places, often the royal court for example, to introduce the full-length play. The loa was also popular with Latin American or "New World" playwrights during the 17th and 18th centuries through Spanish colonization.

== Purpose ==
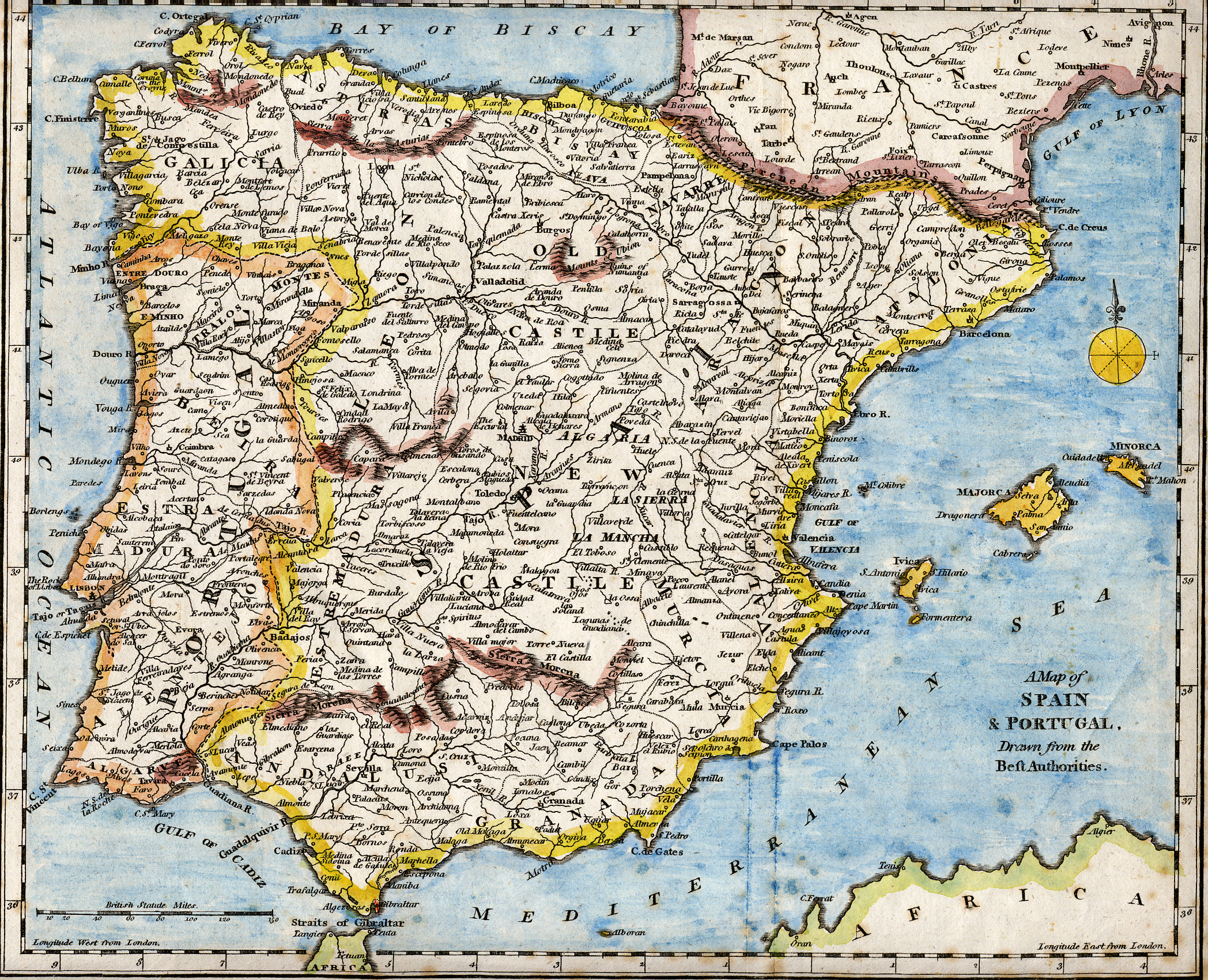
18th Century Map of the Iberian Peninsula

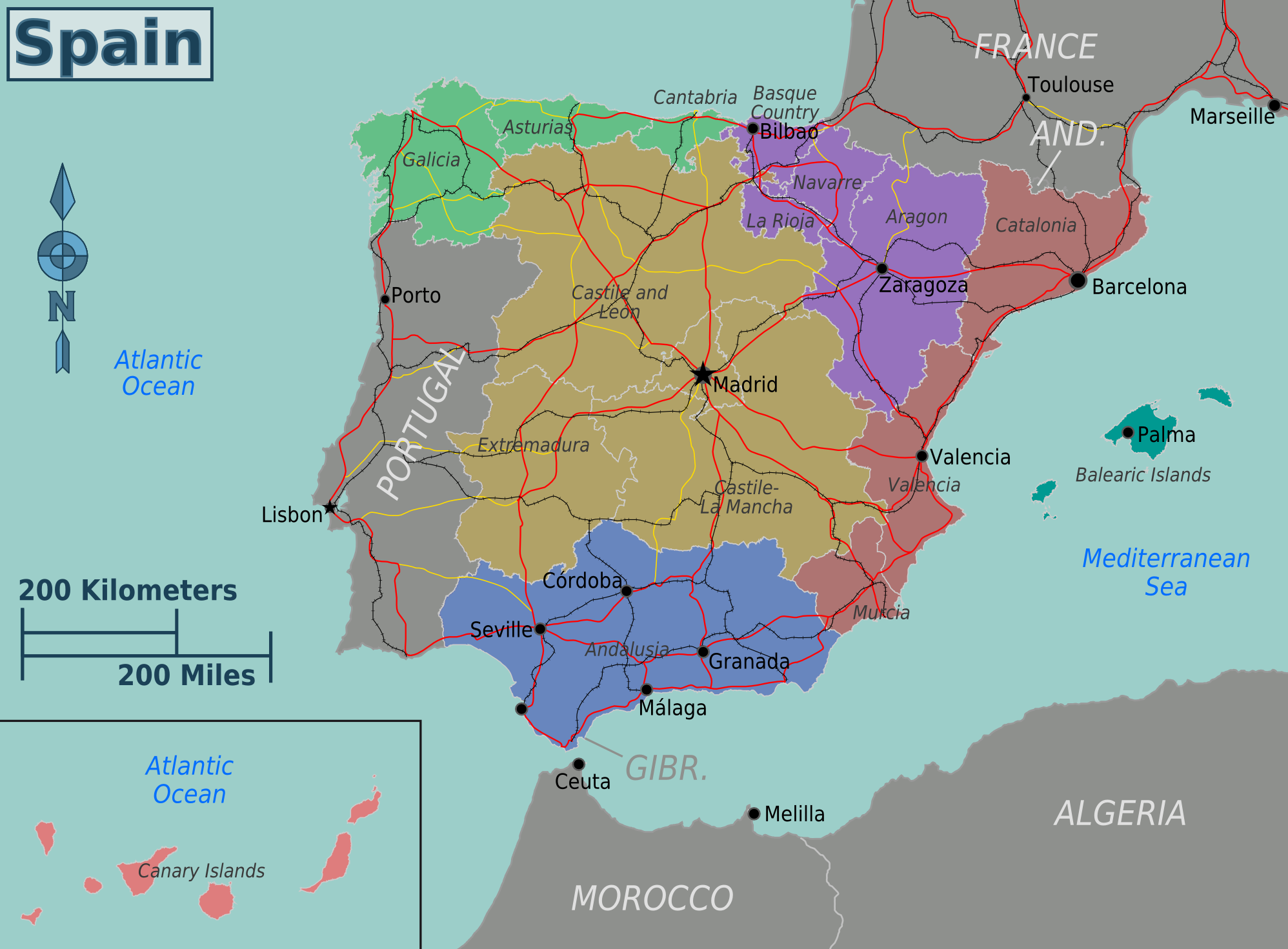
Modern Day Map of Spain

During the 16th century, public performances of comedias in Madrid, Spain would begin at 2pm in courtyards and later corrales. Audiences would arrive early and vendors would sell food. Soon these audiences would become impatient and start loudly hissing, whistling and shouting. One hour before the performance, musicians came onto the stage to sing a ballad (seguidilla) and immediately after, an actor or member of the company came on stage to "echar la loa" or "throw out praise" by reciting a loa. Most comedia playwrights (autors) also wrote loas asking the audience for silence to enjoy the afternoon of theatre.

Loas sometimes did, but often didn't have any relation to the full-length play being presented. Loas appeared in two distinct forms. The first was in a monologue form and the second was in the form of a short dramatic scene.

In order to gain the audience's attention and appreciation, one could commend the story or the author; reprimand negative critics or thank those that were positive, and the audiences present that day; discuss and argue about the play that was to be presented. The third method was not often used because audiences would be told the outcome of the play before they were able to hear it. In turn, the Spanish loa was created as a mixture of all of these methods of achieving audience appreciation before the full-length play began.

Spanish writer, literary theorist, and critic, Armando Cotarelo Valledor (1879-1950) classified Spanish loas into these five categories:

- Loas sacramentals were used before autos sacramentales, or allegorical religious plays.
- Loas a Jesucristo, la Virgen y los Santos (Loas for Jesus Christ, the Virgin Mary, and the Saints), because of their themes, were considered strictly religious used to open religious festivals and for Christmas.
- Loas cortesanas (Royal Court loas) were used in theatre festivals, sometimes represented Kings, and were used in comedias.
- Loas para casa particulares (Loas for a private house) were used to celebrate familial festivities such as weddings and baptisms and were similar to the previous categorization, but themes focused on dukes, counts, and other dignities of the time instead of Kings.
- Loas de presentación de compañias (Loas for presentations from companies) were, for example, a dialogue between with actors in the play and the playwright. These often introduced the actors and the characters they played in comedias.

== History of the Loa ==
Bartolomé de Torres Naharro (1485-1530), Spanish dramatist, is the earliest known writer of Spanish comedias and of the introductory monologue. In Naharro's volume of plays, Propaladia (published in 1517 in Naples), he uses what is called an introito as a prologue spoken by a comic shepherd. Furthermore, traces of the beginnings of the introitos are seen in medieval mystery plays of the 15th Century in Spain in the eclogues, short poems, (églogas) of Juan del Encina using a similar comic shepherd character within a Christmas play. Introitos and argumentos, another similar form of prologue used by Naharro, are both early forms of the loa that provide a summary or explanation of the comedia that follows it.

== Loas in Spain: Comedias ==
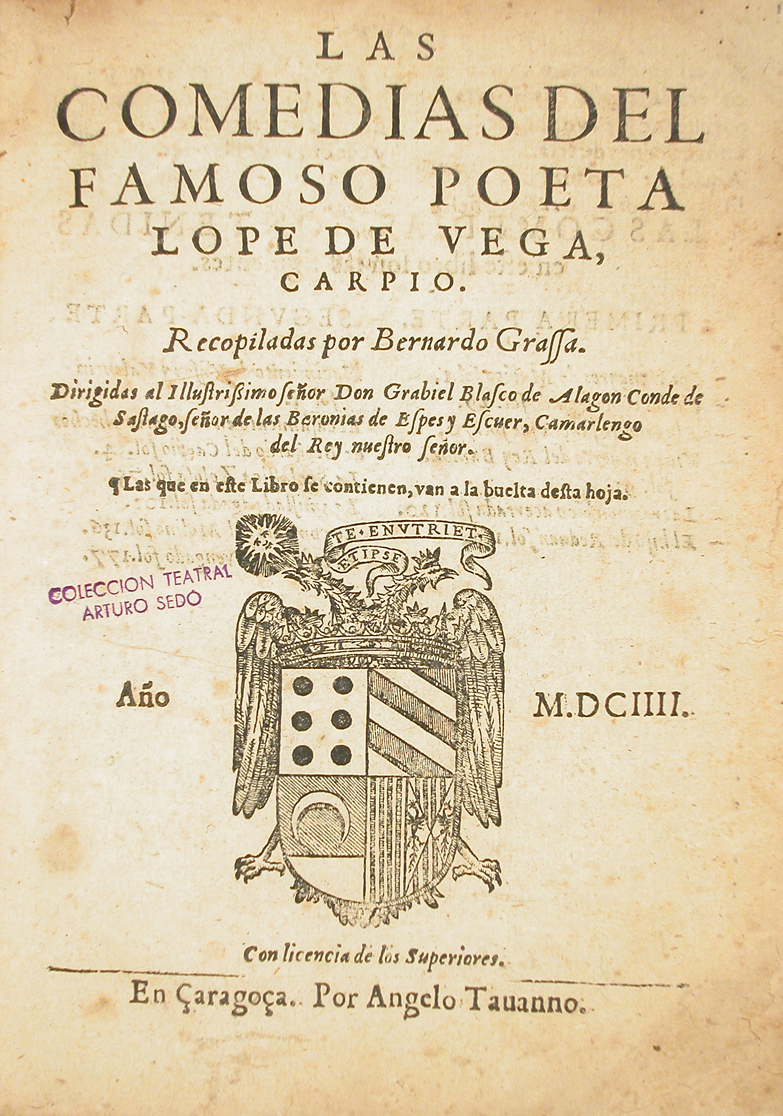
"The Comedias of the famous poet Lope de Vega, Carpio. Compiled by Bernardo Grassa. Addressed to the illustrious Señor Don Grabiel Blasco de Alagon Conde de Sastago, Señor de las Beronias de Espesy Escuer, Camarlengo del Rey nuestro Señor. The contents of this Libro (book) are at the turn of the page. Year 1604 With permission from the Superiors. In Çaragoça. By Angelo Tauanno"

Comedias of the Spanish Golden Age were secular plays and had secular loas, introductory prologues, attached to them. To be considered a Spanish comedia, a Spanish play must only be in verse and in three acts (jornadas). The content can be comedic or tragic.

Lope de Vega (1562-1635)

Lope de Vega is said to have "perfected" the Spanish comedia, but also wrote autos. The drama of the Spanish Golden Age is often characterized by his work, so that pre-Lope de Vega drama of the 16th century is said to have used the introito which was soon replaced by the loa. His loas tend to have little evident relation to the play that follows and are characterized by their playful, humorous, trivial and positive ending appeal to the audience for the rest of the performance. Lope de Vega's loas vary from 100 to 400 lines, and he is thought to have written many, but nearly all have been lost.

Agustín de Rojas Villandrando (1572-1618)

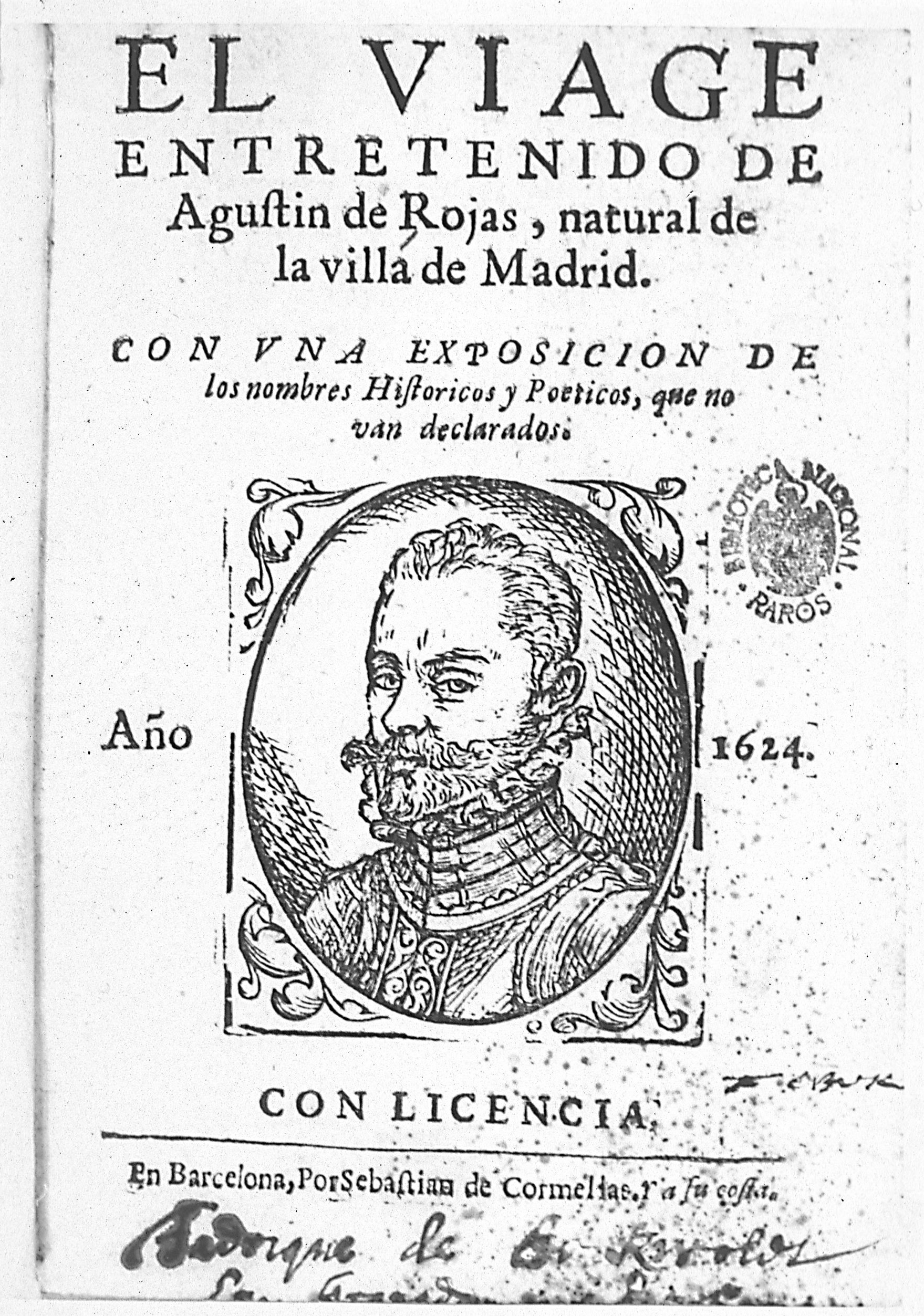
"El viaje entretenido" by Agustín de Rojas Villandrando

Agustín de Rojas Villandrano published and became well known for his loas in Entertaining Journey (El viaje entrentenido). His loas included monologues and short sketch scenes that the whole company of actors participated in. His most famous loa is the Loa en Alabanza de la Comedia.

The subjects of praise in his loas varied from praising a city, the company of actors performing, thieves, the day Tuesday, teeth and pigs.

A translation of the end of the swine praising loa:

And if long have been my praises
Of an animal so lovely,
May he who should be one pardon
Me, and therefore not feel shameful.

Published in 1604, Rojas' novel, El viaje entrentendio depicts the life of 16th century Spanish actors. It starts with characters leaving the city of Seville. Rojas writes a loa that praises Seville, which is meant to be spoken to the people of that city. In the same body of work, Rojas Villandrando also praises Lope de Rueda for his writing of the Spanish drama and of the dramatic prologue.

Lope de Rueda (1510-1565)

Lope de Rueda was a professional actor-manager who toured different town squares, setting up a stage to perform. He specifically wrote and performed an introductory prologue called Introito que hace el Autor (An Introito that the Playwright performs) and also wrote introitos or argumentos for his later plays, Colloquio de Camila and Colloquio de Timbria.

Quiñones de Benavente (1581-1651)

Quiñones de Benavente wrote loas that were dramatic sketches in which several actors and sometimes the entire company would participate in. These loas could be used to preface any comedia and were mostly unrelated to the loa. In two of his loas, he introduces the members of the company to the audience as a plea for a positive reception of the play. His loas were first published in 1645 as Joco Seria, Burlas Veras in Madrid.

== Loas in Spain: Autos Sacramentales ==
Autos or autos sacramentales were sacred plays, as opposed to the secular comedias of the time. These plays continued from medieval Christian morality and mystery plays.

Calderón de la Barca (1600-1681)

Calderón wrote loas specifically for plays that had been previously written and for his own plays that were autos sacramentales. His loas were used specifically to understand the particular play that followed. An example is in his loa to Los tres mayores Prodigos (The three biggest Prodigals). In addition to allegorical autos such as for the mystery of the Eucharist, Calderón de la Barca also wrote secular plays for the royal court that included his Loa for Andrómeda y Perseo (Andromeda and Perseus), which used scenery drawings and machinery effects created by the stage architect Baccio del Bianco.

== Loas in Latin America ==
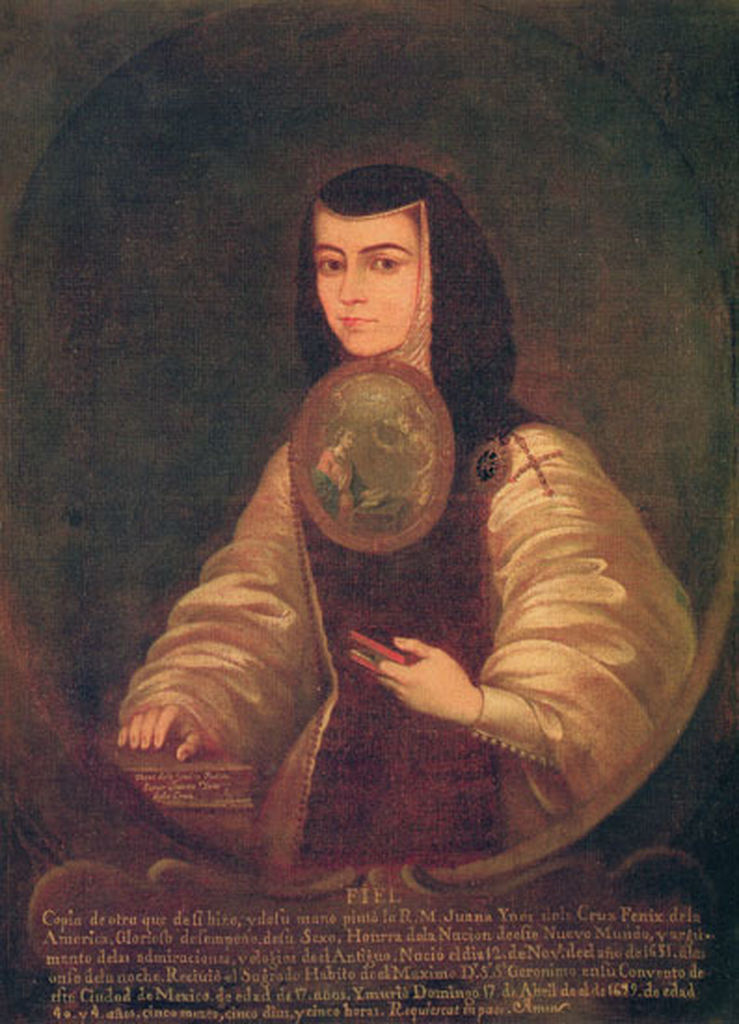
Sor Juana Inés de la Cruz- 18th Century Painting

A 1551 Peninsular Corpus Christi play shows the earliest recorded use of the word loa, as we know, regarding a dramatic prologue in Latin America. Until 1581, the loa was used in religious drama. Loas gained popularity in the "New World" by the 17th century because playwrights attached to the viceregal courts from Spain were aiming to flatter these patrons as well as the monarchs of Spain. Later 18th century "New World" loas contained some of the first references to problems in the Americas navigating class structures with the emergence of a hierarchy based on race that included Criollo, Indios, Mestizos, and more. Monologues appeared in laudatory prologues or introductions as loas in the plays of Hispanic America and are called elogios dramaticos in Brazil.

Sor Juana Inés de la Cruz (1651-1695)

Sor Juana is said to have written hundreds of loas or autos (sacred) and for comedias (secular) in Peru and New Spain but only 18 remain. She is the most prolific writer of loas in Spanish America, having written 18 of the 36 extant loas. Of the loas we have, 12 are secular, celebrating birthdays of the royal family and praising the royal court of Spain. Two more of the loas similarly celebrate secular special events, and the last four are sacred loas that promote Christian practices among the indigenous people of Latin America. The most notable of these sacred loas is Loa para el Auto de el Divino Narciso. The allegorical characters of El Occidente and La América represent the indigenous people, while the characters La Religion and El Zelo symbolize the Spanish Christians.

Fernán González de Eslava (1651-1695)

Loas by a Mexican playwright, Fernán González de Eslava were used for eight of his plays which mirrored the first laudatory style loas from Spain. González de Eslava’s loas are all in the same monologue style, opening with praise for a Viceroy in Latin America, a saint, or a sacrament. They then give a summary of the play, and always end with the request for the audience to pay attention and be silent.

Pedro de Peralta Barnuevo (1633-1743)

Peruvian playwright, Pedro de Peralta Barnuevo, wrote four known loas for royal festivals in Peru and became well known by the 18th century. The sometimes criticism of artificial praise that comes from the form of the loa is especially evident with these royal feast performances. In particular, de Peralta Barnuevo’s loa for his play Triunfos de amor y poder (Triumphs of love and power) which was commissioned by Don Diego Ladrón de Guevara, the Bishop of Quito and Viceroy of Peru uses characters of Apollo, Neptune, the winds, muses, nymphs, land, air, and sea to praise the Spanish King Philip V and Guevara himself.

== See also ==
- Siglo de Oro: Learn more about the Spanish Golden Age. (In Spanish)
- Quińones de Benavente: Learn more about Quińones de Benavente and his plays from the Spanish Golden Age. (In Spanish)
- Fernán González de Eslava: Learn more about Fernán González de Eslava, a Mexican playwright of the 17th century. (In Spanish)
- La Loa: Spanish Wikipedia article on the loa. (In Spanish)
- Lope de Vega, Agustín de Rojas Villandrano, Lope de Rueda, Bartolomé Torres Naharro: Learn more about each of these Spanish playwrights of the loa. (In Spanish)
- Armando Cotarelo Valledor: Learn more about this 19th and 20th century Spanish writer, theorist, and critic. (In Spanish)
