= Sebastián Rodríguez de Villaviciosa =

Spanish playwright

Sebastián Rodríguez de Villaviciosa (Tordesillas, Valladolid, c. 1618 - 1663), was a Spanish playwright of the Siglo de Oro.
