= Agustín Moreto y Cavana =

17th-century Spanish playwright

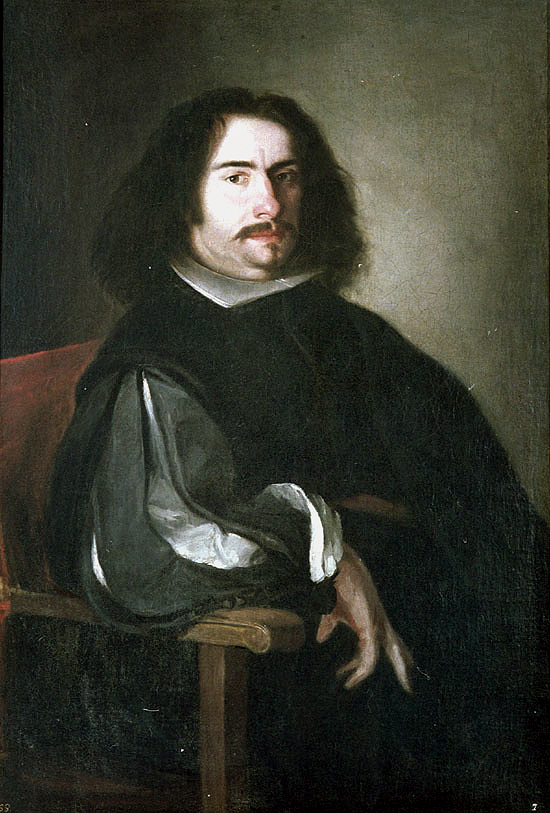
Portrait by Juan de Pareja.

Agustín Moreto y Cavana (April, 1618, Madrid – 28 October 1669), was a Spanish Catholic priest and dramatist.

== Biography ==
Of Italian descent, his exact date of birth is unknown, but he was baptized at Madrid on 9 April 1618. He attended the University of Alcalá de Henares between 1634 and 1637, studying logic and physics and receiving his Licentiate in December 1639. By 1643, he had been ordained a cleric in minor orders, with a benefice, and had also, in all probability, begun his dramatic writing. By the middle of the century he was already a recognized literary figure and a member of the Academia Castellana. He published the first volume of his comedies (called the Primera Parte) in 1654; El desdén, con el desdén (literally "Disdain with Disdain"), one of his most popular and famous comedies, first appeared in print in this edition.

He lived in Madrid till 1654, when he moved to Toledo, and became chaplain to the primate Baltasar de Moscoso y Sandoval. Sometime after 1657, Agustín was ordained a priest, at which time he seems to have cut back on his dramatic activity. At the Archbishop's request, he entered the Brotherhood of San Pedro in 1659 in order to help administer the Hospital of San Nicolás. He lived in the hospital grounds until his death ten years later, leaving unfinished his final work, a play about St. Rose of Lima. He was buried in the Church of St. John the Baptist in Toledo. His play, Santa Rosa, was completed by Pedro Francisco de Lanini. The second and third volumes of his collected works appeared in 1676.

The most celebrated of his pieces is El Desdén con el Desdén, imitated by Molière in La Princesse d'Elide, by Carlo Gozzi in La principessa filosofa, and by Schreyvogel in Donna Diana. It is characteristic that four episodes in El Desdén con el Desdén are taken from four separate plays of Lope de Vega's (La vengadora de las mujeres, Los milagros del desprecio, De corsario a corsario, and La Hermosa fea).

Moreto borrowed from Castro, Tirso de Molina and others to a considerable extent, but his adaptation shows great dexterity and charm.

== Musical adaptations ==
Emil von Reznicek wrote an opera Donna Diana in 1894, based on El Desdén con el Desdén. Its overture remains a popular concert piece. Carl Maria von Weber also wrote incidental music to the play in 1817.
