= Jerónimo de Cáncer =

Spanish poet and playwright

Jerónimo de Cáncer y Velasco (c. 1599 – 1655) was a Spanish poet and playwright of the Spanish Golden Age.

== Biography ==
Born into nobility in Barbastro, Spain (1594), little is known about his early life beyond his association with the counts of Moon and fog. He was a contemporary of prominent playwrights like Moreto, Pedro Rosete Niño, and Antonio Huerta.

He was intelligent and an improviser. He used surprising play on words in conceptually daring ways. Fray Andrés Ferro de Valdecebo described him as "the first to make puns with soul."

Cáncer wrote only two plays without foreign collaboration: Baldovinos, prohibited by the Inquisition in 1790, death and the mocedades del Cid, burlesque tone 2. The rest of his plays were written in collaboration with other authors, such as Matos and Moreto in: "Fall to lift", "the gross of Babylon", "Remedy the pain", and "The penitent adulteress". Rosete and Martínez wrote the Ark of Noah and the best representative san Ginés.

Most of these works were written to make money in a quick way, so are a combination of inspiration and imitation.
