= Juan de Matos Fragoso =

Spanish dramatist (1608–1689)

Juan de Matos Fragoso (c. 1608 – 1689), a Spanish dramatist of Portuguese descent, was born about 1608 at Alvito (Alentejo). After taking his degree in law at the University of Evora, he proceeded to Madrid, where he made acquaintance with Juan Pérez de Montalbán, and thus obtained an introduction to the stage. He quickly displayed great cleverness in hitting the public taste, and many contemporaries of superior talent eagerly sought his aid as a collaborator. The earliest of his printed plays is La defensa de la Fè y Principe prodigioso (1651), and twelve more pieces were published in 1658.

His popularity continued long after his death on January 4, 1689. Nevertheless, Matos Fragoso's dramas do not stand the test of reading. His emphatic preciosity and sophistical insistence on the point of honor are tedious and unconvincing; in La venganza en el despeño, in Á lo que obliga un agravio, and in other plays, he merely recasts, albeit very adroitly, works by Lope de Vega.
