= Auto sacramental =

Hispanic-style morality play

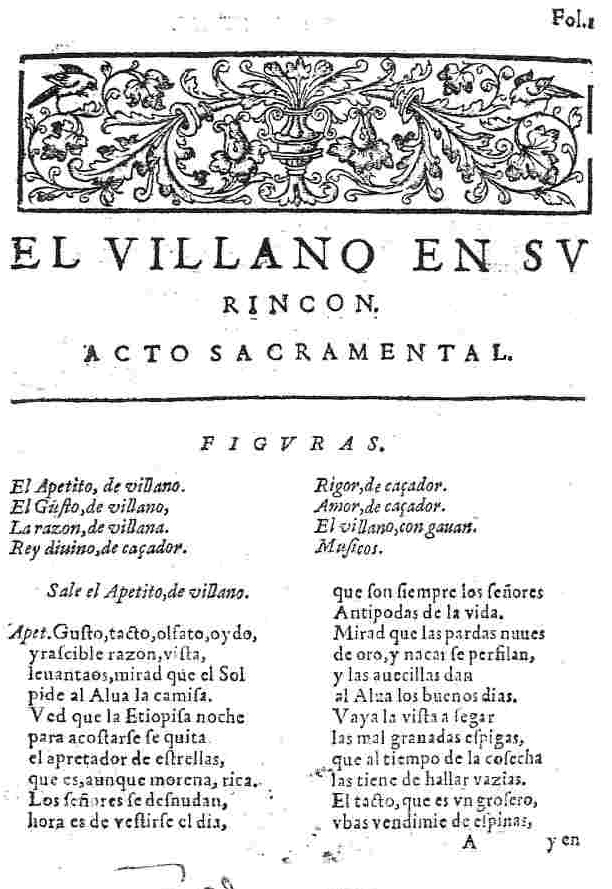
First page of El villano en su rincón, an auto sacramental by Lope de Vega first published in 1617.

An auto sacramental (Spanish for 'sacramental ordinance' or 'sacramental act'; pl. autos sacramentales) is a form of dramatic literature unique to Spain and Hispanic America. They are similar to the medieval morality plays of England and France.

== Origin and history ==
The auto sacramental may be defined as a dramatic representation of the mystery of the Eucharist. At least this is the definition that would apply to the auto of the time of Calderón. It does not so well fit, however, those of the preceding century, many of which were sacramental only in that they were presented during the feast of Corpus Christi. They are usually allegorical, the characters representing, for example, Faith, Hope, Air, Sin, Death, etc. There were some indeed, in which not a single human character appeared, but personifications of the Virtues, the Vices, the Elements, etc.

The auto sacramental was always presented in the streets as part of the celebration of the feast of Corpus Christi. It was preceded by a solemn procession through the principal streets of the city, the houses along the route being decorated in honor of the occasion. The procession was led by priests bearing the Host under a splendid canopy, followed by a devout throng. In Madrid, the throng often included the king and his court, who walked without distinction of rank. Last of all, in beautiful cars, came the actors from the public theatres who were to take part in the performance. The procession usually halted before the house of some dignitary while the priests performed certain religious ceremonies, the multitude kneeling meanwhile as if in church. At the conclusion of these, the auto was given. These performances, and the procession as well, were given with much splendor and at great expense, being limited only by the resources of the particular town in which they took place.

=== Early religious drama ===
Religious exhibitions were popular with the public in Spain as early as the 13th century. These typically consisted of simple dialogue, presented at Christmas, Carnival, Good Friday, or Easter during religious festivals. As time progressed, the celebration of the feast day of Corpus Christi became larger and with that came the desire for drama surrounding the feast day and honoring the Eucharist became apparent. The first autos were derived from religious material that already existed, but by the beginning of the 16th century, the first true auto sacramental, meaning the theme of the play was the mystery of the Eucharist, was presented. It was El Auto de San Martin, by Gil Vicente.

=== Height of popularity ===
During the 16th and 17th centuries these autos continued to appear, being gradually improved and elaborated until brought to their highest state of development by Calderón. He has left about seventy autos, the best known of which are The Divine Orpheus, a work of considerable poetic merit, The Devotion to the Mass, and The Captivity of the Ark. His autos were the most popular and were the only autos performed in Madrid from 1647 to 1681. These autos sacramentales produced a great effect on the people. From time immemorial, allegory of every kind had powerfully appealed to them, and these autos took a strong hold on the popular favor, coming as they did during religious festivals, with their music and their splendor, coupled with the fact that they were given at public expense and with the sanction of the Catholic church.

=== Prohibited ===
Citing disrespect of the Eucharist, Charles III declared the presentation and performance of autos prohibited by royal decree in 1765.

=== Modern times ===
Some modern authors, in particular those of the Generation of 27 and later, have tried to revitalize and revive the genre, sometimes desecrated it: Rafael Alberti, with El hombre deshabitado and Miguel Hernández, with Quién te ha visto y quién te ve y sombra de lo que eras, wrote autos sacramentales and after them, Gonzalo Torrente Ballester.

== Playwrights ==
Gil Vicente (c.1465 – 1536/1537): wrote in Portuguese and Spanish; considered joint-father of Spanish Drama with Juan de la Encina; wrote very early autos.

Juan de la Encina (1468 – 1529): considered joint-father of Spanish Drama with Gil Vicente; in 1496 published book called Cancionero of eight églogas, the precursor for the auto sacramental.

Juan de Timoneda (c.1520 – 1583): wrote six autos, including La Oveja Perdida; author of the only autos written in Catalan.

Lope de Vega (1562 –1635): wrote around 400 autos; 42 surviving text including The Harvest and The Wolf Turned Shepherd.

José de Valdivielso (1565 – 1638): author of the book Doce autos sacramentales y dos comedias divinas, published in 1622; precursor of Calderón de la Barca in the use of allegory.

Pedro Calderón de la Barca (1600 – 1681): considered most prolific of the writers of autos; two well-known autos are La cena del rey Baltaza, or Belshazzar's Feast and El gran teatro del Mundo, or The Great Theater of the World.

== Calderón's Belshazzar's Feast ==
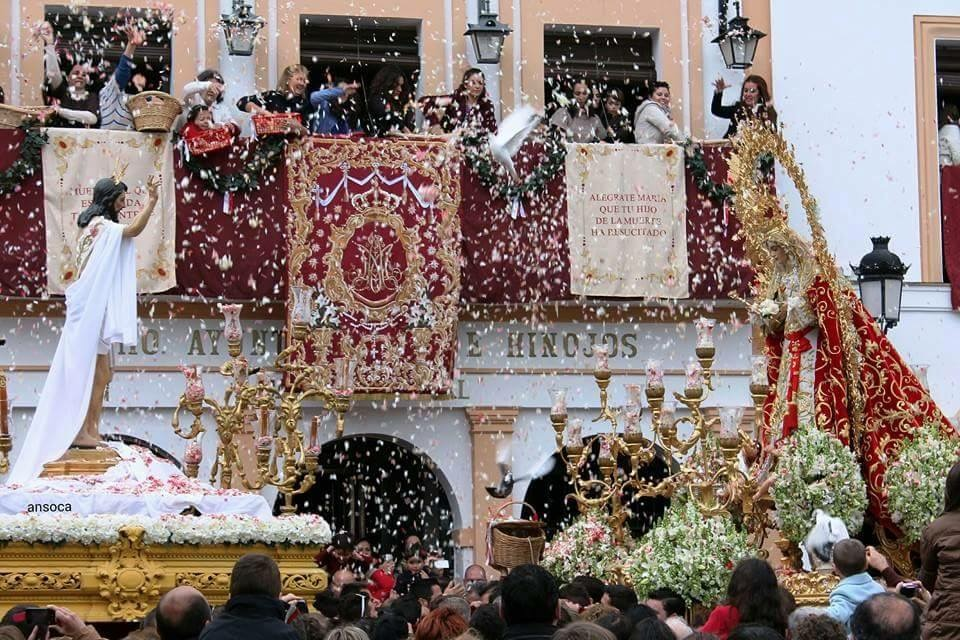
Photo from the Auto Sacramental de la Resurrección, known to the locals in Hinojos where it is performed, as "Los Abrazos," or, The Hugs.

One of Calderón's autos that is a popular English translation is Belshazzar's Feast. It relates directly to the Eucharist, sacrilegious behavior, and punishment exacted on Belshazzar for his sinful behavior.

=== Characters ===
Belshazzar – based on the biblical character, but allegorical for humanity

Daniel – Biblical historic character, allegoric personification of Wisdom and God's Judgement

Idolatry – second wife of Belshazzar

Vanity – first wife of Belshazzar

Death – allegoric personification of death; carries out judgement; key player/most important

Thought – sometimes Belshazzar's inner thoughts, sometimes general Human Thought

=== Action of Belshazzar's Feast ===
Thought and Daniel meet in Belshazzar's palace gardens. Thought informs Daniel that Belshazzar has married Idolatry, even though he is already married to Vanity. Daniel cries woe for God's people.

Belshazzar enters with Vanity and his new bride, Idolatry. He wants them to embrace each other. They do so and ask him what is on his mind. He relates the story of the Great Flood and also the Tower of Babel. After he tells his stories, his two wives decree that he is their king and god. Belshazzar asks what can break their bond, and Daniel informs him that “The Hand of God,” can break up Belshazzar, Vanity, and Idolatry. Belshazzar gets upset with Daniel and threatens his life. Daniel says that God will save him. Vanity and Idolatry tell Belshazzar that Daniel is annoying them and they want to leave. As they leave, Belshazzar tells Daniel he owes his life to the two queens, not to God. Thought tells Daniel that he has learned a valuable lesson – by invoking the hand of God, his life can be spared in future situations.

Death and Daniel enter and discuss Belshazzar and his sins of vanity and idolatry. Death offers to kill Belshazzar for Daniel, as an agent of an angry God. Daniel gives Death permission to visit Belshazzar and scare him, but not kill him. Daniel wants to save his soul. Death is upset about only being allowed to show himself to and warn Belshazzar and not take his soul. He calls for Thought. Thought joins Death and is scared of him. Death asks Thought where Belshazzar is. Thought tells Death that Belshazzar is with his two wives in the garden. Death asks Thought to take him there. Thought does because he doesn't have the courage to say no.

Belshazzar, Idolatry, and Vanity enter. They ask Belshazzar why he looks so sad and stops talking so suddenly. Belshazzar says he doesn't know the source of the intense pain he feels. It is Death approaching that none of the trio can see. Death shows himself to Belshazzar who is shocked and terrified. He asks Death who he is; Death tells Belshazzar that he is a creditor here to collect a debt that Belshazzar owes. Thought rethinks his decision to lead Death to Belshazzar. Belshazzar asks what he owes. Death shows him a book that has the debt listed, but Belshazzar states that the book is one he lost. Death says the debt was written down by Belshazzar himself. He reads back what Belshazzar wrote about owing his life to Death. Death tells Belshazzar that today is not the day that he has come to collect the debt, but that the day is coming. Death exits.

Belshazzar, Idolatry, Vanity, and Thought are still together. The two queens want to know what is troubling Belshazzar. He says he is not sure – some phantom visited him. To please Belshazzar, the queens take turns complimenting each other. They all sit down and Idolatry fans Belshazzar with the feather from her hat while Vanity sings to him about his greatness to continue to soothe him.

Death is angry because the queens have soothed Belshazzar into a sleep. Death says he will haunt Belshazzar in his dream. The queens leave the garden and Thought also falls asleep. Death sees Belshazzar asleep and decides to kill him. He draws his sword, but Daniel enters and says, “No,” while holding back the arms of Death. Death inquires why he cannot kill the king. Daniel says Belshazzar has not lived his whole life and it is not time yet for him to die. Death argues that Belshazzar's life is a mockery to both God and Death.

While Belshazzar is asleep, in his dream the queens enter with a Statue – it is Belshazzar as a god. The queens praise Belshazzar and build him up. The Statue warns Belshazzar in his sleep that he needs to leave Idolatry and Vanity behind or else he will suffer because of them. The Statue tells the dream queens that the great God decrees them gone. Belshazzar wakes up and is troubled by what he saw and felt in his sleep. He starts to question keeping so much stock in Idolatry and Vanity. However, Idolatry seduces him again and he returns to his former self. Thought suggests Belshazzar throw a feast to shake off all of the melancholy. Belshazzar calls for the gold wine glasses and wine reserved for presenting the Eucharist to be used, because he deserves the best. Idolatry and Vanity set the table for the feast while Thought sings.

Death comes to the feast in a disguise and makes a plea to God to loose his hand in order to kill Belshazzar due to his sacrilegious behavior against the Eucharist on top of his sins of Idolatry and Vanity. Belshazzar demands wine, and Death, being mistaken for a servant, brings him a golden cup of poisoned wine declaring that in the cup is both Life and Death. Belshazzar toasts himself, drinks the wine, and then there are several increasingly loud thunderclaps. A hand appears in the clouds and writes nonsense words that neither Idolatry, Vanity, Belshazzar, nor Thought can decipher. Idolatry says Daniel can read them and calls him to do it.

Daniel comes and interprets the words that translate to mean that: One, God has numbered Belshazzar's days on earth. Two, Belshazzar has been weighed in the balance and been found wanting. Three, Belshazzar's kingdom will be a wasteland ravaged by his enemies when Belshazzar dies. All this because Belshazzar has profaned the sacred golden sacramental cups meant only to be used for the Eucharist. Death tells Belshazzar know that there was “death,” or poison, in the cups. Belshazzar cries out for Idolatry to save him, but she cannot. He calls out to Vanity to help him, but she cannot. Belshazzar asks Thought to help him, but Thought reminds him that he did not take heed of the warnings he received. Belshazzar finally calls on Daniel. Daniels says he is God's agent and Belshazzar must take his punishment. Belshazzar wonders who could save him – Death says no one. Death says “Die, thou sinner,” draws his sword, and stabs Belshazzar in the heart. As Death and Belshazzar wrestle, Belshazzar calls out a warning to all men. Idolatry lays down her worship of all other gods for God Himself, asks for forgiveness for Calderón's faults, and says that his intentions as the playwright was to point back to God.

== See also ==
- Corpus Christi (feast)
- Spanish Golden Age theatre
