= Festival de Beaune =

The Festival de Beaune: Festival international d’opéra baroque is a month-long annual summer festival of baroque opera in Beaune, France. It is notable for revivals of many baroque operas and performances of Mozart on original instruments.

More recently the town has also become host, in a different week, to the Festival international du film policier de Beaune - a festival of detective films.

Founded in 1982, the Baroque Music Festival of Beaune has presented over 80 operas, over 30 of them significant revivals and world, European or French premières; over 100 oratorio and sacred music concerts, including 5 revivals or premières. In addition to recitals by individual performers. The festival also runs classes and voice workshops, the Académie de Chant baroque.

== Venue ==
The concerts take place in the Hospices de Beaune, 15th century, and in the Collégiale Notre-Dame de Beaune, 12th century, over four weekends in July.

== Notable opera revivals ==
The following includes only major revivals and premières:

1988

- Marc-Antoine Charpentier: Actéon. dir. William Christie.

1990

George Frideric Handel: Flavio. dir. René Jacobs

1993

George Frideric Handel: Scipione. dir. Christophe Rousset

- Campra: l’Europe Galante. Marc Minkowski

1994

- George Frideric Handel: Poro. dir. Fabio Biondi

1995

- George Frideric Handel: Riccardo Primo. Christophe Rousset

1994

- Niccolò Jommelli: Armida abbandonata. Christophe Rousset

1995

- Nicola Porpora: Arianna in Nasso. Rinaldo Alessandrini

1996

- Jean-Baptiste Lully: Acis et Galatée. Marc Minkowski

1997

- Tommaso Traetta: Antigona. Christophe Rousset
- Antonio de Literes: Los Elementos. Eduardo López Banzo

1998

- George Frideric Handel: Admeto. Christophe Rousset
- Jean-Philippe Rameau: Zoroastre. William Christie

1999

- Henri Desmarets: Didon. Christophe Rousset
- Antonio de Literes: Acis y Galatea. Eduardo López Banzo

2001

- Jean-Baptiste Lully: 'Persée. Christophe Rousset
- Francesco Cavalli: I Strali d’Amore. Gabriel Garrido

2003

- Giovanni Battista Pergolesi: L'Olimpiade. Ottavio Dantone

2004

- Giovanni Battista Pergolesi: Il Flaminio. Ottavio Dantone

2005

- Francesco Bartolomeo Conti: Don Quichotte in Sierra Morena. René Jacobs.

2008

- Domenico Scarlatti: Ottavia restituita al trono. Cappella della Pietà de Turchini, Antonio Florio.
- Giovanni Battista Pergolesi: Adriano in Siria. Ottavio Dantone.

2009

- No premieres - Handel celebration: Ariodante F. M. Sardelli; Giulio Cesare E. Lopez Banzo;
  Rinaldo O. Dantone; Acis and Galatea P. McCreesh.

2010

- Jean-Baptiste Lully: Bellérophon composed 1697, unperformed. Les Talens Lyriques, dir Christophe Rousset

2011
29th Rameau Dardanus 1744, Porpora Semiramide riconosciuta (Porpora) Stefano Montanari,
2012
30th Vivaldi Orlando Furioso 1714, Septem verba a Christo René Jacobs
2013
31st Festival - L'incoronazione di Dario Dantone Amadis (Lully) Rousset Orlando Jacobs
2014
32nd - Handel Teseo and Serse, Rameau Zaïs and Castor et Pollux
2015
33rd Nicola Porpora Il Trionfo della divina Giustizia Lully Armide
2016
34th - Rameau Zoroastre, Vivaldi Tamerlano
2017
35th Festival - Alessandro Scarlatti: Mitridate, Handel Ottone, Lully Alceste
2018
36th Rodrigo (Handel) Giustino (Vivaldi)
