= Sebastián Durón =

Spanish composer

Sebastián Durón (19 April (baptized) 1660 – 3 August 1716) was a Spanish organist and composer of the Baroque period. Sebastián Durón Picazo was, with Antonio de Literes, the greatest Spanish composer of stage music of his time.

== Life and career ==
Durón was born in Brihuega, Guadalajara, Spain, and was the eldest child of two younger brothers and three sisters. His father, Sebastián Durón, was the church sacristan of Brihuega. Diego Durón, Durón's half-brother, was also a composer. Sebastián Durón began his musical training with Andrés de Sola, who was the lead organist at La Seo Cathedral in Zaragoza. In 1679, Durón briefly took on the role of paid assistant to Sola before becoming the second organist at Seville Cathedral. He served in Seville until 1685, composing sacred music and villancicos while taking minor holy orders. Due to financial reasons, Durón moved to Burgo de Osma Cathedral as first organist, where he was given a stipend and a salary. In 1686, he accepted a more profitable position at Palencia Cathedral where he taught and composed for five years.

Sebastián served as organist and choirmaster at various cathedrals (Seville, Cuenca, El Burgo de Osma, Plasencia) until in 1691, when he was appointed organist of the Royal Chapel of King Charles II in Madrid. By 1697, Durón had earned a strong reputation at court for his unmatched sacred and theatrical compositions. The new king King Philip V appointed him chapel master of this institution in 1701. He remained in this position until 1706, when he was suspended because of expressing support for Archduke Charles of Austria during the War of Spanish Succession, which ended with the victory of Bourbon King Philip V. In early 1707, he attempted to remove valuable scores, which included his own works, from the royal chapel music library. This led to further disgrace, forcing Durón into exile in France. In 1715 he was appointed chaplain to the exiled queen Maria Anna of Neuburg, the widow of Charles II, in Bayonne. He died in 1716 of tuberculosis at Cambo-les-Bains, Aquitaine, France.

== Music and Influence ==
=== Sacred and Secular ===
Sebastián Durón composed many works of both sacred and secular music. While many of his Latin sacred pieces are traditional of Counter-Reformation Spain, others, like his motets, demonstrate a more progressive style. This can be seen through their unique textures and instrumentation. His villancicos are inspired by the legacy of earlier Spanish Baroque composers, like Juan Hidalgo, while still employing new techniques and expressive effects. Durón wrote both large and small pieces for voice and instruments, giving his sacred villancicos a theatrical touch representative of his stage works.

=== Zarzuela ===
Although Durón composed many sacred pieces, and these and his villancicos were taken to the New World, his main influence was in the zarzuela. Durón's earliest known stage work was the zarzuela Salir el amor del mundo, and his last was Veneno es de amor la envidia. This final theatrical composition premiered in Madrid from 1710-1711 alongside two other zarzuelas composed by Durón. It was very successful despite his exile in 1707, suggesting that he sent works to Madrid from exile or left copies behind. From 1718 to 1723, Durón's zarzuelas circulated and were performed in Lisbon. His cantatas and theatrical songs are kept in copies in Latin America sources.

The zarzuela, las nuevas armas de amor, premiered in 1711 with the intention of being the top performance of the season. Its characters highlighted talented actors with skills such as performing comedic text or even fully sung roles. The lavish set of the show created breathtaking visuals that were only enhanced by the music itself. The dramatist was José de Cañizares. Durón was a skilled composer, and this can be seen in his thoughtfulness towards the characters emotional journey. Using large leaps, chromaticism, tonicizations, and many other musical techniques, Durón is able to reflect the meaning of the text as well as the depth of each character.

=== Opera ===
Durón's La guerra de los gigantes, written for the Count of Salvatierra, is based on the myth of the giants revolt against the Olympus gods. There is no surviving libretto and little recitative, suggesting that the one-act work likely combined music and spoken dialogue, resembling a zarzuela. The music was set both in strophic form as well as in four-part choruses, while spoken roles were used to further the dramatic development of the characters. This mixed format also appears in Durón's Veneno es de amor la envidia, where the supernatural characters only sing.

== Legacy ==
Sebastián Durón's impact on Spanish theatre music was significant, reflecting a blend of Spanish and foreign styles that shaped early 18th century Madrid. After his death in 1716, his music remained controversial. Father Benito Jerónimo Feijoo (1676–1764) criticised Durón, compared to Literes, for the worldliness of his compositions. Durón's critics believed he compromised the traditional Spanish style by using foreign influences.

== Works ==
=== Stage Works (Zarzuelas and Operas) ===
- 1696 Salir el amor del mundo (libretto by ¿José de Cañizares?). Zarzuela in two acts.
- ca. 1696-99 Apolo y Dafne (libretto by José Benavides). Zarzuela.
- 1697 Muerte en amor es la ausencia (libretto by Antonio de Zamora). Mythological Comedy in three acts.
- c. 1697 Selva encantada de amor. Zarzuela in two acts.
- c. 1701 La guerra de los gigantes. 1 act.
- 1704 Hasta lo insensible adora (libretto by José de Cañizares). Zarzuela in two acts.
- c. 1705 Apolo y Dafne (anonymous libretto). Zarzuela in two acts (first act contains the music of Navas).
- c. 1705 Coronis (libretto by an anonymous poet). Zarzuela in two acts.
- 1711 22 January (revival date . Premniere c. 1706)Veneno es de amor la envidia (libretto by Antonio de Zamora, possibly with the participation of José Cañizares). Zarzuela in two acts: Madrid.
- 1711 25 December (revival date. Premniere c. 1702) Las nuevas armas de amor (libretto by José de Cañizares). Zarzuela in two acts: Madrid.

=== Sacred ===
- Ave maris stella
- Dios te salve María
- Dixit Dominus
- Ego sum resurrectio
- Letanía de los santos
- María: in idirem ungüentorum tuorum
- Responsorio de difuntos
- Salve Regina

== Selected discography ==
- Tonadas (Songs), Raquel Andueza. Naxos.
- selections on Barroco Español, Vol. 2, Vol. 3, by Al Ayre Español, cond. Eduardo Lopéz Banzo. DHM
- Lágrimas, Amor - Arias for Soprano—Eva Juárez, A Corte Musical, Rogério Concalves Pan Classics, 2016
- Durón: La guerra de los gigantes— Granada Baroque Orchestra & Íliber Ensemble, Darío Moreno & Darío Tamayo IBS Classical, 2019
- Coronis - Le poème harmonique, Vincent Dumestre Outhere, 2022

== Bibliography ==
- Hudson, Barton (1961), A Portuguese Source of Seventeenth-Century Iberian Organ Music, PhD, Indiana, Indiana University.
- Siemens Hernández, Lothar (1967), Six Tientos: Andrés de Sola y Sebastián Durón, Paris, Éditions musicales de la Schola Cantorum, Orgue et Liturgie, n.º 74.
- Verdú, Paulino Capdepón; Juan José Pastor (eds.), (2013), Sebastián Durón y la música de su época. Vigo: Editorial Académica del Hispanismo.

On Durón's zarzuelas:

- Acuña, Maria Virginia (2020), “‘May she who was once beautiful be transformed into a monster:’ Magic and Witchcraft in Envy is the Poison of Love (Madrid, 1711),” Early Music 48(3): 377–90.
- Acuña, Maria Virginia (2018), “Love Conquers All: Cupid, Philip V, and the Allegorical Zarzuela during the War of the Spanish Succession (1701–16),” Eighteenth-Century Music 15(1): 29–45.
- Acuña, Maria Virginia (2017), “Sobbing Cupids, Lamenting Lovers, and Weeping Nymphs in the Early Zarzuela: Calderón de la Barca’s El laurel de Apolo (1657) and Durón and Navas’s Apolo y Dafne (ca. 1700),” Bulletin of the Comediantes 69.2, 69–95.
- Szulim, Lukasz R (2010), "Dos zarzuelas de Sebastián Durón: Salir el Amor del mundo (1696) y El imposible mayor en amor le vence Amor (1710): cómo cambiaba el género zarzuelístico en España a caballo entre los siglos XVII-XVIII", en La cultura del Barroco español e iberoamericano y su contexto europeo, Varsovia, Uniwersytet Warszawski Instytut Studiów Iberyjskich i Iberoamerykanskich, pp. 689-694.
