= Rodrigo (opera) =

1707 opera by George Frideric Handel

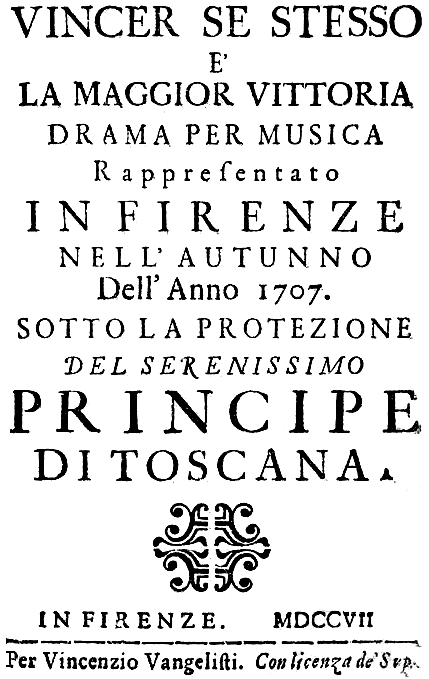
title page of the libretto

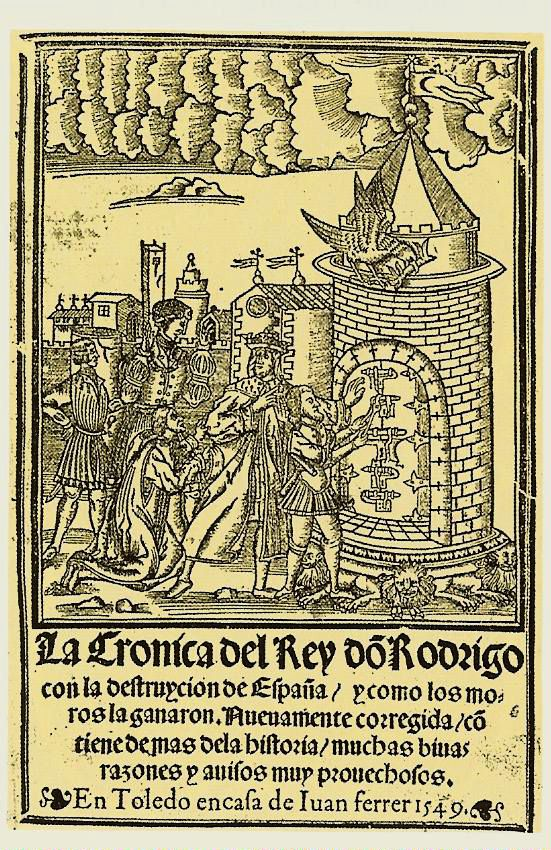
Titlepage of La Crónica del rey don Rodrigo (The Chronicle of the Lord King Roderic) published by Juan Ferrer (1549), recounting the legendary deeds of Rodrigo

Rodrigo (HWV 5) is an opera in three acts composed by George Frideric Handel. Its original title was Vincer se stesso è la maggior vittoria ("To overcome oneself is the greater victory"). The opera is based on the historical figure of Rodrigo, the last Visigothic king of Spain. The libretto was based on Francesco Silvani's II duello d'Amore e di Vendetta ("The conflict between love and revenge"). Dating from 1707, it was Handel's first opera written for performance in Italy, and the first performance took place in Florence late in 1707.

The opera was revived in 1984, in Innsbruck. A lost fragment from Act III had been found in 1983, and a more complete production was given by the Handel Opera Society under Charles Farncombe at Sadler's Wells Theatre in London in 1985. Among other performances, Rodrigo was staged in Karlsruhe in 1987, by the Handel Festival, Halle in 2002 and by the International Festival of Baroque and Romantic Opera, Beaune, France, in 2018.

== Roles ==
Roles, voice types, and premiere cast
Role	Voice type	Premiere cast, 1707
Rodrigo, the King	soprano castrato	Stefano Frilli
Esilena, wife to Rodrigo	soprano	Anna Maria Torri, La Beccarina
Florinda, mother to Rodrigo's child	soprano	Aurelia Marcello
Giuliano, brother to Florinda	tenor	Francesco Guicciardi
Evanco, last surviving son of Vitizza, the previous King	soprano (en travesti)	Caterina Azzolini, La Valentina
Fernando, minister to Rodrigo	contralto castrato	Giuseppe Perini

== Synopsis ==
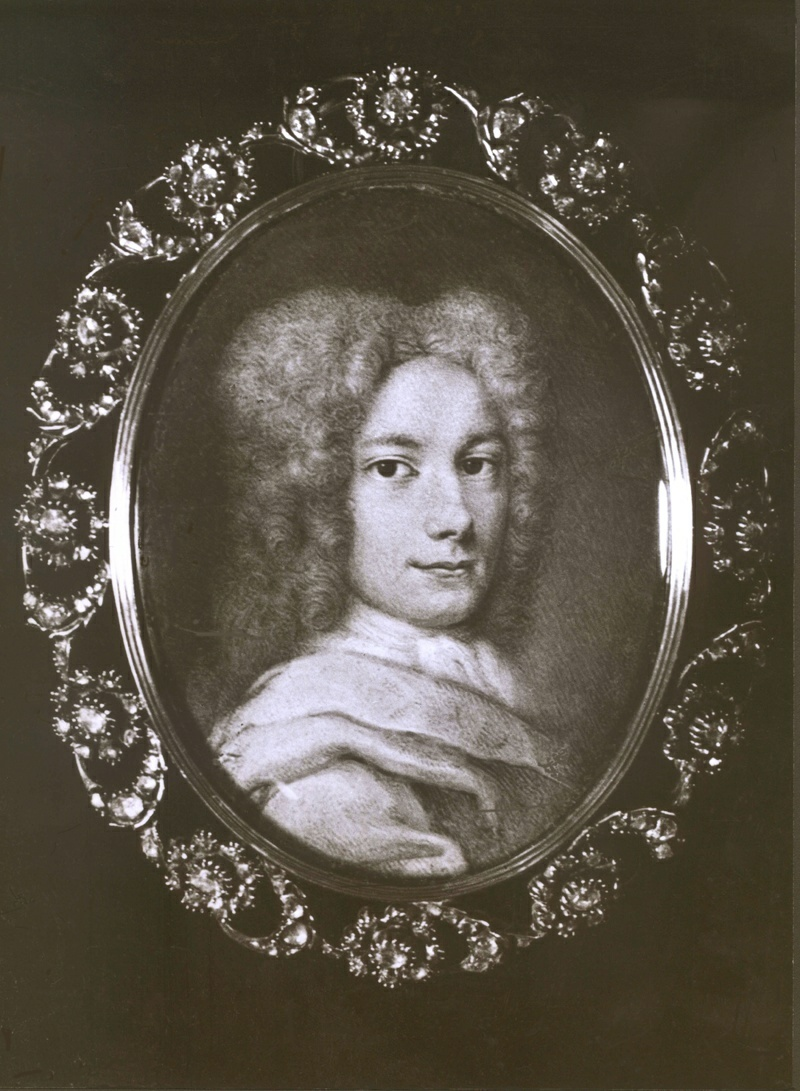
Handel as a young man

=== Prologue ===
Prior to the start of the opera, Rodrigo had deposed the previous king, Vitizza, who was corrupt, but then Rodrigo indulged in the same vices after he had become king. One example was his seduction of Florinda, who bore his son as a result. Rodrigo had intended to leave his wife Esilena, who was reportedly infertile, and marry Florinda. However, Rodrigo has not kept this promise.

=== Act 1 ===
The start of the opera brings news that Giuliano has defeated the sons of Vitizza in battle. In spite of her husband's betrayal, Esilena stays loyal to Rodrigo. Rodrigo demands that Evanco, the last surviving son of Vitizza, be executed. However, Esilena asks that Evanco be spared, and he is turned over to the custody of Giuliano. Giuliano learns of Rodrigo's broken promise to Florinda, and abandons his former support of Rodrigo to make an alliance with Evanco. Evanco is himself in love with Florinda. Rodrigo tells Esilena of his infidelity with Florinda. Esilena is prepared to renounce the throne to Florinda if it will bring peace.

=== Act 2 ===
At the military camp, Giuliano promises Evanco the throne if he will marry Florinda. Fernando has secretly offered his help to Giuliano against Rodrigo. Giuliano accepts the offer, in spite of warnings. Esilena offers to surrender her throne and husband to Florinda in exchange for peace. Florinda refuses, determined to have vengeance for Rodrigo's betrayal.

Fernando has captured Giuliano and taken him to Rodrigo. Rodrigo wants Giuliano executed, but Fernando and Esilena halt that intention for fear of stoking the rebellion. Rodrigo conveys through Fernando the message to Evanco that the only way he will be pardoned is to surrender himself. The only way that Florinda can save her brother is to leave the kingdom.

The army of Evanco then attacks and breaches the city. As they enter, they see Giuliano surrounded by Rodrigo's soldiers with Fernando about to kill him. Fernando presents Rodrigo's message, but it is refused. Evanco then kills Fernando and saves Giuliano.

=== Act 3 ===
The forces of Rodrigo battle those of Giuliano and Evanco, and Rodrigo is defeated and captured. As Giuliano and Evanco are about to execute Rodrigo, Florinda demands that task for herself. Before she can kill Rodrigo, Esilena enters with Florinda's son, and says that if Florinda wants to kill the father, she should kill the son as well. This stops Florinda, who then offers to spare Rodrigo. Giuliano and Evanco want none of that, but Esilena persuades them to be charitable as well. Rodrigo has become humbled at this turn of events, and tells Esilena that he may punish him for his infidelity. She does not do so. Rodrigo is allowed to abdicate the throne, and to go into voluntary exile with Esilena. Evanco ascends the throne, and he marries Florinda. They intend to raise Florinda's son by Rodrigo as the heir to the throne. Giuliano becomes regent.

== Context and analysis ==
The German-born Handel had worked at the opera house in Hamburg from the age of eighteen, playing the violin and harpsichord and composing several operas, the music of which is lost except for one, Almira, which was a success. From 1706 to 1709 Handel lived and worked in Italy, where he composed several Italian operas, Rodrigo being the first. The combination of Handel's Germanic roots with the Italianate style of music which he absorbed in his early career in Florence, Venice and Rome, created Handel's unique style.

According to John Mainwaring, Handel's first biographer, Rodrigo was very popular and he "was presented with 100 sequins, and a service of plate. This may serve for a sufficient testimony of its favourable reception."

The opera is scored for two recorders, two oboes, strings, and continuo (cello, lute, harpsichord).

== Recordings ==
Rodrigo discography
Year	Cast: Rodrigo, Esilena, Florinda, Giuliano, Evanco, Fernando	Conductor, orchestra	Label
1997	Gloria Banditelli, Sandrine Piau, Elena Cecchi Fedi, Rufus Müller, Roberta Invernizzi, Caterina Calvi	Alan Curtis; Il Complesso Barocco	CD:Virgin Classics; Cat:7243 5 45897 2 0
2008	Maria Riccarda Wesseling, María Bayo, Deborah York, Sharon Rostorf-Zamir, Anne-Catherine Gillet, Max Emanuel Cenčić	Eduardo López Banzo; Al Ayre Español	CD:Ambroisie AM; Cat:132
2019	Erica Eloff, Fflur Wyn, Anna Dennis, Jorge Navarro Colorado, Russell Harcourt, Leandro Marziotte	Laurence Cummings, Göttingen International Handel Festival Orchestra	CD:Accent Records; Cat:ACC26412
