= José de Nebra =

Spanish composer and organist (1702–1768)

José Melchor Baltasar Gaspar Nebra Blasco (January 6, 1702 – July 11, 1768) was a Spanish composer and organist from the Baroque period. His work combines Spanish traditions with the Italian style of his day.

== Biography ==
=== Family ===
José de Nebra was born in Calatayud and was taught by his father, José Antonio Nebra Mezquita (1672–1748), organist and master of choirboys at the Cathedral of Cuenca from 1711 until 1729 before becoming chapel master. His two brothers were also musicians: Francisco Javier Nebra Blasco (1705–1741), organist of La Seo in Zaragoza until he moved to Cuenca in 1729, then succeeded by his brother Joaquín Ignacio Nebra Blasco (1709–1782) till his death.

=== Career ===
José de Nebra relocated to Madrid early in his career, where he served as the organist at the Descalzas Reales convent in 1719. In 1722, he joined the chapel of the Osuna noble household. There, he started composing music for commercial theatres in Madrid alongside Antonio Literes and Antonio Duni. Nebra then became an organist at the Descalzas Reales convent and at the royal chapel on May 22, 1724. That August, Nebra was appointed supernumerary organist with the promise of a promotion to first organist if an opening occurred at the royal chapel. Alongside Literes, Nebra rebuilt the collection of church music after a fire at the royal chapel in 1734. He advocated for a collection of works by Neapolitan composers such as Alessando Scarlatti and shifted his focus to sacred music composition. Nebra contributed 7 Salve Regina settings, 19 Masses, and 14 orchestral lamentations. Nebra declined offers for posts as chapel master and organist at both Santiago Cathedral in 1738, and Cuenca Cathedral in 1741. On June 5, 1751, he was named vicemaestro and assistant director of the royal choir school at the royal chapel in Madrid.

Nebra was a talented organist and respected teacher. He oversaw organ restorations at both the Jeronimos convent (1749) and the chapel of the new royal palace (1756). Nebra taught the organ to both Antonio Soler and José Lidón, who each became prominent musicians. In 1761, he became the harpsichord teacher to Prince Gabriel and later taught his nephew, Manuel Blasco de Nebra. José was locked up for many years in house arrest because he appeared in the letters seized from the Marquis Jaime José Ignacio Velaz de Medrano y Barros who conspired to place Ferdinand VI on the throne instead of his father Philip V. He died in Madrid.

== Music and influence ==
More than 170 works by Nebra survive: masses, psalms, litanies, a Stabat Mater, a Salve Regina, cantatas, villancicos, and around thirty keyboard works. However, his significance is as the leading late-Baroque composer of Spanish opera and zarzuela.

=== Theatre ===
In 1728, Nebra composed music for Amor aumenta el valor alongside Facco and Falconi for the royal wedding of the Prince of Asturias to Princess Maria Barbara. However, most of Nebra's influence as a theatre composer comes from his work in Madrid's public theatres. There, he worked with top playwrights and opened new indoor theatres. He launched the first Spanish season at the Coliseo de la Cruz in 1737, and instituted the Coliseo de Príncipe in 1745. He composed almost 60 stage works, including secular and sacred librettos, each including spoken dialogue. Nebra composed across various genres, including theatrical zarzuelas, comedias, and autos sacramentales. He also composed shorter stage pieces, such as loas, sainetes, and entremeses. Nebra's music blended Spanish forms like seguidillas and coplas with Italian-style da capo arias. His orchestrations typically featured strings, woodwinds, and brass.

Although successful in public theatres, Nebra had limited involvement in court plays after 1728. Italian composers began dominating opera, leaving Nebra's only known contributions to be playing harpsichord in operas such as Farnace (1739) and Achille in Sciro (1744). His only known instrumental contributions include arranging music for two revived plays performed at a royal wedding in 1764.

=== Sacred ===
Nebra contributed 7 Salve Regina settings, 19 Masses, and 14 orchestral lamentations after the 1734 royal chapel fire. Nebra's sacred music increased after becoming assistant maestro of the royal chapel in 1751. His works included an eight-part choir and diverse instrumentation, suited for the chapels resources. He also wrote for other churches such as Cuenca Cathedral, Santiago de Compostela, and the Seo church in Zaragoza. His sacred compositions continued, creating a requiem for Queen Barbara and sending works to chapels for performances. His sacred compositions declined after 1761.

=== Harpsichord and organ ===
Nebra's harpsichord and organ works only survive in copies that were made after his death. These works resemble those of Scarlatti and José Elías, developing bipartite sonata form.

== Works ==
=== Sacred works ===
- Aromática rosa Americana
- Miserere
- Para un triunfo que el orbe
- Requiem for Queen Barbara of Braganza
- Rompan los vagos espacios
- Salve regina
- Cantata: Entre candidos bellos

=== Spanish vocal ===
- Al que en solio de rayos
- Aliento fervorosa
- Bello pastor
- Con júbilo en el orbe
- Dulzura espiritual
- El celeste combate

=== Keyboard ===
- Batalla de clarines
- Paso en versos para la salmodia

=== Operas ===
- Amor aumenta el valor (collective work, 1st act only), Lisbon 1728
- Venus y Adonis, 1729
- Más gloria es triunfar de sí. Adriano in Syria, 1737
- No todo indicio es verdad. Alexander in Asia, 1744
- Antes que zelos y amor, la piedad llama al valor. Achilles in Troy 1747

=== Zarzuelas ===
- Las proezas de Esplandián y el valor deshace encantos, 1729
- Amor, ventura y valor logran el triunfo mayor, 1739
- Viento es la dicha de amor, 1743
- Donde hay violencia, no hay culpa, 1744
- Vendado es Amor, no es ciego, 1744
- Cautelas contra cautelas y el rapto de Ganimedes, 1745
- La colonia de Diana, 1745
- Para obsequio a la deydad, nunca es culto la crueldad. Iphigenia en Tracia (Thrace), 1747
- No hay perjurio sin castigo, 1747

== Notable performances ==
The composer's 250th anniversary in 2018 saw the programming of some of his works, for example at Musica Antigua Aranjuez, the early music festival at Aranjuez. A performance of the opera Venus y Adonis has been scheduled for 2019 by the Centro Nacional de Difusión Musical.

== Selected recordings ==
- 1996 - Viento es la dicha de amor (zarzuela). Ensemble Baroque de Limoges, dir. Christophe Coin. Naïve
- 2001 – Miserere. Al Ayre Español. Deutsche Harmonia Mundi
- 2001 - Principio de Maitines de Navidad. Madrid Barroco, dir. Grover Wilkins
- 2001 - Responsorium I. Madrid Barroco, dir. Grover Wilkins
- 2001 - Hymnus Sanctissimae Trinitari. Madrid Borroco, dir. Grover Wiklins
- Sonata, op. 1 no. 4 for harpsichord, performed by Janine Johnson
- 2005 – La Cantada Española en América. Al Ayre Español. Harmonia Mundi
- 2006 - Vispera de Confesores. La Grande Chapelle, dir. Àngel Recasens. Lauda Musica
- 2006 - Arias de Zarzuelas. María Bayo, Al Ayre Español, dir. Eduardo López Banzo. Harmonia Mundi
- 2010 – Amor aumenta el valor (opera). Los Músicos de Su Alteza. Alpha
- 2011 - Cantatas. Esta Dulzura Amable. Al Ayre Español, dir. Eduardo López Banzo. Challenge Classics
- 2011 - Principio des Maitines de Navidad; Responsorium I, Nocturno 1, Nativitatis Domini. "Madrid 1752, Madrid Barroco, dir. Grover Wilkins. Dorian
- 2011 - Iphigenia en Tracia (zarzuela). El concierto español, dir. Emilio Moreno. Glossa
- 2019 - Requiem. La Madrileña - Coro Victoria - Schola Antiqua, dir. José Antonio Montaño. Pan Classics
- 2020 - Vendado es Amor, no es ciego (zarzuela). Los Elementos, dir.Alberto Miguélez Rouco. Glossa
- 2021 - Cantadas Francisco Corselli & José de Nebra. Los Elementos, dir.Alberto Miguélez Rouco. PanClassics
- 2022 - Donde hay violencia, no hay culpa (zarzuela). Los Elementos, dir.Alberto Miguélez Rouco. Glossa
- 2025 - Venus y Adonis (opera). Los Elementos, dir.Alberto Miguélez Rouco. Aparté
- 2025 - Sinfonia en sol menor y Versos de vísperas. Los Elementos, dir. Alberto Miguélez Rouco. Château de Versailles Spectacles
