= José de Torres =

Spanish composer, organist, music theorist and music publisher

José de Torres y Martínez Bravo (1670 – 1738) was a Spanish composer, organist, music theorist and music publisher.

== Biography ==
Torres was born in Madrid, where he served as organist of the capilla real from 1697. With the arrival of the Bourbons, Torres was expelled from the capilla, but avoided exile and was rehabilitated. From 1702 he established a music printing press, Imprenta de Música, the first in Iberia. With the continuing exile of Sebastián Durón, Torres served the former Duke of Anjou, now Philip V of Spain, as maestro de capilla and rector of the boys choir (Colegio de Niños Cantorcicos), replacing the interim maestros Matías Cabrera and Nicolás Humanes, in 1707. He held this post until his death. He died in Madrid.

He was the author of various musical works. These include “Reglas generales para acompañar órgano, clavicordio o arpa” (Madrid, 1702) [a work covering accompaniment techniques for organ, clavichord and harp] and a book of masses dedicated to Philip V of Spain.

His work "Arte de canto llano" was published in 1705 and subsequently augmented was a “corrected and augmented” edition of the work by the same name of Francisco de Montanos. It contains a number of compositions by Torres, including his 4-part Salve Regina, printed in score, a solo cantata Flavescite, serenate and a solo aria. It also contains settings of the Benedictus by Alonso Lobo and Philippe Rogier.

A large number of compositions by Torres are preserved in the archive of Guatemala Cathedral, although some of these are in poor condition with some missing parts. These manuscripts have been microfilmed or scanned. Digitised versions of the microfilm are online. They include manuscript and printed works, the latter possibly from Torres' printing press. These compositions include a large number of villancicos in three, four, seven and eight parts, solo cantatas for treble, soprano and “contralto”, an 8-part “Missa annuntiate nobis” with violin, oboe and basso continuo accompaniment and a 4-part a cappella mass "ad omnem tonum" concluding in an eight-part Agnus Dei based on Magnificat tones.

The cantatas are in the Italian style. The lyrics are often very obscure. The cantatas for “contralto” are particularly elaborate with long melismatic sections. It is not clear whether they were intended for male or female singers. The solo soprano cantata Afectos amantes contains an aria "La solfa mia" based on the natural hexachord which may be a personal statement by Torres of his approach to composition.

A number of works by Torres have been recorded on CD by the Spanish group Al Ayre Español. Some of the scores from Arte de canto llano and from the Guatemala archive have been transcribed and are accessible in the Choral Public Domain Library.

== Works ==
- Music theory : Reglas generales para acompañar órgano, clavicordio o arpa (1702) - The first work in Spain to deal specifically and completely with thorough bass accompaniment at the keyboard.
- Editor: Francisco de Montanos - Arte de canto llano: con entonaciones de coro, y altar, y otras cosas (edited by Torres), Imprenta de Música (Madrid) 1705 (augmented in later editions).
- El Libro Que Contiene Onze Obras para Órgano de Registros Partidos del Dr. Dn. Joseph de Torres. Transcripción y estudio Felipe Ramírez, México: Conaculta, INBA, Cenidim, 1993, 112 p.

== Discography ==
- Mas No puede ser. Al clamor. - on Barroco Español Vol 1 - Mas No puede ser Al Ayre Español Banzo, DHM 1994
- Miserere. Lamentación segunda. - on Barroco Español Vol 3 - Quando Muere El Sol Al Ayre Español Almajano (Soprano), Banzo, DHM 1997
- Vuela abejuela (cantata) - on La Cantada Española En America Mena, Al Ayre Español Banzo, Harmonia Mundi. 2004
