= José de Cañizares =

Spanish playwright (1676–1750)

José de Cañizares y Suárez (4 July 1676 – 4 September 1750) was a Spanish playwright. Cavalry officer, public official, and author of around one hundred works, he was one of the most important dramatists of the early 18th century.

== Life ==
Born in Madrid on 4 July 1676, and baptized ten days later in the church of San Martín, Cañizares had his roots in the countryside south of the capital. His parents were by birth manchegos, from Almagro, Ciudad Real, in the region known as La Mancha. Don José was named after his father. His mother was Doña Jerónima Suárez de Toledo y la Caballería. Both parents belonged to the minor nobility or hidalgo class, which their son later portrayed with humor in many of his plays.

Sometime in his late teens or early twenties, Cañizares entered military service. In the War of the Spanish Succession (1701–1714) he served with a unit of heavily armored cavalry, fighting on the side of Felipe V. By 1711, he had attained the rank of Lieutenant Captain, and also, due to his family background, the patronage of the Duke of Osuna, and his own growing fame as author of comedias in the Golden Age tradition, enjoyed a place at Felipe's court.

In 1702 Cañizares found himself appointed by the Magistrate of Madrid as fiscal de comedias, a member of the Board of Theatrical Censors, an office which he exercised in the intervals between combat when the king and his armies returned to the capital. This five-member committee included the Magistrate and his appointee (Cañizares), plus the Vicar of Madrid and his two appointees.

Every play proposed for public performance in Madrid had to be submitted to this committee. Each of the officials in turn must approve the play or it would be banned from the stage. As the years went by, Cañizares submitted many of his own plays for approval. As he gained experience in his craft, the board occasionally called upon him to revise a classic Golden Age play so that it would comply with the moral and political views of early 18th century Spain.

His signed approbations are to be found on manuscripts dating as early as 1702. Receipts for his annual salary as fiscal are found dating as early as 1708. He supplemented his military and civil service incomes by composing 2-4 major plays per year up through 1734.

Of Cañizares' family life, we know only what the public records, as cited chiefly by Cristóbal Pérez Pastor, reveal. Sometime prior to 1733, Cañizares retired from the military and contracted marriage with Doña Lorenza, daughter of Don Gregorio Alvarez de Losada and Doña Phelipa Osorio de Redín, both residents of Madrid. Doña Lorenza was the widow of Don Andrés González Valdés y Salgado, with whom she had had a son, Pedro. On 16 November 1733, she gave birth to Cañizares' son and heir, named José after his father and grandfather. She also bore him a daughter, Jerónima, presumably named after Cañizares' mother. Pérez Pastor notes the daughter's birth as after 1734. The family residence was located in the Calle de las Veneras, opposite the Plazuela de Santo Domingo.

The year 1747 marked a change in Cañizares' life. Now in his seventies, he took a position in the counting house of the Duke of Osuna. On 25 November, he and his wife made a will, giving her custody of the children in the event of his death. He received his salary as fiscal for the last time on 10 September 1750. The balance for the remaining six months was collected by his widow.

Don José de Cañizares died on 4 September 1750 at his Madrid residence, and was buried in the Dominican monastery of El Rosario. His works lived on, continuing to be performed in Madrid and the provinces through the remainder of the 18th century and on into the first few years of the 19th, with occasional revivals up to the present day.

== Works ==
José de Cañizares was the most prolific dramatist of early 18th century Spain, credited with writing 80-100 comedias and zarzuelas, plus numerous minor works such as loas, entremeses, mojigangas, bailes, and fines de fiesta, the little pieces that rounded out a theatrical evening. Many of his plays enjoyed immense popularity in his lifetime and formed an integral part of the repertoire of the Madrid companies for over 60 years after his death.

He is said to have written his earliest play in 1696 at the age of 13: Las cuentas del Gran Capitán, a reworking of a play by Lope de Vega. When finally produced in his adult years, Cañizares' version enjoyed such success that it eventually replaced Lope's play in the 18th century theatrical repertoire.

The earliest of Cañizares' plays to be performed were zarzuelas on classical, mythological, and chivalresque themes presented in the royal theater of the Buen Retiro. This type of play, produced in collaboration with well-known composers of the period (Antonio de Líteres, José Nebra, Jaime Facco, Francisco Coradini), incorporated many features (da capo arias, duets, dance sequences) of the Italian opera so loved by Felipe V and both his Italian-born queens. Spoken scenes and passages alternated with those that were sung. What made the zarzuela uniquely Spanish was the retention of many elements of the Calderonian comedia, including the three-act format and typical characters such as the rustic nobleman (figurón) and comical servant (gracioso).

We have first performance dates for the following zarzuelas: Acis y Galatea (1708—repeated at the royal court of Lisbon in 1711), Las Amazonas de España (1720), Amor es todo invención: Jupiter y Anfitrión (Love is a Fiction—1721), Angélica y Medoro (1722), and La hazaña mayor de Alcides (The Greatest Deed of Alcides—1723). After this period, Cañizares began writing for the great public theaters of Madrid, the Teatro del Príncipe and the Teatro de la Cruz.

Cañizares wrote nearly every conceivable type of comedia. Among his most popular capa y espada (cloak and sword) plays written in the tradition of Calderón are Castigar Favoreciendo (To Punish by Favoring), Dios los cría y ellos se juntan (Birds of a Feather Flock Together), Yo me entiendo y Dios me entiende (I Know What I Mean and God Knows What I Mean).

Some of his most popular historical plays, which focus on a military hero who saves the day for his or her country, are Carlos V sobre Túnez (Charles V at Tunis), El guapo Julián Romero (The Daring Julian Romero), La heroica Antona García (The Heroic Antona Garcia).

Some examples of his picaresque comedias are El picarillo en España y Señor de la Gran Canaria (The Little Rogue in Spain, and Lord of Grand Canary), and El falso nuncio de Portugal (The False Papal Agent of Portugal).

Religious plays (comedias de santos) include, among others, La más amada de Cristo, Santa Gertrudis la Magna (The Most Beloved of Christ, St. Gertrude the Great—Parts I and II), Lo que vale ser devoto de San Antonio de Padua (The Value of Devotion to St. Anthony of Padua), A cuál mejor, confesada y confesor (Which Is Greater, Confessed or Confessor?--St. Teresa of Avila and St. John of the Cross). La viva imagen de Cristo: El Santo Niño de la Villa de la Guardia (The Living Image of Christ: The Holy Child of Villa de la Guardia) is based on the legend of the Holy Child of La Guardia.

The two genres at which Cañizares excelled, the comedia de figurón (rural nobleman at court) and the comedia de magia (magic), both enjoyed a long life in the "little theaters" of Madrid. One or another of the most popular seldom failed to be presented at Christmas, Easter, and other seasons of joy.

Among his figurón plays are El Dómine Lucas, La más ilustre fregona (The Most Illustrious Kitchenmaid) and El honor da entendimiento (Honor Gives Understanding). The zarzuela De los hechizos de amor la música es el mayor (The Greatest Enchantment of Love is Music) incorporates a figurón who competes with the hero for the hand of his lady.

The public had a special fondness for Cañizares' comedias de magia, a genre full of special effects and sudden plot twists. Among these are El asombro de Francia, Marta la Romarantina (The Wonder of France, Marta la Romarantina—Parts I and II), Don Juan de Espina en Milán, Don Juan de Espina en Madrid, and El anillo de Giges y mágico rey de Lidia (The Ring of Giges and Magician-King of Lydia—Parts I, II and III).

Also extant are a few of Cañizares' non-dramatic works, most notably a collection of lyrics for villancicos de Navidad (Christmas carols) commissioned by the Royal Chapel of Madrid, and two examples of Gongorine-style funereal prose in honor of the Dauphin of France, father of Felipe V.

The total number of Cañizares' plays that continued to be staples of the major theaters of Madrid comes to 24. Of these, 20 had at least one performance after 1800. The operatic theater Caños del Peral presented a few of his plays along with a series of Golden Age works in the early 19th century. The last 19th century data available show a performance of the all-time favorite figurón play Dómine Lucas in the Teatro de la Cruz in 1840. In the late 20th and early 21st centuries, some of his zarzuelas have been successfully revived on the Madrid stage.

== Selected works ==
- Acis y Galatea 1708
- El estrago en la fineza, Júpiter y Semele - a Spanish-language zarzuela opera by Antonio de Literes to a libretto by José de Cañizares, premiered 9 May 1718 at the Teatro de la Cruz, Madrid.
