= Antonio de Herrera y Tordesillas =

Spanish historian (1549–1626 or 1625)

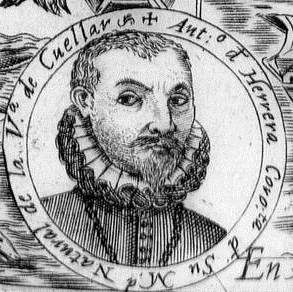
- Antonio de Herrera y Tordesillas
- Born: 1549; Cuéllar, Segovia, Spain
- Died: 28 March 1626 or 27 March 1625; Madrid
- Resting place: Cuéllar Town Hall, Cuéllar, Segovia, Spain
- Occupations: chronicler, historian
- Spouses: Juana de Esparza y Artieda (1581–1584); María de Torres Hinestrosa (1594–1626)
- Children: Juana
- Writing career
- Language: Spanish
- Period: 1582–1622
- Subjects: history, geography

Antonio de Herrera y Tordesillas (1549 – 28 March 1626 or 27 March 1625) was a chronicler, historian, and writer of the Spanish Golden Age, author of Historia general de los hechos de los castellanos en las Islas y Tierra Firme del mar Océano que llaman Indias Occidentales ("General History of the Deeds of the Castilians on the Islands and Mainland of the Ocean Sea Known As the West Indies"), better known in Spanish as Décadas and considered one of the best works written on the conquest of the Americas.

He was Chief Chronicler of Castile and the Americas during the reigns of Philip II and Philip III. Cristóbal Pérez Pastor called him the "prince of the historians of the Americas". He is considered the most prolific historian of his era, and his works also include a general history of the world, a history of Portugal, and a description of the Americas. His output also features translations of works from Italian and Latin into Spanish, and a translation of his own Descripción de las Indias Occidentales ("Description of the West Indies") into Dutch. Some later historians have criticized Herrera's works for perceived shortcomings in reliability and impartiality, including claims that he relied on unpublished works by others.

== Biography ==
He was born in Cuéllar, Province of Segovia, into a well-to-do noble family, the son of Rodrigo de Tordesillas (the son of another Rodrigo de Tordesillas who died at the hands of the comuneros) and Inés de Herrera. He himself placed his mother's surname before his father's in opposition to modern Spanish naming customs.

He undertook his earliest studies in the Latin grammar school of his hometown, developing a notable facility for getting to know people and an inexhaustible capacity for work, which would later be confirmed. His education (especially in Latin), perhaps pursued at the University of Salamanca, reached its pinnacle in Italy. In 1570 he traveled to Italy in the service of Prince Vespasiano I Gonzaga, one of the most distinguished personages of his era in Italy. His knowledge of Latin increased as he learned Italian.

In 1572 Gonzaga was named Viceroy of Navarre. Herrera accompanied him and established a residence in Pamplona. He continued to enjoy the viceroy's confidence when he took up the analogous post in Valencia in 1575, although Herrera moved his residence to Court as Gonzaga's most trusted aide, resolving issues on his behalf before the King and the Court. Meanwhile, Herrera expanded his circle of friends and established contact with influential people as, little by little, he amassed a small fortune.

In the last years of Gonzaga's life, he introduced Herrera to King Philip II as one learned in historical matters. It was the starting point of a relationship which Herrera was able to maintain, beginning by doing the self-interested courtesy of dedicating his historical works (which he had already started) to important people. To get his acquaintance with the King started on the right foot, he translated from the Italian Giovanni Tommaso Minadoi's Historia della guerra fra turchi et persiani.

While living in Pamplona he met the woman who would become his first wife, Juana de Esparza y Artieda. They married in 1581 and the union afforded him a social standing of a certain distinction, despite his not yet having secured significant capital or equity, although he was on his way to achieving it. Their only child, Juana, died in 1587 at a young age, three years after her mother.

After a decade of widowerhood, he married secondly a woman from Cuéllar, María de Torres Hinestrosa, a descendant on one side of the Lords of Henestrosa, and on the other, via an illegitimate child, of King Alfonso IX of León. They had no children.

=== Chronicler ===
During the years after the death of his first wife, Herrera dedicated himself to strengthening his position at Court, investing in real estate in Madrid, and of course, writing constantly, until he secured the post of Chief Chronicler of the Americas in 1596, and of Castile in 1598, with an attractive salary. In 1601 he moved to Valladolid with the Court, and there pursued his tireless historiographical activity, along with that related to Court and the inevitable tasks of a financial nature.

In 1607 he returned to Madrid, living in a house on the Puerta del Sol and devoted to his literary tasks, where he enjoyed a comfortable and stately lifestyle. However, the economic intrigues in which he was involved led to his being placed under house arrest from 1609 to 1611. He continued his historiographical and literary activity until his death.

=== Death ===
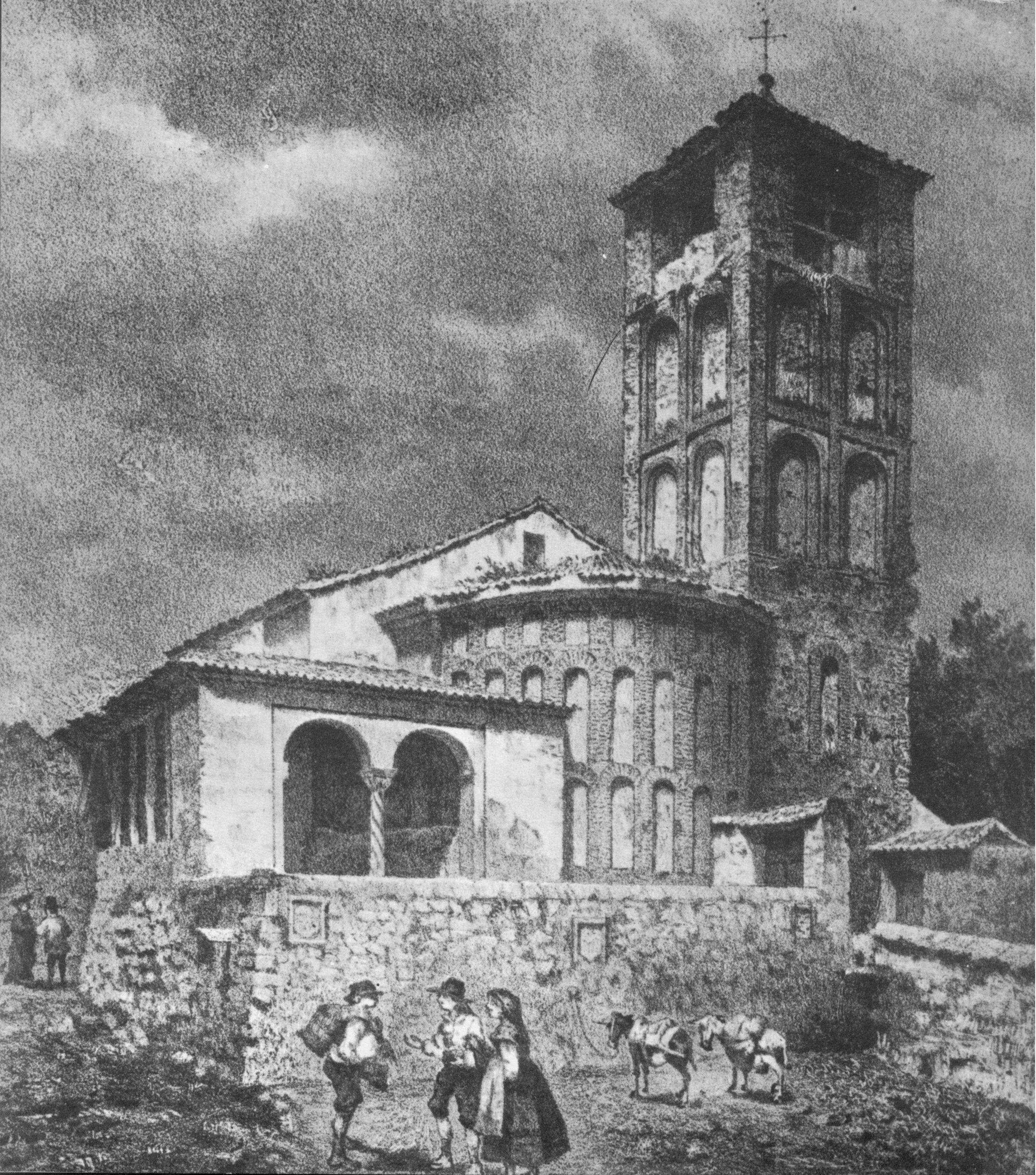
Church of Santa Marina, of which only the tower remains. Drawing by Francisco Javier Parcerisa in 1865.

Herrera died in Madrid on 28 March 1626 or 27 March 1625. He ordered in his will that his body be buried "in the parish church of Santa Marina in the town of Cuéllar, at the altar there with the arch in the main chapel on the epistle side, to which end it will be prepared by order and will of my heir, placing upon it a sign in Castilian roman letters which will be found among my papers and, conforming to what is found written in Latin, will be placed on my grave", and his terms were fulfilled. Herrera set out a maximum time frame of two years for burial Cuéllar, taking into account possible obstacles in doing so immediately, and proposed as a provisional burial place the Monastery of San Hermenegildo, in the chapel of Captain Juan Bautista Anotonelli, whose patron he was, and this provision was carried out.

In the 19th century, during the ecclesiastical confiscations, the church was sold and the new owner used the tombstone as a stair, so that the gilding of the inscription was lost, while the mortal remains were moved in 1886 to the nearby Church of San Pedro, and when this was secularized in 1890, they were moved to one of the rooms of the Cuéllar Town Hall, where they remain today with those of his wife and the tombstone, which at the urgings of the Real Academia de la Historia was donated in 1952 by the owner of the church. The tombstone bears the following inscription:

Ant, Herrera Tordesillas. Chronicu
Philip, 2 & 3 Castellæ & Indiar. Gene
ral. Inquis. Familiaris Nauarr, et Valenti,
a Secretis Regiæ Familiæ Domesticus,
vixit cum nobili vxo D. M. de Torres an[nis 38]
[a] laborib, felix, pmijs n suppar. Obijt M[atriti]
[anno] 1626, die, 28 Mr. illa 3[0] An 1641.

Antonio Herrera Tordesillas, chronicler
of the kings Philip II and III of Castile and the Americas,
Familiar of the General Inquisition, Secretary of those of Navarre and Valencia,
Servant of the Royal Household.
He lived 38 years with his noble wife Doña María de Torres,
happy in his labors, but not receiving the prizes he deserved.
He died in Madrid on 28 March 1626. She died on 30 March 1641.

== Works ==
=== Descripción de las Indias Occidentales ===
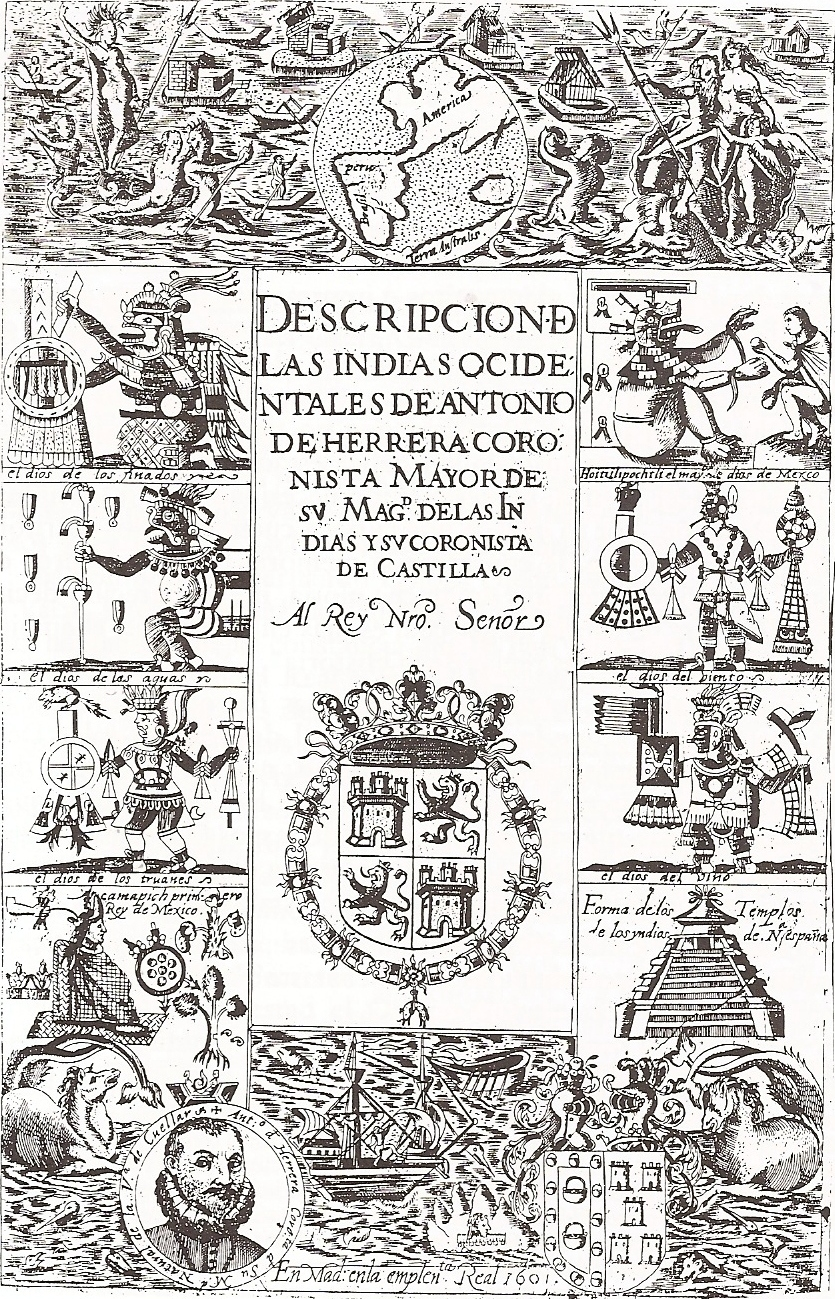
Title page of Descripción de las Indias, first edition, 1601, with iconographic engravings of indigenous people. It includes the only known portrait of the author.

Herrera's historiography of the Americas began with his Descripción de las Indias, published in 1601, in which he included various maps and foldout pages. In spite of its being considered an independent work, as that is how it was published, it serves as the introduction to his Décadas, establishing a pattern often imitated by twentieth century writers: he treats the geographical matters in the strictest sense of the word, such that it serves as a helpful tool for understanding the history he would publish subsequently, describing the locations of significant places and the lay of the land as the setting in which the history played out.

The tradition which began with Columbus's first voyage culminated with Herrera's Descripción. It is composed of several chronicles, nautical treatises, and other manuals, akin to the work of Martín Fernández de Enciso, Alonso de Chaves, Alonso de Santa Cruz, and Juan López de Velasco, as well as extensive cartography. Herrera drew upon all these sources to compose the text of his Descripción and its fourteen maps of the Americas and the Far East. It was common in later editions of his Décadas to include his Descripción as a supplement, although on occasion it was published separately. It was translated into English, by Captain John Stevens in 1725, as well as German, French, and Latin.

Herrera used four main sources for his Descripción: the geographical works of Juan López de Velasco (Chapters I, II, III, V, and XI-XXVII); Codex J-15 of the Biblioteca Nacional de España (I, III, V and VIII-X); the history written by Gonzalo Fernández de Oviedo (VII), and archival documents (II, IV, VI-VII, XI-XV, XVIII-XXVII y XXVIII-XXXII).

=== Décadas ===
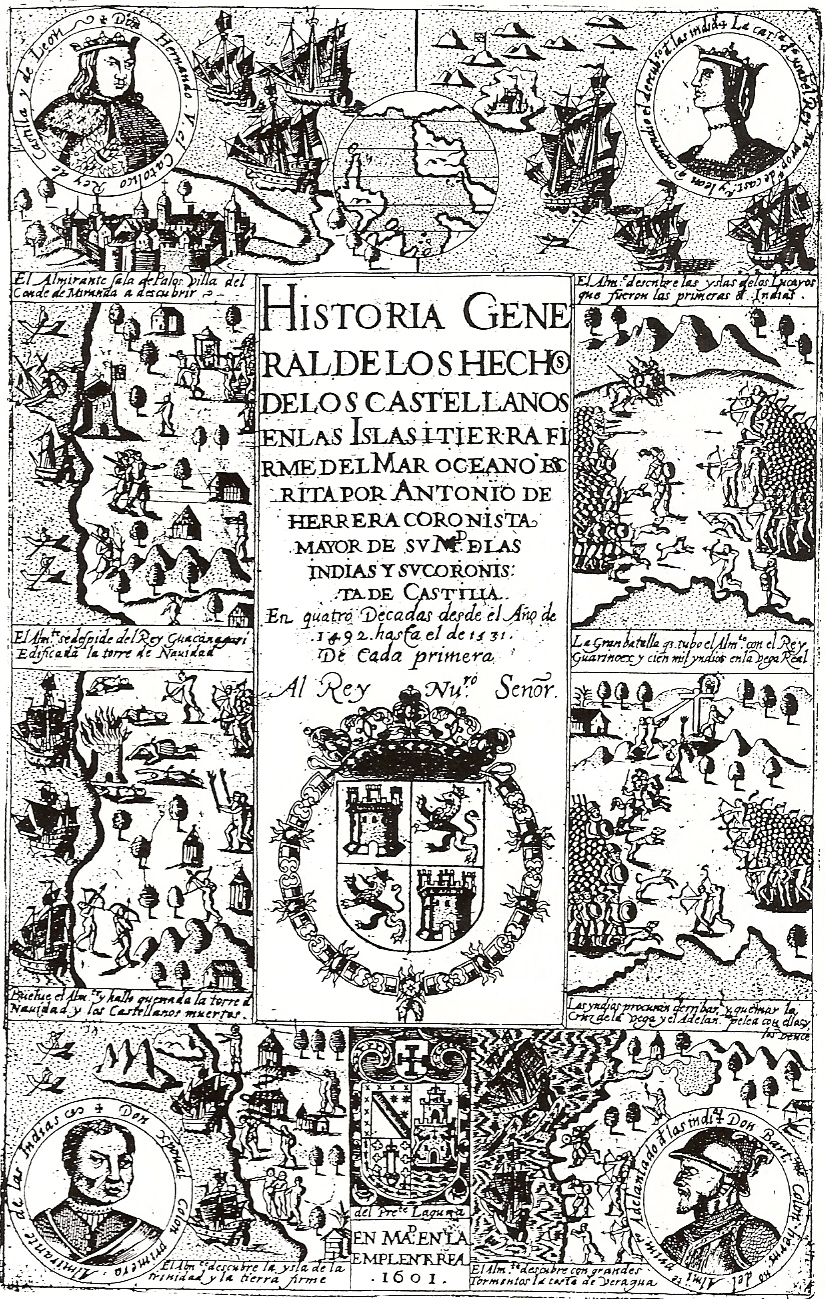
Title page of Décadas

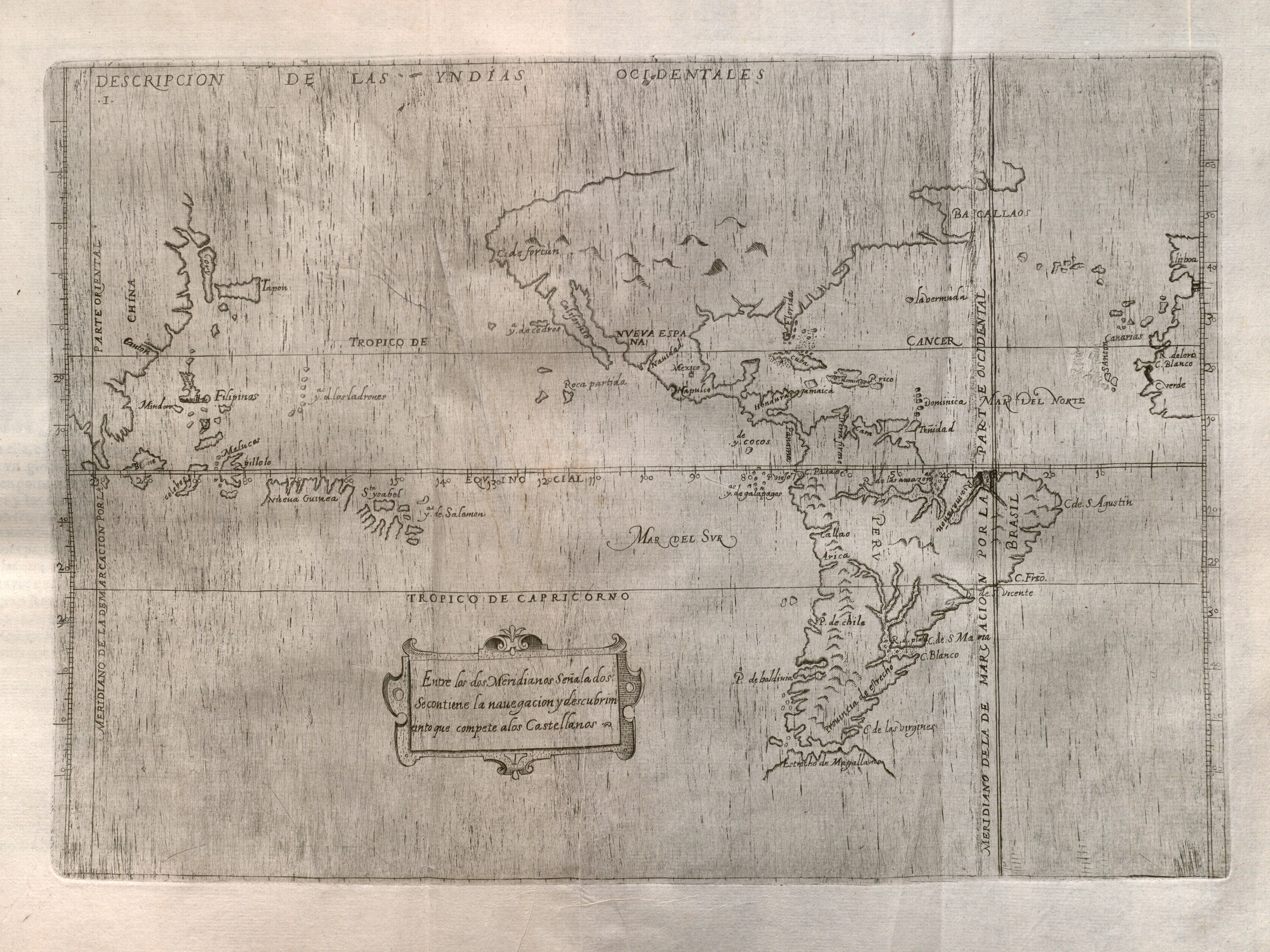
1601 map Descripcion de las Yndias Ocidentales from Historia General de los Hechos de los Castellanos en las Islas i Tierra Firme del Mar Oceano

Herrera is most widely recognized for his Historia general de los hechos de los castellanos en las Islas y Tierra Firme del mar Océano que llaman Indias Occidentales, known as Décadas, which was published by Juan Flamenco and Juan de la Cuesta between 1601 and 1615, in four volumes. It is the most complete written history of the Americas, and as its title indicates, the work focuses on telling the events experienced by the conquistadors, passing over the natural environment, which he had already covered in his Descripción, and the indigenous world, which he considered had been covered by Bartolomé de las Casas, Bernardino de Sahagún, Andrés de Olmos, and Gerónimo de Mendieta, hence it is a history of events rather than of things. Nor is it a history whose underlying objective was to understand and evaluate events, rather it is fundamentally descriptive, leaving personal judgments to the side, retelling the events in which the Castilians were the main actors.

The engraved title page engravings made allusion to temples, caciques, and other aspects of the Americas, as well as portraits of some of the Spanish conquistadors, including his fellow cuellaranos Diego Velázquez de Cuéllar, Juan de Grijalva, and Captain Gabriel de Rojas y Córdova. These portraits constitute an accurate collection of the most famous of the conquistadors, and many of them are unique, which makes them especially exceptional. The Décadas are considered a work not subject to influence, since the author did not live through the experiences he describes, attempting to acquaint the reader with them through the chronicles of his predecessors in his post and other learned men of letters, and through all the official documents which, due to his position, he had within reach, coming from books of the Cámara de Castilla and the papers from the archive of the Council of the Indies, so that it was the first history of the Americas which used all the available historical sources and so was the first general history of the Americas.

The work was so monumental that Antonio de Solís, who succeeded Herrera as chronicler, did not feel up to the task of continuing it. The only person who made an attempt, without much success, was another chronicler, Pedro Fernández del Pulgar, who, despite his good will and tenacity, yielded a disappointing result, such that his manuscript remains unpublished to this day.

Décadas was greatly successful at the time of publication, and within a few years it was translated into Latin, French, and German, and later into Dutch and English. It eventually went into twenty editions, the last in 1991 under the auspices of the Universidad Complutense de Madrid, supplanting an earlier one by the Real Academia de la Historia.

=== Historia general del mundo ===
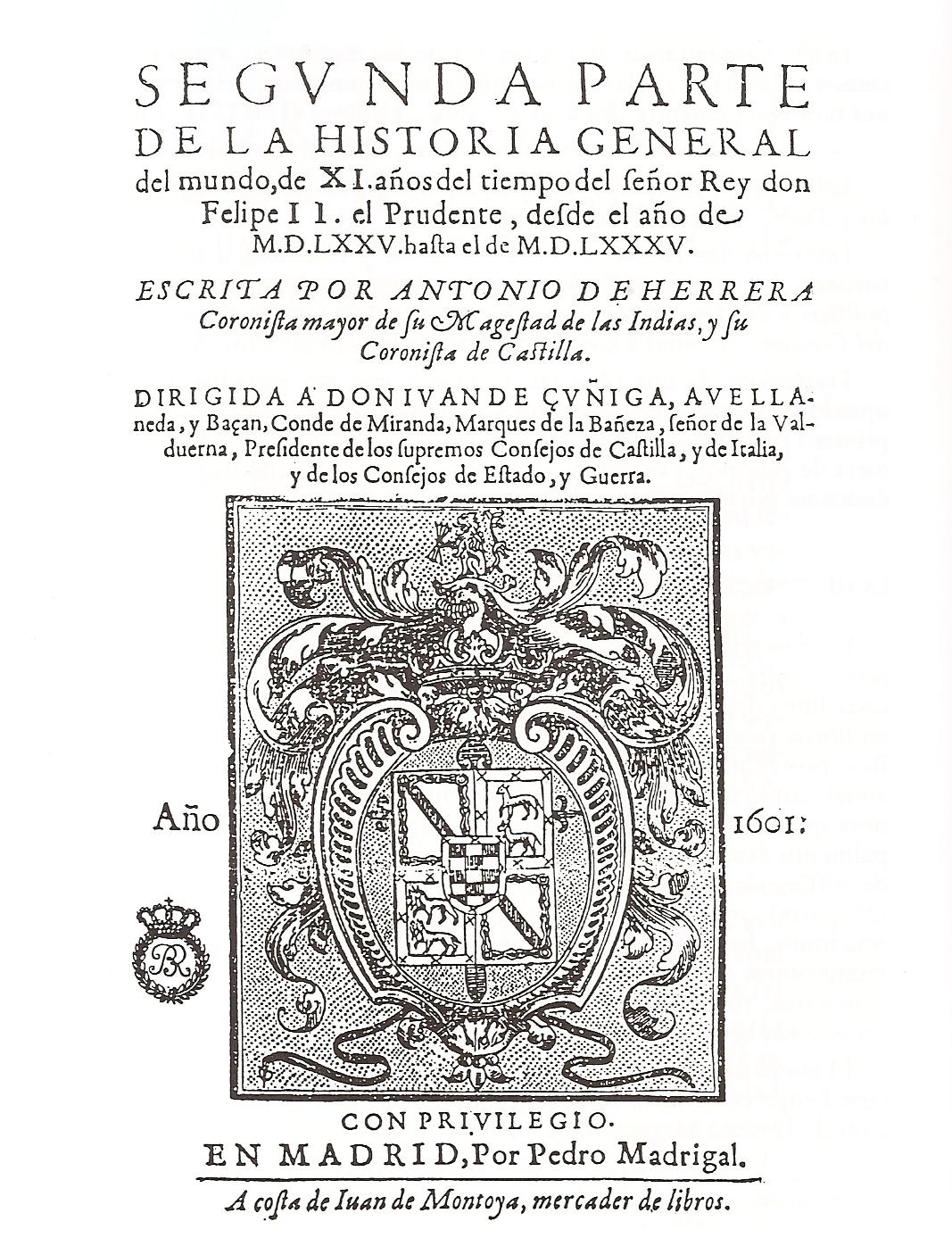
Title page of the second part of his Historia general del mundo.

He also published Historia general del Mundo, written in the time of Philip II and divided into three parts, each of which is divided into books, and each book into chapters. The first part covers the years from 1559 to 1574 (although it begins with the marriage of Philip II, before his accession, to Mary I of England in 1554) and was published in Madrid in 1601 and in Valladolid in 1606, after which an improved second edition appeared. The second part covers the period from 1575 to 1585 and was published at the same time as the first, also appearing in a later second edition. Finally, the third part was published in Madrid in 1612, and covers the period from 1585 to 1598, ending with the death of the king. In it the author relates the "tumult, rebellions, acts of sedition and treason, uprisings, wars between peoples, captures of cities and castles, sackings, fires, truces, accords, broken treaties, massacres, deaths of princes, and other events from 1554 to 1598." He does not limit himself to the history of Spain, but makes reference to Africa, Asia, the Atlantic Ocean and the Mediterranean Sea, the Pacific Ocean, and the Americas.

=== Other works ===
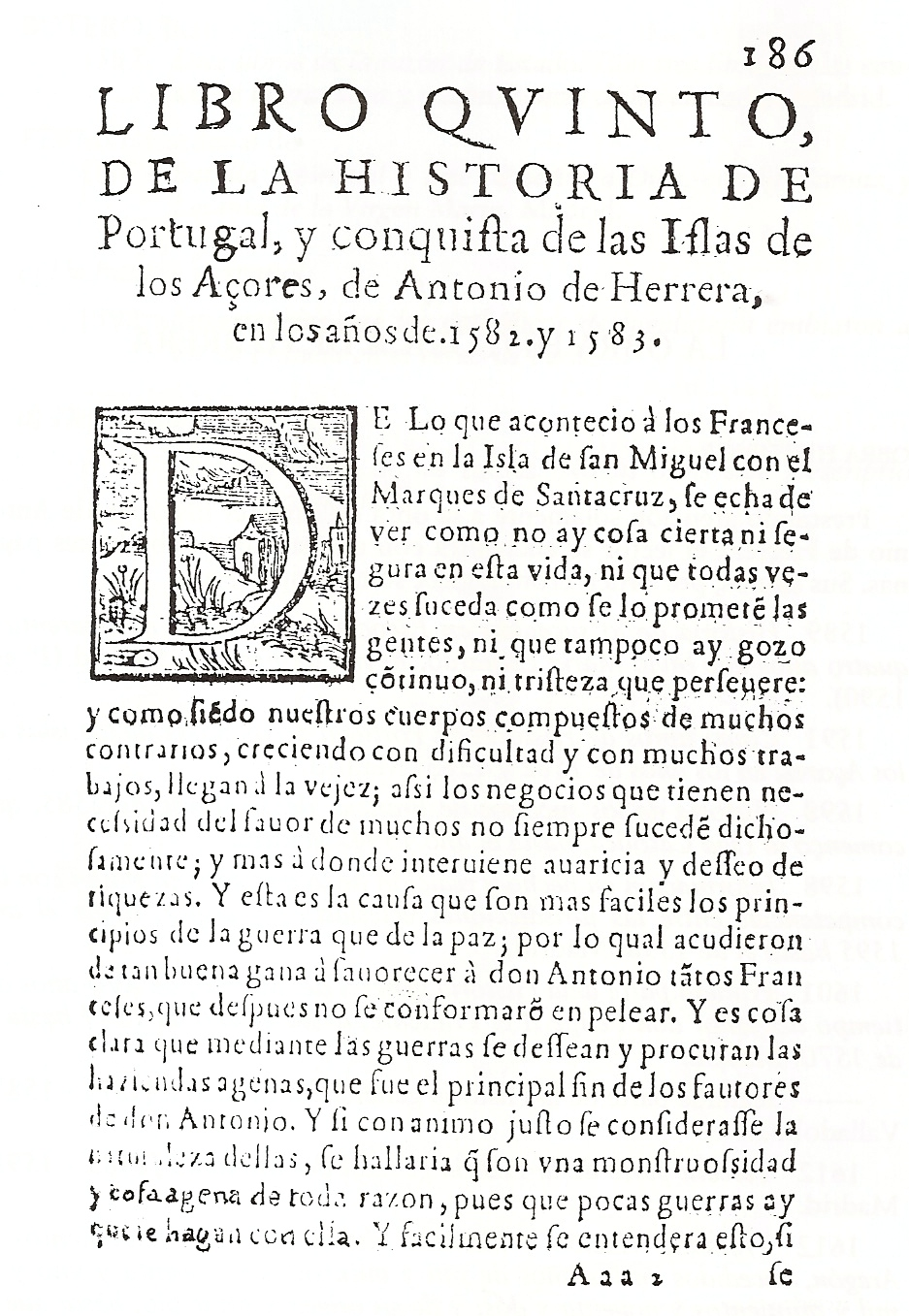
Historia de Portugal

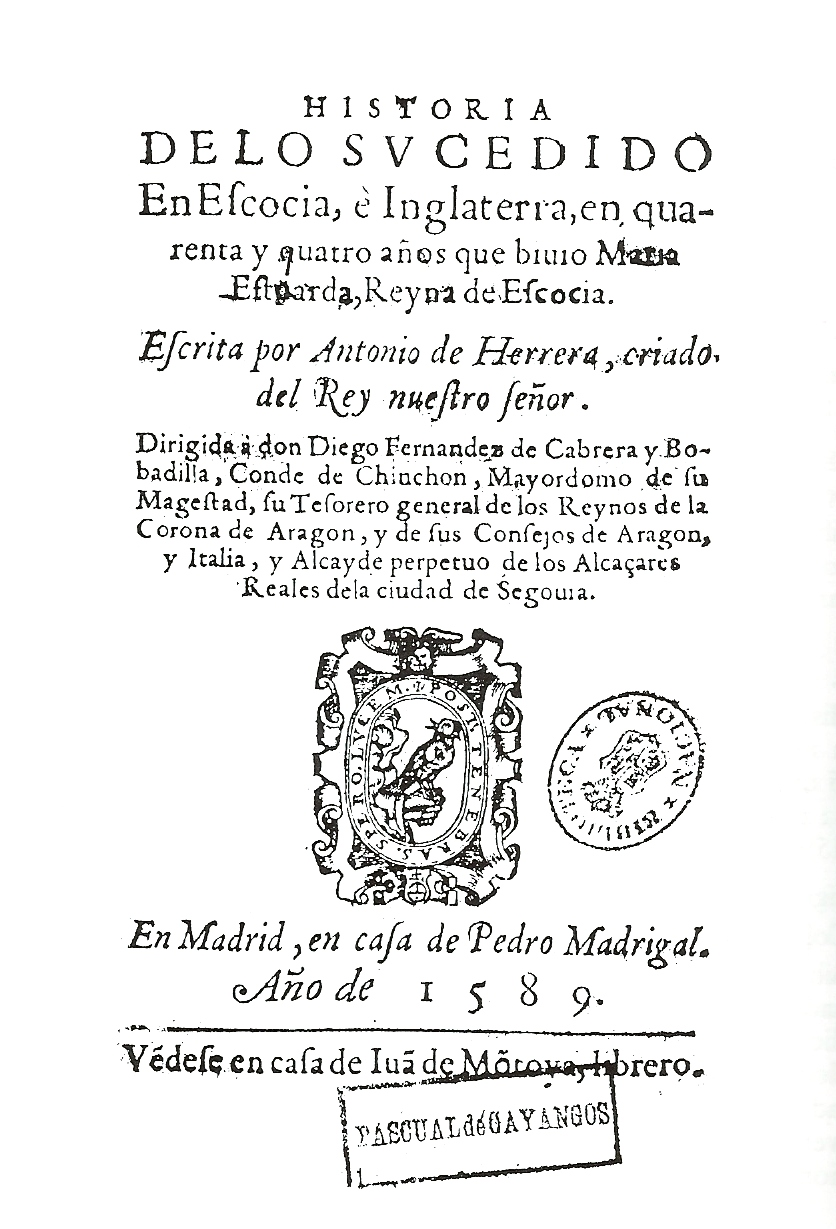
Historia de María Estuardo

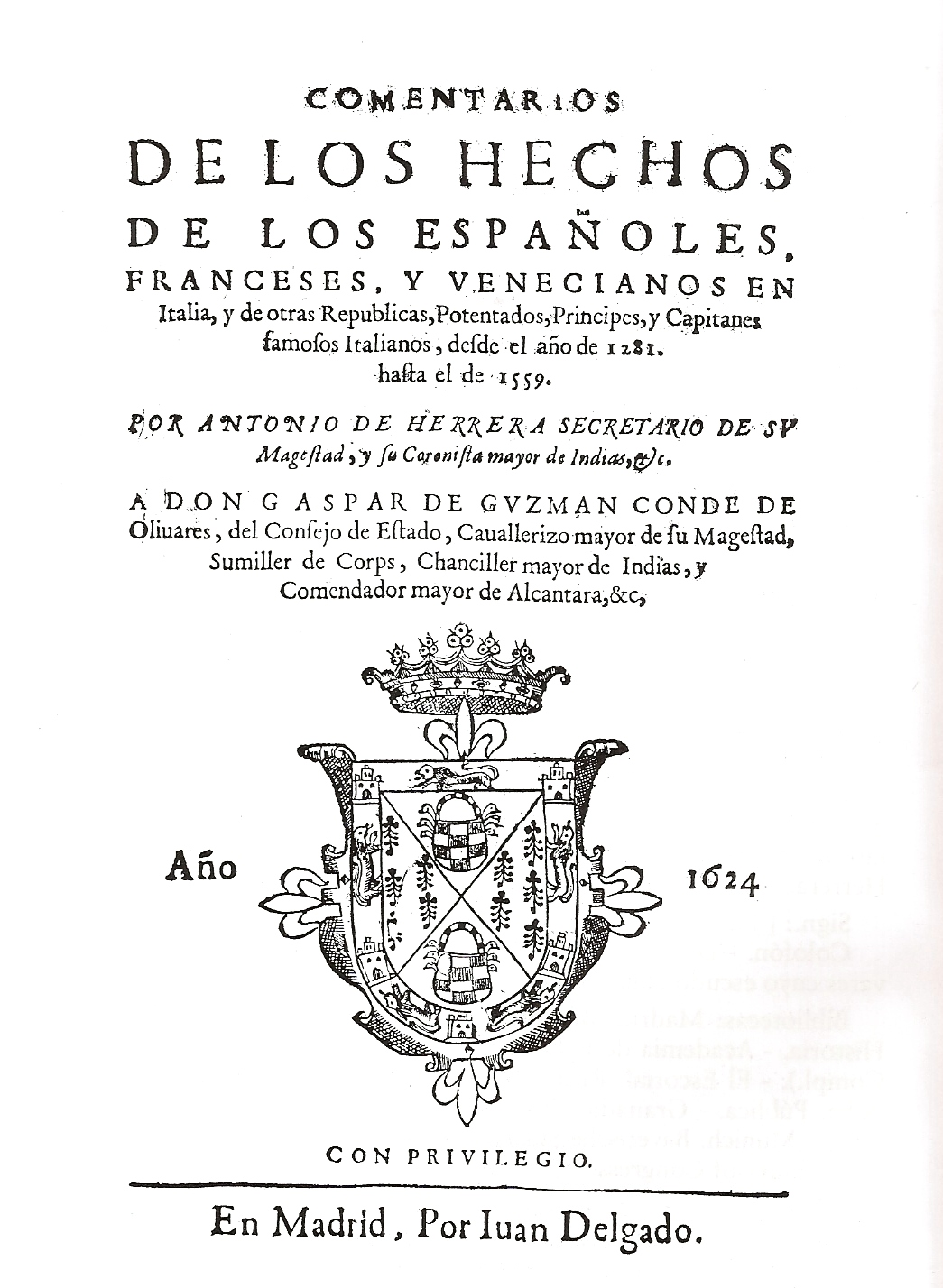
Comentarios

- Historia de Portugal y conquista de las islas Azores (1582), first edition. A second edition was published at the press of Pedro Madrigal, in Madrid in 1591, in five volumes.
- Historia de María Estuardo, whose full title is Historia de lo sucedido en Escocia, è Inglaterra, en quarenta y quatro años que biuio Maria Estuarda, Reyna de Escocia, escrita por Antonio de Herrera..., is devoted to the life of Mary, Queen of Scots. It was published in Madrid in 1589 and the next year in Lisbon under the same title. It was published in Madrid again in 1859, as a bibliographic curiosity.
- Crónica de los Turcos (1598).
- Sucesos de Francia or Historia de Antonio de Herrera, criado de su Majestad, y su Coronista mayor de las Indias, de los sucessos de Francia, desde el año de 1585 que començò la liga Catolica, hasta fin del año 1594 (Madrid, 1598).
- Sucesos de Milán or Informacion en hecho, y relacion de lo que passo en Milan, en las competencias entre las jurisdicciones Eclesiastica y Seglar, desde el año de 1595 hasta el de 1598, escrita por Antonio de Herrera... (1599 and 1609), two editions.
- Tratado de los movimientos de Aragón or Tratado, relacion y discurso historico de los mouimientos de Aragon sucedidos en los años de mil y quinientos y nouenta y vno, y de mil y quinientos y nouenta y dos: y de su origen y principio hasta que... Filipe II... compuso y quieto las cosas de aquel Reyno (Madrid, 1612).
- Comentarios de los hechos de los españoles, franceses y venecianos en Italia, y de otras Repúblicas, Potentados, Príncipes y Capitanes famosos italianos, desde el año 1281 hasta el de 1559 (Madrid, 1624).
- Discursos morales, políticos e históricos inéditos de don Antonio de Herrera, Cronista del Rey don Felipe Segundo, autor de las Décadas de Indias y de otras muchas obras (Madrid, 1804), a work published many years after Herrera's death.

Further works of Herrera are known to us, some of them no longer extant but whose existence is recorded:

- Elogio a Don Baltasar de Zúñiga, Comendador mayor de León, del Consejo de Estado y Presidente del supremo de Italia, de Antonio de Herrera.
- Elogio de Antonio de Herrera, Coronista del Rey... a Don Iuan de Zúñiga.
- Elogio de Vaca de Castro, por Antonio de Herrera.
- Exequias de la Reina Doña Margarita de Austria, muerta el 3 de octubre de 1611, por Antonio de Herrera, impresa por orden y a costa de la ciudad de Segovia.

=== Translations ===
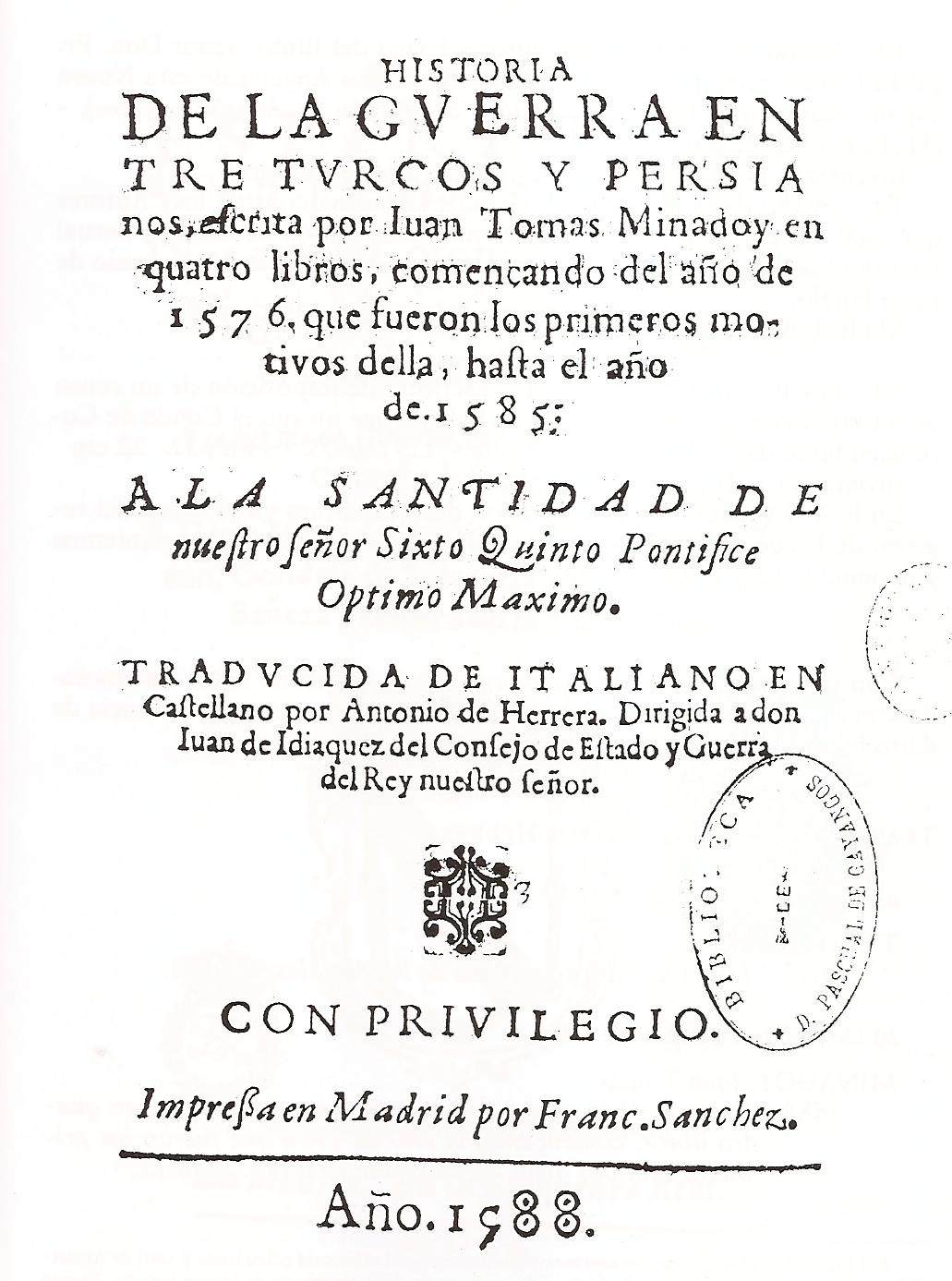
Historia de la guerra entre turcos y persianos

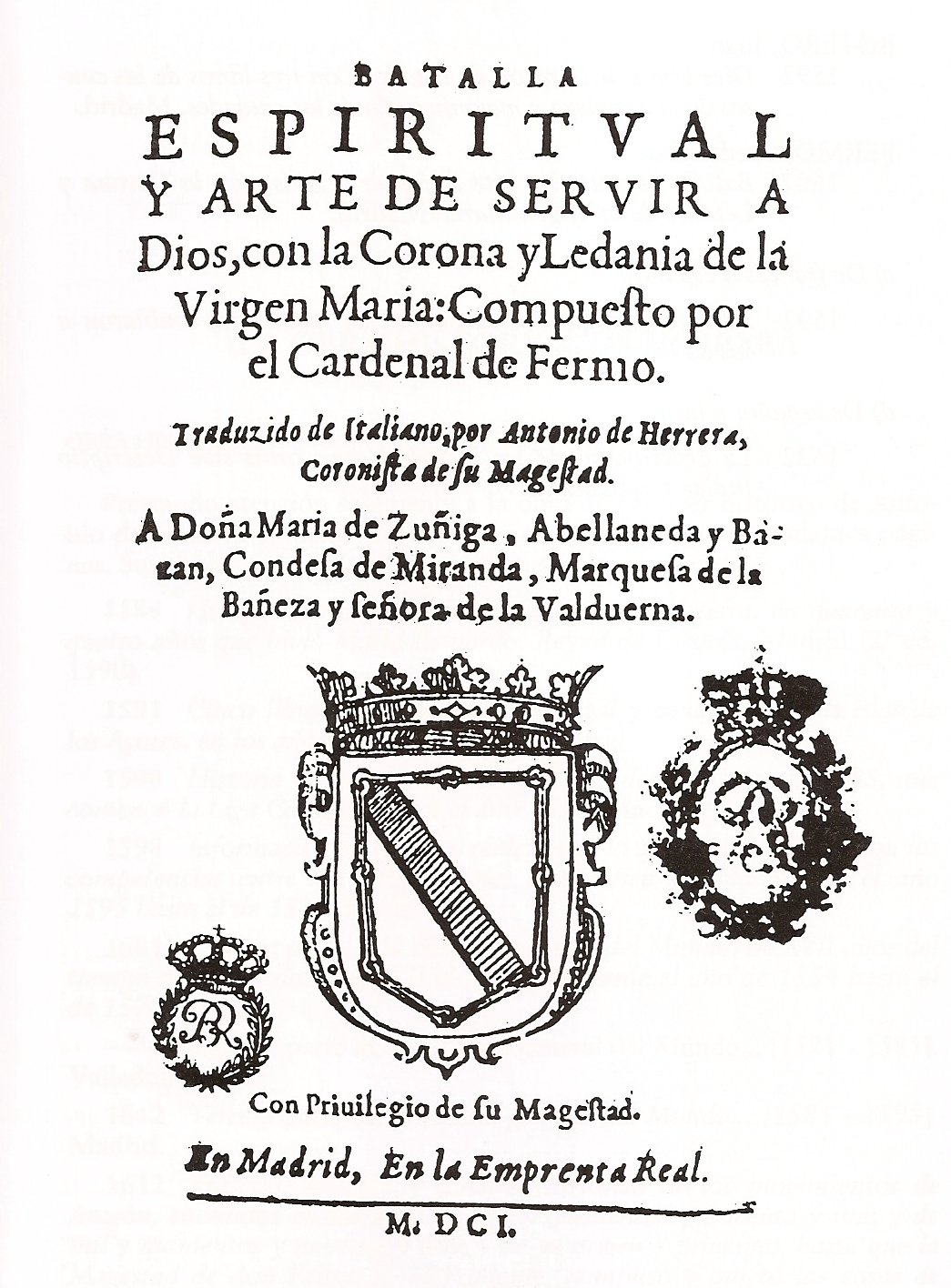
Batalla espiritual

Herrera also undertook translations, including the following:

- Historia de la guerra entre turcos y persianos, escrita por Iuan Tomas de Minadoy... (Madrid, 1588), by Giovanni Tomaso Minadoi da Rovigo. From Italian to Spanish, in four volumes.
- Diez libros de la razón de Estado; con tres libros de las causas de la grandeza, y magnificencia de las ciudades de Iuan Botero (Madrid, 1592), by Giovanni Botero. From Italian to Spanish. It was republished two more times: in Barcelona (1599) and in Burgos (1603).
- Advertencias que los catholicos de Inglaterra embiaron a los de Francia en el cerco de París (1592). From French to Spanish.
- Batalla espiritual y arte de seruir a Dios, con la Corona y Ledania de la Virgen Maria, compuesto por el Cardenal de Fermo... (Madrid, 1607), by Serafino da Fermo. From Italian to Spanish.
- Los cinco libros primeros de los Annales de Cornelio Tacito: que comienzan desde el fin del Imperio de Agusto hasta la muerte de Tiberio... (Madrid, 1615), by Gaius Cornelius Tacitus. From Latin to Spanish.
- Descripción de las Indias Occidentales (1622), his own work, translated into Latin for publication in the Netherlands.

=== Manuscripts ===
About fifteen of his manuscripts are collected in the Biblioteca Nacional de España, including a draft of the Crónica de los Turcos, an essay inspired by the death of the queen of France and other writings on French history, writings on the history of Portugal, 23 essays on the laws and customs of the Canary Islands, and various letters, encomiums, and treatises.

== See also ==
- List of Spanish chroniclers of the Indies

== Bibliography ==
- Catalina García, Juan (1897). "La fecha de la muerte del cronista Herrera" (PDF). Boletín de la Real Academia de la Historia (in Spanish). XXX: 328–332.
- Cuesta Domingo, Mariano (1998). Antonio de Herrera y su obra (in Spanish). Segovia, Spain: Colegio Universitario de Segovia. ISBN 84-89711-14-3.
- Fernández Duro, Cesáreo (1890). "Epitafio de Antonio de Herrera, cronista mayor de Indias, y noticias relativas a la publicación de sus Décadas". Boletín de la Real Academia de la Historia (in Spanish). XVI: 173–177.
- Pérez Pastor, Cristóbal (1894). "Testamento de Antonio de Herrera". Boletín de la Real Academia de la Historia (in Spanish). XXV.
- Pérez Pimentel, Rodolfo (1988). "Antonio de Herrera y Tordesillas". Diccionario Biográfico de Ecuador (in Spanish). Guayaquil, Ecuador: Universidad de Guayaquil. Archived from the original on 2008-10-24.
- Velasco Bayón, Balbino (1996). Historia de Cuéllar (in Spanish) (4th ed.). Segovia, Spain: Diputación Provincial de Segovia. ISBN 84-500-4620-3.
