= Amor es todo invención: Jupiter y Anfitrión =

Amor es todo invención: Júpiter y Anfitrión is a 1721 zarzuela by Giacomo Facco to a libretto by José de Cañizares. A 3CD recording was made by the ensemble Albalonga, conducted by Anibal Cetrangolo for the Belgian label Pavane in 2001.
