= Amor aumenta el valor =

1728 opera

Amor aumenta el valor is a 1728 opera by a collective of composers, the first act being by José de Nebra, the rest by the Italians Giacomo Facco and Filipo Falconi, which premiered in Lisbon in 1728.

== Recording ==
- Amor aumenta el valor - Los Músicos de Su Alteza Luis Antonio González 1CD Alpha
