= Giovanni Tommaso Minadoi =

Medieval Italian physician, diplomat, and historian

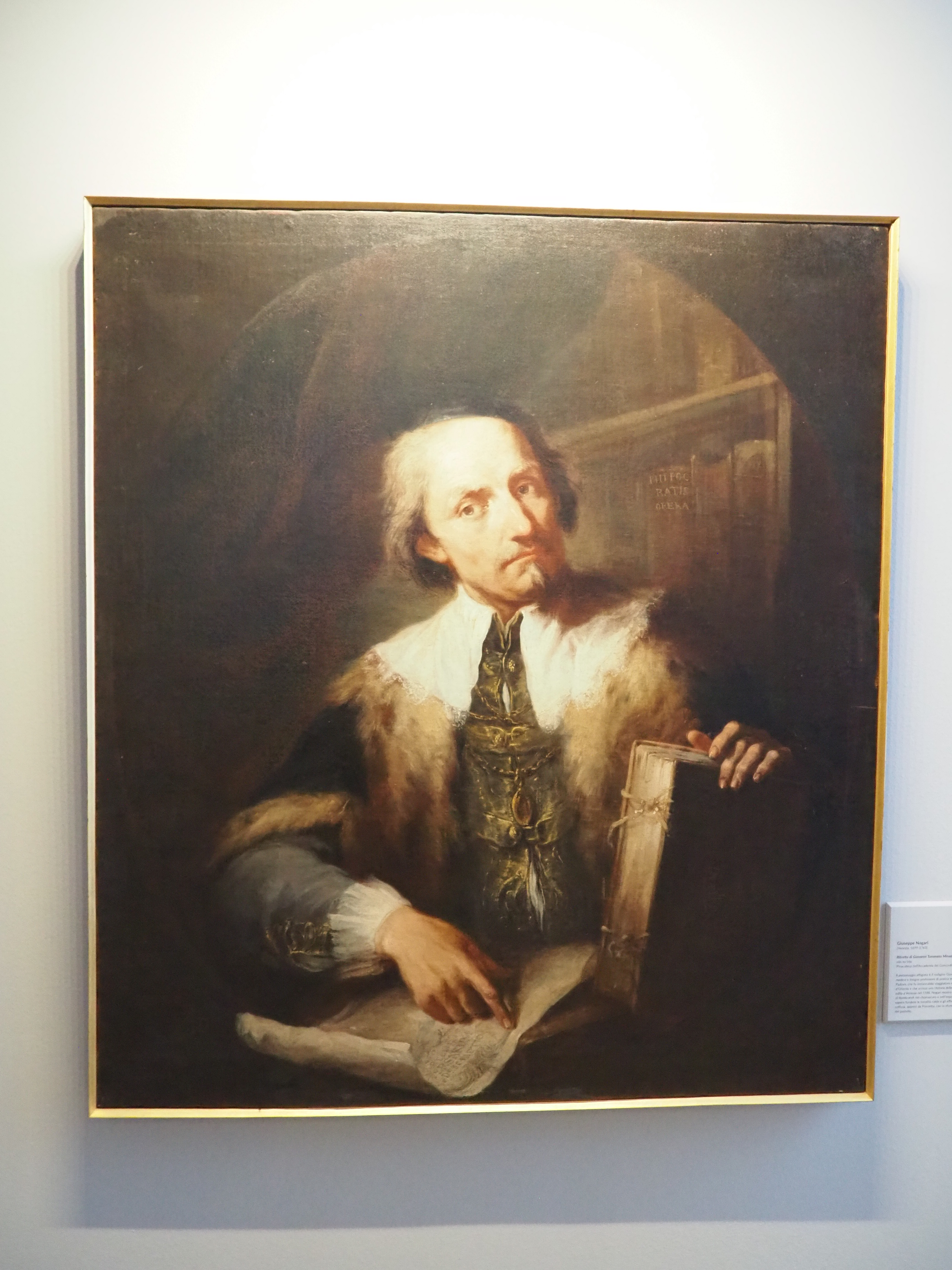
- Portrait of Giovanni Tommaso Minadoi by Giuseppe Nogari in Palazzo Roverella, Rovigo
- Born: c. 1549; Ferrara, Duchy of Ferrara
- Died: May 29, 1615 (aged 65–66); Florence, Grand Duchy of Tuscany
- Burial place: San Gaetano, Florence
- Education: University of Padua
- Occupations: Physician; Diplomat; Historian
- Known for: Historia della guerra fra Turchi et Persiani

Giovanni Tommaso Minadoi (c. 1549 – May 29, 1615) was an Italian physician, diplomat, and historian best known for his firsthand account of the Ottoman-Persian War of 1578-1590. He served as a professor of medicine at the University of Padua and held diplomatic positions representing Venetian interests in the Ottoman Empire.

== Early life and education ==
Minadoi was born in Ferrara, Italy, likely in 1549, to Giovanni Battista Minadoi, a physician, and his wife Enrica. In 1551, his family relocated to Rovigo, where he completed his early education. He then enrolled at the University of Padua, where he earned his doctorate in medicine on March 29, 1576.

== Career ==
=== Medical practice and diplomatic service ===
After graduation, Minadoi practiced medicine in Rovigo, occasionally spending time in Venice, where three of his brothers resided. In 1578, Teodoro Balbi, newly appointed as the Venetian consul in Syria, invited Minadoi to accompany him to Aleppo as his personal physician. Aleppo was then a major commercial hub for trade with Safavids, allowing Minadoi to build a prestigious clientele that included Muslim patients. These connections inspired him to document the war that had broken out in 1578 between Murad III and Mohammad Khodabanda. Minadoi returned to Venice by April 1583.

Shortly after his return, he was hired by the Gonzaga family to treat Duke Guglielmo, who suffered from arthritis and rickets—hereditary ailments in the family. On May 6, 1583, Minadoi arrived in Mantua, but his tenure there was unsuccessful. Despite being responsible for providing consistent care to the Duke, he was lodged in countryside. By February 1584, he requested to be relieved of his position and returned to Venice three months later.

In late 1584, Minadoi accepted a second appointment in Syria, serving under consul Giovanni Michiel, who had previously been the Superintendent of Health. However, in a letter dated March 31, 1585, Minadoi expressed his dissatisfaction with being in "odious and hostile places due to their remoteness, the barbarism of the inhabitants, and the dangers." His acceptance of this role may have been influenced by a lack of better professional opportunities and possible economic interests, as his brother Pietro Maria was engaged in trade with the Levant.

During this second stay in the Middle East, which lasted nearly two years, Michiel entrusted Minadoi with two diplomatic missions to Constantinople: the first mission, from August to December 1585, aimed to obtain a decree from the Sultan to end harassment of Venetian merchants by Turkish officials. After the Porte issued the necessary provisions, Minadoi returned to Aleppo. When the Sultan's orders were disregarded, Minadoi undertook a second mission in April 1586 with the same objective. Additional measures were enacted against corrupt officials, but without better results.

Attacked by Bedouins while on pilgrimage to the Church of the Holy Sepulchre, in September 1586, Minadoi left Ottoman Empire and by December had returned to Venice, traveling via the Peloponnese, as evidenced by his literary references to herbs and medicines he encountered in that region.

=== Later career and academic life ===
On April 26, 1587, Minadoi married Lucia Cezza di Bartolomeo in Rovigo, connecting himself to one of the city's wealthiest and most influential families. The marriage remained childless. That same year, he traveled to Rome, where in the summer he personally delivered his "Historia" to Sixtus V. History of the War between Turks and Persians (Italian: Historia della guerra fra Turchi et Persiani) was published in Rome in 1587, with a new edition in Venice in 1588. A significant translation into Spanish was done in 1598 by Antonio de Herrera. The work stands as one of the few European accounts of the Persian world from this period, which explains its success and numerous editions and translations.

Upon returning to Rovigo, Minadoi joined the Accademia dei Concordi, pursuing his interest in literature.

In July 1589, on his brother Annibale's recommendation, Minadoi was hired by city of Udine as a physician, with a considerable annual salary of 400 ducats. The city's health situation was persistently difficult due to its proximity to the border and frequent conflicts with the Turks in Bosnia. Minadoi remained in Udine for nearly six years, until June 20, 1595, when he unexpectedly resigned. The reasons for this decision are unclear, especially since the city had granted his requested salary increase and inducted him into the noble order. Minadoi retreated to Venice, where he reconnected with members of the pro-curial and pro-Spanish patriciate, who secured him a coveted professorship at Padua, possibly the true cause of his prior dissatisfaction.

On December 19, 1596, Minadoi assumed a position teaching extraordinary practical medicine at the University of Padua. He was well received by students, particularly those of German nationality (which earned him appointment as a Count Palatine on September 19, 1607). His academic career progressed steadily: in 1602, after being inducted into the local Accademia dei Ricovrati, on January 13 he was promoted to teaching practical medicine in the second position. He reached the first position on December 7, 1612, with a salary of 600 florins, a position he maintained until his death.

Minadoi was named a Knight of St. Mark after delivering a speech in August 1612 for the new Doge Marcantonio Memmo. In January 1615, he traveled to Florence at the invitation of Grand Duke Cosimo II de' Medici. He returned to the Medici court three months later but suddenly fell ill with malignant fever and died in Florence on May 29, 1615. He was buried in the Church of Saints Michael and Cajetan.

== Medical philosophy and works ==
A student of Girolamo Mercuriale and Girolamo Capodivacca, Minadoi opposed the innovative Paracelsian, alchemist, and spagyric practitioners, preferring the classical works of Galen, Hippocrates, and Celsus. However, his adherence to the dogmatic school was not unconditional, and methodologically he sought a proper balance between theory and practice. This approach was reinforced by direct experience, although his admiration for Galen sometimes led him to endorse obvious superstitions, such as recommending an amulet made from a snail shell to be hung around children's necks during their first teething.

Galileo Galilei, a colleague at Padua, described Minadoi in 1607 as a man "of pleasing appearance, jovial, and with pleasant and honest manners" but, regarding his professional abilities, confessed not knowing of any "distinguished particular experiences" to highlight.

Minadoi's medical texts can be divided into three groups: those dealing with theoretical-philosophical topics; those of a more technical-practical nature, where Minadoi displays his extensive pharmacological knowledge; and finally, his more ambitious writings.

== Selected works ==
- "Historia della guerra fra Turchi et Persiani" (Rome, 1587; Venice, 1588)
- "De humani corporis turpitudinibus cognoscendis et curandis" (Padua, 1600)
- "De arthritide" (Padua, 1602)
- "De febre maligna" (Padua, 1604)
- "Medicarum disputationum liber primus" (Treviso, 1610)
