= Uberto Zanolli =

Italian composer

Uberto Zanolli Balugani (1917–1994) was an Italo-Mexican composer, conductor, writer, and musicologist. An engineer official for the Italian army during World War II, he was a prisoner in Nazi concentration camps for two years.

== Biography ==
Uberto was the son of Amelia Pìa Balugani Vecchi and Luigi Zanolli Marcolini. In his childhood, he studied violin, viola, piano and composition in the Conservatories of Verona, Bolzano, and Milan. At the age of 17, he made his professional debut as an orchestra director. After the war, Zanolli returned to artistic activities, working in some of the most important theatres in Italy, Switzerland, France, Portugal, Spain and the United States.

=== Family ===
In 1944 his first son, Fausto, was born from his marriage with Elsa Angelini, from whom he was widowed shortly after. From 1953, Zanolli lived in Mexico and in 1959 he married Mexican soprano Betty Fabila, becoming the father of the pianist Betty Luisa Zanolli Fabila.

=== Career ===
He was the docent of the Conservatorio Nacional de Música (1958 - 1960); permanent orchestra director of the Academia de la Opera (1953 - 1960); title holder of the Coro de Bellas Artes (1959-1960) and the Orquesta del Teatro de Bellas Artes (1975).

A naturalized Mexican since 1957, Zanolli dedicated himself to magistery in diverse institutions. He was a professor in the Science faculty and, from 1957 until his death, he taught at the Escuela Nacional Preparatoria, becoming the founder of the corrs La Viga and a General of the ENP (1967). From 1972 to 1987, he was the director of the Department of Music, and from 1987 to 1994, the General Coordinator of aesthetic activities of that institution.

Uberto Zanolli was the founder and director of the Orquesta de Cámara de la ENP-UNAM (1972 - 1994). Within the labor of the cultural diffusion that he created with the OCENP, he made the Didactic Concerts the principal mission. He presented an endless series of performances of composers from diverse times and nationalities, contributing especially to the divulgation of the contemporary Mexican composers.

His name is connected to the rediscovery of an eighteenth-century composer, Giacomo Facco.

== Awards ==
The President of Italy, Antonio Segni, gave Zanolli the title of the Man of the Order of Merit of the Italian Republic (1962), and in Mexico, the Unión de Cronistas de Música y Teatro named him Musician of the Year (1963).

He was a member of the Liga de Compositores Mexicanos de Música de Concierto, and recorded dozens of albums and media in the choral, symphonic and chamber genres with the companies CBS, Musart and Mexico's Voz Viva (UNAM). Because of his important contribution in the play El Arte de la Fuga (The Art of the Fuga), by Johann Sebastian Bach, of which he contributed in the transcription, interpretation, and instrumentation for the chamber orchestra, the Dirección General of the ENP granted him the Medalla de Oro al Mérito Académico (1975). He was also given the Águila de Tlatelolco de la Secretaría de Relaciones Exteriores and, in 1986, the Sindicato Unico de Trabajadores de la Música (CTM) granted him the Lira de Oro; the year in which the Escuela Nacional de Música (UNAM) gave him the Cátedra Extraordinaria Manuel M. Ponce.

== Radio and television ==
He imparted televised courses and radio programs in which they show the cultural programs that he released for the Instituto Politécnico Nacional in collaboration with his wife, Betty Fabila (1960 - 1962), like hundreds of radio broadcasts through XEN 690, a radio station for which he funded and lead the magazine Sele Música for many years. A Music critic since the age of 17, he collaborated in newspapers like Il Gazzetino di Venezia, L'Arena di Verona, Diario de la Nación, Zócalo and El Universal. He participated in seminaries of academic actualization, and offered countless conferences and presentations within the university mark.
