= Giacomo Facco =

Italian composer

Giacomo Facco (4 February 1676 – 16 February 1753) was an Italian Baroque violinist, conductor and composer. One of the most famous Italian composers of his day, he was completely forgotten until 1962, when his work was discovered by composer, conductor, and musicologist Uberto Zanolli.

== Biography ==
Facco was born in Marsango, a small settlement near Padua and Venice in the Republic of Venice. For many years, he was a conductor in Italy. In 1705, he was employed in Palermo as choirmaster, teacher, and violin virtuoso to Carlo Antonio Spinola, Marquis of Los Balbases (the Viceroy of Sicily). In 1708, the viceroy transferred his residence to Messina, and Facco followed him. In Messina, he composed The Fight between Mercy and Incredulity. In 1710, he presented in Messina Cathedral his work The Augury of Victories, dedicated to King Felipe V.

In a report dated 22 January 1720, the Patriarch of the West Indies, Cardinal Carlos de Borja de Centelles and Ponce of León, Archbishop of Trebisonda, wrote that Facco had an excellent pay in the court of the king of Spain (having rejected an offer, of equal pay, by the Portuguese court, where Spinola served as Spanish ambassador). On 9 February, Facco was named clavichord master to the Prince of Asturias, Don Luis, the future King Luis I. Facco subsequently became clavichord master to the future king Fernando VI and, after 1 October 1731, to the future King Carlos III of Spain.

In 1720, while Facco was considered one of the best composers of the time, the city council of Madrid commissioned him to compose an opera on a libretto by Jose de Cañizares. The opera, entitled Love is all Invention, or, Jupiter y Amphitrion, was performed in the Coliseo of the Buen Retiro Palace. It was dedicated to Saints Martha and Mary to celebrate the marriage of Facco's student, the Prince de Asturias, to Isabel of Orleans (which occurred in January 1721). In 1724, he wrote the music for the proclamation feast of Luis I.

Facco fell victim of his scheming colleagues: he slowly lost all of his positions until, in the last years of his life, he was merely a violinist in the orchestra of the Royal Chapel. He died in Madrid on 16 February 1753.

== Works ==
Facco wrote a cycle of twelve concertos for violin, strings and organ with the title of Pensieri Adriarmonici (Thoughts Adriarmonicous), published in Amsterdam, the first book in 1716 and the second in 1718. He also wrote solo cantatas—on his own texts, for he was a skilled poet—these were found at the National Library of Paris, and were presented by soprano Betty Fabila for the first time (conducted by Uberto Zanolli) in 1962 at the Castle of Chapultepec in Mexico City.

Facco must have composed numerous sacred works for the Royal Chapel in Madrid, but this music was probably destroyed, along with many other compositions, in the fire of 1734.

Much of the information about Facco's life and works was discovered by Uberto Zanolli, an Italian-Mexican composer who found Facco's Pensieri Adriarmonici at the Vizcain Library in Mexico City in 1962. Since then, Zanolli has worked on putting together a biography of Facco and a musicological recovery of his work. Among other finds was Facco's birth certificate.

== List of works ==
=== Operas ===
- Le regine di Macedonia (1710)
- I rivali generosi (1712)
- Penelope la casta, Act 3 only (1713; rest by P. Pizzolo)
- Amor es todo imbención: Júpiter y Amphitrión (1721)
- Fieras afemina amor (1724)
- Amor aumenta el valor, loa and Act 1 only (1728; Act 2 by José de Nebra, Act 3 by Philipo Falconi)

=== Solo cantatas on Italian texts ===
- Bella leggiadra Armida
- Clori pur troppo bella
- Emireno d'Egitto
- In grembo ai fiori
- Menzognere speranze
- Or che spunta
- Perchè dici ch'io t'amo
- Sentimi amor
- Vidi su molli erbette

=== Solo cantatas on Spanish texts ===
- Bella rosa
- El trinar
- O qué brillar, cantata a la Virgen Maria
- Si el ave, si la fiera y si la planta

=== Dialogues and serenades ===
- Il convito fatto da Giuseppe ai fratelli in Egitto, dialogo for 4 voices and instruments (1705)
- Augurio di vittorie alla Sacra Real Cattolica Maestà di Filippo V, serenata (1710)
- La contesa tra la pietà e l’incredulità decisa da Maria Vergine, dialogo (1710)
- Festejo para los días de la reyna, serenata for 4 voices and instruments (1722)
- Serenata (Cañizares) for Philip V of Portugal, for 6 voices and instruments (1728)

=== Instrumental music ===
- Pensieri adriarmonici, o vero Concerti a 5, 12 concertos for 3 violins, viola, cello and harpsichord, op. 1 (1720–1721)
- A Select Concerto [...] chose from the Works of Giacomo Facco (1 concerto published in London, 1734)
- a piece published in L'art de se perfectionner dans le violon (Paris, 1782)
- 5 suites and a sinfonia for 2 cellos
- 9 sinfonias and 2 sonatas for 2 cellos (attribution doubtful)

== Recordings ==
- "Pensieri Adriarmonici", 6 Violin Concertos Op.1 no.1-6 / Federico Guglielmo, solo violin - L'Arte dell'Arco / Sony BMG - Deutsche Harmonia Mundi
- "Pensieri Adriarmonici", 6 Violin Concertos Op.1 no.7-12 / Federico Guglielmo, solo violin - Ensemble Albalonga / Pavane Records
- Las Amazonas de España Los Músicos del Buen Retiro
- "Quando en el Oriente" Cantada humana de dos arias con violón - on Venetian composers in Guatemala and Bolivia, with Baldassare Galuppi "De Dios esposa amante", Antonio Pampani "Oy gustoso el corazón" Roberta Pozzer, soprano Sylva Posser, soprano Vincenzo Di Donato, tenor. Albalonga director Aníbal E. Cetrangolo
