= Betty Zanolli Fabila =

Mexican of Italian descent pianist

Betty Luisa Zanolli Fabila (born 1965 in Mexico City) is a Mexican of Italian descent pianist. She is the daughter of Italian-Mexican composer Uberto Zanolli and Mexican soprano Betty Fabila.

== Early life ==
As a pianist and teacher, she specialized in Scholastic Education at the National Conservatory of Music (NCMM). She obtained a doctoral degree in History for her thesis, The Professionalization of Musical Education in Mexico: The National Conservatory of Music (1866–1997). She became a lawyer, via her thesis The right of author in musical matter in Mexico (1813–2004). She studied Ethnohistory (ENAH), as well as the Law of Intellectual Property (NAUM).

== Career ==
In 1984 she became cathedratic of the National Preparatory School. In 1987 she began teaching at the NCMM History of Music, History of Art, Piano, Techniques of Researching and Education Sciences. In the National School of Music (NAUM) she is professor of History of Mexican Music as well in the Faculty of Law (NAUM), where she teaches professional studies, postgrad and open university, in subjects such as Comparative Law, Techniques of Legal Research, Introduction to Civil and Penal Law, Goods and History of Mexican Law. She collaborated in academic-administrative functions for the improvement of education in the NAUM and has been educational of the Faculty of Philosophy and Letters of the NAUM and the National School of Anthropology and Historia.

In the field of the musical interpretation she is dedicated to the diffusion of the pianistic work of 19th and 20th century Mexican composers and the cultural and the artistic influence of Uberto Zanolli. In 1996 the National Council for Culture and Arts gave her economic support to publish the musicological work that Uberto Zanolli made on the Pensieri Adriarmonici of Giacomo Facco.

Zanolli Fabila was piano soloist of the Orchestra of Camera of the NPS (1984–1994).

She became online coordinator and Legal Advisor of Universe of The Owl Magazine, which she cofounded.

In 2006 she became Administrative Secretary of NSM (NAUM).

She is the publisher of the international magazine Conservatorianos.
