= Iphigenia en Tracia =

Iphigenie en Tracia is a zarzuela by José de Nebra, premiered in Madrid, 1747.

== Recording ==
- Marta Almajano, Maria Espada, Raquel Andueza, El Concierto Espanol, Emilio Moreno 2CD Glossa, DDD, 2010
