= Vendado es Amor, no es ciego =

Vendado es Amor, no es Ciego is a 1744 zarzuela by José de Nebra, premiered in Madrid.

== Recording ==
- Vendado es Amor, no es Ciego - Los Elementos, Alberto Miguelez Rouco Glossa 2CD 2020
