= Mitridate Eupatore =

1707 opera by Alessandro Scarlatti

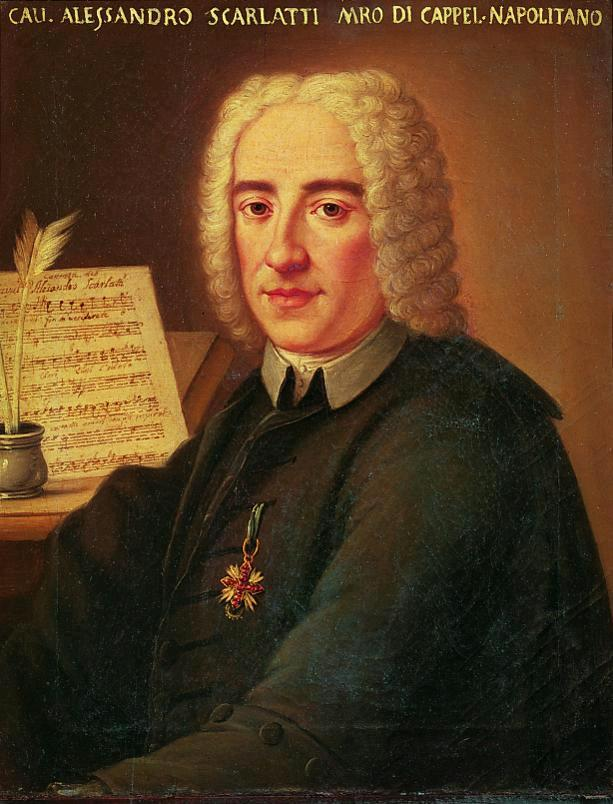
Alessandro Scarlatti

Il Mitridate Eupatore (Mithridates Eupator) is an opera seria in five acts by the Italian composer Alessandro Scarlatti with a libretto by Girolamo Frigimelica Roberti based on Electra (Sophocles) by Sophocles and Electra (Euripides) by Euripides. It was first performed, with the composer conducting, at the Teatro San Giovanni Grisostomo, Venice, on 5 January 1707. A failure at its premiere, Mitridate Eupatore is now considered the finest of Scarlatti's operas.

== Roles ==
Roles, voice types
Role	Voice type
Mitridate, right but dispossessed heir to the throne of Pontus, disguised as Eupatore, ambassador of Ptolemy, king of Egypt	soprano
Stratonica Mitridate's mother, party to the assassination of her husband, and now wife of Farnace	soprano
Laodice Mitridate's sister, married against her will to the peasant Nicomede	soprano
Nicomede Pontus peasant, of noble birth and great heart, married to unwilling Laodice, but without ever trying to consummate their marriage	soprano
Issicratea Mitridate's wife, desguised as Antigono, second ambassador of the king of Egypt	contralto
Farnace Stratonica's former lover and now her husband, usurper of the throne of Pontus	tenor
Pelopida Farnace's minister and confidant	tenor
Mutes: Mitridate Evergete, Stratonica's first husband; Ptolemy, King of Egypt, and Mitridate and Laodice's friend; Cleopatra, Ptolemy's sister

== Synopsis ==
In the ancient kingdom of Pontus, Farnace has seized the throne, killing the king and marrying his wife, Stratonica. The murdered king's daughter, Laodice, has been married to the ruined nobleman, Nicomede, now reduced to working as a cowherd, while her brother, Mitridate Eupatore, has taken refuge in Egypt. Mitridate and his wife, Issicratea, arrive at the court of Pontus disguised as Egyptian ambassadors. They promise Mitridate's head to the usurping king and queen in return for peace between Egypt and Pontus. Mitridate's mother assents to the death of her own son. Mitridate meets his sister Laodice and reveals his true identity. Mitridate and Issicratea assassinate Farnace and Stratonica, and Nicomede announces to the people the return of their rightful king.

== Performances ==
The opera was performed in July 2017 at the Festival de Beaune by Thibault Noally and his ensemble Les Accents. At Teatro alla Scala di Milano a production of the opera starring Maria Callas was planned as the second opera of the 1953-54 season but due to Callas' recent success as Medea this opera was chosen instead. A 1957 BBC broadcast of approximately 80 minutes of music from the opera starred the young Joan Sutherland as Laodice.
