= Anna Maria Torri =

Italian opera soprano (fl. 1684–1708)

- Born: Anna Maria Torri Cecchi; Italy
- Other name: La Beccarina
- Occupations: Soprano; court musician
- Years active: fl. 1684 – c. 1708
- Style: Opera

Anna Maria Toro (fl. 1684 – c. 1708), sometimes given as Anna Maria Torri Cecchi, was an Italian soprano known by the nickname La Beccarina. Her earliest known performance on the opera stage was in Reggio Emilia in 1684. She was a court musician in the employ of the Duke of Mantua from 1688 to 1691, and then the Duke of Parma from 1691 to 1695. From 1699 to 1708, she was active as an opera singer in Venice during which time she performed in the premieres of several works by composer Carlo Francesco Pollarolo. In 1707 she created the role of Esilena in the premiere of George Frideric Handel's Rodrigo. Her final known performance was in the title role of Francesco Gasparini's La Statira in 1708.

== Biography ==
Anna Maria Torri was possibly a native of Bologna, Italy. It is speculated that she was the sister of composer Pietro Torri. Her first known performance was in Reggio Emilia in 1684 when she portrayed Flora in Alessandro Melani’s La calma fra le tempeste, overo Il prencipe Roberto fra le sciagure felice.

Torri entered the service of Ferdinando Carlo Gonzaga, Duke of Mantua, as a court musician on 20 May 1688. The document signed by the Duke on the occasion stated, "As Anna Maria Torri possesses not only the virtue of modesty but also the gift of song—which wins her universal applause no less than our own appreciation—we have chosen to appoint her our Virtuosa and Active Servant." (Note: Italian: "Possedendo Anna Maria Torri oltre la virtù della propria modestia, quella ancora del canto per cui si concilia l'applauso universale, non meno che il nostro aggradimento, habbiamo voluto dichiararla nostra Virtuosa e Serva Attuale.") At this period in Italian opera history, it was common for court singers to travel frequently with their noble patrons acting as their agents to ensure they were paid by the theatres that they travelled to perform in. As Duke Gonzaga's Virtuosa, she performed in venues in Genoa, Piacenza, Parma, and Venice.

In 1688 Torri performed the role of Roselena in the premiere of Marc'Antonio Ziani's Il gran Tamerlano which was given at the Santi Giovanni e Paolo, Venice. It was dedicated to Ferdinando de' Medici, Grand Prince of Tuscany. She portrayed Laodicea in the first staging of Carlo Ambrogio Lonati's Antioco, principe della Siria which was given in Genoa at the Teatro del Falcone in 1690. In Parma she performed in Bernardo Sabadini's Il favore degli dei which was staged to celebrate the 3 April 1690 wedding of Odoardo Farnese, Hereditary Prince of Parma and Countess Palatine Dorothea Sophie of Neuburg. On 1 May 1691 Torri became a court musician in the service of Ranuccio II Farnese, Duke of Parma; remaining a musician in the Parma court under his successor Francesco Farnese until 15 February 1695.

From 1699 to 1708 Torri was active as an opera singer in Venice. She performed in multiple operas by Carlo Francesco Pollarolo staged at the San Giovanni Grisostomo, Venice; including Il ripudio di Ottavia (1699, as Poppea) and Il colore fa la regina (1700, as Gelida). In 1703/1704 she portrayed Lucinda in Pollarolo's Vincislao re di Polonia (the pastiche version of his Venceslao, re di Polonia) at the Teatro del Cocomero during the Carnival season. In 1704 she sang the part of Virtù in Pollarolo's serenata Dalla Bellezza, Virtù ed Amore which was performed on the Venice Grand Canal in front of the Palazzo Coccina. In 1707 she portrayed Esilena in the premiere of George Frideric Handel's Rodrigo at the Teatro del Cocomero.

Torri's final known performance was in the title role of Francesco Gasparini's La Statira in 1708. After this nothing is known of the singer; including when and where she died.

== Notes and references ==
=== Bibliography ===
- Besutti, Paola (1989). La corte musicale di Ferdinando Carlo Gonzaga ultimo duca di Mantova (in Italian). Gianluigi Arcari. ISBN 9788888499765. OCLC 35627396.
- Landgraf, Annette; Vickers, David, eds. (2009). The Cambridge Handel Encyclopedia. Cambridge University Press. ISBN 9780521881920.
- Pietropaolo, Domenico; Parker, Mary Ann (2011). The Baroque Libretto: Italian Operas and Oratorios in the Thomas Fisher Library at the University of Toronto. University of Toronto Press. ISBN 9781442641631.
- Rosselli, John (1995). Singers of Italian Opera: The History of a Profession. Cambridge University Press. ISBN 9780521426978.
- Ryszka-Komarnicka, Anna (2021). "Apostolo Zeno's Venceslao (Venice 1703) and its Pasticcio Version Vincislao re di Polonia (London 1717). A Case Study With Stops in Florence, Milan and Naples". In Over, Berthold; Nieden, Gesa zur (eds.). Operatic Pasticcios in 18th-Century Europe. Contexts, Materials and Aesthetics. Transcript Verlag. ISBN 9783839448854.
- Samper, Maria de los Angeles Perez (2016). "A Queen between Three Worlds: Italy, Spain, and France". In Palos, Joan-Lluis; Sanchez, Magdalena S. (eds.). Early Modern Dynastic Marriages and Cultural Transfer. Routledge.
- Selfridge-Field, Eleanor (2007). The Calendar of Venetian Opera: A New Chronology of Venetian Opera and Related Genres, 1660-1760. Stanford University Press. ISBN 9780804744379.
- Waeber, Jacqueline (2022). The Cambridge Companion to Seventeenth-Century Opera. Cambridge University Press. ISBN 978-1108915915.
