= Júpiter y Semele =

1718 zarzuela opera by Antonio de Literes

El estrago en la fineza, Júpiter y Semele is a Spanish-language zarzuela opera by Antonio de Literes to a libretto by José de Cañizares, premiered 9 May 1718 at the Teatro de la Cruz, Madrid. A recording was made of a live performance by Eduardo López Banzo in 2003.
