= Betty Fabila =

Mexican opera singer (born 1929)

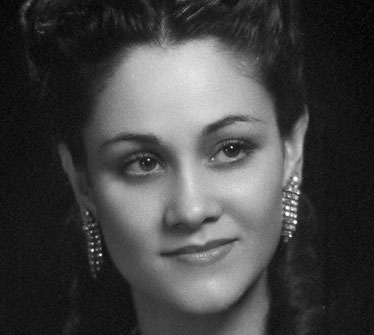
Betty Fabila

Betty Fabila Herrerías (28 May 1929 – 7 August 2012) was a Mexican soprano opera singer and biologist.

Born in Mexico City, she studied at Mexico's National Conservatory of Music and the National School of Music at the National Autonomous University of Mexico under the baritone David Silva. In 1950, she made her operatic debut as Musetta in La bohème at the Palacio de Bellas Artes in Mexico City and went on to sing leading roles there in operas including La traviata, Madama Butterfly, L'amico Fritz, Faust, Carmen, La serva padrona, Il segreto di Susanna, Werther, and Don Giovanni

With her husband, the Italian conductor and musicologist Uberto Zanolli, she also developed programs for Mexican television. She later became a biologist and ethnologist and taught at the Escuela Nacional Preparatoria where she was a founding member of the school's chamber orchestra and its served as its soprano soloist from 1972 to 1994.

In 1962, at the Castle of Chapultepec in Mexico City, Fabila gave the first modern performances of solo cantatas by the Italian baroque composer Giacomo Facco, whose scores had been discovered by her husband in the National Library of Paris.

Zanolli and Fabila's daughter, Betty Zanolli Fabila, is a classical pianist and music teacher. Fabila died on 7 August 2012 at the age of 83.

== Sources ==
- Díaz Du-Pond, Carlos, La ópera en México de 1924 a 1984: testimonio operístico, Universidad Nacional Autónoma de México, 1986
