= José Antonio Nebra Mezquita =

Spanish organist

José Antonio Nebra Mezquita (1672–1748) was a Spanish organist and harpist.

He was the father of José de Nebra. He was also the organist of the Collegiate church of Santa María in Calatayud most likely before 1697.
