= Fin de fiesta =

Short theatrical piece in the Spanish Golden Age tradition

A fin de fiesta is a short theatrical piece in the Spanish Golden Age (Siglo de Oro) tradition performed after the comedia in order to send the audience home in a festive mood. This was first performed in 1798.
