= Al Ayre Español =

Spanish vocal and instrumental ensemble

Al Ayre Español is a vocal and instrumental ensemble specialized on early music founded in 1988 by harpsichordist Eduardo López Banzo.

The name of the ensemble was inspired by the title for a guitar fugue of the Calanda, Aragón, composer Gaspar Sanz. In this fugue, he indicated the musician to play with "ayre español" (in the Spanish way).

Banzo has done a great deal to restore the Spanish Baroque musical heritage and in recognition of this work, the group was awarded the Premio Nacional de Música by the Spanish Ministry of Culture. In 2004, Al Ayre Español became an orchestra, broadening out their repertory to encompass much of the European Baroque.

== Discography ==
- 1994 - Barroco Español - Vol. I: "Mas no puede ser". Villancicos. Cantatas et al. Deutsche Harmonia Mundi 05472 77325 2
- 1995 - Barroco Español - Vol. II: "Ay Amor". Zarzuelas. Deutsche Harmonia Mundi 05472 77336 2
- 1997 - José de Torres and Juan de Navas Barroco Español - Vol. III: "Quando muere el sol". Música penitencial en la Capilla Real de Madrid. Deutsche Harmonia Mundi 05472 77376 2
- 1998 - Antonio de Literes: Los Elementos. Ópera armónica al estilo italiano. Deutsche Harmonia Mundi 05472 77385 2
- 1999 - José de Torres: Cantadas. Spanish Solo Cantatas (18th century). Deutsche Harmonia Mundi 05472 77503 2
- 1999 - Quarenta horas. Deutsche Harmonia Mundi 74321 72619 2
- 2001 - Antonio de Literes: Acis y Galatea. Deutsche Harmonia Mundi 05472 77522 2
- 2001 - José de Nebra: Miserere. Deutsche Harmonia Mundi 05472 77532 2
- 2003 - Antonio de Literes: Júpiter y Semele. Júpiter y Semele o El estrago en la fineza. Harmonia Mundi Ibérica 987036.37 (2 CDs)
- 2004 - A Batallar Estrellas. Música de las Catedrales españolas del s. XVII. Harmonia Mundi Ibérica 987053
- 2005 - La Cantada Española en América. Harmonia Mundi Ibérica 987064
- 2006 - José de Nebra: Arias de Zarzuelas. Harmonia Mundi Ibérica 987069
- 2007 - Handel: Amadigi di Gaula, opera. Ambroisie AM 133
- 2008 - Handel: Rodrigo, opera. Ambroisie AM 132
- 2011 - José de Nebra: Esta dulzura amable. Sacred Cantatas. Challenge
- 2012 - Handel Memories". A selection from Grand Concertos op. 6. Challenge
- 2015 - Georg Friedrich Händel - To all Lovers of Musick Sonatas Op. 5 (Challenge Classics CC72663)
- 2019 - Georg Friedrich Händel - Trio Sonatas Op. 2 (Challenge Classics CC72797)
