= Viento es la dicha de amor =

Viento es la dicha de amor is a 1743 zarzuela by José de Nebra, premiered in Madrid.

== Recording ==
- Viento es la dicha de amor - Limoges Baroque Ensemble Christophe Coin 2CD
