= Donde hay violencia, no hay culpa =

Donde hay violencia, no hay culpa is a 1744 zarzuela by José de Nebra, premiered in Madrid.

== Recording ==
- Donde hay violencia, no hay culpa - Alicia Amo, Natalie Perez, Giulia Semenzato, Judit Subirana, Los Elementos, Alberto Miguelez Rouco Glossa 2022
