= Acis y Galatea =

Zarzuela by Antonio de Literes to a libretto by José de Cañizares

Acis y Galatea is a zarzuela by Antonio de Literes to a libretto by José de Cañizares. It was first performed on 19 December 1708 in Madrid at the theatre Real Coliseo del Buen Retiro in the Buen Retiro Palace for the 25th birthday of King Philip V. It is based on Ovid's story of the Acis and Galatea myth in his Metamorphoses. The soprano aria "Confiado jilguerillo" [The confident goldfinch] is the opera's most popular number. A recording by Al Ayre Español was issued on Deutsche Harmonia Mundi in 2001.
