= Septem verba a Christo =

Septem verba a Christo in cruce moriente prolata is a cycle of Good Friday cantatas, based upon Christ's words on the cross attributed to Giovanni Battista Pergolesi.
