= Il Trionfo della divina Giustizia =

Il Trionfo della Divina Giustizia (Naples 1716) is the second oratorio of Nicola Porpora.
