= Los elementos =

Italian opera

Los elementos is a 1705 chamber opera by Antonio de Literes, described by composer as Ópera armónica al estilo italiano. The 1718 version was recorded in 1998 by Al Ayre Español for Deutsche Harmonia Mundi.
