= Cristóbal Pérez Pastor =

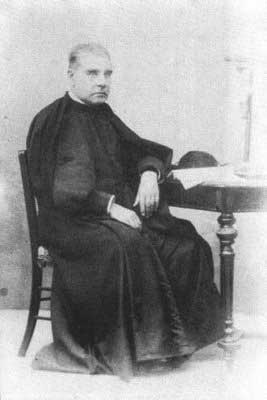

Cristóbal Pérez Pastor (1833–1906) was a Spanish archivist and literary historian.

== Works ==
- La imprenta en Toledo [Printing in Toledo], 1887
- Bibliografía madrileña del siglo XVI [Madrid bibliography of the 16th century], 3 vols, 1891, 1906, 1907
- La imprenta en Medina del Campo [Printing in Medina del Campo], 1895
- Proceso de Lope de Vega [Trial of Lope de Vega], 1901
- Nuevos datos acerca del histrionismo español en los siglos XVI y XVII [New facts relating to Spanish acting in the 16th and 17th centuries], 1901
- Documentos cervantinos, 2 vols, 1897–1902
- Documentos para la biografia de Calderon, 1905
- Noticias y documentos... recogidos por... Pérez Pastor, 4 vols, 1910–1926
