= Comedia (play) =

Three-act play of the Spanish Golden Age

In the Spanish Golden Age (Siglo de Oro) tradition, a comedia is a three-act play combining dramatic and comic elements. The principal characters are noblemen (galanes; sg.: galán) and ladies (damas) who work out a plot involving love, jealousy, honor and sometimes also piety or patriotism. Supporting characters include comical servants (graciosos) who assist their employers in carrying out the action.

The hybrid form of theatre largely developed in the late 16th and early 17th centuries. Largely created and defined by the poet-playwright Lope de Vega, the style is defined by a mixture of tragedy and comedy. Originally referred to loosely as "tragicomedy", the name was eventually shortened to simply "comedia". Dr. Sebastián Francisco de Medrano, founder and president of the Medrano Academy (1616–1622), became the commissioner of the Spanish Inquisition, official censor of comedias.

== See also ==
- Commedia dell'arte
