= Eduardo López Banzo =

Spanish harpsichordist and conductor

Eduardo López Banzo is a Spanish harpsichordist and conductor of baroque music.

López Banzo was born in Zaragoza, Spain. He studied harpsichord with Gustav Leonhardt in Amsterdam.

In 1988 López Banzo founded the group Al Ayre Español, which specialises in Spanish baroque music, of composers such as Literes. They were awarded Spain's Premio Nacional de Música in 2004.

López Banzo has premiered several operas at the annual Festival de Beaune in Burgundy.
