= Antonio de Literes =

Spanish composer

Antoni de Literes, also known as Antonio de Literes or Antoni Literes Carrión (18 June 1673 – 18 January 1747), was a Spanish composer of zarzuelas. As with other national forms of baroque opera, Literes's stage works employ a wide variety of musical forms – arias, ariettas and recitative (accompanied and unaccompanied) as well as dance movements and choruses, though here mingled with spoken verse dialogue. His use of the orchestra follows French and Italian practice in including guitars, lutes, and harpsichords amongst the continuo instruments.

== Life ==
Literes was born on 18 June 1673 in Mallorca. From 1693, after the exile of his predecessor Sebastián Durón, Literes became the Master of the Capilla Real de Madrid, playing the bass viol and soon being accounted the greatest Spanish court composer of his time. He died on 18 January 1747 in Madrid.

== Zarzuelas ==
His most famous work was Acis y Galatea (1708), to a libretto by José de Canizares, which enjoyed frequent performances in Madrid's Spanish court and public theatres until at least 1774. After 200 years of neglect it was recorded on CD in 2003 by Al Ayre Español, with an enthusiastic critical response. Another of his best zarzuelas is Júpiter y Sémele (1718), to a text by the same author. This survived in manuscript form in Évora and has also been successfully recorded by Al Ayre Español. The earlier through-sung, allegorical opera in Italian style Los elementos and the partially extant Júpiter y Danae have also been successfully revived.

=== Zarzuelas ===
- Júpiter y Yo, los cielos premian desdenes (1699) attributed
- es:Júpiter y Danae (1700).
- Acis y Galatea (1708).
- Ceronis.
- Con música y con amor (1709).
- Antes difunta que ajena (1711).
- Hasta lo insensible adora (1704) attributed
- El estrago en la fineza, Júpiter y Semele (1718).
- Celos no guardan respeto (1723).
- Los elementos (c. 1718).

=== Sacred Cantatas ===
- Four Sacred Cantatas (c. 1720.)

== Discography ==
- 1998 – Los Elementos. Ópera armónica al estilo italiano. Al Ayre Español. Deutsche Harmonia Mundi 05472 77385 2
- 2001 – Acis y Galatea. Al Ayre Español. Deutsche Harmonia Mundi 05472 77522 2
- 2003 – Júpiter y Semele o El estrago en la fineza. Al Ayre Español. Harmonia Mundi Ibérica 987036.37 (2 CDs)
- 2004 – Júpiter y Danae. Capella de Ministrers/ Blau CD 190 (2-CDs)
- 2021 - [Sacred Cantatas for Alto] Carlos Mena, Concerto 1700 17* 170003

== Bibliography ==
- Antoni Pizà. Antoni Literes: Introducció à la seva obra (Palma de Mallorca: Edicions Documenta Balear, 2002) ISBN 84-95694-50-6
- Acuña, Maria Virginia (2022), "Enamorados ridículos: acerca del humor y la parodia en Acis y Galatea (1708)," Cuadernos de Música Iberoamericana Vol. 35: 171–191.
