= Raquel Andueza =

Spanish soprano

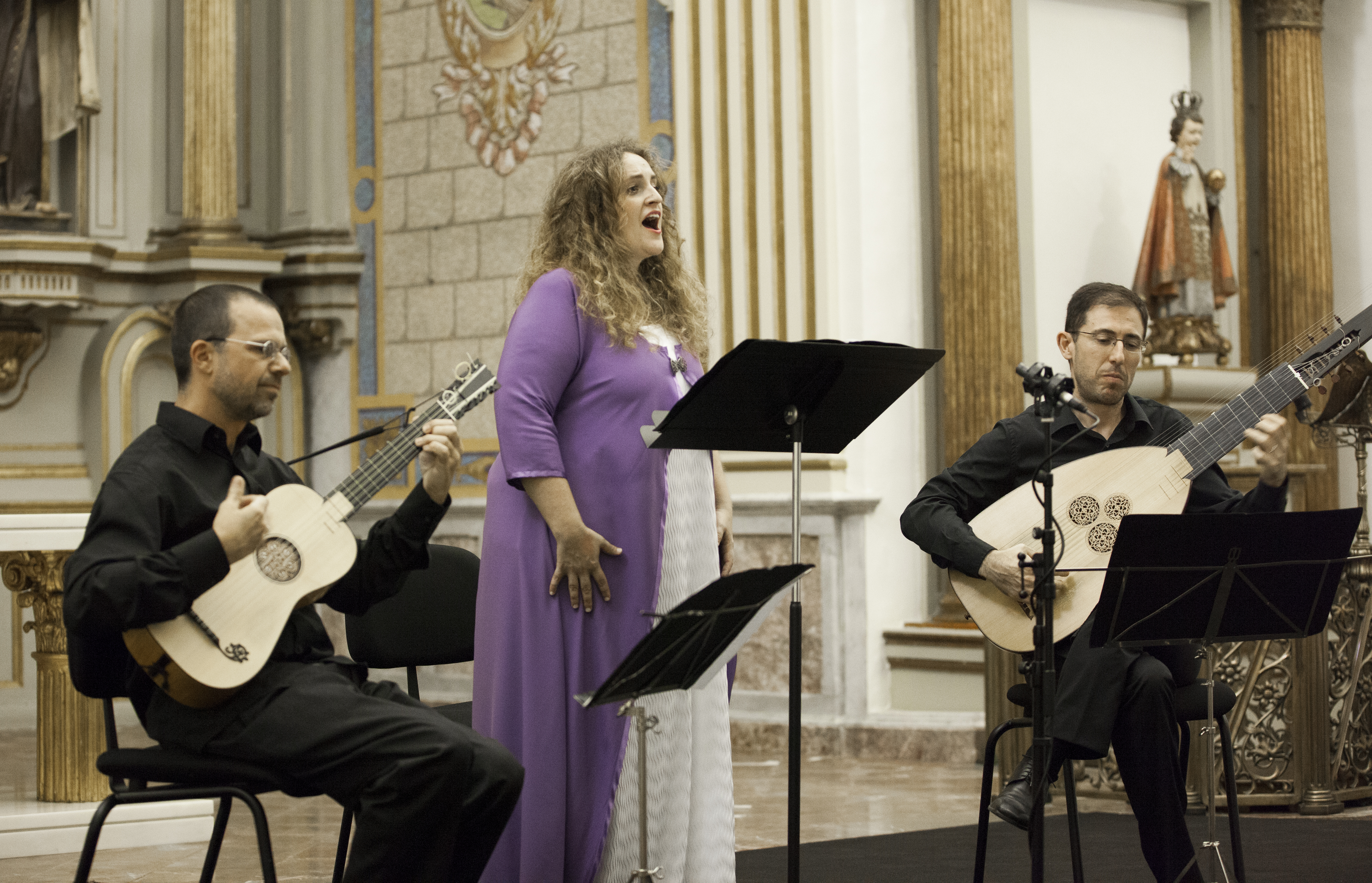
Raquel Andueza (Music Festival San Sebastián)

Raquel Andueza (born December 6, 1980, in Pamplona) is a Spanish soprano. She has been a member of La Colombina vocal quartet led by baritone Josep Cabré since 2003. In 2011 she launched her own record company Anima e Corpo.

== Selected recordings ==
- Josep Pla (composer): Stabat Mater. Manuel Pla: Salve Regina - Raquel Andueza, soprano, Pau Bordás, bass, Orquesta Barroca Catalana, dir. Olivia Centurioni, LMG 2011.
- Sebastián Durón: Tonadas. Raquel Andueza. Manuel Vilas. Naxos.
- Pedro Rabassa: Et In Terra Pax Music for the Cathedral of Seville. Raquel Andueza, La Hispanoflamenca. Orquesta Barroca de Sevilla. Enrico Onofri.
- Giacomo Facco: Las amazonas de España (1720). María Luz Álvarez, Raquel Andueza, Los Músicos del Buen Retiro. dir. Isabel Serrano, Antoine Ladrette
- Johann Rosenmüller: "Beatus Vir?" - Beatus Vir; Jubilate Deo; Misericordias Domini; Coelestes Spiritus; Nisi Dominus; Salve mi Jesu, Sonatas. Raquel Andueza, Wolf Matthias Friedrich, Gli Incogniti, Amandine Beyer. Zig Zag Territoires.
- José de Nebra: Requiem. Los Músicos de Su Alteza
- D'amore e tormento, Tarquinio Merula, Barbara Strozzi, Alessandro Piccinini, Stefano Landi, Benedetto Ferrari, Maurizio Cazzati, Johannes Kapsberger Claudio Monteverdi. Raquel Andueza, Jesús Fernández Baena, theorbo
- Yo soy la locura - songs by Henri de Bailly, José Marín, Benedetto Sanseverino, Gaspar Sanz, Jean-Baptiste Lully, Lucas Ruiz de Ribayaz, Juan Hidalgo. Raquel Andueza, soprano. Jesús Fernández Baena, theorbo. Pierre Pitzl, guitarra barroca. La Galanía
- In Paradiso - canciones sacras y morales italianas del s. XVII. Domenico Mazzocchi, Tarquinio Merula, Giovanni F. Sances, Benedetto Ferrari, Claudio Monteverdi. Raquel Andueza, Jesús Fernández Baena, theorbo.
- Martin y Soler: Villancicos 1769. María Luz Álvarez, Raquel Andueza, Jordi Domènech, Joan Cabero. Escolanía del Real Monasterio de San Lorenzo de El Escorial. Real Capilla Escurialense. Lyra Baroque Orchestra. Jacques Ogg. Glossa.

With A Private Musicke, Pierre Pitzl:

- Alonso Mudarra. 1546. Accent
- Alfabeto Songs Guitar Songs from 17th-century Italy. Giovanni Stefani, Giovanni Girolamo Kapsberger, Giovanni Paolo Foscarini, Marcantonio Aldigiatti de Cesena, Flamminio Corradi, Francesco Corbetta, Girolamo Montesardo, Tarquinio Merula, Bartolomeo Barbarino, Gaspar Sanz, Francesco Corbetta. Raquel Andueza, Theresa Dlouhy, Private Musicke, Pierre Pitzl, Accent Records 2012

With El Concierto Español or Orphénica Lyra:

- Música en el ‘Quijote’. Luys Milán, Juan Aranes, Alonso de Mudarra, Francisco Guerrero, Antonio Martín y Coll A. de Ribera, Diego Ortiz, Gabriel Mena, Diego Pisador, Luys de Narváez. Nuria Rial, Raquel Andueza, Jordi Domenech, Orphénica Lyra. José Miguel Moreno, vihuela and direction. Glossa
- Antonio Caldara: Il Piu Bel Nome, Maria Espada, Raquel Andueza, Robin Blaze, El Concierto Español, Emilio Moreno Glossa Records 2 CDs
- Jose de Nebra: Iphigenie en Tracia zarzuela, Madrid, 1747. Marta Almajano, Maria Espada, Raquel Andueza, El Concierto Español, Emilio Moreno Glossa Records 2 CDs
- La Tirana Contra Mambrú, The Tonadilla and popular musical comedies in Spain c. 1800. Blas de Laserna: La Tirana Del Tripili; El Desenganado; No Aparece La Tirana; La Tirana Se Despide. Pablo Esteve: Los Payos De Malbrú. Jacinto Valledor: La Cantada Vida Y Muerte Del General Malbru. Raquel Anudueza, Marta Infante, Juan Sancho, Jordi Ricart, El Concierto Español, Emilio Moreno. Glossa

With More Hispano:

- Yr a Oydo, More Hispano, dir. Vicente Parrilla.
- Glosas, More Hispano, dir. Vicente Parrilla.

With L'Arpeggiata and Christina Pluhar:

- Mediterraneo - Mísia, Nuria Rial, Raquel Andueza, Vincenzo Capezzuto, Katerina Papadopoulou. Virgin Classics 2013
- Music for a While - Improvisations on Henry Purcell, Erato 2014
- Los pajaros perdidos, Virgin
- Monteverdi Vespers, Virgin

As a member of La Colombina, dir Josep Cabré:

- Guerrero K617
- Victoria Ad vesperas K617
- Ensaladas K617
- Victoria Officium Glossa

As a member of La Trulla De Bozes, Carlos Sandúa:

- Sevilla circa 1650 Passacaille

As a soloist with other choirs:

- Victoria Requiem Officium Defunctorum, 1605. Vadam et circuibo civitatem. Musica Ficta Raúl Mallavibarrena
- Juan de Aragüés: Ah De Las Esferas! Música para la Capilla de la Universidad de Salamanca. Academia de Música Antigua de la Universidad de Salamanca. Bernardo García-Bernalt
