= Marta Almajano =

Spanish soprano

Marta Almajano (Zaragoza) is a Spanish soprano. She was part of Al Ayre Español from its foundation in 1987 until 2004, and often in connection with this group, been part of the revival of baroque zarzuelas such as “Tetis y Peleo” by Juán de Roldan, “Acis y Galatea” of Antonio de Literes, and “Viento es la dicha de Amor” by José de Nebra. She teaches singing at the Escuela Superior de Música de Cataluña, in Barcelona.

== Discography ==
Solo recitals

- Del Amor... La canción romántica española. Songs from the Spanish Romantic era. Marcial del Adalid y Gurréa, Mariano Rodríguez de Ledesma, Manuel del Pópulo Vicente García (tenor, 1755–1832), Ramón Carnicer, Lázaro Núñez-Robres. Marta Almajano (soprano), Michel Kiener (piano) Harmonia Mundi HMI 987032 2003
- Per un bacio. Música vocal del Seicento italiano. with Luca Pianca and Vittorio Ghielmi HMI 987058
- José Martínez de Arce, Juan Hidalgo and Juan del Vado ¡Ay, dulce pena!. Tonos humanos del siglo XVII español. Juan Carlos Rivera (vihuela) HMI 987028
- Sebastián Durón, Antonio Literes, Antonio Martín y Coll, Ay Amor. Arias de Zarzuelas barrocas. Al Ayre Español Eduardo López Banzo. DHM-BMG05472 77696 2
- Música en tiempos de Goya. José Castell, Pablo Esteve and Antonio Guerrero. La Real Cámara. Emilio Moreno. Glossa GCD 920303
- Música en tiempos de Velazquez. Songs by Juan Hidalgo and José Marín. La Romanesca. José Miguel Moreno. Glossa GCD 920201
- Las mujeres y cuerdas. Songs by Vicente Martín y Soler, Mauro Giuliani, and Fernando Sor. with José Miguel Moreno. Glossa GCD920202
- Al alva venid. Enzina, Fuenllana, Mudarra. La Romanesca, José Miguel Moreno. Glossa GCD920203
- Luys De Narvaez: El Delfín de Música. with Juan Carlos Rivera (vilhuela). Almaviva DS-0116 1999

With ensembles

- Juan Frances de Iribarren. Pardiobre. Cantadas y Villancicos inéditos de la catedral de Málaga. Orquesta Barroca de Sevilla. Director: Alfredo Bernardini Discos Prometeo. OBS-003
- Antonio Literes Júpiter y Semele. zarzuela. Al Ayre Español 2CD HMI987036/37
- José de Nebra: Miserere. Al Ayre Español DHM-BMG 05472 77532 2
- Literes: Acis y Galatea. Al Ayre Español DHM-BMG 05472 77522 2
- José de Torres: Cantadas. Al Ayre Español DHM-BMG 05472 77503 2
- Literes: Los Elementos. Al Ayre Español DHM-BMG05472 77385 2
- José de Nebra: Viento es la dicha de Amor. zarzuela Ensemble Baroque de Limoges Christophe Coin. 2CD Auvidis/Valois V 4752
- Heinrich Biber: Requiem, Agostino Steffani Stabat Mater. Gustav Leonhardt DHM-BMG 05472 77344 2
- Juan de Araujo: L’or et l’argent du haut-Péru. Marta Almajano (soprano), Maîtrise Boréale, Ensemble Elyma Gabriel Garrido K617 K617038 M7 867
- Antonio de Literes, Juan Francés de Iribarren Cantadas - Mas no puede ser. Al Ayre Español DHM-BMG 05472 77325 2
- Boccherini. Aria Accademica G557. Ensemble Baroque de Limoges Astrée-Auvidis E 8517
- A century of Spanish Baroque Music. Al Ayre Español Fidelio 9205 1993
