= Cantus Records =

Spanish classical music record label

Cantus Records is a Spanish classical music record label based in Madrid founded in 1996 by José Carlos Cabello. Cabello originally was one of the founders in 1991 of the Glossa Records label led by José Miguel Moreno and Emilio Moreno.

The label's first release was Bestiarum by La Reverdie. Artists included Musica Ficta, La Venexiana, Dominique Vellard. Then followed a hiatus in releases, La Venexiana and Vellard returning to Glossa. New releases began appearing again from 2011.
