= Jaime Torrens =

Spanish composer

Jayme Torrens (1741-1803) was a Spanish composer who was maestro de capilla at Málaga Cathedral after Juan Francés de Iribarren.

== Recorded works ==
- "Serpiente venenosa" Maria Espada, David Sagastume, Orquestra Barroca de Sevilla Diego Fasolis, Almaviva 2006
- "Guiados de una estrella", "O Adalid invencible", "Soberano Señor" Maria Espada, José Hernández-pastor, Orquestra Barroca de Sevilla, Fasolis, Prometeo 2008
