= Mariano Rodríguez =

Mariano Rodríguez may refer to:

- Mariano Rodríguez de Ledesma (1779-1847), Spanish composer
- Mariano Rodríguez Vázquez (1909-1939), Spanish anarcho-syndicalist politician
- Mariano Rodríguez (painter) (1912-1990), Cuban painter
- Mariano Rodríguez (football manager) (born 1990), Venezuelan football manager
