= Juan Pérez Roldán =

Juan Pérez Roldán (1604–1672) was a Spanish composer. He was born in Calahorra and likely died in Zaragoza, Spain. Roldán began as a choirboy at Calahorra Cathedral in 1617. He was appointed maestro de capilla at the collegiate church of Berlanga in 1636, Calahorra Cathedral in 1639, Málaga Cathedral in 1642, La Encarnación in 1648, Las Descalzas in 1655, Segovia Cathedral in 1664, León Cathedral in 1671, and finally spent his last years at El Pilar de Zaragoza, 1671–1672. He also served briefly as the claustrero and choirmaster at the Toledo Cathedral in 1636, and presbyter and the king's chaplain in 1661.

A letter from King João IV of Portugal in 1654 describes Roldán's fame, but also describes him as "lazy and prone to attributing others' work to himself". In 1670, while being presbyter and the king's chaplain, as well as maestro de capilla at La Encarnación and Segovia Cathedral, he disappeared, breaking all of his commitments and taking all of this scores and belongings. In 1671, while working at the León Cathedral, his debts were forgiven and he was given 300 ducats in exchange for giving his scores back to the church. Given his reluctance to turn his scores over to the church throughout his lifetime, it is believed that he died in Zaragoza, where most of his scores are preserved in various cathedrals around the city.

== Works ==
- Offices of the Dead
  - Liberame Domine - San Lorenzo de El Escorial
  - Parce mihi Domine - San Lorenzo de El Escorial
  - Regem cui omnia vivunt - San Lorenzo de El Escorial
  - Taedet animam meam - Segovia Cathedral
- Hymns
  - Ave maris stella - Segovia Cathedral
  - Cogitavit Dominus - Segovia Cathedral
  - Misericordiae Domini - Segovia Cathedral
- Motets
  - Crux fidelis - Zaragoza Cathedral
  - Dulcissima Maria - Zaragoza Cathedral
  - Introduxit me rex - San Lorenzo de El Escorial
  - Sepulto Domino - Madrid
- Secular Music
  - Tetis y Peleo - zarzuela (revived by Marta Almajano and others)
