= Félix Anaut =

Spanish painter

Coordinates: 50.854147°N 0.555185°W

Felix Anaut in his studio in France

Félix Anaut (born Zaragoza, 1944) is a Spanish painter whose work is based in Abstract Expressionism and Figurative Monumentalism.

== Education and background ==
Felix Anaut studied at the École de Montparnasse d’art et dessin in Paris in 1978–79, and has lived in Madrid, Tangier, Ibiza, London, Belfast, County Donegal. In 1986 he became a member of the Association of Irish Artists. Finally, after 20 years living in South West France, he moved his studio to Valencia in 2021.

In 2005 Felix Anaut was listed by the Spanish national newspaper, El Mundo, in their annual year review as one of the most influential personalities in the Arts, 2005–2006.

== Exhibitions ==
He has exhibited widely since 1978 and has had many solo and group shows internationally in institutions, galleries and art fairs.

Notable recent events have included exhibitions at the Contemporary Art Centre CAM in Mont-de-Marsan France; The James Wray Gallery, Belfast, Northern Ireland, UK; The Barnard Gallery, Cape Town; The Zimmer Stewart Gallery, England, UK; BBK (Bilbao Bizkaia Kutxa) Foundation, Bilbao; Caja Rural de Aragon Foundation, Zaragoza; The Factory, Brussels; Galerie Brulée, Strasbourg; The Menier, with Zimmer Stewart Gallery, London.

== Collections ==
Felix Anaut's work is held in numerous private and public collections worldwide, including The British Museum London; Casoria Contemporary Art Museum, Naples; The Ulster Museum, Northern Ireland; Instituto Cervantes (Dublin & Bordeaux); BBK (Bilbao Bizkaia Kutxa) Foundation, Bilbao; Caja Rural de Aragon Foundation, Zaragoza; Marzelles Museum, France; The Simonow Collection, France.

In 2010 a comprehensive book, Felix Anaut, his life and work was published with text by the European art collector and author of several artists monographs, Michael Simonow. The book covers the artist's life to date, with accompanying photographs, approximately 120 colour plates of the artists work.

In 2021, an agreement was reached with the town hall of Moncrabeau, Lot et Garonne, in S.W. France, for the establishment of ECFA (Espace Culturelle Felix Anaut). An art and cultural centre with a large collection of works from the artist, due to open in 2024.

== Visual music & Synaesthesia ==
A current theme of Anaut's work is his inspiration from Baroque music, interpreted by him onto canvas.

Following his "London Symphony" exhibited in 2010 with Zimmer Stewart Gallery, Felix Anaut presented his "Zaragoza Visual Symphony" an exhibition of large paintings accompanied by music written by Gonzalo Alonso specifically for this event, in Zaragoza in May 2011. The piece includes an aria written by Felix Anaut and which was sung by the international soprano Marta Almajano. The whole project was accompanied by a catalogue, CD recording and video. With a very innovative installation, the project was curated by Carlos Buil & Ricardo Marco, and sponsored by the Caja Rural de Aragon Foundation.

Following this theme and Anaut's interest in the merging and crossing over of the arts, in 2016 an exhibition was held at the Menier Chocolate Factory in London, hosted by the Zimmer Stewart Gallery, with a collaboration with the poet Lemn Sissay, who had visited the artist's studio in France in 2015. A video was also produced and shown titled "Synaesthesia", with both Felix Anaut & Lemn Sissay working in the studio, and the voice of Diana Rigg reciting Sissay's poetry, and incorporating the musical composition from the Zaragoza Symphony by Gonzalo Alonso and the voice of soprano Marta Almajano.

== Bibliography ==
Felix Anaut's work has been recorded in many publications, catalogues and books including:

- Felix Anaut, Visual Music & Poetry, Zimmer Stewart Gallery at The Menier, London, 2016
- Félix Anaut dans la collection Simonow (Abstractions 2003-2013), Abbaye Flaran, France 2014
- Félix Anaut, Baroque Blue, 99 Mount Gallery, London, 2013
- Felix Anaut, At The Factory, Brussels, 2013
- “Melodias Vascas”, BBK & Ikeder, Bilbao, Spain, 2012
- “Felix Anaut”, Barnard Gallery, Cape Town, 2011
- "Felix Anaut, His life & Work" by Michael Simonow, 2010
- "Zaragoza Symphony - Felix Anaut", Cajalón, Zaragoza, Spain, 2011
- "Genius Loci" College of Architects of Aragon, Cajalon and Zaragoza City Council, Zaragoza, Spain, 2009
- "No Hay Camino, Se Hace Camino Al Andar - Felix Anaut", France, 2006
- "100 Artists for a Museum" Casoria Contemporary Art Museum, Naples, Italy, 2005
- "NU" Centre d’Art Contemporain Raymond Farbos, Mont de Marsan, France, 2005
- "Los Artistas, Picasso, Miró, Bacon, Anaut", ARTTANK, Belfast, Northern Ireland, 2000
- "Drawings, Paintings and Sculpture, the Catalogue", Ulster Museum, Belfast, 2000
