= Pedro de Mena =

Spanish sculptor (1628-1688)

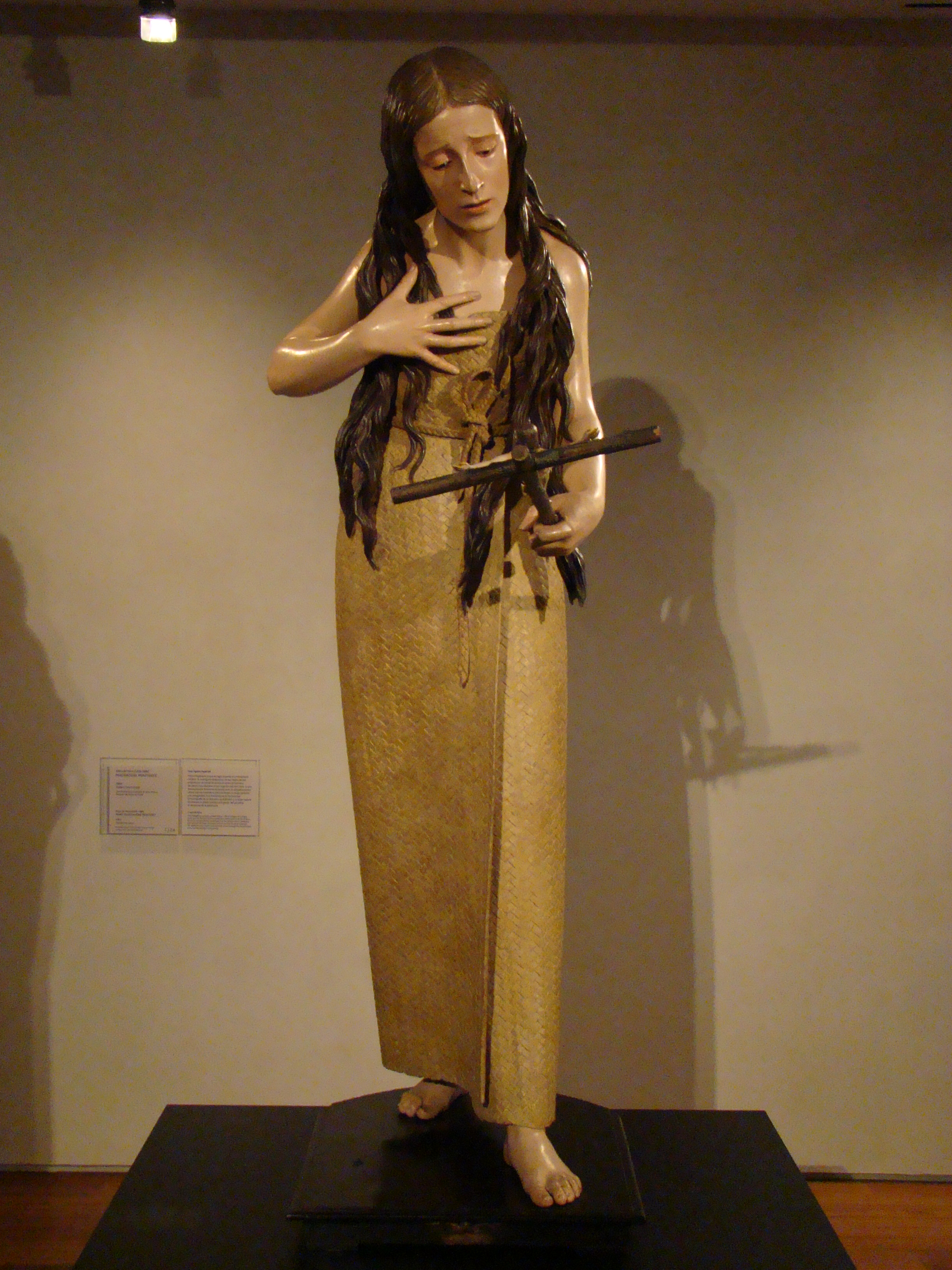
Pedro de Mena Magdalena penitente ni Penitent Mary Magdalene by Pedro de Mena in National Museum of Sculpture, Valladolid.

Pedro de Mena y Medrano (August 1628 - 13 October 1688) was a Spanish sculptor.

== Biography ==
Pedro de Mena was born in Granada, Andalusia. He was a pupil of his father Alonso de Mena as well as of Alonzo Cano. His first success was achieved in work for the convent of St. Anthony Granada, including figures of St Joseph, St Anthony of Padua, St Diego, St Pedro Mentara, St Francis, and St Clare.

In 1658 he signed a contract for sculptural work on the choir stalls of the cathedral of Málaga, this work extending over four years. Other works include statues of the Madonna and child and of St Joseph in Madrid, the polychromatic figures in the church of St Isodoro, the Magdalena and the Gertrudlis in the church of St Martin (Madrid), the crucifixion in the Nuestra Señora de Gracia (Madrid), the statuette of St Francis of Assisi in Toledo, and of St Joseph in the St Nicholas church in Murcia. Mena traveled to Madrid in 1662.

Between 1673 and 1679 Mena worked at Córdoba. About 1680 he was in Granada, where he executed a half-length Madonna and child (seated) for the church of St. Dominic.

Mena died in Málaga, city where he spent most of his life, and where he had a sculpture studio for thirty years until his death in 1688.

Mena and José Mora may be regarded as artistic descendants of Juan Martínez Montañés and Alonzo Cano, but in technical skill and the expression of religious motive his statues are unsurpassed in the sculpture of Spain. His skill to sculpt nude figures was remarkable. Like his immediate predecessors, he excelled in the portrayal of contemplative figures and scenes.
