= Paquita Escribano =

Spanish singer

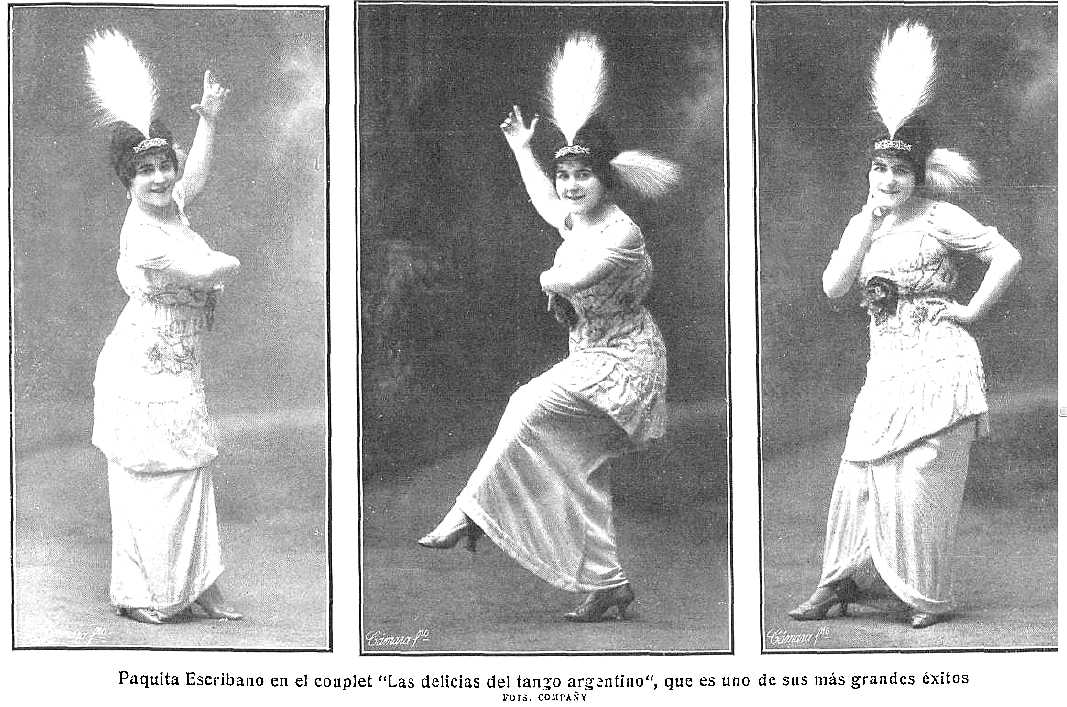
Paquita Escribano (1914)

Paquita Escribano (Zaragoza, 1880 - Valencia, 1970) was a popular Spanish singer. A cupletista and tonadillera, she recorded 39 albums. Among her most popular songs were Ven y ven (La mejicana), El polichinela, El apache moderno, La mariposa, Tirana del Tripilí, La foot-balista, Mimosa, ¿Solo o con leche?, La cucaracha, Zulina, la esclava, Bella samaritana and La guitarra agarena. She retired to Valencia with her husband where she died in 1970.

== Biography ==
Escribano was a Spanish tonadillera, a magnified and glorified vaudeville singer. Her single act constituted the entire performance, and featured the Spanish song type known as Cuplé. Characterized as being "one of the best of the type", she was not widely understood and accepted in some parts of South America. She was considered as unusually handsome with black hair and dark eyes.
