= Teresita Zazá =

Spanish singer (1893–1980)

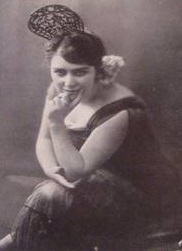
- Teresita Zazá in 1920
- Born: Teresa Juliana Lucía Maraval Torres; June 6, 1893; Plasencia, Spain
- Died: January 23, 1980 (aged 86); Barcelona, Spain
- Occupations: Singer (tonadillera and cupletista); Film actress

Teresa Juliana Lucía Maraval Torres (stage name, Teresita Zazá; Plasencia, Spain, June 6, 1893 - Barcelona, Spain, January 23, 1980) was a Spanish tonadillera, cupletista, and actress who also made a career in Argentina. In Spain, she performed in the Teatre Principal, Teatro Romea, and Teatro Maravillas. In Argentina, she was a performer at the Odeon Theater, Teatro Splendid, Teatro Marconi, Teatro Avenida, Teatro Comedia, Teatro Empire, Teatro Nuevo, Teatro Nacional, and Teatro Florida/Galería Güemes. Her film debut occurred in 1929, in La del Soto del Parral.

== Career ==
Teresa Juliana Lucía Maraval Torres was the daughter of Francisco Maraval, a native of Perpignan, France, and a railroad accountant, and Inocencia Torres, a native of the city of Plasencia. Her brothers were Gastón and Luciano.

The Trianon Palace (now Teatro Alcázar), an honored place with the cuplé genre, announced her as Zazá; she began her artistic career in 1912, at the age of nineteen. In 1915, she arrived in Argentina, where she developed the most important stage of her career. Among her most outstanding hits, was Hora del té in 1913, an Argentine-style tango by Álvaro Retama and Ricardo Yust. She made several presentations at the renowned Teatro Español in Santa Rosa, La Pampa and at the small Teatro Florida in Pasaje Guemes, in Buenos Aires. She was one of the first to use the term Alirón in a song celebrating the victories of Athletic Bilbao.

In 1917, she was part of the show in honor of Manolita Rosales, who was saying goodbye to the city, along with the duo Carlos Gardel and José Razzano and the tonadilleras Emilia Benito and Antonia Costa. In 1922, Zazá worked in Buenos Aires, in a film program under the direction of maestro Carlos Macchiavelli along with three debutant artists: the Spanish dancer, Natividad Álvarez ("Nati, la bilbanita") and the national singer, Mario Pardo. Zaza was directed by Humberto Cairo. During her long stay in Argentina, Zazá made several performances at the Teatro Esmeralda (now Teatro Maipo). She recorded impressive seasons with the Italian transforming Leopoldo Fregoli, the singer Carlos Gardel, and the Galician dancer, La Belle Otero, among others.

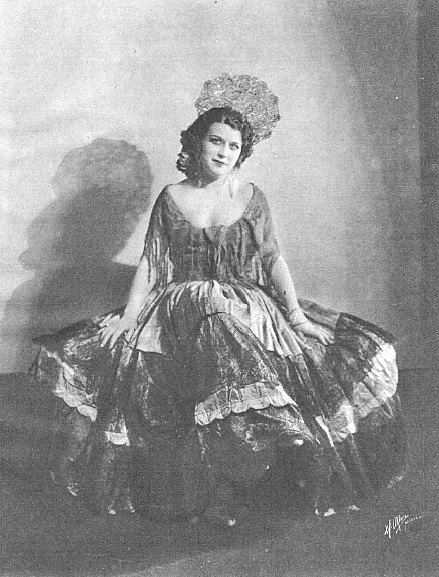
Teresita Zazá (1928)

In 1923, Zazá ended her stay in Buenos Aires, to begin her artistic tour in Lima, Peru, continuing to Panama, Havana, Cuba, and Mexico City, Mexico. In 1927, she reappeared in Spain in Barcelona at the Teatre Principal before removing to Madrid, performing at the Teatro Romea and Teatro Maravillas, where she ended her career as a singer on May 22. From that date on, she settled in Madrid. In 1929, she debuted as a film actress in the Spanish film La del Soto del Parral, with José Nieto and Carranque de los Ríos in the leading roles.

== Selected works ==
=== Performed themes ===
- ¡Hijo mío!
- Pajarito Cantor
- Presentimiento
- ¡Mujercita mía!
- ¡Pobre Madre!

=== Theater in Argentina ===
- 1916: Odeon Theater, Mar del Plata, Buenos Aires, with Carlos Gardel-José Razzano duo, the actress Orfilia Rico, the dancer Pastora Imperio
- 1916: Teatro Splendid (now Cine Ducal), with the French dancers "Los Demos" and the Gardel-Razzano duo
- 1917: Teatro Marconi, the performance of the operetta La Duquesa del Bal Tabarín, with Manola Rosales, Rosario Guerrero, Steffi Csillag, Roberto Casaux, the Gardel-Razzano duo
- 1917: Teatro Avenida, organized by the Diario Crítica
- 1917: Teatro Comedia, performs the play La fuerza ciega
- 1918: Teatro Empire, an evening to raise funds for the Caja Social de la Asociación de Empleados Municipales
- 1918: Teatro Nuevo, a program in honor and for the benefit of the singer Pepita Avellaneda
- 1919: Teatro Avenida, a festival organized by the Argentine and International Actors Societies, in honor and for the benefit of Pablo Podestá
- 1919: Teatro Nuevo, a performance in honor of José Antonio Saldías
- 1920: Teatro Nacional, a performance celebration of the Cronistas de Turf's annual party
- 1923: Teatro Florida –Galería Güemes-, a performance was in honor of and for the benefit of Carmelita Delgado
- 1923: Teatro Florida –Galería Güemes-, Zazá's debut with the Gardel-Razzano duo
