= Jacinto Valledor =

Spanish composer

Jacinto Valledor y la Calle (Madrid, 1744-Cuenca, 1809) was a Spanish composer of theatre music and tonadillas. Early success in Barcelona in the 1780s turned to difficulties after a move to Madrid where he was in the shadow of Pablo Esteve. 25 of his tonadillas survive.
