= Antonio Guerrero =

Antonio Guerrero (10 May 1709, Talavera de la Reina – 17 January 1776, Madrid) was a Spanish composer and guitarist. He was an important early creator of the tonadilla, and had an instrumental role in the development of that genre within Spanish musical theatre. He wrote ten tonadillas between 1754 and 1764. He also composed 69 sainete, a type of Spanish comic opera, between 1753 and 1765.
