= Málaga Cathedral =

Cathedral of Málaga
- Santa Iglesia Catedral Basílica de la Encarnación
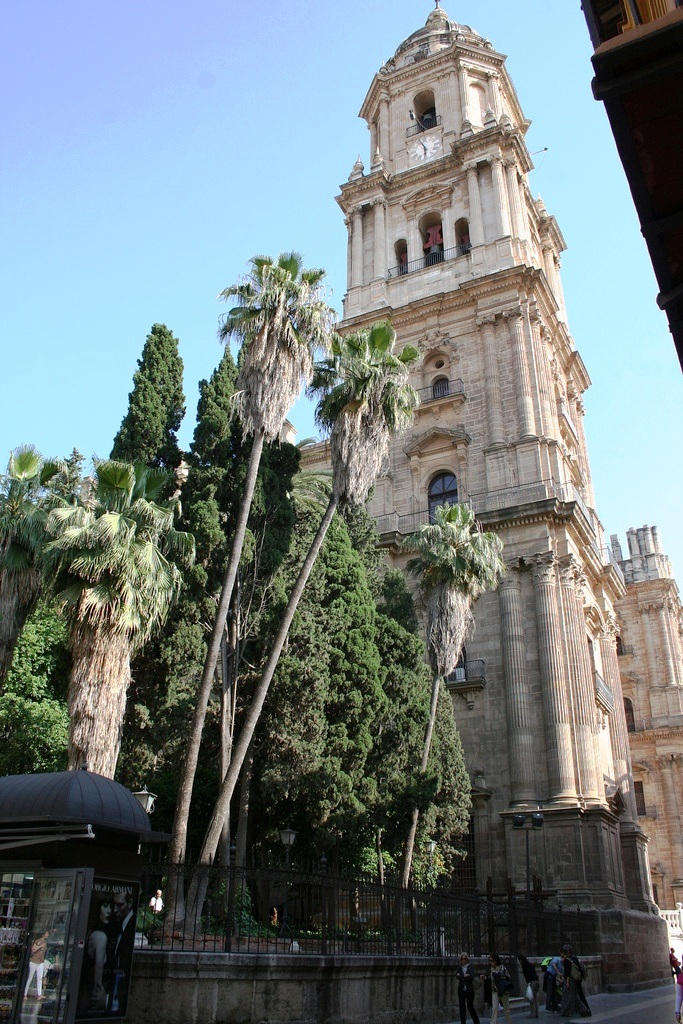
- Cathedral of Málaga
- 36.720042°N 4.42012°W
- Location: Málaga
- Country: Spain
- Denomination: Roman Catholic
- Website: malagacatedral.com

Architecture
- Architectural type: Church
- Groundbreaking: 1528
- Completed: 1782

Specifications
- Height: 84 metres (276 ft)

The Cathedral of Málaga is a Roman Catholic church in the city of Málaga in Andalusia in southern Spain. It is in the Renaissance architectural tradition. The cathedral is located within the limits defined by a now missing portion of the medieval Moorish walls, the remains of which surround the nearby Alcazaba and the Castle of Gibralfaro. It was constructed between 1528 and 1782, following the plans drawn by Diego de Siloe; its interior is also in Renaissance style.

== Description and history ==
The cathedral, built on a rectangular plan, is composed of a nave and two aisles, the former being wider, though having the same height as the aisles. The façade, unlike the rest of the building, is in Baroque style and is divided into two levels; on the lower level are three arches, inside of which are portals separated by marble columns. Above the doors are medallions carved in stone; those of the lateral doors represent the patron saints of Málaga, Saint Cyriacus and Saint Paula, while that over the centre represents the Annunciation.

The north tower is 84 metres (276 ft) high, making this building the second-highest cathedral in Andalusia, after the Giralda of Seville. The south tower remains unfinished due to lack of funds.

To defray the enormous expenses of the work, the Crown, after the War of Succession, imposed an excise duty or tax on the ships that called in Málaga, demanding an amount for each arroba of weight that they embarked. In this way, throughout the entire 18th century and especially since 1776, when trade with America began to be liberated thanks to the work of the Unzaga, Gálvez and Molina families, the work progressed rapidly. At the end of the century the budgets to finish the work ran out as they were assigned by the king Carlos III through the brothers Ortega Monroy, canon and gentleman of His Majesty, and the rationer canon Tomás de Unzaga Amézaga to his brother the governor of Louisiana Luis de Unzaga y Amézaga brother-in-law of Bernardo de Gálvez to be sent as aid to the Americans who had risen against England to achieve their independence. The rest of the budget for port taxes was used to rehabilitate the roads of Vélez-Málaga, Antequera, bring water to Málaga through the aqueduct of San Telmo, the beginning of the road to Colmenar and Mount Pío of the 'Fellowship of Vinneros', mainly for widows, orphans of the militias that participated in the American Revolution.

A plaque at the base of the tower states that funds raised by the parish to finish it were used instead to help those British colonies which became the United States to gain their independence from Great Britain. Examinations of the parish registers indicate, however, that the money may have been used instead to renovate the roadway called the "Way of Antequera" (which began in the present street Calle Martinez Maldonado). This unfinished state has led to the cathedral being called "La Manquita", meaning in English, "The One-Armed Lady".

A series of grand artworks fills the sanctuary, among them are the Gothic altarpiece of the Chapel of Santa Barbara and the 16th century tombs of the Chapel of San Francisco. The Chapel of the Incarnation contains a neoclassic altarpiece (1785) designed by the sculptor Juan de Villanueva and carved by Antonio Ramos and Aldehuela, a group of figures representing the Annunciation and sculptures of the patron saints of Málaga, Saint Ciriaco and Saint Paula, carved by Juan Salazar Palomino also in the 18th century, and The Beheading of Saint Paul, painted by Enrique Simonet in 1887 during his stay in Rome.

In 2023, restoration works were undertaken to the Cathedral crypt, including tombs of the Count and Countess of Buenavista and the count and countess of Villalcazar de Sirga.

== Gallery ==
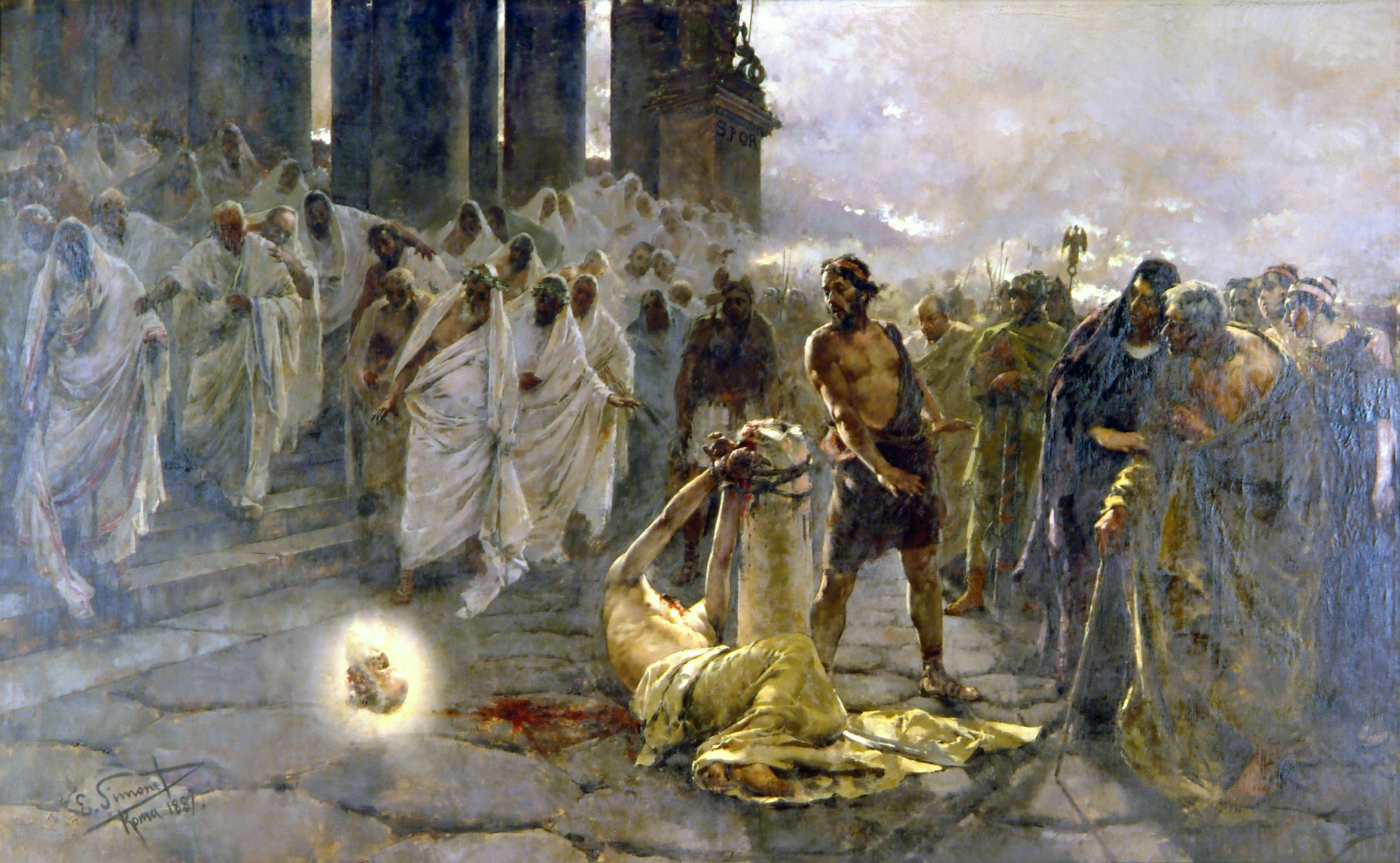
The Beheading of Saint Paul, painted by Enrique Simonet in 1887

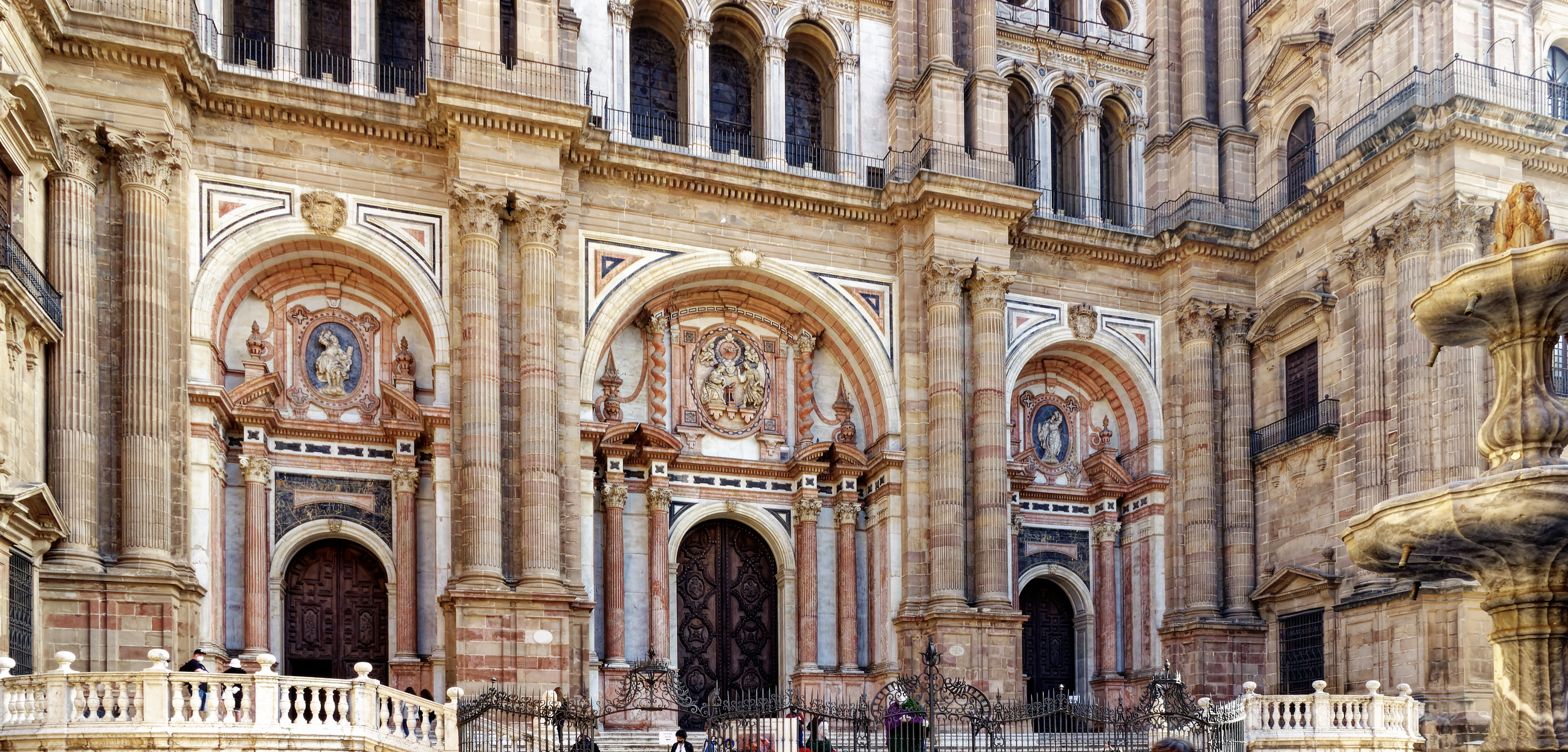
The portals

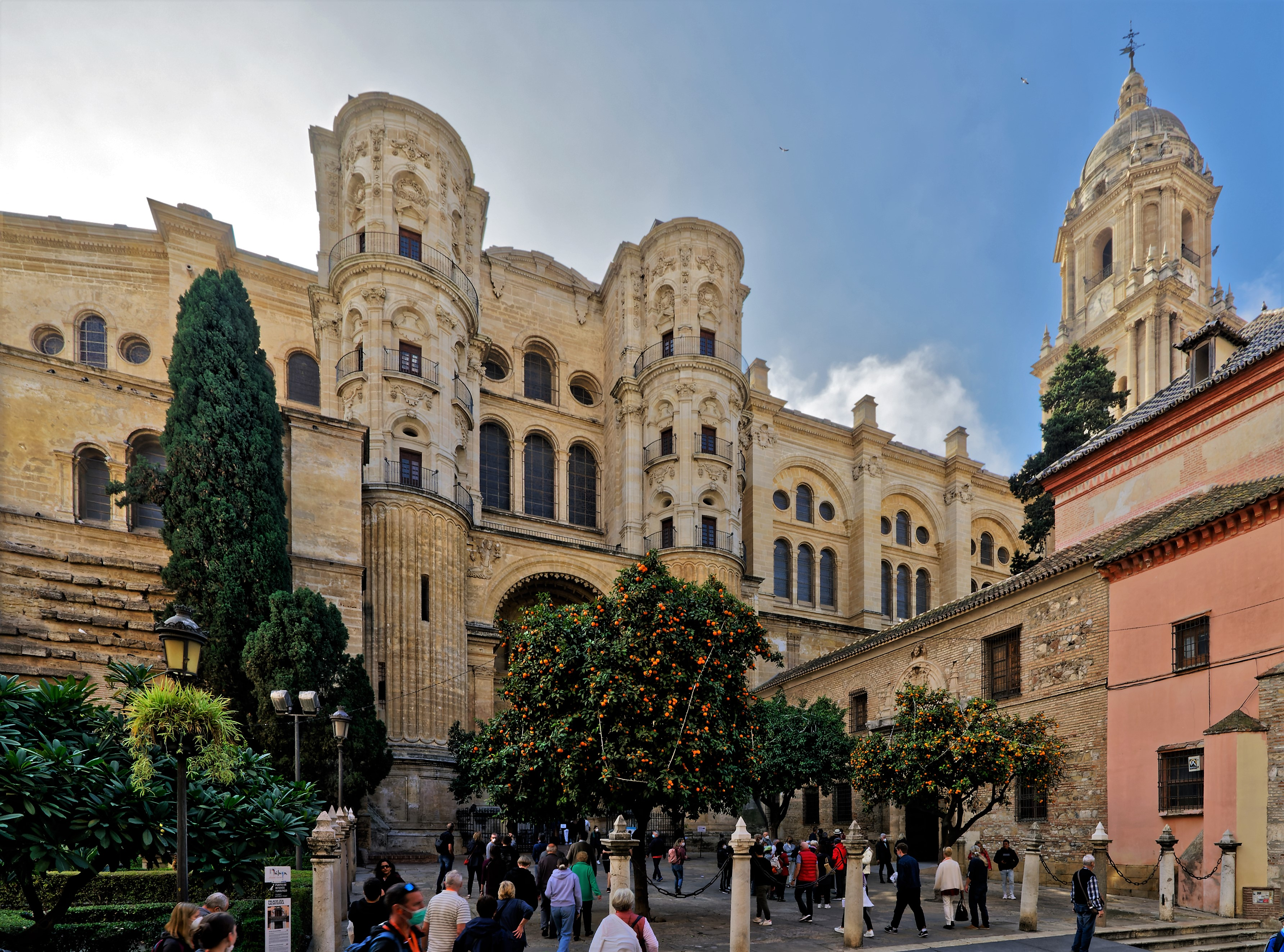
Side view

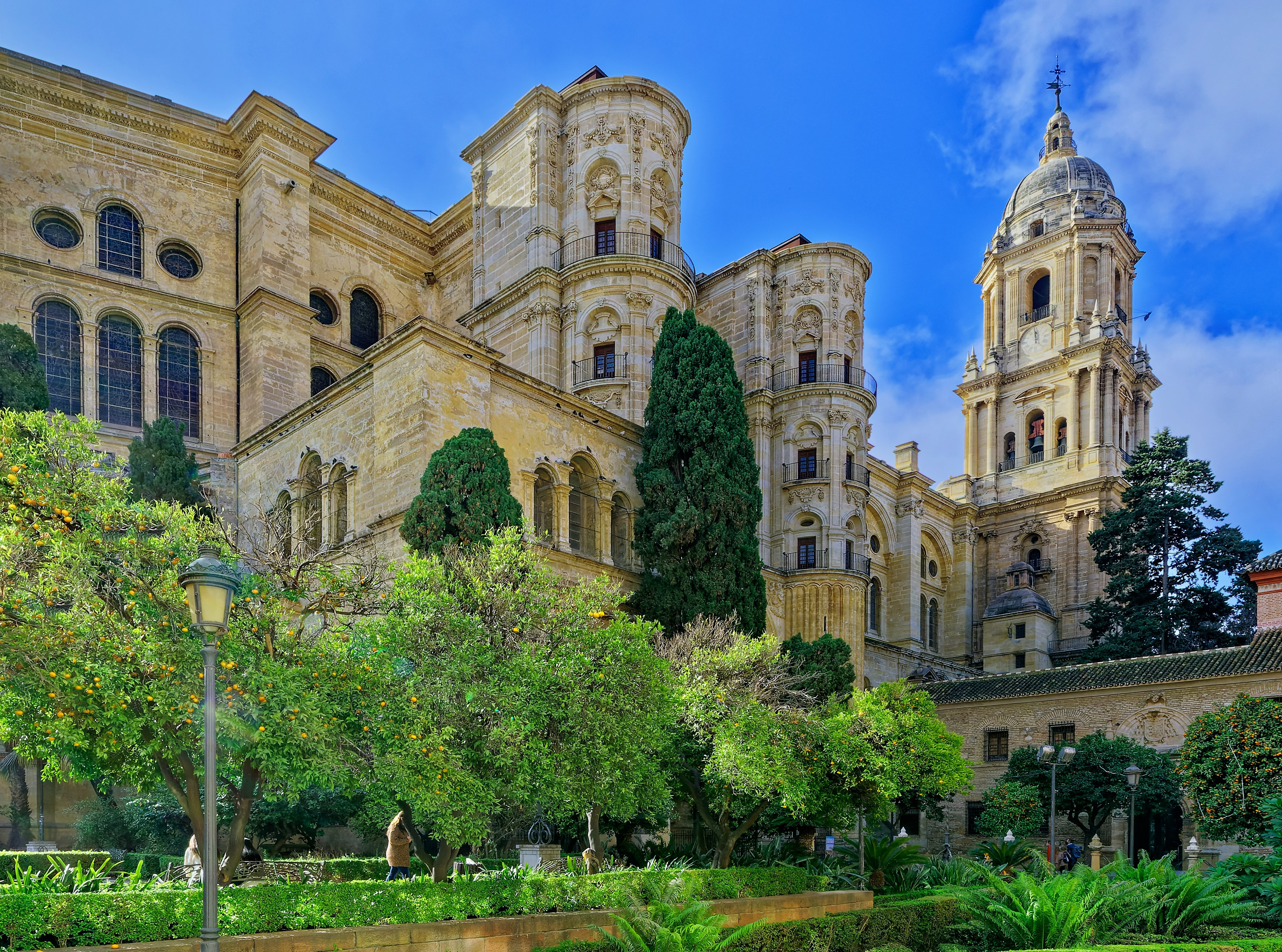
It took years for construction of Malaga Cathedral to be completed.

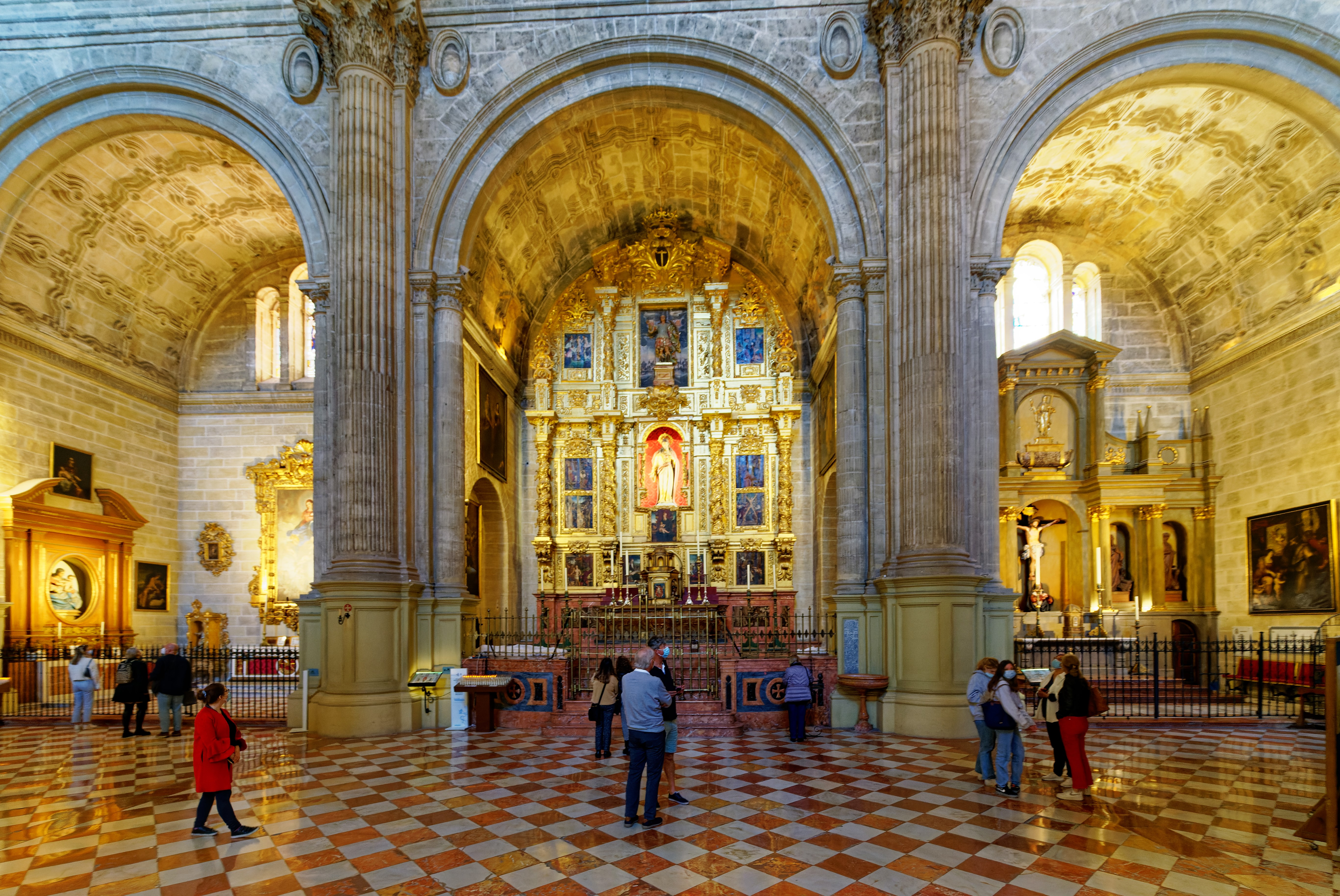
Side chapels

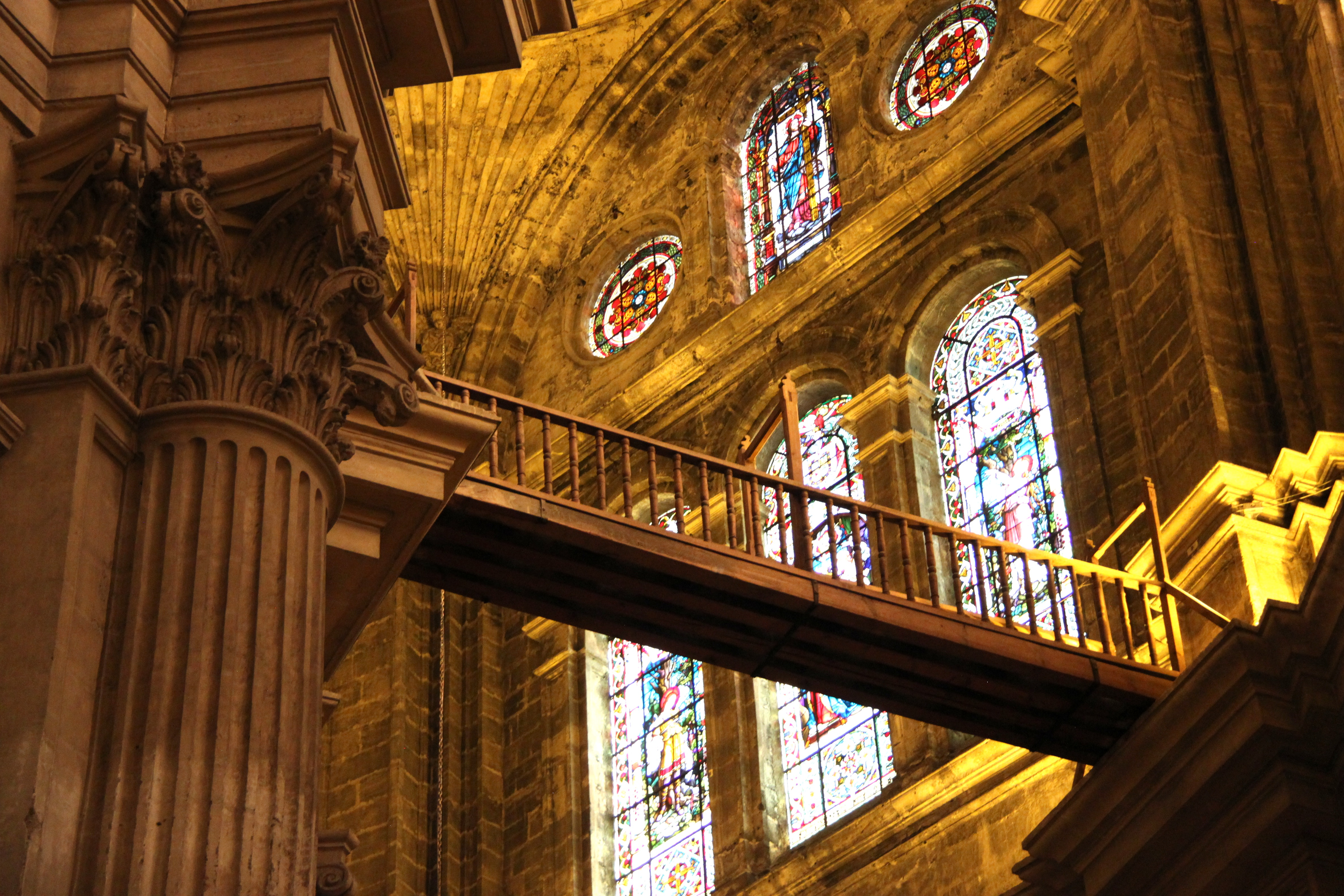

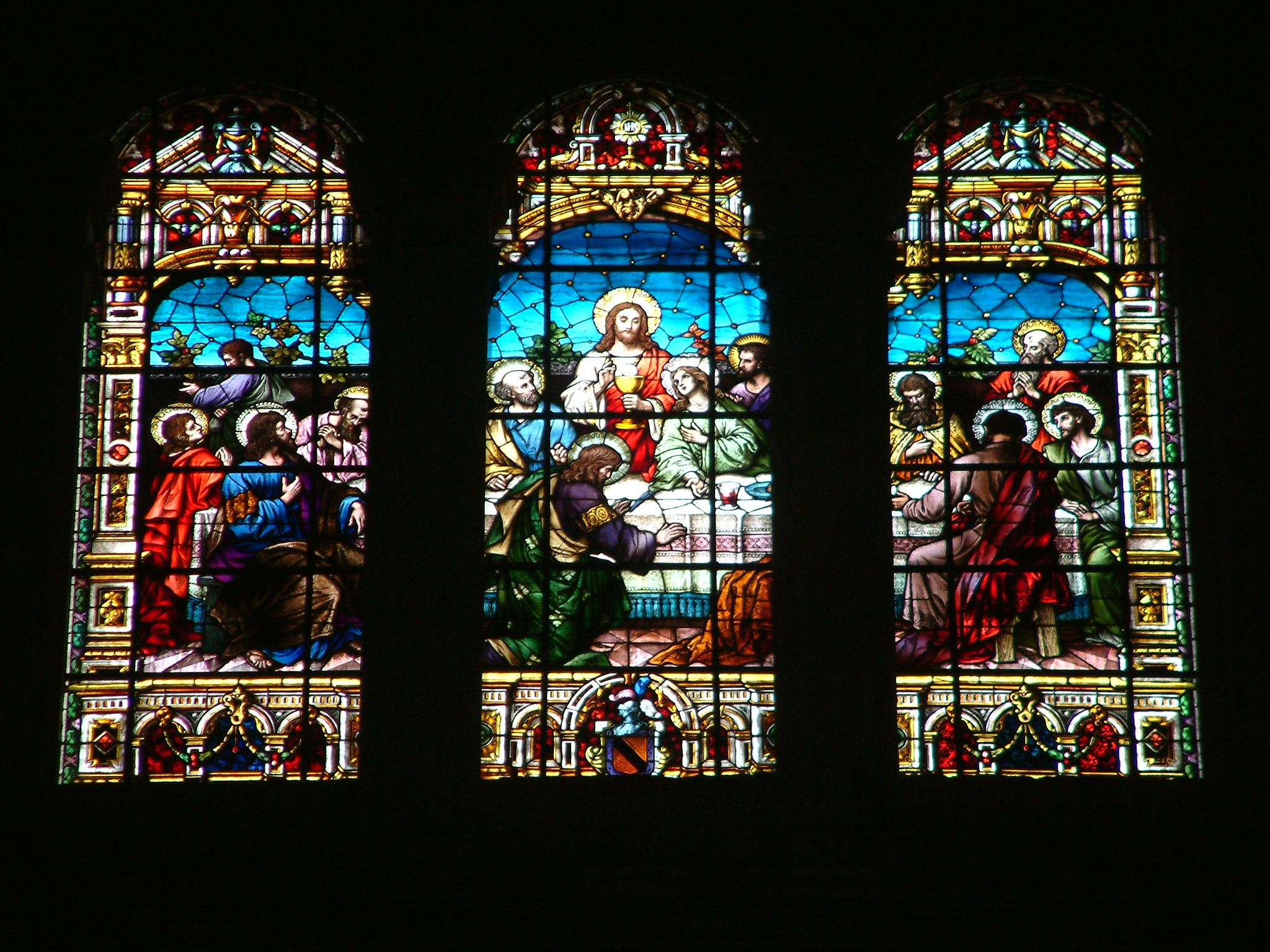

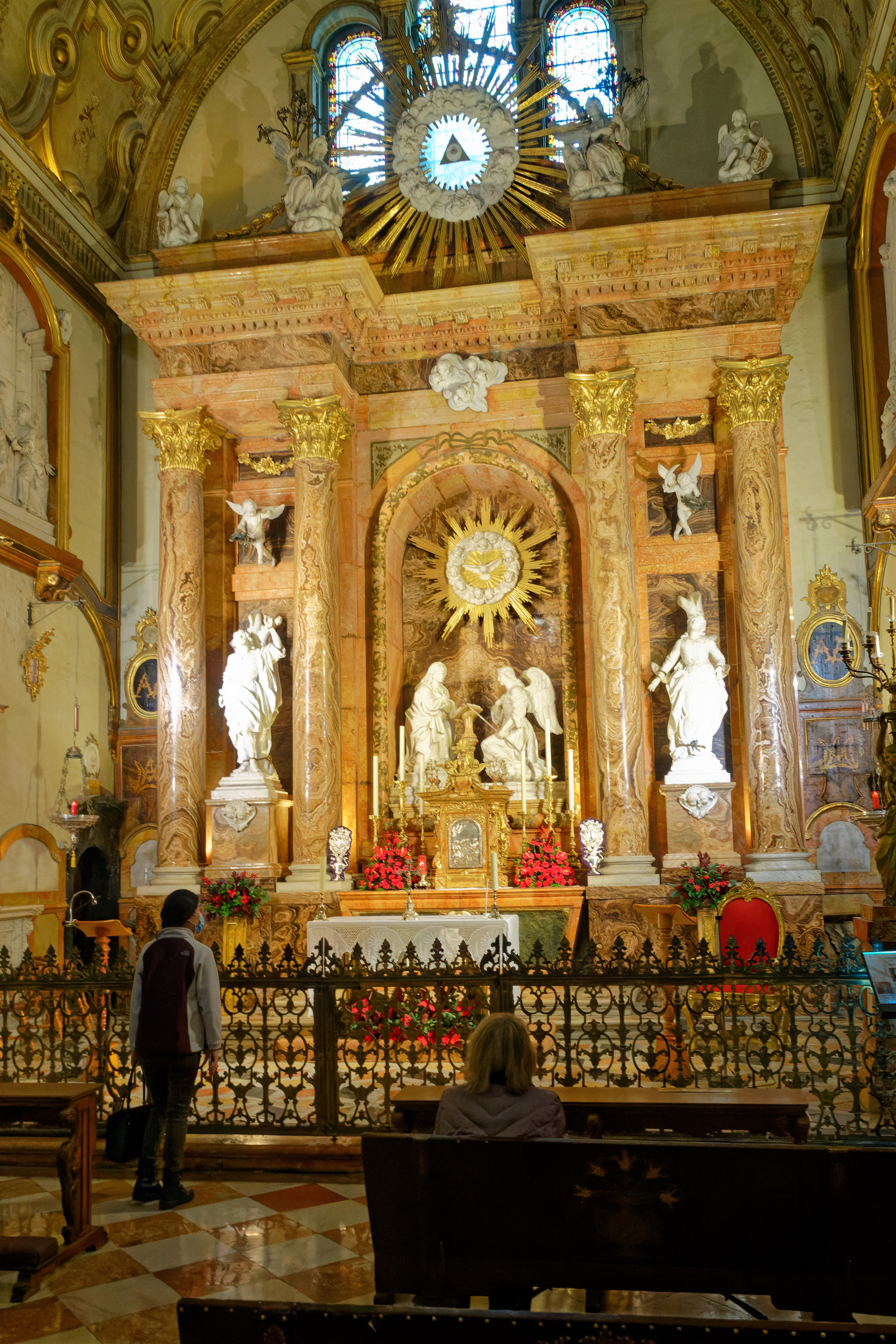
Chapel of the Incarnation

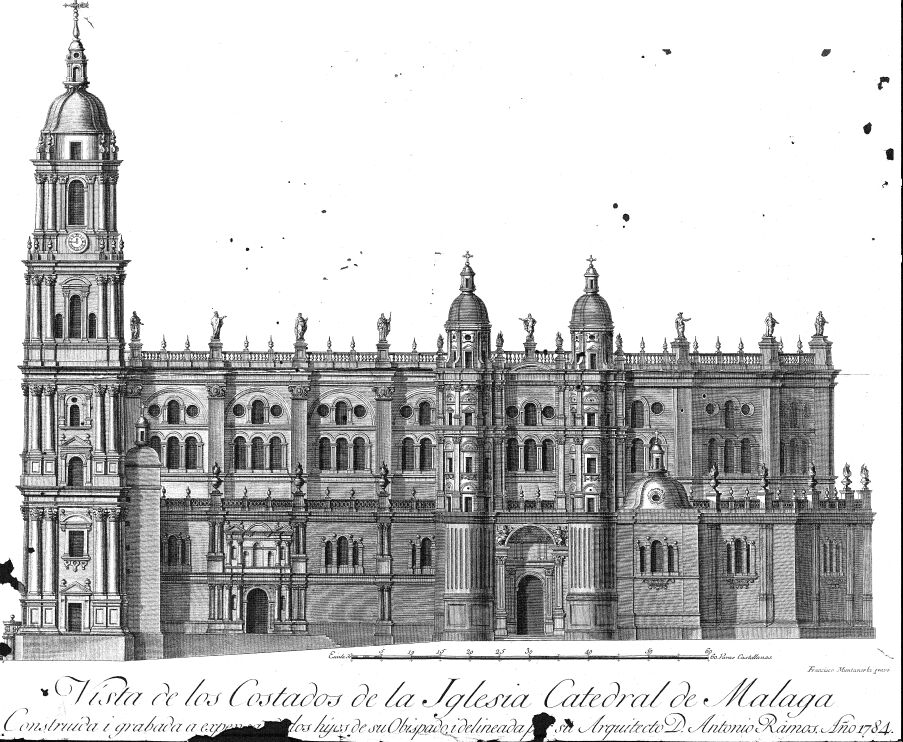
Lateral view of Málaga Cathedral in the 18th century

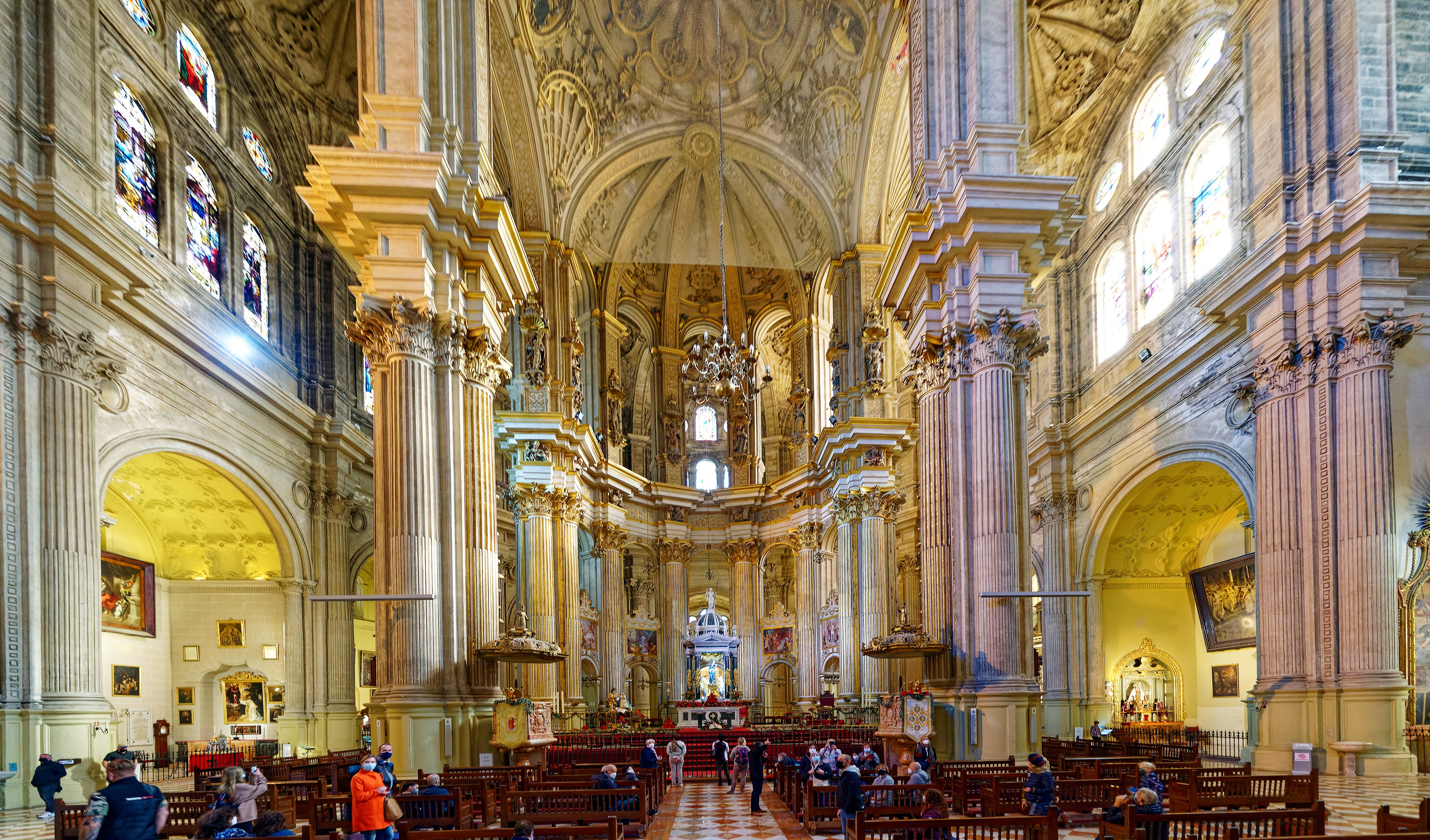
Interior of the cathedral

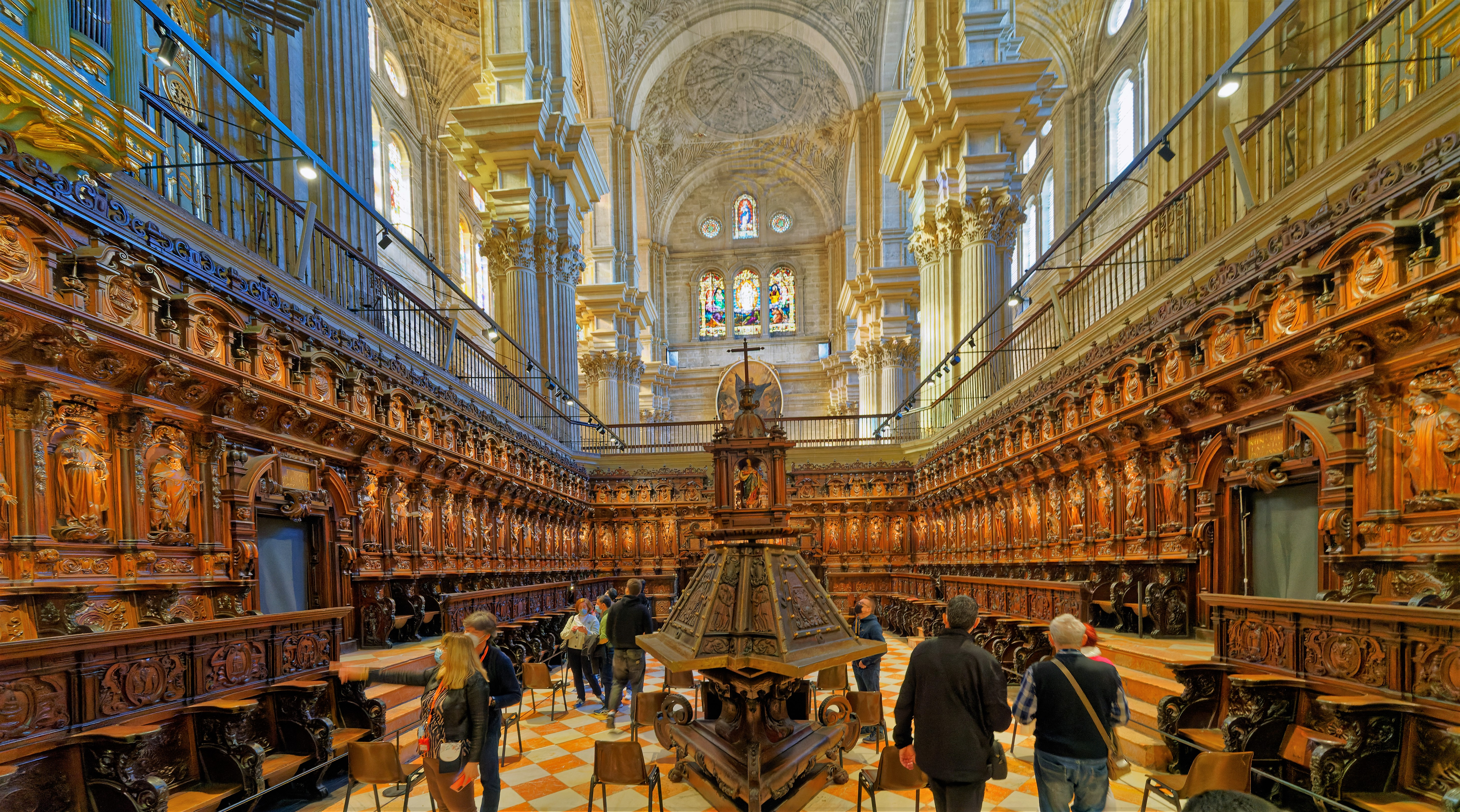
The choir stalls with a glimpse of the organs. The stalls are the work of Pedro de Mena.

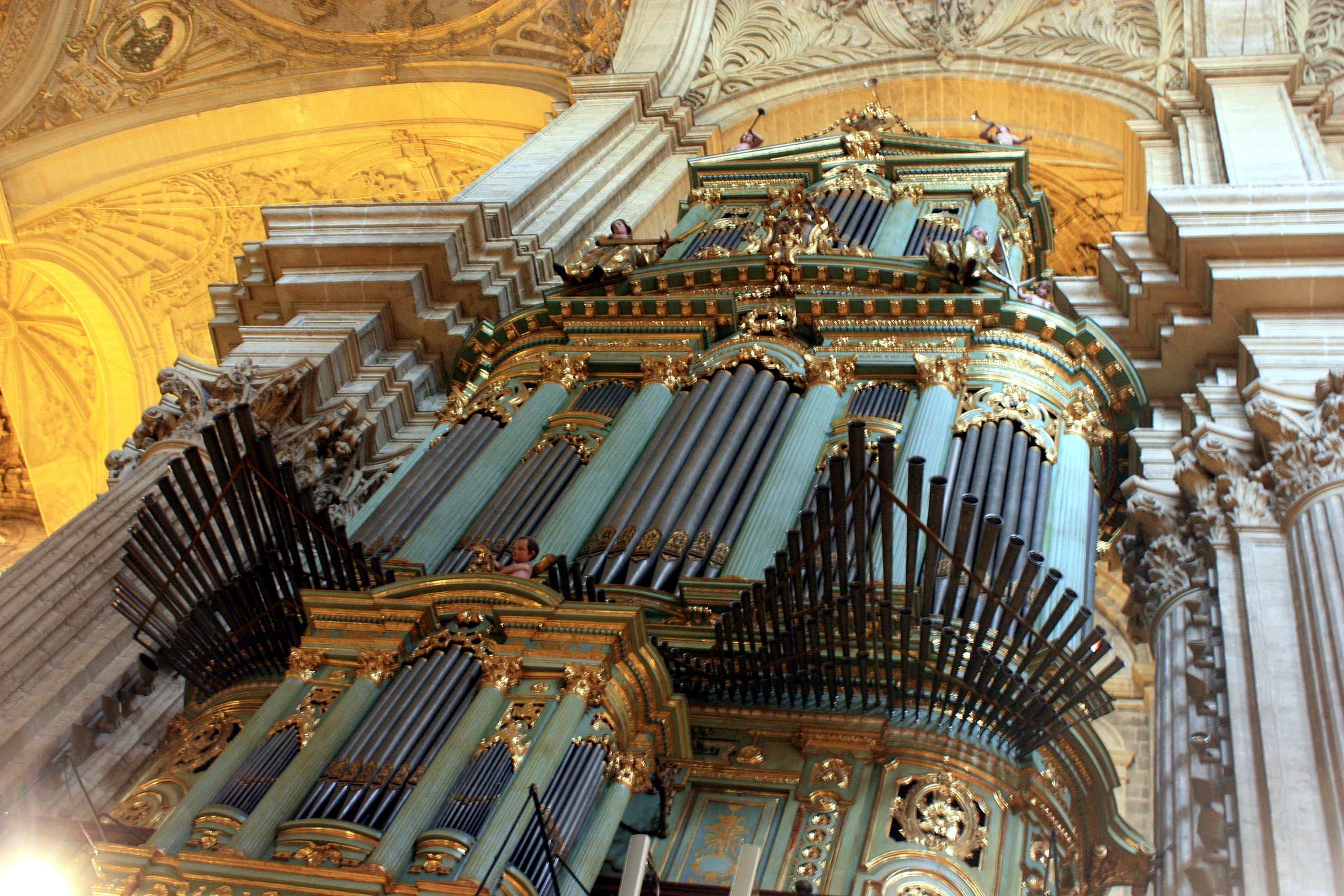
One of the organs with its prominent trompetería

== Music in the cathedral ==
Like Granada Cathedral, there is a pair of 18th-century organs. The organs of Malaga with their eye-catching trompetería (horizontal pipes) are more imposing.

Notable maestros de capilla of the cathedral include the composers Cristóbal de Morales in his last years (1551–1554), Esteban de Brito (Estêvão de Brito), Francisco Sanz, and (following the sudden death of Manuel Martínez Delgado who died before he could take the position) late baroque composers Juan Francés de Iribarren and Jayme Torrens.

== Sources ==
- EISMAN, E. L.: "Traducción de una bula de la catedral de Málaga", Jábega, nº 41, Diputación Provincial de Málaga, 1983, pp. 17–21.
- GONZÁLEZ SÁNCHEZ, V.: Catálogo general de la documentación del Archivo Histórico de la Iglesia Catedral de Málaga. Málaga: Edinford, 1994.
- RIESCO TERRERO, Á.: "El Archivo Catedral de Málaga: hacia una nueva reorganización y catalogación de fondos", Baetica: Estudios de arte, geografía e historia, nº 9, Universidad de Málaga, 1985, pp. 269–286.
- RIESCO TERRERO, Á.: "Colaboración del Obispo y Cabildo Catedral de Málaga a la empresa real de selección y edición de obras de San Isidoro de Sevilla (Edic. Regia 1597–99) y al enriquecimiento de dos grandes centros documentales: El Archivo General de Simancas y a la Biblioteca de El Escorial", Baetica, nº 11, Universidad de Málaga, 1988, pp. 301–322.
- Esteve Vaquer, Josep-Joaquim; Menzel Sansó, Cristina (2002). "Iconografía musical de los siglos XIV y XV en la catedral de Mallorca". Music in Art: International Journal for Music Iconography. 27 (1–2): 69–79. ISSN 1522-7464.
- SÁNCHEZ MAIRENA, A.: "El Archivo de la Catedral de Málaga: su primera organización a partir del inventario de 1523", E-Spania: Revue électronique d'études hispaniques médiévales, ISSN 1951-6169, nº 4, 2007.
- SÁNCHEZ MAIRENA, A.: "Notas sobre el Archivo de la Catedral de Málaga en el siglo XVI" en M.ª Val González de la Peña (ed.), Estudios en memoria del profesor Dr. Carlos Sáez: Homenaje. Madrid: Universidad de Alcalá de Henares, 2007; pp. 621–650.
- VEGA GARCÍA-FERRER, M.ª J.: "Los cantorales de gregoriano en la catedral de Málaga", F. J. Giménez Rodríguez et alii (coord.), El patrimonio musical de Andalucía y sus relaciones con el contexto ibérico. Granada: Universidad de Granada, 2008; pp. 111–126.
