= Lázaro Núñez-Robres =

Spanish zarzuela and song composer

Lázaro Núñez-Robres (Almansa 1 June 1827-after 1883) was a Spanish zarzuela and song composer.
