= Tonadilla =

Spanish musical song

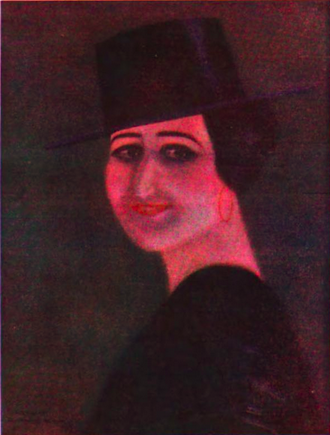
"La Tonadillera", gouache painting by Carlos Raygada.

Tonadilla, also known as tonadilla escénica, was a Spanish musical song form of theatrical origin; not danced. The genre was a type of short, satirical musical comedy popular in 18th-century Spain, and later in Cuba and other Spanish colonial countries.

It originated as a song type, then dialogue for characters was written into the tonadilla, and it expanded into a miniature opera lasting from 10 to 20 minutes. It drew its personages from everyday life and included popular and folk music and dance, and vernacular language. The tonadilla also influenced the development of the zarzuela, the characteristic form of Spanish musical drama or comedy.

The first tonadilla is ascribed to Luis Misón in 1757. Notable composers of tonadillas in Spain included Antonio Guerrero, Blas de Laserna, Pablo Esteve, and Jacinto Valledor.

The tonadilla was particularly popular in Cuba where more than 200 stage tonadillas were sung between 1790 and 1814, the year in which they began to be displaced from Havana programs, finding new life in the Cuban provinces.

In 1959, Joaquín Rodrigo wrote a short guitar duet in popular style, called Tonadilla and inspired by the theatrical form.

== Notable tonadilleras ==
- María Antinea (1915–1991), Spanish actress, vedette, dancer, cupletista and tonadillera
- Paquita Escribano (1880–1970), Spanish singer, cupletista, and tonadillera
- Perlita Greco (1906–2001), Argentine-born actress, vedette, tango singer, and cabaret singer
- Amalia Molina (1881–1956), Spanish tonadillera and dancer
- Paquita Rico, Spanish film actress and singer
- Lolita Sevilla (1935–2013), Spanish actress and singer
- Teresita Zazá (1893–1980), Spanish tonadillera, cupletista, and actress
