= Emilio Moreno =

Spanish violin and viola player and conductor

Emilio Moreno is a Spanish violin and viola player and conductor. With his brother José Miguel Moreno, a lutenist, he founded Glossa Music. He studied under Jaap Schröder at the Schola Cantorum Basiliensis. He is currently principal violist in Frans Brüggen's Orchestra of the Eighteenth Century.

Moreno is the Head of the Early Music department at the Escola Superior de Música de Catalunya, Barcelona.

== Discography ==
- 1995 - Luigi Boccherini: Los últimos tríos. La Real Cámara, Emilio Moreno (director). [Glossa, GCD 922003]
- 1996 - Música en tiempos de Goya. Marta Almajano (soprano), La Real Cámara, Emilio Moreno (director). [Glossa, GCD 920303]
- 2004 - The Spanish Album. Núria Rial, El Concierto Español, Orphenica Lyra, Emilio Moreno (director), José Miguel Moreno (director) [Glossa, GCD P10001]
- 2005 - Boccherini en Boadilla: Tríos Op. 14. La Real Cámara, Emilio Moreno (director). [Glossa, GCD 920308]
- 2008 - La tirana contra Mambrú. El Concierto Español. Emilio Moreno (director). [Glossa, GCD 920309]
- 2009 - Antonio Caldara: Il più bel nome. Raquel Andueza (soprano), María Espada (soprano), Marianne Beate Kielland (mezzosoprano), Robin Blaze (contratenor), Agustín Prunell-Friend (tenor), El Concierto Español, Emilio Moreno (director) [Glossa, GCD 920310]
