= Glossa Music =

Glossa is a classical music record label based in Spain. The label was founded in 1992 by brothers José Miguel Moreno, a lutenist, and Emilio Moreno a violinist. The label is Spain's first independent classical label.

Ediciones Singulares was a luxury imprint of Glossa with book-CD issues, in collaboration with Bru Zane.
