= Mariano Rodríguez de Ledesma =

Spanish composer

Mariano Rodríguez de Ledesma (Zaragoza, 14 December 1779 - Madrid, 28 March 1847) was a Spanish composer.

His musical training commenced when, at the age of 8 he entered the Zaragoza Cathedral choir. He was a disciple of Francisco Javier García, "el Españoleto", and was influenced by Italian music.

== Works ==
=== Songs ===
==== Spanish ====
Canción fúnebre, (s.a.,1819?), RL 30
Los cantos del trovador, (s.a., 1809?), RL 31
Delio a la ausencia de su amada Nise (s.a., 1810?), RL 32
O sí o no (s.a., 1810?), RL 33
El pescador (s.a., 1810?), RL 34
El pescador (s.a., 1814?), RL 35
La persuasión, s.a., 1831?), RL 36
El propósito inútil (s.a., 1810?), RL 37
Las señas de amor, (s.a.), RL 38
El sueño de mi amor (s.a., 1810?), RL 39
Ya tengo dueño (s.a., 1810?), RL 40

==== Italian ====
Amo te solo, te solo amai, (s.a., 1825?), RL 41
Aria e vocalizzio, (s.a., 1827?), RL 42
Il capriccio (s.a., 1815?), RL 43
Ch’io mai vi possa, (s.a., 1825?), RL 44
Clori mia bella Clori, (s.a., 1815?), RL 45
Da quel sembiante appresi, (s.a., 1825?), RL 46
Dov’e il mio bene, (s.a.,1825?), RL 47
Un fanciullin tiranno, (s.a., 1815?), RL 48
La felicità (Der Glückliche), (s.a., 1815?), RL 49
In te spero o sposo amato, (s.a., 1825?), RL 50
La nebbia, (s.a., 1815?), RL 51
Pensiero, (s.a., 1826?), RL 52
Più non si trovano fra mille amanti, (s.a., 1825?), RL 53
Se mai turbo il tuo riposo, (s.a., 1825?), RL 54
Se tenero seme, (s.a., 1815?), RL 55
Tarde s’avvede d’un tradimento, (s.a., 1825?), RL 56
Three Italian ariettas, (s.a., 1822?), RL 57
Three Italian notturnos for two voices, (s.a., 1830?), RL 58
Trova un sol mia bella Clori, (s.a., 1825?), RL 59
Vorrei di te fidarmi, (s.a., 1815?), RL 60
