= Antonio Martín y Coll =

Spanish musician of the 18th century

Antonio Martín y Coll (c. 1660 – 1734) was a Spanish composer, organist and Franciscan monk. Castilian by birth, he grew up in the monastery of San Diego in Alcalá de Henares where he became a monk and organist. He left there in 1707 to assume the post of organist at the monastery of San Francisco el Grande in Madrid; a position he maintained until his death 27 years later. He is best known for his five volume Flores de Música (Musical flowers); a large collection of keyboard music. The first four volumes contain works by other composers, but the fifth and last volume is dedicated to organ music composed by Martín y Coll.

== Biography ==
Martín y Coll was born in Reus, Catalonia in c. 1660. He became a Franciscan friar in the monastery of San Diego in Alcalá de Henares in 1690; having previously lived at that monastery from the time he was a young boy. At this monastery he was trained as an organist by Andrés Lorente; ultimately succeeded his teacher as the organist at San Diego where he served for several years. In 1707 he relocated to the monastery of San Francisco el Grande in Madrid where he served as organist until his death there in 1734.

== Works ==
Though primarily an organist, Martín y Coll also wrote a pair of treatises on liturgical practices. The first, Arte de canto llano, was published in three parts in Madrid: part 1 (1714), part 2 (1719) and part 3 (1728). The second, Breve suma de todas las reglas de canto llano y su explicación was published in Madrid in 1734.

However, his modern fame rests on the volumes of the Flores de Música (Musical flowers); a large compilation of keyboard manuscripts, nearly all of them without an author. The collection's first four volumes contain more than 1850 keyboard compositions and comprises all of the forms and types of music then known in Spain, France, and Italy. It is speculated that some of the music was taken from the Melodías músicas by his teacher Lorente which was announced for publication but of which no extant documents have been located. Modern scholarship has been able to attribute a large number of the works to composers such as Corelli, Handel, Frescobaldi, Cabanilles, and Cabezón. This included both sacred music and secular music in all of its then existing genres.

The fifth volume of the Flores de Música, called Ramillete oloroso: suabes flores de música para órgano, contains mostly organ music (as the title indicates). Unlike the earlier four volumes which contained works by other composers, the works in this fifth volume were composed by Martín y Coll; consisting of 17 canciónes, 1 sinfonía al clarín, 225 versets, a Pange lingua, and one other work. Two of these works are variations on La Folia, a long Diferencias sobre las Folías and a shorter Folías.
