= Juan Francés de Iribarren =

Spanish late baroque composer

Juan Francés de Iribarren (1699 in Sangüesa – 2 September 1767 in Málaga) was a Spanish late baroque composer.

== Life and career ==
Iribarren was christened on 24 March 1699 at the Church of St. James the Great in Sangüesa. He was a choirboy in the capilla real under José de Torres, who in 1717 recommended him for the post of organist at the Old Cathedral of Salamanca, where he remained for 16 years until 1733.

In 1733 he came second in the competition for maestro de capilla at the Cathedral of Malaga, and was awarded the position when the winner, Manuel Martinez Delgado, died suddenly. In 1741, Irribaren's salary was raised to prevent him taking the post of maestro di cappella of the Cathedral of Valladolid, thereafter he remained in Malaga until his retirement, a year before his death. He is buried in the cathedral.

== Works ==
According to the New Grove extant works include:

- 521 vocal works in Spanish:

390 villancicos, 109 cantatas, 22 arias

- 385 vocal works in Latin:

120 motets, 69 psalms, 39 antiphons, 27 masses, 26 lamentations, 25 hymns, 21 misereres, 19 magnificats, 14 sequentia, 6 responsories, 5 invitatorios, 5 nunc dimittis, 4 Oficios de difuntos, 3 lecciones, 1 Stabat Mater, 1 litany.

Published editions:

- Villancicos

== Discography ==
- 1990 – Cantatas Barrocas Españolas del siglo XVIII. Elvira Padín. Miguel Ángel Tallante. Conjunto instrumental. Ministerio de Educación y Ciencia. MEC 1017 CD. Madrid.
- 1994 – Quien Nos Dira de Una Flor. Viendo Que Jil, Hizo Raya on Barroco español. Vol.1. "Mas no puede ser". Villancicos, cantatas et al.. Al Ayre Español. Eduardo López Banzo (dir.). Deutsche harmonia mundi 05472 77325 2.
- 2005 – Villancicos y Cantadas. Sacred Songs And Dances from Latin America and Spain. El Mundo. Richard Savino. Koch International Classics 7654.
- 2007 – Iribarren: Salmos, villancicos y cantadas. Nova Lux Ensemble de la Coral de Cámara de Pamplona. RTVE música. Director: David Guindano Igarreta. RTVE Música 65274, D.L.: M – 48316 – 2006, RTVE Música, 2007.
- 2008 – Serpiente Venenosa. Música en las Catedrales de Málaga y Cádiz en el siglo XVIII. Orquesta Barroca de Sevilla y Coro Barroco de Andalucía. Diego Fasolis (director). Con María Espada (soprano), David Sagastume. Almaviva DS 0150
- 2009 – Arde el furor intrépido. Música de la catedral de Málaga en el s. XVIII. Orquesta Barroca de Sevilla. Diego Fasolis. Con María Espada y José Hernández Pastor es:José Hernández Pastor (contratenor). OBS-Prometeo OBS 01
