= José Miguel Moreno =

Spanish musician

José Miguel Moreno (Madrid, 1946, (Spanish Wikipedia says born in 1955) is a Spanish specialist of historical plucked string instruments, such as the vihuela, lute, theorbo, and guitars. In 1977 he won the First Prize of the Incontri Chitarristici di Gargnano (Italy) and later many awards for his recordings. He has undertaken recordings and live concerts with the renowned ensemble "Hesperion XX" and Jordi Savall as well as with his own formations La Romanesca and Orphenica Lyra - after the book Orphénica Lyra (1554) of Miguel de Fuenllana. He is also, with his brother violist Emilio Moreno, co-founder of the Spanish classical music label Glossa Music.
