= Pablo Esteve =

Spanish composer

Pablo Esteve y Grimau (1730–1794) was a Spanish composer. Esteve was conductor and house-composer for the Teatro de la Cruz in Madrid during the peak of the popularity of the tonadilla genre. The risque nature of the tonadilla meant that Esteve was once briefly jailed for sarcastic references to a duchess in one of his compositions. The actress who sang the tonadilla on stage escaped jail by claiming she paid no attention to what she was given to sing.
