= History of opera =

Aspect of musical history

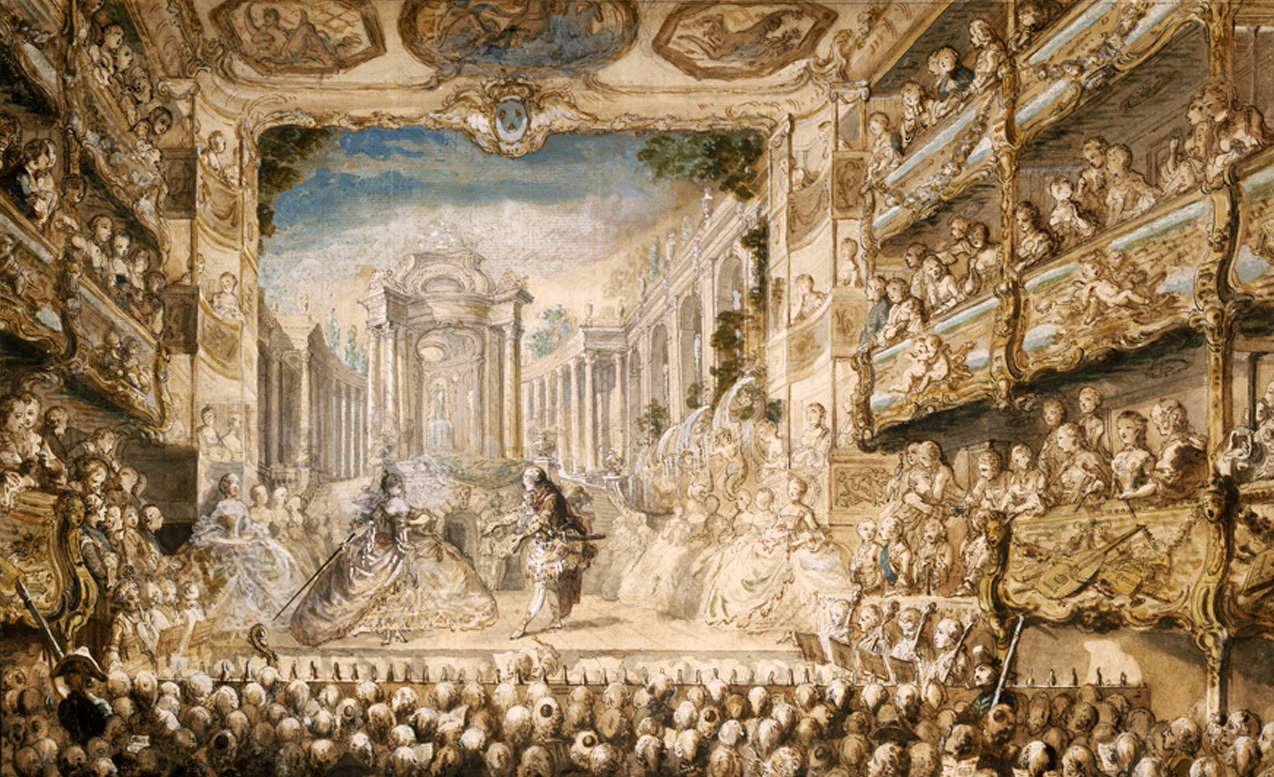
Performance of the opera Armide by Jean-Baptiste Lully at the Théâtre du Palais-Royal in Paris (1761)

The history of opera has a relatively short duration within the context of the history of music in general. It appeared in 1597, when the first opera, Dafne, by Jacopo Peri, was created. Since then it has developed parallel to the various musical currents that have followed one another over time up to the present day, generally linked to the current concept of classical music.

Opera (from the Latin opera, plural of opus, "work") is a musical genre that combines symphonic music, usually performed by an orchestra, and a written dramatic text—expressed in the form of a libretto—interpreted vocally by singers of different tessitura: tenor, baritone, and bass for the male register, and soprano, mezzo-soprano, and contralto for the female, in addition to the so-called white voices (those of children) or in falsetto (castrato, countertenor). Generally, the musical work contains overtures, interludes and musical accompaniments, while the sung part can be in choir or solo, duet, trio, or various combinations, in different structures such as recitative or aria. There are various genres, such as classical opera, chamber opera, operetta, musical, singspiel, and zarzuela. On the other hand, as in theater, there is dramatic opera (opera seria) and comic opera (opera buffa), as well as a hybrid between the two: the dramma giocoso.

As a multidisciplinary art form, opera combines music, drama, dance, scenography, costume, and makeup, relying on collaborative work between the composer, librettist, performers, conductor, and production team. Designed for live audiences, opera has historically reflected prevailing cultural, philosophical, religious, and political ideas.

Opera originated with the Florentine Camerata, a group of late 16th-century humanists who sought to revive the musical and dramatic traditions of Ancient Greek theater. This led to early works by Jacopo Peri, including Dafne (1597) and Euridice (1600), and Claudio Monteverdi's L'Orfeo (1607), which helped define the genre by introducing structured arias and instrumental sinfonias.

The genre evolved through major musical periods. The Baroque era (17th–mid-18th century) established many operatic conventions and was marked by elaborate vocal and scenic elements, accessible mainly to elites. The Classical period emphasized clarity and balance, with major contributions from Mozart and Beethoven. In the 19th century, Romanticism elevated the status of composers and vocalists, reflecting bourgeois tastes and giving rise to national operatic traditions. Later developments included French impressionism and Italian verismo. The 20th century introduced Modernist approaches and new technologies—radio, phonograph, and television—which expanded opera's reach, while earlier works remained central to the repertory.

During the course of history, within opera there have been differences of opinion as to which of its components was more important, the music or the text, or even whether the importance lay in the singing and virtuosity of the performers, a phenomenon that gave rise to bel canto and to the appearance of figures such as the diva or prima donna. From its beginnings until the consolidation of classicism, the text enjoyed greater importance, always linked to the visual spectacle, the lavish decorations and the complex baroque scenographies; Claudio Monteverdi said in this respect: "the word must be decisive, it must direct the harmony, not serve it." However, since the reform carried out by Gluck and the appearance of renowned composers such as Mozart, music as the main component of opera became more and more important. Mozart himself once commented: "poetry must be the obedient servant of music". Other authors, such as Richard Wagner, sought to bring together all the arts in a single creation, which he called "total work of art" (Gesamtkunstwerk).

== Background ==
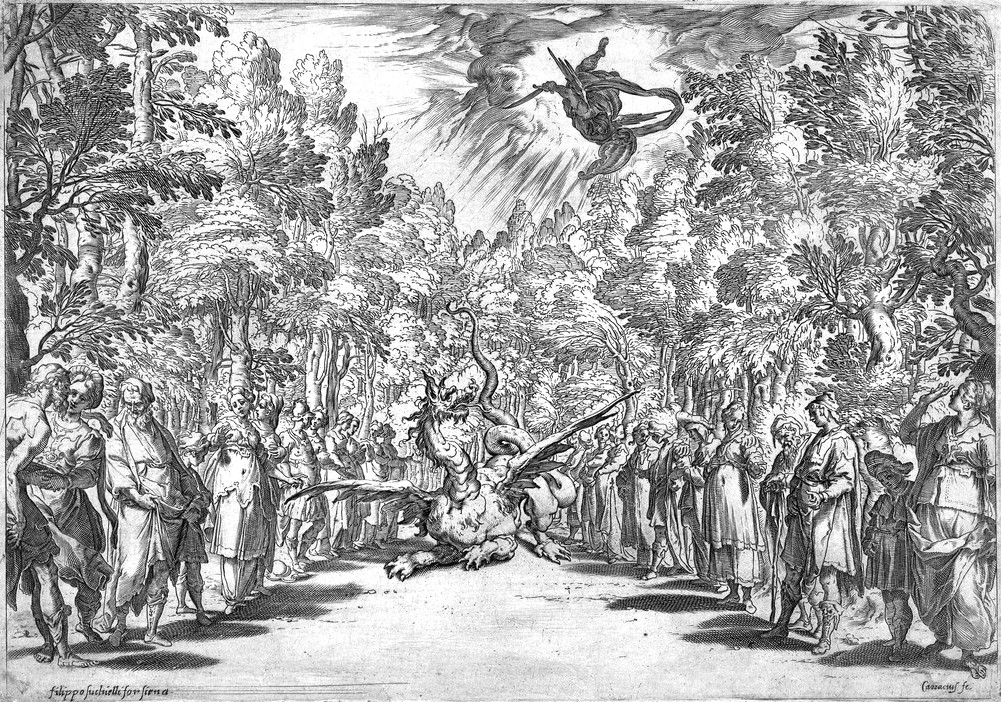
Scenario designed by Bernardo Buontalenti for the third intermedio (of six) to commemorate the wedding of Ferdinand I de Medici and Christina of Lorraine (1589). The libretto was by Ottavio Rinuccini, who reused some of the material in the first opera, Dafne, in 1597

Opera traces its origins to various forms of sung or musical theater found throughout history. Music, dance, and dramatic expression are fundamental aspects of human culture, practiced since prehistoric times. In Ancient Greece, the theater was a central cultural activity. The main dramatic genres—tragedy and comedy—emerged there, along with early developments in scenography and performance. Although little Greek music survives, historical accounts confirm that theatrical performances were sung and accompanied by music. Playwrights such as Aeschylus, Sophocles and Euripides, established dramatic principles that continue to influence theater today.

During the Middle Ages, music and drama remained closely intertwined, particularly in religious contexts. Two primary forms emerged: liturgical dramas, performed in Latin within churches; and "mystery play", presented in vernacular languages outside church settings. These works combined spoken dialogue with choral singing, instrumental accompaniment, and sometimes dance.

Outside Europe, similar traditions developed. In medieval Japan, the nō theater combined chanted narration, stylized gesture, and music, performed by a small ensemble of actors, singers, and instrumentalists. In China, Chinese opera evolved as a ritualistic, sung theater in which music served more to create atmosphere than to accompany the text directly.

During the Renaissance, several musical-vocal genres emerged, such as the madrigal, oratorio, intermedio, and ballet de cour, that laid the groundwork for opera. The intermedio (or intermezzo) was particularly influential. These musical interludes, performed between the acts of spoken plays, integrated song, dance, instrumental music, and elaborate staging, often drawing on mythological or pastoral themes. Florence, under the patronage of the Medici, became the main center of intermedio production and the birthplace of opera.

== Origins ==
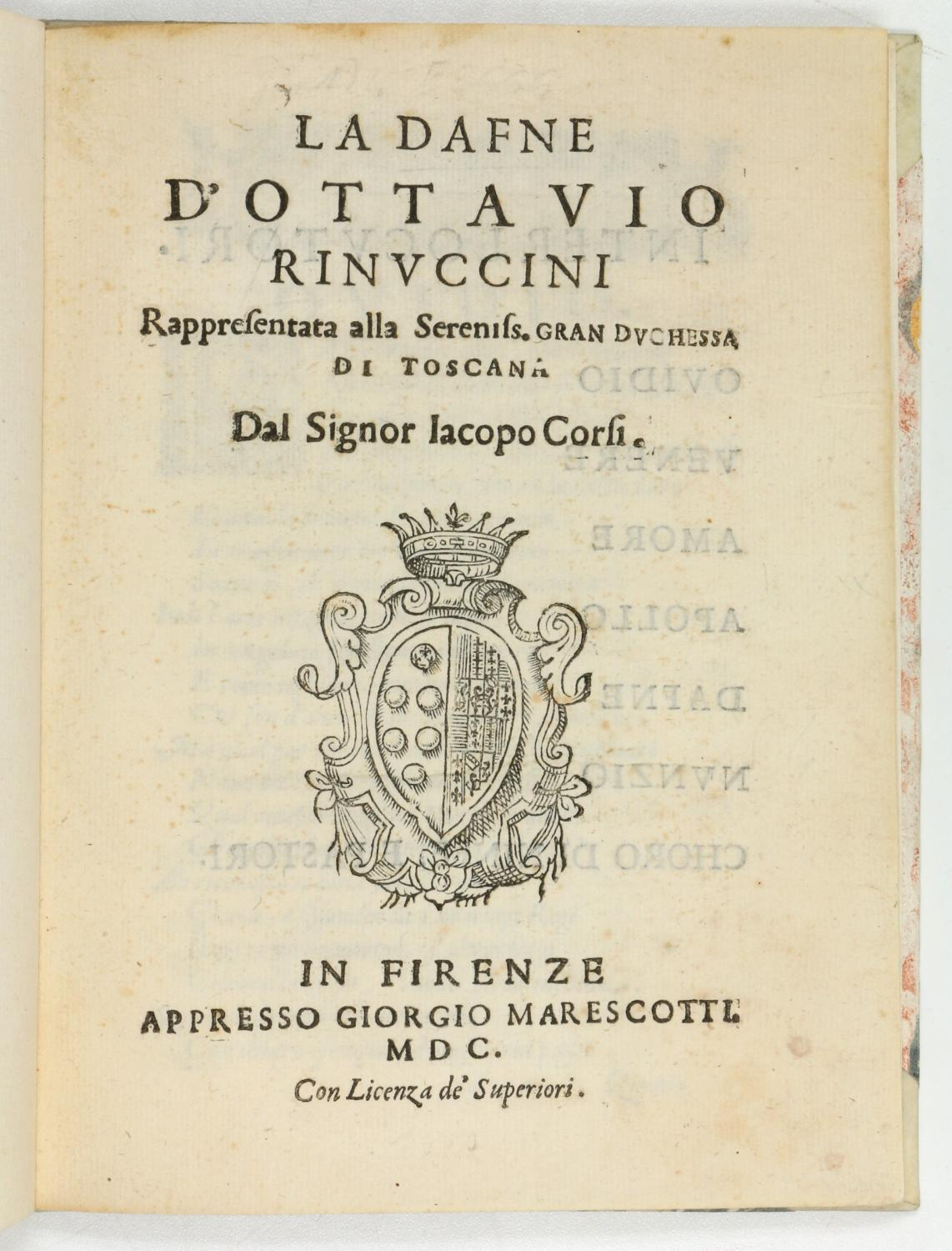
Libretto of the first opera, Dafne (1597), by Jacopo Peri and Ottavio Rinuccini

At the end of the 16th century, in Florence, a group of scholars sponsored by Count Giovanni de' Bardi created a society called Florentine Camerata, aimed to study and critical discussion of the arts, especially drama and music. Among its members was Vincenzo Galilei—father of the scientist Galileo—a celebrated Hellenist and musicologist, author of a method of tablature for lute and composer of madrigals and recitatives. In the course of their studies of Ancient Greek theater they found that in Greek theatrical performances the text was sung to individual voices. This idea struck them, since nothing like it existed at the time, at a time when almost all sung music was choral (polyphony) and, in cases of individual voices, occurred only in the religious sphere. They then had the idea of setting dramatic texts of a profane nature to music, which germinated in opera (opera in musica was the name given to it by the Camerata). (Note: Also dramma per musica Menéndez Torrellas (2013, p. 17).) Galilei was the main advocate of a single melodic line—the monody—as opposed to polyphony, which he considered to generate an incoherent musical discourse, a theory he expounded in Dialogo della musica antica et della moderna (1581). Another of the Camerata's scholars, Girolamo Mei, who was the one who mainly investigated Greek theater, pointed out the emotional affect that individual singing generated in the audience in Greek theatrical performances (De modis musicis antiquorum, 1573).

Thus, one of the members of the Camerata, the composer Jacopo Peri, created Dafne (1597), with libretto by Ottavio Rinuccini, based on the myth of Apollo and Dafne, with a prologue and six scenes; of this work only the libretto and small fragments of the music are preserved. Peri, who was also a singer, represented Apollo. This was followed, in 1600, by Euridice—by the same authors—the first surviving complete opera, on the myth of Orpheus and Eurydice. It was composed on the occasion of the wedding between Henry IV of France and Maria de Medici, celebrated in Florence in 1600. Peri played Orpheus.

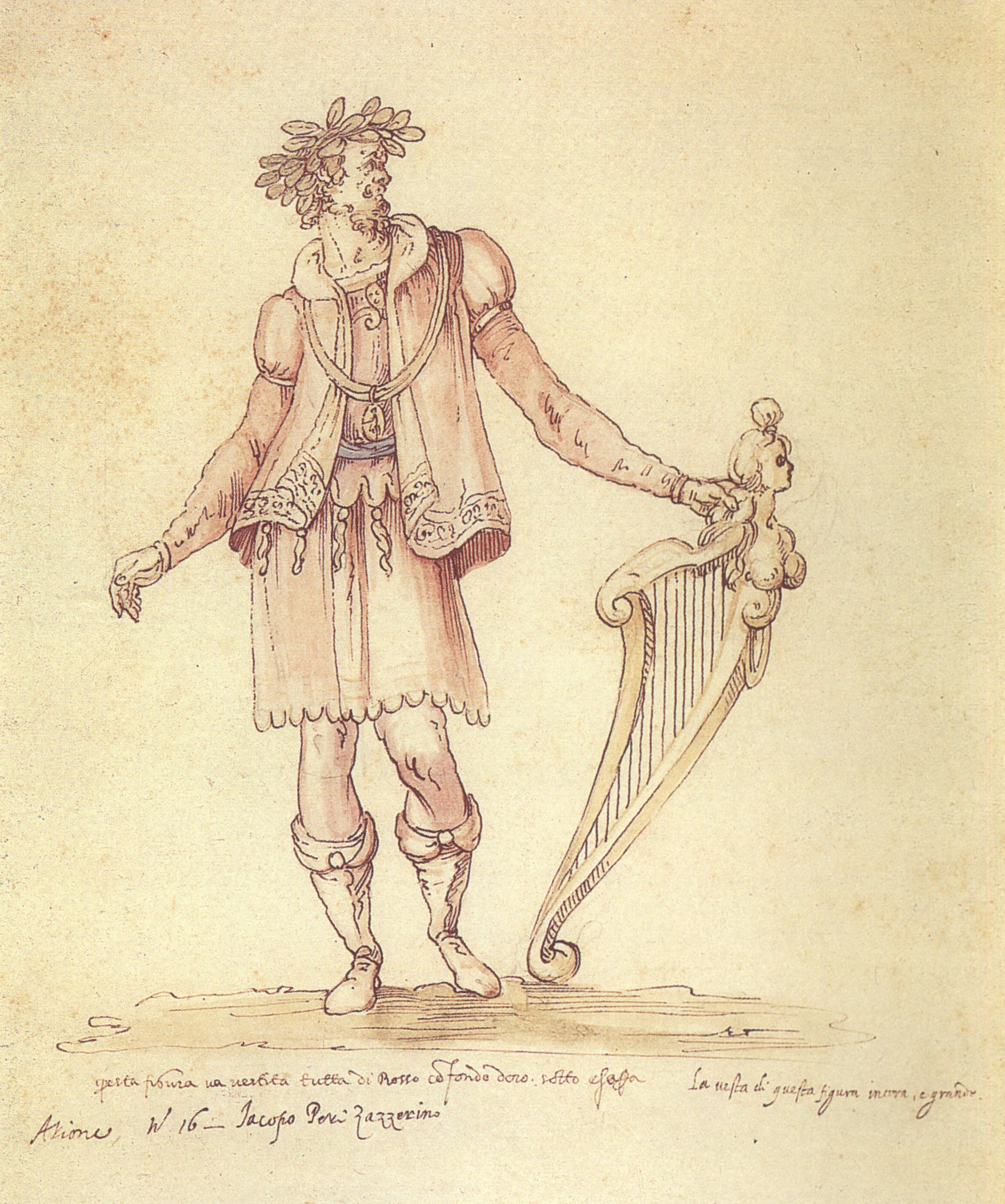
Jacopo Peri as Arione in the fifth interlude of La Pellegrina (1589)

Another member of the Camerata, Giulio Caccini, composed in 1602 Euridice, with the same libretto by Rinuccini as his namesake of two years earlier, with prologue and three acts. He was the author of the first theoretical treatise on the new genre, Le nuove musiche (1602). His daughter, Francesca Caccini, was a singer and composer, the first woman to compose an opera: La liberazione di Ruggiero dall'isola d'Alcina (1625).

One of the main novelties of this new form of artistic expression was its secularism, at a time when artistic and musical production was mostly of a religious nature. Another was the appearance of monody, the singing of a single voice, as opposed to medieval and Renaissance polyphony; it was a vocal line accompanied by a basso continuo of harpsichord or lute. (Note: The basso continuo was generally formed by a keyboard instrument (spinet, harpsichord, organ) and one or more string or wind instruments (lute, theorbo, chitarrone, viola da gamba, cello, violone, bassoon, trombone) Menéndez Torrellas (2013, p. 23).) Thus, the first operas had parts sung by soloists and parts spoken or declaimed in monody, known as stile rappresentativo.

Toccata, from La favola d'Orfeo, one of the first operas (1607), composed by Claudio Monteverdi

These first experiences were a great success, especially among the nobility: the Medici became patrons of these performances and, from Florence, they spread to the rest of Italy. The House of Gonzaga of Mantua then commissioned the famous madrigal composer Claudio Monteverdi to write an opera: La favola d'Orfeo in 1607, with libretto by Alessandro Striggio, an ambitious work composed for orchestra of forty-three instruments—including two organs with prologue and five acts. In this work, libretti were printed for the first time so that the audience could follow the performance. Monteverdi added a musical introduction which he called "symphony", and divided the sung parts into "arias", giving structure to modern opera. These arias alternated with the recitative, a musical line that included spoken and sung parts. He also introduced the ritornello, an instrumental stanza repeated between the five acts. As for the voices, although he left some parts in polyphony, he differentiated the main solo voices: Orpheus was tenor, Eurydice soprano, and Charon bass. In 1608, Monteverdi premiered L'Arianna, with libretto by Rinuccini, of which the music has not been preserved, except for one fragment: the Lamento d'Arianna.

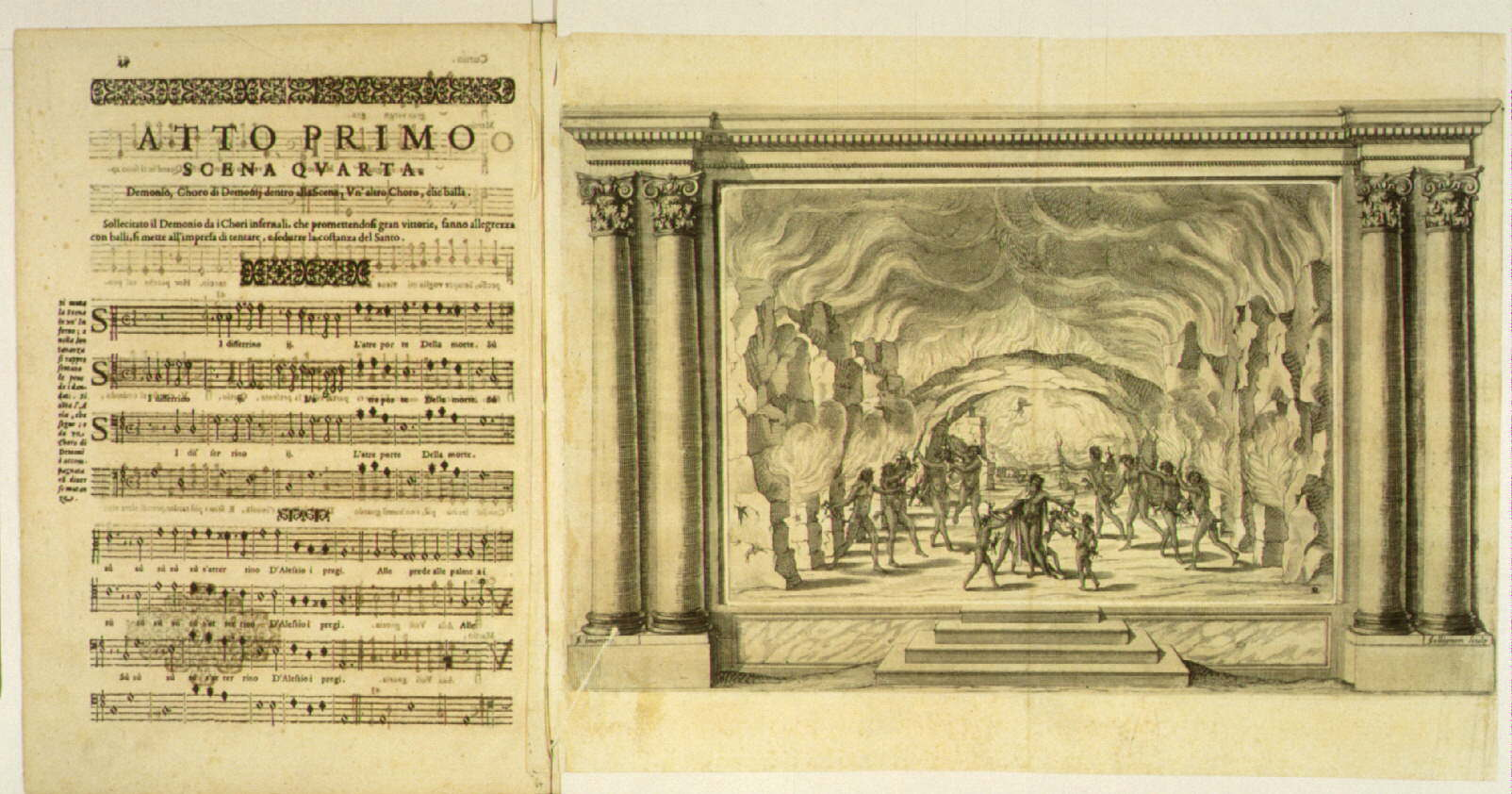
Scene from Il Sant'Alessio by Stefano Landi (1632)

During the first decades of the 17th century the opera gradually spread: in 1608 was premiered in Mantua La Dafne, again with Rinuccini's libretto, this time set to music by Marco da Gagliano. In Rome, Rappresentazione di anima e di corpo, by Emilio de' Cavalieri, a melodramma spirituale that is often considered a precedent of opera, was premiered in 1600, and which pointed out some of the variants of Roman opera as opposed to Florentine opera: greater presence of sacred themes, the presence of allegorical characters, and greater use of choirs. Pope Paul V and the Barberini family sponsored the new genre: the Barberini built an auditorium for 3000 people in their palace. They also promoted the creation of a school of operatists, among whom Stefano Landi, author of La morte d'Orfeo (1619), which as a novelty introduced comic elements. Religious themes were also introduced, as in Il Sant'Alessio (1631), by Landi, with libretto by cardinal Giulio Rospigliosi (future pope Clement IX). In this work, Landi introduced the fast-slow-fast structure—called Italian overture—which would be widely used ever since.

Another introducer of the monodic style in Rome was Paolo Quagliati, who adapted old madrigals of his in opera form: Il carro di fedeltà d'amore (1606), La sfera armoniosa (1623). In the Roman school also stood out Luigi Rossi, who worked for the Barberini. In 1642 he premiered in their theater Il palazzo incantato, a sumptuous production that was a great success. When in 1644 the Barberini had to go into exile in Paris, Rossi accompanied them, and obtained the protection of Cardinal Mazarin, thus helping to introduce opera in France. There he composed his Orfeo (1647), with prologue and three acts, a large production that featured numerous visual effects. Mention should also be made of Domenico Mazzocchi, impresario as well as composer, who initiated the hiring of singers for opera. He was the author of La catena d'Adone (1626). Another exponent was Michelangelo Rossi (Erminia sul Giordano, 1633; Andromeda, 1638).

In Rome it premiered in 1639 Chi soffre, speri, by Virgilio Mazzocchi and Marco Marazzoli, considered the first comic opera.

In these first works one of the first opera singers of recognized talent stood out vocally: Francesco Rasi, a tenor who was already famous before the rise of opera, who participated in the first performances of Peri's Euridice. In 1598 he entered the service of the Gonzaga of Mantua, for which he performed in this city Monteverdi's Orfeo in 1607; the following year he participated in Gagliano's Dafne. He was also a composer, author of Cibele ed Ati (1617), whose music has been lost.

== Baroque ==
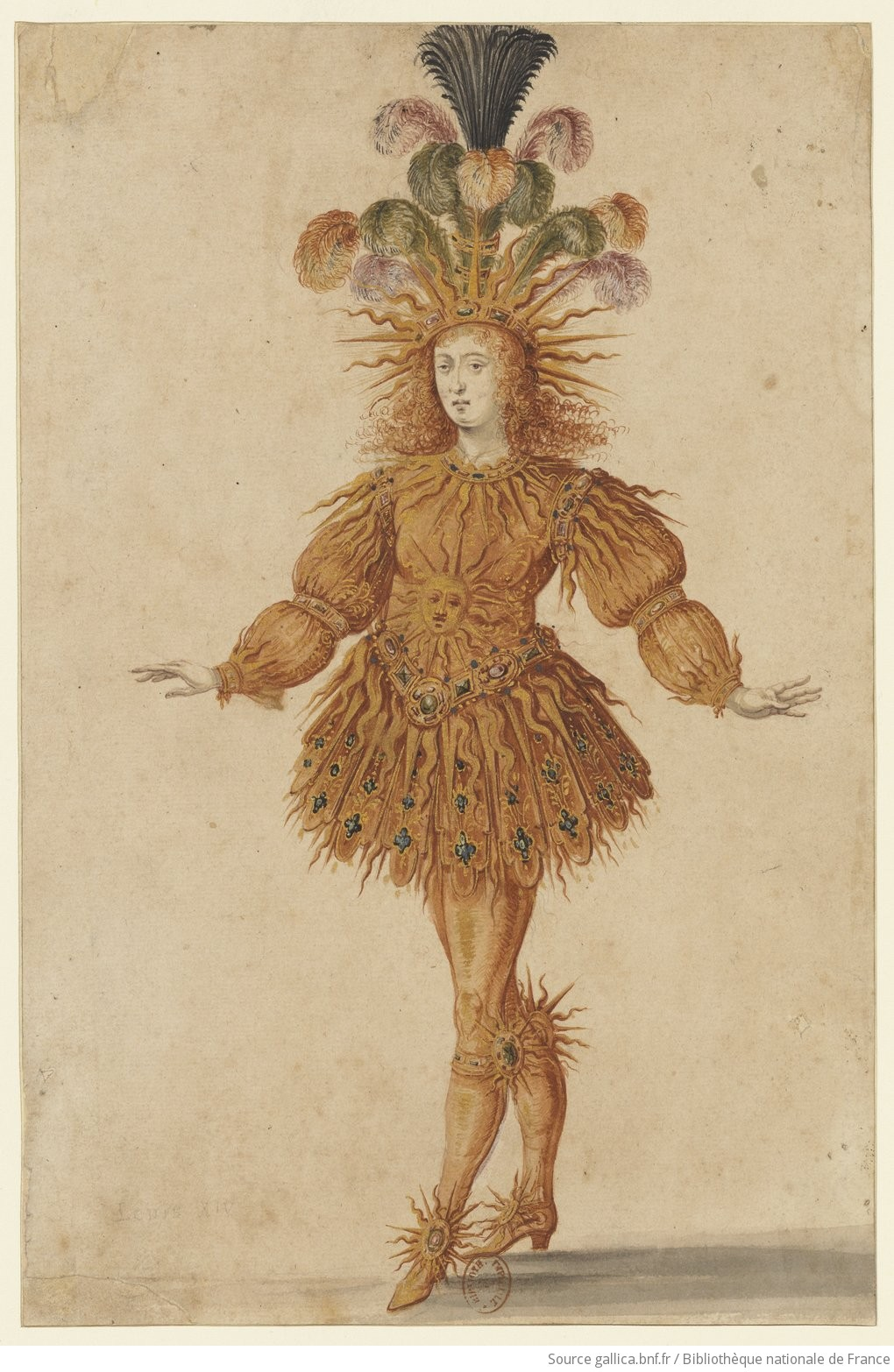
Louis XIV in Ballet Royal de la Nuit (1653)

The Baroque (Note: The term "baroque" comes from a word of Portuguese origin (barrôco), whose feminine denominated the pearls that had irregular shapes (as in Spanish the word "barruecas"). The word arose in the context of music criticism: in 1750, the French essayist Noël-Antoine Pluche compared the playing of two violinists, one more serene and the other more extravagant, commenting of the latter that "he tries at all costs to surprise, to attract attention, with unbridled and extravagant sounds. It seems but that in this way it was a matter of diving to the bottom of the seas to extract berruecos (baroc in French) with great efforts, while on land it would be possible to find with much more ease valuable jewels." Comellas (2010, p. 82)) developed during the 17th century. It was a time of great disputes in the political and religious fields, in which a division emerged between the Catholic Counter-Reformationist countries, where the absolutist state was entrenched, and the Protestant countries, of a more parliamentary sign.

Baroque music was generally characterized by contrast, violent chords, moving volumes, exaggerated ornamentation, varied and contrasted structure. Despite this, not all baroque music is exaggerated: Bach is an author of harmonic balance, and Vivaldi creates simple and radiant melodies. The basis of baroque music is serene and balanced, with ornamentation: arpeggios, mordents, tremolos, sonorous arabesques that are the salt of the baroque musician. It was also at this time that the tempos were introduced to regulate the speed of interpretation: long, adagio, andante, allegro and presto; or the intensity: forte and piano.

During this period, the main musical centers were in the monarchic courts, aristocratic circles and episcopal sees. The instrumentation reached heights of great perfection, especially in the violin The Baroque orchestra was small, usually only a chamber orchestra, or about forty instruments at most. Most were string instruments, plus some oboes, flutes, bassoons and trumpets. Alongside these was a section for basso continuo, usually composed of one or two harpsichords with accompaniment by cello, double bass, lute, viola or theorbo.

Baroque opera was noted for its complicated and ornate scenography, with sudden changes and complicated lighting and sensory effects. Numerous sets were used, up to fifteen or twenty changes of scenery per performance. There began a taste for solo voices, mainly treble (tenor, soprano), which led in parallel to the phenomenon of the castrati. The latter were children who excelled in singing and who were castrated before entering puberty so that their voice would not change; thus, as adults they maintained a high-pitched voice, close to the female one, but more powerful, flexible and penetrating. (Note: The last opera in which he sang a castrato was Il crociato in Egitto, by Giacomo Meyerbeer (1824). Its presence continued in the sphere of the Catholic Church until the beginning of the 20th century: the voice of the last castrato, Alessandro Moreschi, could be recorded on phonograph Menéndez Torrellas (2013, p. 69).) Singing in vibrato was also introduced, consisting of fluctuations in timbre, pitch and intensity, which provided greater emotionality to the interpretation.

In the first half of the 17th century, the rules of operatic librettos were established, which would undergo few variations until almost the 20th century: simple dialogues and conventional language, stanzas of rigorous forms, distinction between "recitative"—declaimed parts that develop the action—and "number" (or "closed piece")—ornamental parts in the form of aria, duet, choir, or other formats.

=== French opera ===
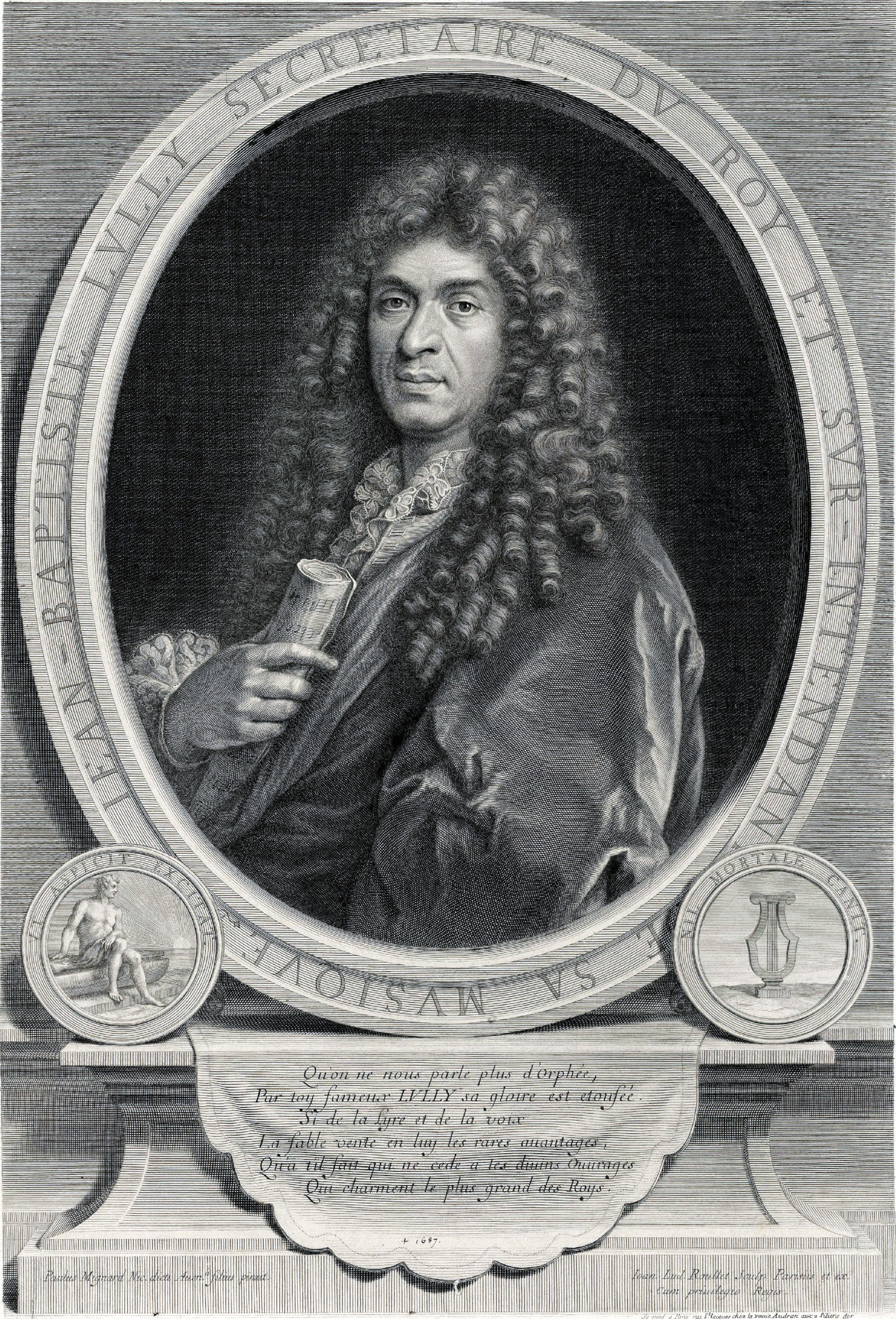
Jean-Baptiste Lully

One of the first countries where opera was introduced after Italy was France, where it was called tragédie en musique. In 1645, the first Italian opera, the pastoral La finta pazza, by Francesco Sacrati, was performed in Paris. Two years later Luigi Rossi's Orfeo was performed, which caused a great sensation. Pier Francesco Cavalli premiered his Ercole amante in Paris in 1662, at the newly opened Tuileries Palace a commission of Cardinal Mazarin for the celebration of the wedding of Louis XIV with Maria Theresa of Spain. The work was not much liked, as it was in Italian and with castrati, a strange phenomenon for the French public, more fond of ballets de cour.

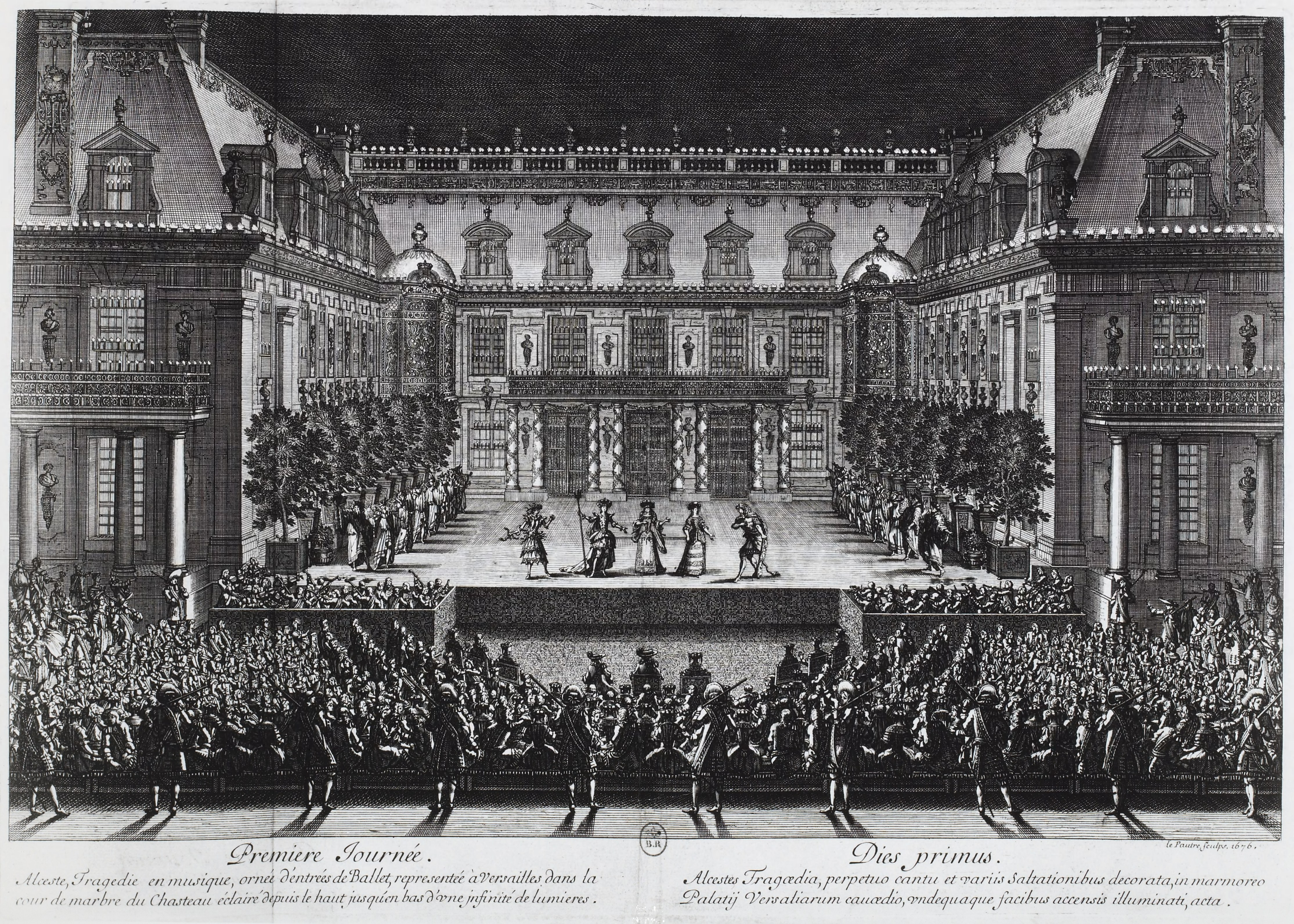
Performance of Alceste by Jean-Baptiste Lully, Jeu de Paume du Bel-Air theater, Paris, 4 July 1674.

In 1669, the poet Pierre Perrin and the composer Robert Cambert created a company to perform operas in the French taste and obtained from King Louis XIV the royal privilege to constitute an academy, the Académie Royale de Musique, located in the Jeu de Paume de la Bouteille theater. Both authors produced the opera Pomone, the first written in French, premiered in 1671. However, the following year, Perrin was imprisoned for debt and the royal privilege passed to Jean-Baptiste Lully, a composer of Florentine origin (his real name was Giovanni Battista Lulli). Lully adapted opera to French taste, with choirs, ballets, a richer orchestra, musical interludes and shorter arias. He developed French overture in a slow-fast-slow structure, unlike the Italian, which became almost autonomous pieces of the operatic ensemble. On the other hand, he used to accompany the recitative with a harpsichord continuo bass. At the same time, he gave greater prominence to the text, which provided greater expressiveness to the opera. Likewise, he adapted the singing to the prosody of the French language, creating a typically Gallic vocality called déclamation mélodique. From 1673 until 1687, the date of his death, he composed one opera per year-most with libretti by Philippe Quinault-among them: Cadmus et Hermione (1673), Alceste (1674), Atys (1676), Proserpine (1680), Persée (1682), Phaëton(1683), Amadis (1684), Armide (1686) and Acis et Galatée (1686). The most successful was Alceste, based on a tragedy by Euripides and composed to celebrate the victory of Louis XIV in the Franche-Comté, which included a minor plot with a comic air and some catchy melodies that greatly pleased the public.

Finally, from the ópera Armide (1686), by Jean-Baptiste Lully

Another exponent was Marc-Antoine Charpentier, who musicalized some plays by Molière (Le mariage forcé, 1672; Le malade imaginaire [Le malade imaginaire], 1673) and composed several plays for the Comédie-Française, such as Les amours de Vénus et d'Adonis (1678), David et Jonathas (1688) and La noce du village (1692). His masterpiece is the tragedy Médée(Medea, 1693), on a play by Pierre Corneille.

Marin Marais was a composer and performer of viola da gamba. He worked at the court of Louis XIV and was conductor of the orchestra of the Académie Royale de Musique. He composed four Lullian-style operas: Alcide (1693), Ariane et Bacchus (1695), Alcyone (1706) and Sémélé (1709).

After Lully's operas, and because of the French fondness for ballet, there arose the opera-ballet, a hybrid genre of the two, in which sung parts with music alternated with danced interludes, with generally comic and amorous themes. This genre was introduced by André Campra with L'Europe galante (1689), which was followed by numerous works by this author, most notably Les fêtes vénitiennes (1710). Campra also produced conventional operas, such as Tancrède (1702) and Idoménée (1712).

=== Venetian opera ===
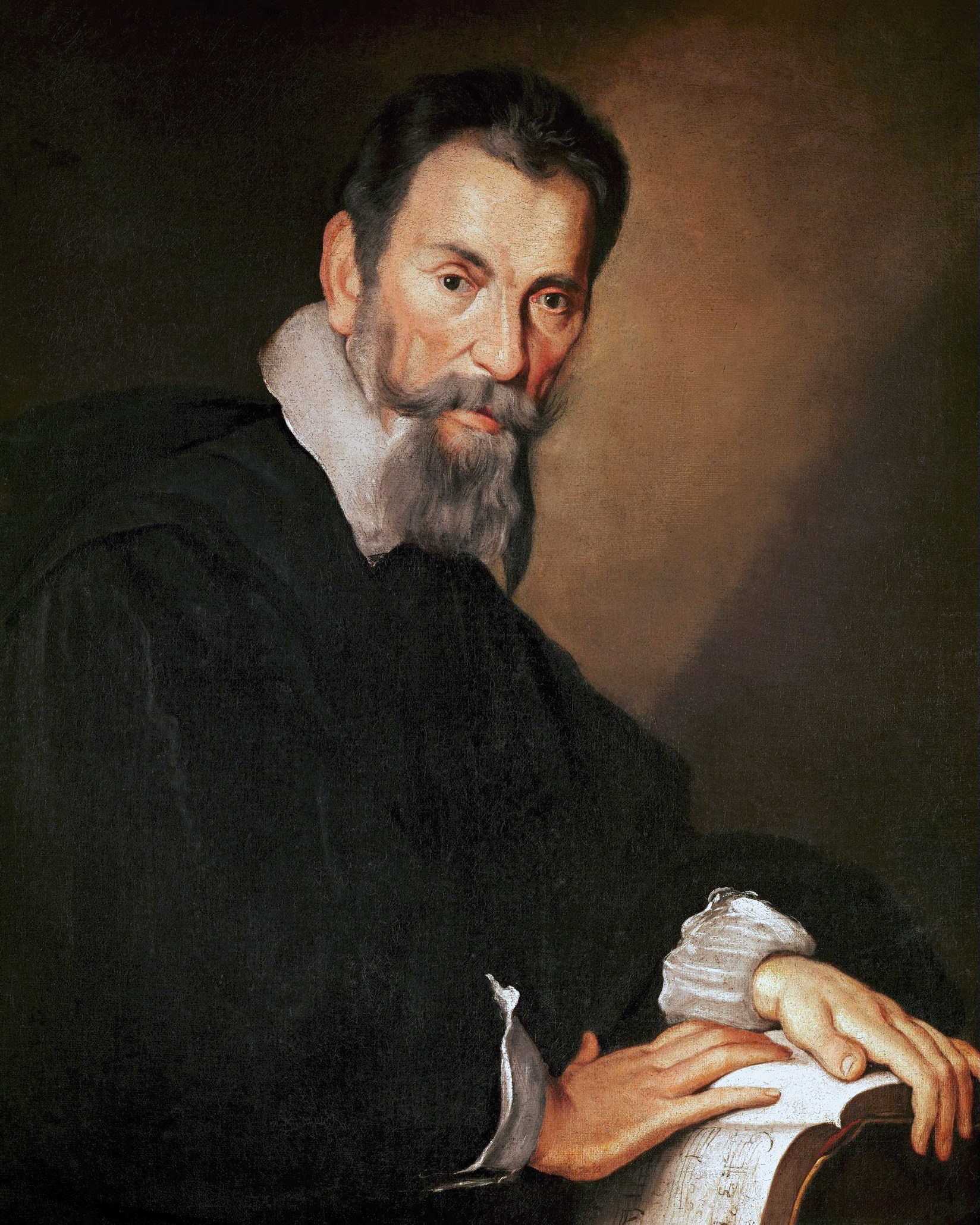
Claudio Monteverdi

In the middle decades of the 17th century the major opera-producing center was Venice, the first place where music was detached from religious or aristocratic protection to be performed in public places: in 1637 the Teatro San Cassiano was founded (demolished in 1812), the first opera center in the world, located in a palace that belonged to the Tron family. The first opera performed was L'Andromeda, by Francesco Mannelli. The theater was founded by Domenico Mazzocchi, who after losing papal favor moved from Rome to the Venetian city. As opera became a business, it began to depend more and more on the tastes of the public, since by its attendance at performances it could favor a certain compositional line or relegate it to oblivion. One of the first consequences was that the public showed more and more taste for high-pitched voices, those of tenors, sopranos and castrati, while the use of choirs and large orchestras declined, since an accompaniment of few instruments was preferred, between ten and fifteen, generally. As the genre became more popular, more comic elements were introduced and the texts were simplified, to the point where, especially in the arias, the interpretation was more important than the words that were expressed. After the San Cassiano, the opening of new theaters flourished in Venice: Santi Giovanni e Paolo (1639), San Moisè (1640), Novissimo (1641), San Samuele (1655) and Santi Apostoli (1649). It was in these theaters that the piazza-like layout surrounded by boxes, typical of opera houses, began.

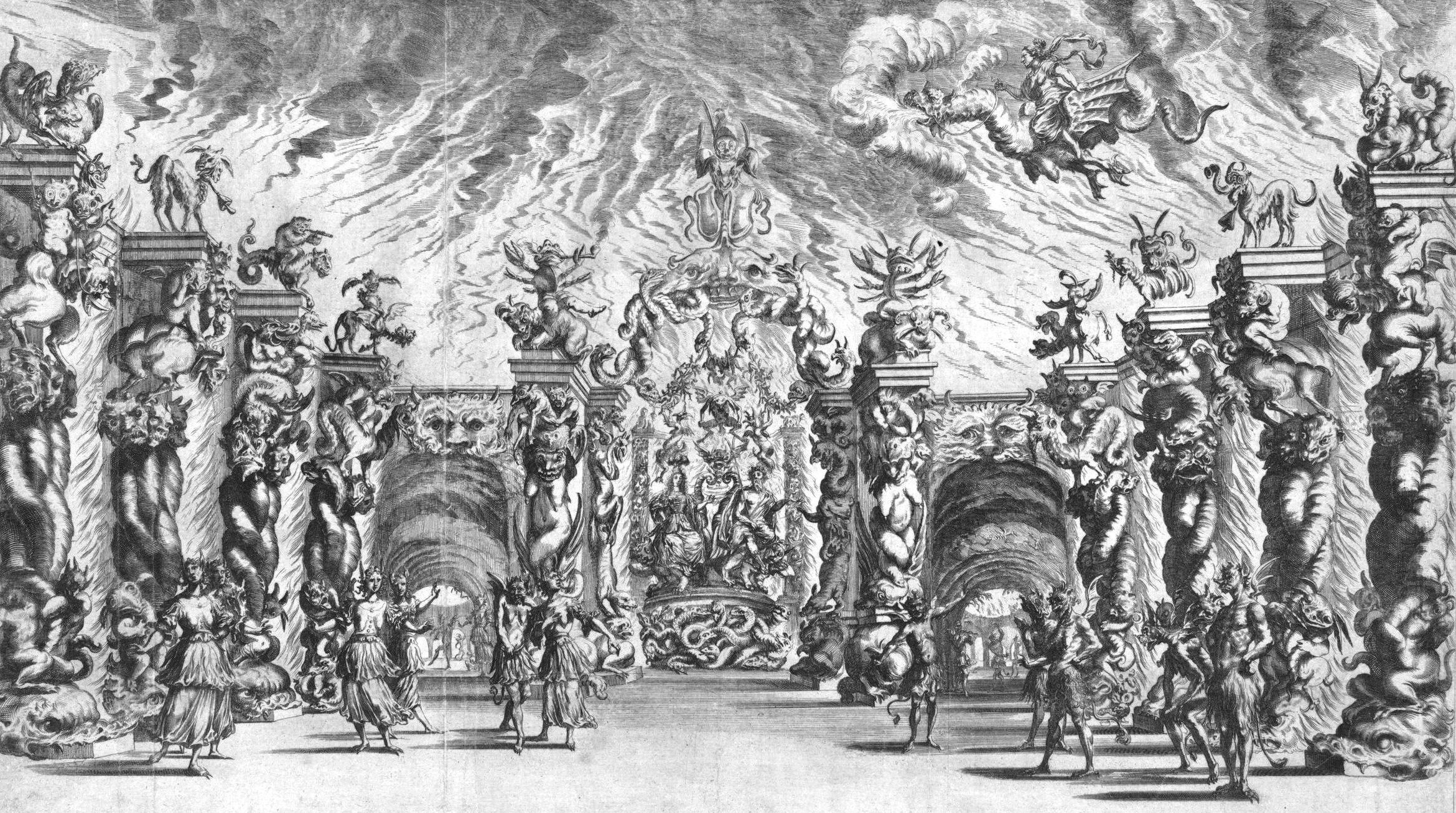
Scenography by Ludovico Ottavio Burnacini for the opera Il pomo d'oro by Antonio Cesti (1668)

In Venice the concept of bel canto emerged, which became popular especially in the first half of the 18th century and again in the first half of the 19th century in Italy. It is a vocal technique of difficult execution consisting of maintaining a uniform tone passing from one musical phrase to another without pauses, in a sustained legato that requires a powerful timbre and harmonic articulation. The main interpreters of bel canto were the castrati and the prima donna sopranos. On the other hand, at this time emerged the arioso, an intermediate song between the recitative and the aria, which over time became closed numbers with a tendency to ornamentation. Likewise, from the years 1630–1640 the ensemble, the conjunction of voices in different numbers, was gaining relevance: duet, trio, quartet, quintet, sextet, septet and octet.

The Venetian opera was particularly influenced by the Spanish theater of the so-called Golden Age—especially Lope de Vega—perceptible in the plot confluence between fantasy and reality—a path started with Don Quixote by Cervantes—the abandonment of the Aristotelian units, the coexistence of comic and tragic characters, the relationships between lords and servants, the taste for entanglement and for disguises and cross-dressed characters. In the Venetian operatic milieu these features were called all'usanza spagnuola.

Claudio Monteverdi settled in 1613 in Venice, where he was maestro di cappella of the St. Mark's Basilica. There he composed twelve operas, the principal of which are Il ritorno d'Ulisse in patria (1640) and L'incoronazione di Poppea (1642). The latter is considered his best opera, with libretto by Giovanni Francesco Busenello, based on works by Tacitus and Suetonius. It was one of the first operas with a historical rather than a mythological plot.

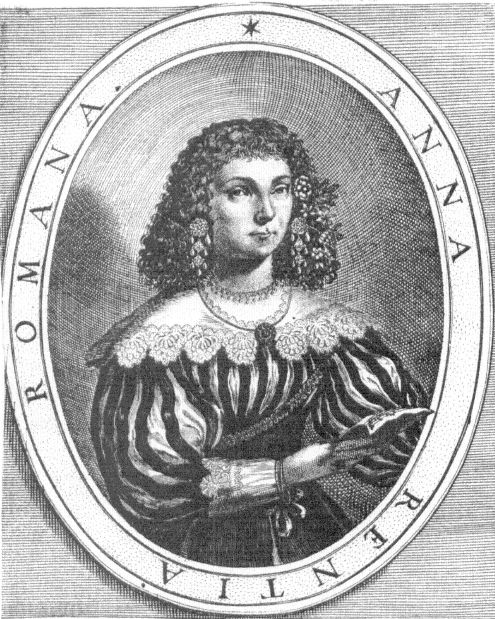
Anna Renzi, considered the first prima donna of the opera

One of his disciples, Pier Francesco Cavalli, introduced some novelties, such as the use of short arias, in works like L'Egisto (1643), La Calisto (1651), Statira principessa di Persia (1656) and Ercole amante (1662). He was director of the Teatro San Cassiano, with a contract to write one opera a year. Another exponent was Marc'Antonio Cesti, who still further reduced the orchestra, as in Orontea (1649) and Cesare amante (1651). He performed some operas for the emperor Leopold I (Il pomo d'oro, 1668), thus introducing opera into the Germanic sphere. Antonio Sartorio was for ten years maestro di cappella at the ducal court of Brunswick-Lüneburg, until he returned to his native city and was appointed maestro di cappella of St. Mark's Basilica. He is remembered as the introducer of the musical parliament. His major work was Orfeo (1672), which reaped great success. Giovanni Legrenzi was director of the Ospedale dei Mendicanti in Venice and maestro di cappella of St. Mark's Basilica. He composed fourteen operas for various Venetian theaters, many of which have been lost. He introduced the heroic-comic genre, as in his operas Totila (1677), Giustino (1683) and I due Cesari (1683). Pietro Andrea Ziani started in religious music, which he abandoned to devote himself to opera. He succeeded Cavalli as organist of San Marco. His most important works were L'Antigona delusa da Alceste (1660) and La Circe (1665). His nephew, Marco Antonio Ziani, was also an operist in Naples and Vienna.

In the vocal field, Anna Renzi, the first soprano to achieve the status of prima donna, stood out. She played Octavia, wife of Nero, in Monteverdi's L'incoronazione di Poppea. The castrato Siface was also popular with the public, and counted among his admirers Christina of Sweden and Henry Purcell.

=== Development in Europe ===
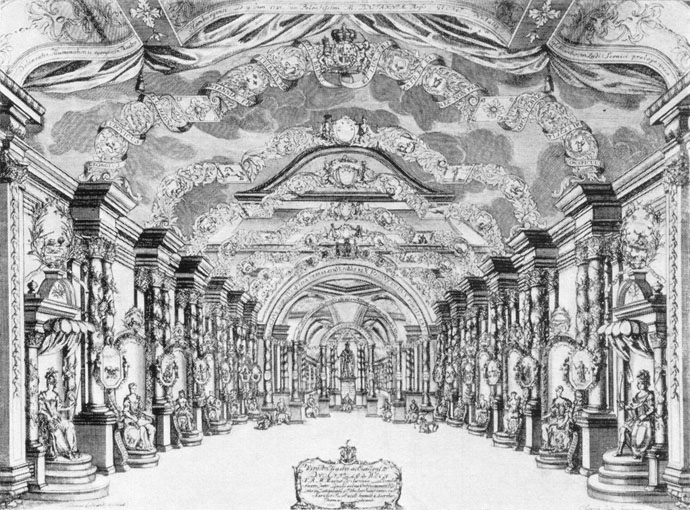
Oper am Gänsemarkt, Hamburg

Throughout the seventeenth century opera spread throughout Europe, generally under Italian influence. In Germany -then divided into numerous states of varying political configuration-, the pioneer was Heinrich Schütz, who in 1627 adapted Rinuccini's Dafne, with a clear Monteverdian influence. In 1644, Sigmund Theophil Staden composed Seelewig, the first opera in German. In 1678 the Oper am Gänsemarkt in Hamburg opened, becoming the leading operatic city in the Germanic area. In Munich, the elector Ferdinand Maria of Bavaria sponsored opera, to which Johann Caspar Kerll and Agostino Steffani devoted themselves. The latter inaugurated the Schlossopernhaus in Hannover in 1689 with Enrico Leone.

The leading composer of this period was Reinhard Keiser, the first to write operas entirely in German. He composed several operas that enjoyed great success, such as Adonis (1697), Claudius (1703), Octavia (1705) and Croesus (1710). He was director of the Theater am Gänsemarkt, where he premiered on average about five operas per season; his output is estimated to be between seventy-five and one hundred operas, although only nineteen complete ones survive. Other authors of the period were: Johann Wolfgang Franck (Die drey Töchter Cecrops, 1679) and Christoph Graupner (Dido, Königin von Carthage, 1707; Bellerophon, 1708).

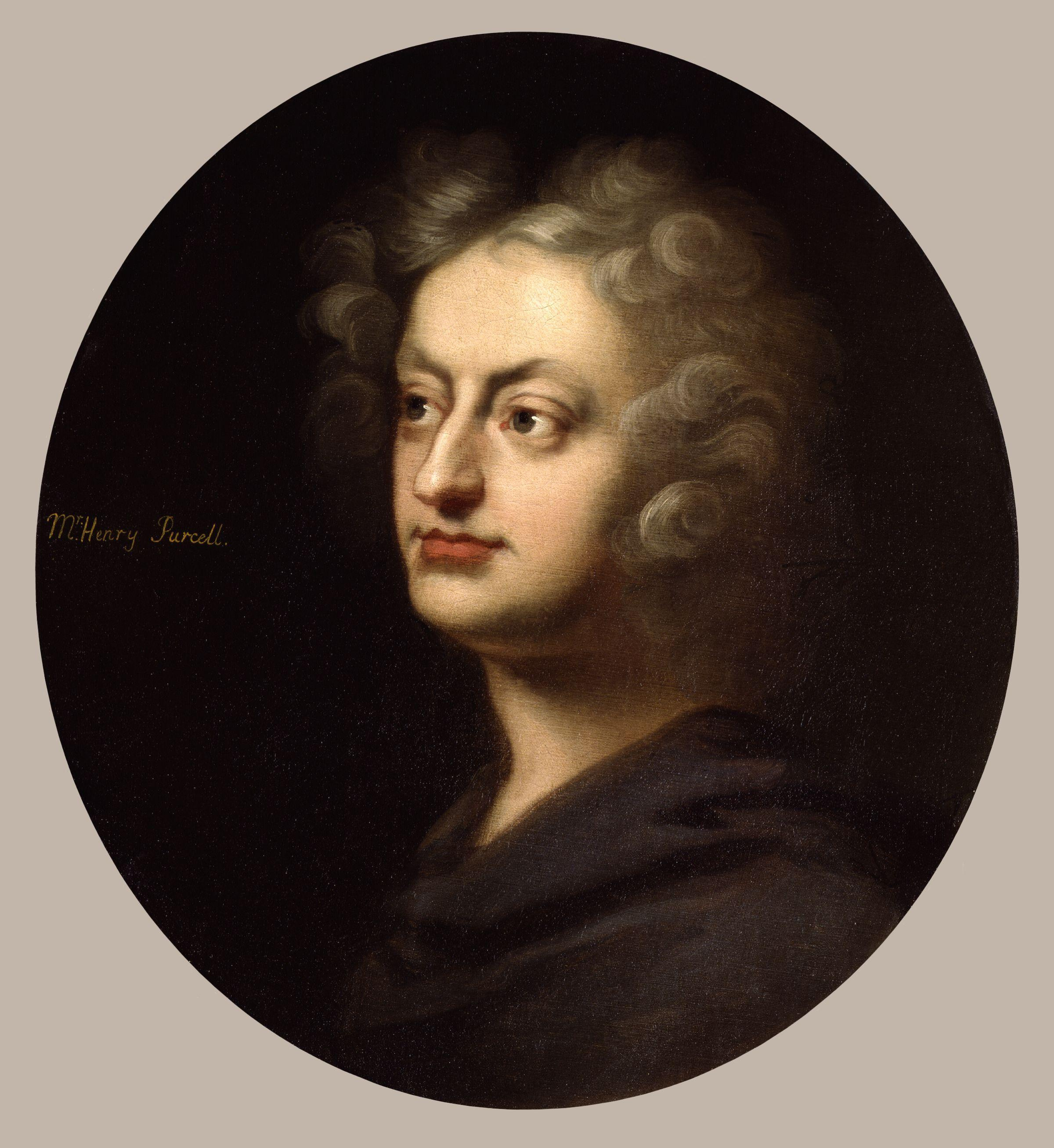
Henry Purcell

In Austria, Emperor Leopold I of the Holy Roman Empire encouraged opera after hearing Cesti's Il pomo d'oro (1668). Its performance took place at the Hofburg Imperial Palace in Vienna, to which only the court had access. Most were Italian operas, although Austrian composers were gradually added, most notably Heinrich Ignaz Biber: Applausi festivi di Giove (1686), Chi la dura la vince (1687), Arminio (1692). In 1748 the Burgtheater, also located in the Hofburg, was opened. The first public theater was the Theater am Kärntnertor, opened in 1761, which eventually became the official court theater.

Dido's Lament, final aria from the opera Dido and Aeneas (1689), by Henry Purcell

In England there was a precedent for opera, the masque (masque), which combined music, dance and theater in verse. During the Puritan Revolution of Oliver Cromwell music was banned. Despite this, the first English opera, The Siege of Rhodes (The Siege of Rhodes), was given in 1656, with libretto by playwright William Davenant and music by five composers: Henry Lawes, Matthew Locke, Henry Cooke, Charles Coleman and George Hudson. Subsequently, the reign of Charles II saw a revival of theatrical and operatic performances. The first opera composer of note was John Blow, organist and composer of the Chapel Royal. He composed preferably religious and entertainment music for the court and was the author of an opera, Venus and Adonis (1682), a short work that included French-influenced ballets. Of particular note was his pupil, Henry Purcell, author of Dido and Aeneas (1689), a French-influenced work with short arias and dances. It was a commission for a college of young ladies, which they were to perform themselves, with a small instrumental ensemble. It is a short work, lasting an hour, but which Purcell resolved brilliantly: its final aria, the so-called "Dido's lament" (When I am laid in earth), enjoys just fame. He also composed several semi-operas inspired by masquerades, including divertissements, songs, choirs and dances, such as Dioclesian (1690), King Arthur (1691), The Fairy Queen (1692), Timon of Athens (1694), The Indian Queen (1695), and The Tempest (1695). This period saw the life of the playwright William Shakespeare, whose plays were adapted to opera on numerous occasions from his time to the present day.

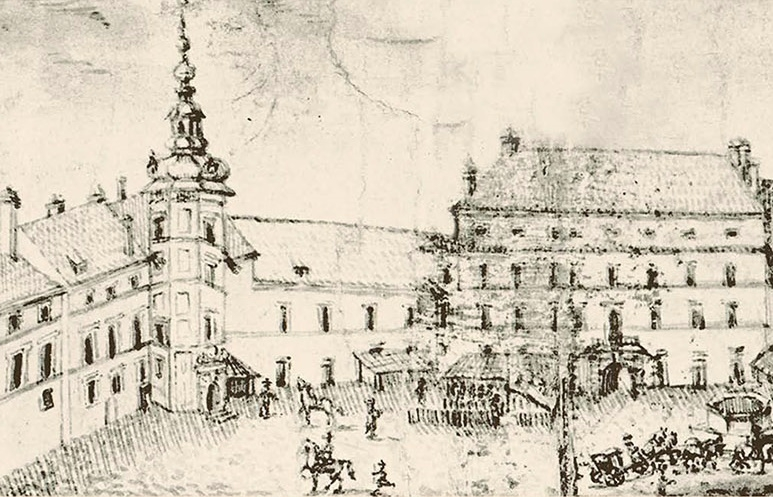
Building of the opera house of Ladislaus IV (right) in the Royal Castle, Warsaw

In Poland, opera was sponsored by King Ladislaus IV, who had witnessed an opera performance in Tuscany. In 1632 he created a company with Italian singers, who performed several operas in Warsaw. This company premiered the first opera by a Polish author-although written in Italian-, La fama reale (1633), by Piotr Elert.

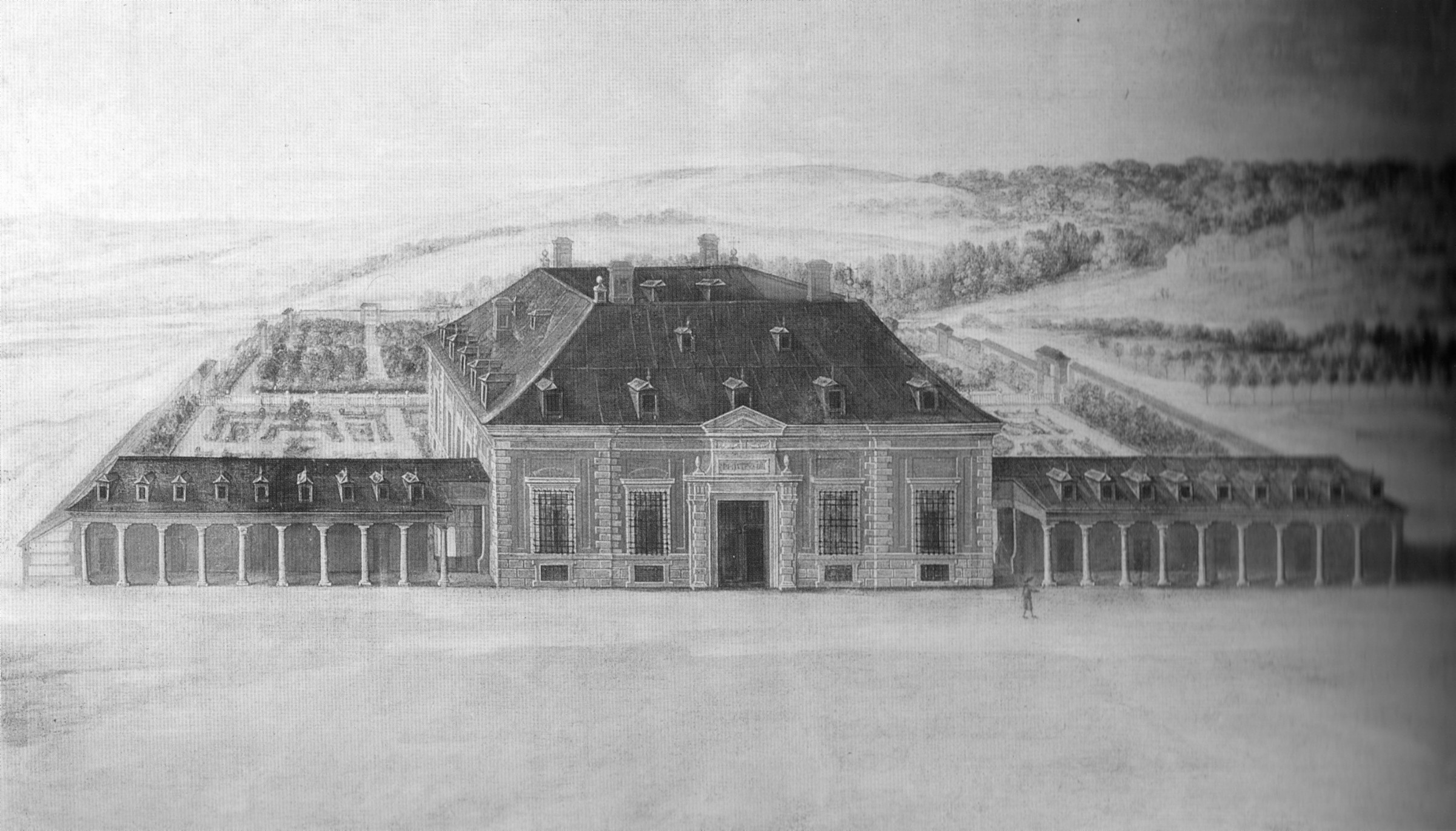
Palacio de la Zarzuela in Madrid, where the genre of zarzuela was born

In Spain, opera arrived with some delay due to the social crisis caused by the Thirty Years' War. The first opera was premiered in 1627 at the Alcázar de Madrid: La selva sin amor, a pastoral eclogue composed by Bernardo Monanni and Filippo Piccinini on a text by Lope de Vega; the score is not preserved. Tomás de Torrejón y Velasco composed in 1659 La púrpura de la rosa, with text by Pedro Calderón de la Barca, the first opera composed and performed in America, premiered at the Viceroyal Palace of Lima. Juan Hidalgo was the author of Celos aun del aire matan (1660), also with text by Calderón.

In the mid 17th century, King Felipe IV sponsored the performance of operettas at the Zarzuela Palace in Madrid, giving rise to a new genre: the zarzuela. The first zarzuelista was Juan Hidalgo, author in 1658 of El laurel de Apolo, with text by Calderón, which was followed by Ni amor se libra de amor (1662, Calderón de la Barca), La estatua de Prometeo (1670, Calderón de la Barca), Alfeo y Aretusa (1672, Juan Bautista Diamante), Los juegos olímpicos (1673, Agustín de Salazar y Torres), Apolo y Leucotea (1684, Pedro Scotti de Agoiz) and Endimión y Diana (1684, Melchor Fernández de León). Subsequently, the work of Sebastián Durón stood out, with librettos by José de Cañizares (Salir el amor del mundo, 1696), and by Antonio Literes (Júpiter y Dánae, 1708). After the death of Philip IV, the zarzuela moved to the Teatro del Buen Retiro in Madrid.

=== Neapolitan opera ===
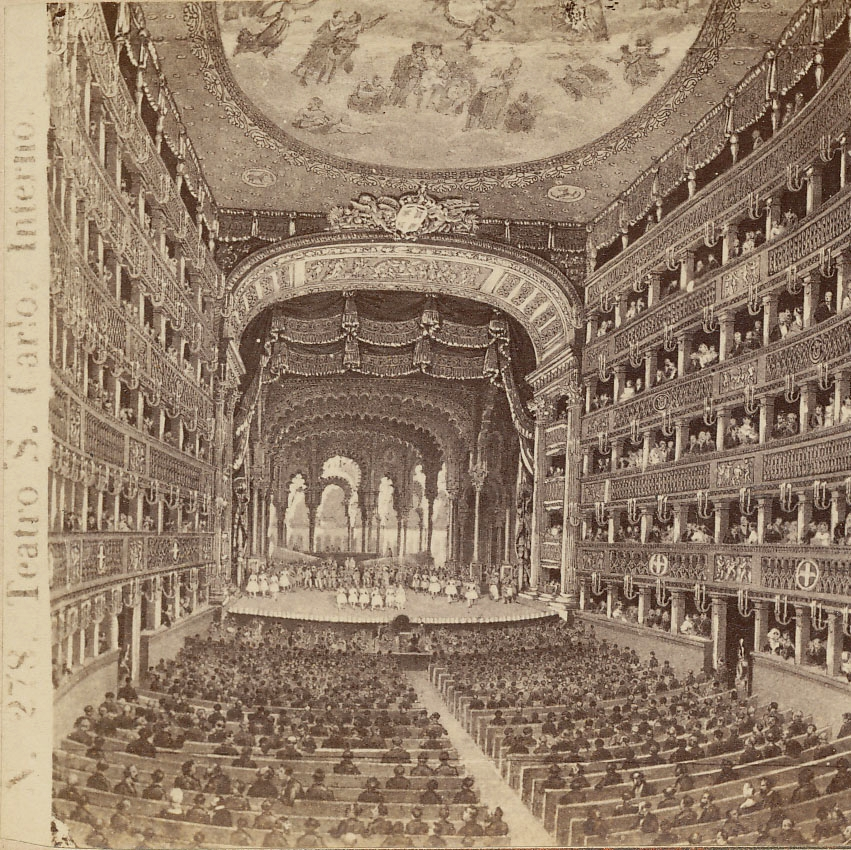
Teatro San Carlo, Naples

In the second half of the 17th century, the Neapolitan School introduced a more purist, classicist style, with simplified plots and more cultured and sophisticated operas. At that time, Naples was a Spanish possession, and the opera had the patronage of the Spanish viceroys, especially conde de Oñate. Among the main novelties, a distinction was made between two types of recitative: secco, a declamatory song with basso continuo accompaniment; and accompagnato, a melodic song with orchestral music. In the arias, space was left for vocal improvisations by the singers. Comic characters were eliminated, which gave as a counterpart the inclusion of comic intermezzi which, already in the 18th century, gave rise to the opera buffa. In 1737, the Teatro San Carlo of Naples, one of the most prestigious in the world, was inaugurated.

One of its first composers was Francesco Provenzale, author of Lo schiavo di sua moglie (1672) and Difendere l'offensore overo La Stellidaura vendicante (1674). Also considered a precursor of this type of opera is Alessandro Stradella, despite the fact that he composed most of his operas in Genoa: Trespolo tutore (1677), La forza dell'amor patterno (1678), La gare dell'amor eroico (1679).

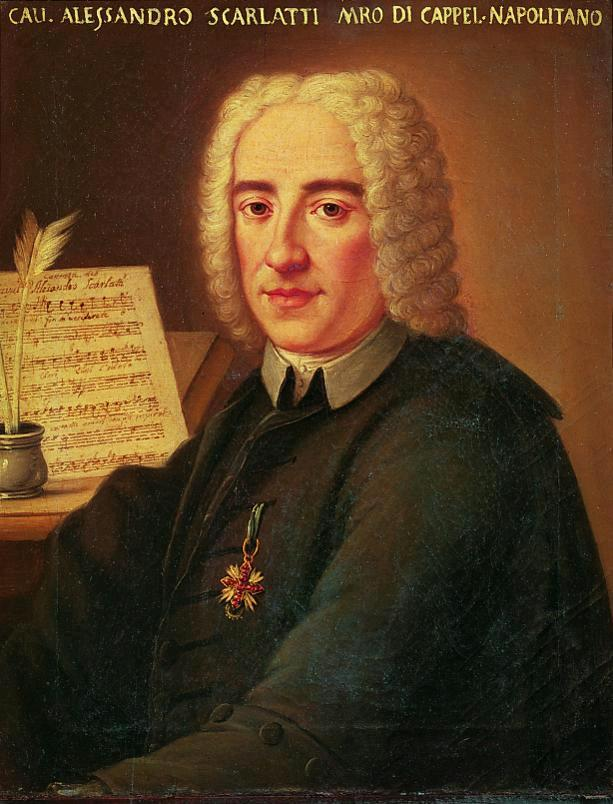
Alessandro Scarlatti

Its main representative was Alessandro Scarlatti, who was chapel master of Christina, Queen of Sweden and of the viceroy of Naples, as well as director of the Teatro San Bartolomeo in Naples. In his works he introduced numerous novelties: he created the three-part aria (aria da capo), with a theme-variation-theme structure (ABA); he reduced vocal ornamentations and suppressed the improvisations often performed by the singers; he also reduced the recitatives and lengthened the arias, in a recitative-aria alternation, and added a shorter type of arias (cavatina) to give greater speed to the work, performed by secondary characters; on the other hand, together with his usual librettist, Apostolo Zeno, he eliminated the comic characters and the interspersed plots, following only the original story. Scarlattian melody was generally simpler than Monteverdi's, but endowed with a special charm, which led Luigi Fait to comment that "with Scarlatti, Italian opera reaches the height of its beauty". There are 114 known operas by Scarlatti, including Il Mitridate Eupatore (1707), Tigrane (1715), Il trionfo dell'onore (1718) and Griselda (1721). His son Domenico Scarlatti also composed operas: L'Ottavia restituita al soglio (1703), La Dirindina (1715).

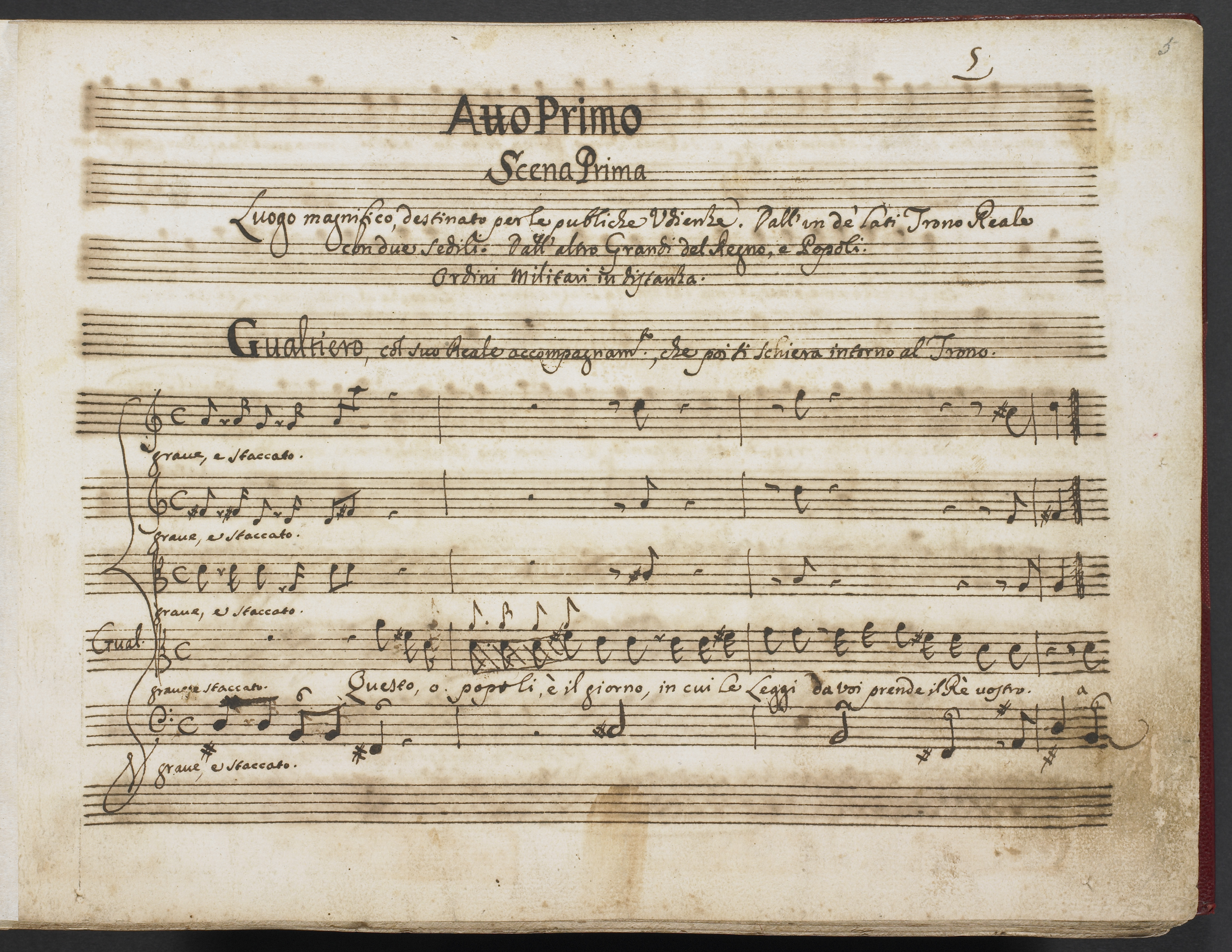
Manuscript score by Alessandro Scarlatti of the opera Griselda (1721), act I, scene I

Another outstanding exponent was Giovanni Battista Pergolesi. He died at the age of twenty-six, but had a successful career. In 1732 he composed his first opera, La Salustia, which failed, and Lo frate 'nnamorato, of comic genre, which reaped a notable success. The following year he premiered Il prigionier superbo, in whose intermissions was performed the comic play La serva padrona, which was more successful than the main work. In 1734 he composed Adriano in Siria, with libretto by Pietro Metastasio, in whose intermissions was performed the comic play Livietta e Tracollo, which was more successful than the main work. The following year he premiered L'Olimpiade, still with libretto by Metastasio, and his last work, Il Flaminio, of comic genre, which reaped a notable success.

Nicola Porpora taught singing – he had Farinelli and Caffarelli as pupils – and composition – among his pupils is Johann Adolph Hasse. He was one of the first to musicalize librettos by Pietro Metastasio. Among his early operas are Agrippina (1708), Arianna e Teseo (1714) and Angelica (1720). In 1726 he moved to Venice and, in 1733, to London, where he was musical director of the Opera of the Nobility located at the King's Theatre, where he premiered Arianna in Nasso (1733). He later worked in Dresden, where he premiered Filandro (1747), as well as Vienna, before returning to Naples, where he died in poverty.

Other distinguished representatives were Leonardo Vinci, Leonardo Leo and Giovanni Bononcini. Vinci made his debut at the age of twenty-three with Lo cecato fauzo (The false blind man, 1719). In 1722 he composed Li zite 'ngalera (The lovers of the galley), of comic genre. That same year he reaped a great success with Publio Cornelio Scipione, which turned him towards serious opera. In 1724, he renewed his success with Farnace, which took him to Rome and Venice. It was followed by Didone abbandonata and Siroe, re di Persia, both from 1726 and with libretto by Pietro Metastasio. Until his death in 1730 he composed two operas per year, including Alessandro nell'Indie and Artaserse, both from 1730 and again with librettos by Metastasio. Leo was an organist and church musician. His first opera was Il Pisistrate (1714), at the age of nineteen. In 1725 he was appointed organist of the chapel of the viceroy of Naples. His works were more conservative than those of Vinci and Porpora, based largely on counterpoint. Among them stands out L'Olimpiade (1737), with libretto by Metastasio. He also composed several comic operas, to which he gave respectability for the commitment he put into them. Bononcini had a great initial success with Il trionfo di Camilla (1696, with libretto by Silvio Stampiglia), which was performed in nineteen Italian cities. In 1697 he settled in Vienna, in the service of the emperor Joseph I, until in 1719 he was hired by the Royal Academy of Music in London. His works include Gli affetti più grandi vinti dal più giusto (1701), Griselda (1722) and Zenobia (1737). Mention should also be made of: Francesco Feo (L'amor tirannico, 1713; Siface, 1723; Ipermestra, 1724), Gaetano Latilla (Angelica e Orlando, 1735) and Francesco Mancini Mancini (L'Alfonso, 1699; Idaspe fedele, 1710; Traiano, 1721).

== Late Baroque: opera seria and buffa ==
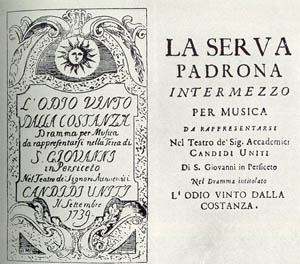
La serva padrona by Giovanni Battista Pergolesi (1733), contemporary edition of the libretto

The musical production of the first half of the 18th century is usually called late Baroque. The main center of production continued to be Italy, especially Naples and Venice. In 1732 the Teatro Argentina in Rome was inaugurated. Italian influence spread throughout Europe: Italian companies were established at the Dresden Opera House, at the court of the Elector of Saxony and at the Royal Academy of Music in London. The only non-Italian national school was in France. During this period, scenography developed notably, thanks above all to the Italian Ferdinando Galli Bibbiena—whose work was continued by his sons Antonio and Giuseppe—who introduced theatrical perspective and numerous stage effects. Between 1700 and 1750 was the era of classical bel canto, when the stages were dominated by castrati and prime donne.

Around the second quarter of the 18th century opera was gradually divided into two contrasting genres: the opera seria and the opera buffa. The themes of opera seria were generally drawn from classical mythology, with a moralistic component, showing the more virtuous side of the heroes of old age. Generally, the action was centered on the recitatives and the arias were left for lyrical incursions by the singers, with a preference for the da capo aria, which experienced its golden age. Serious opera wanted to strip lyrical dramas of the extravagances and convoluted plots used until then, with a more sober style inspired by ancient Greek theater. One of its major theorists was Giovanni Vincenzo Gravina, co-founder of the Academy of Arcadia.

However, the disappearance of comic characters left a certain void in a sector of the public, generally lower class, who liked these characters. To satisfy them, intermezzi were introduced in the intermissions of the plays, which gradually gained success until they became separate works. A good example was La serva padrona by Pergolesi (1733). From then on these intermezzi became independent and became shows of their own. The opera buffa was of comic genre, intended for a more popular audience, influenced by the Commedia dell'arte. It included arias and recitatives, but with second-rank performers, who sang with their natural voices, without castrati or sopranos. The arias were shorter and the recitatives kept the music, unlike in Spanish zarzuela or German singspiel, which included only spoken parts. There were also duets, trios and quartets, absent from opera seria. In opera buffa a type of rapid, syllabic declamation called parlando was characteristic. Also frequent was the presence of stuttering, yawning or sneezing. The music, generally stringed, was simple, of small orchestras, although over time it would be equated with that of opera seria. Eventually, both genres tended to merge, with the appearance of the semi-serious opera or dramma giocoso.

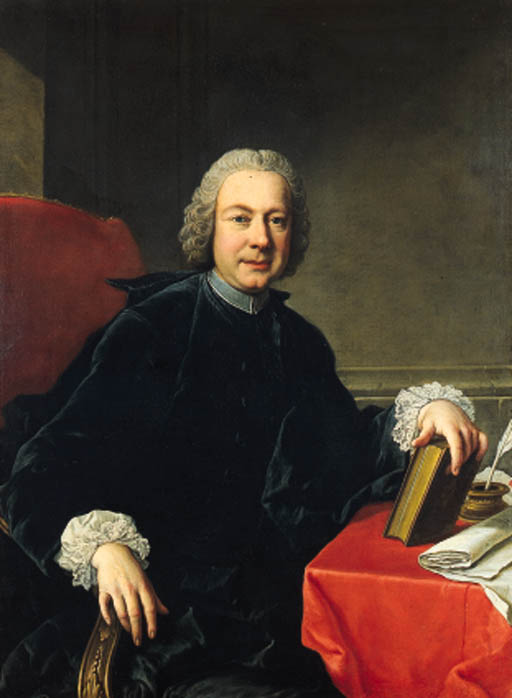
Pietro Metastasio

Some of the characteristic elements of the opera buffa were: the use of the recitative accompagnato, greater use of choir and ensembles, and the use of the cavatina and the aria con pertichini, a modality based on an aria -generally da capo – to which were added comments in recitative by characters who watched the scene from outside, generating a form of ensemble. The introduzione and the finale, scenes that usually brought together all the characters of the work, singing in ensemble, also became more relevant.

In the field of opera seria, a unique phenomenon in the history of opera took place in this period: librettists were more relevant than composers, especially two: Apostolo Zeno and Pietro Metastasio. Zeno was a Venetian historian and librarian who, after dabbling in the field of opera libretti, was always eager to have them considered a literary genre of the first rank. In 1718, he replaced Silvio Stampiglia as imperial poet of Charles VI, for whom he was also imperial historiographer. He introduced historical themes into opera and, in his plots, always incorporated a code of honor to serve as an example for the public. He wrote thirty-five librettos, some of them in collaboration with Pietro Pariati, which were set to music by composers such as Albinoni, Caldara, Gasparini, Scarlatti and Händel. A generation younger, Metastasio was directly influenced by Zeno, whom he replaced as imperial poet. In a fifty-year career he wrote twenty-seven librettos that were set to music in some one hundred operas. He was a great reformer of operatic writing, to the point that one often speaks of "metastasian opera" for his works. His librettos were elegant and sophisticated, and he gave greater prominence to the soloists. Zeno and Metastasio introduced the so-called "doctrine of the affections", whereby every emotion (love, hate, sadness, hope, despair) was expressed by a certain musical form (aria, chorale, instrumental movement).

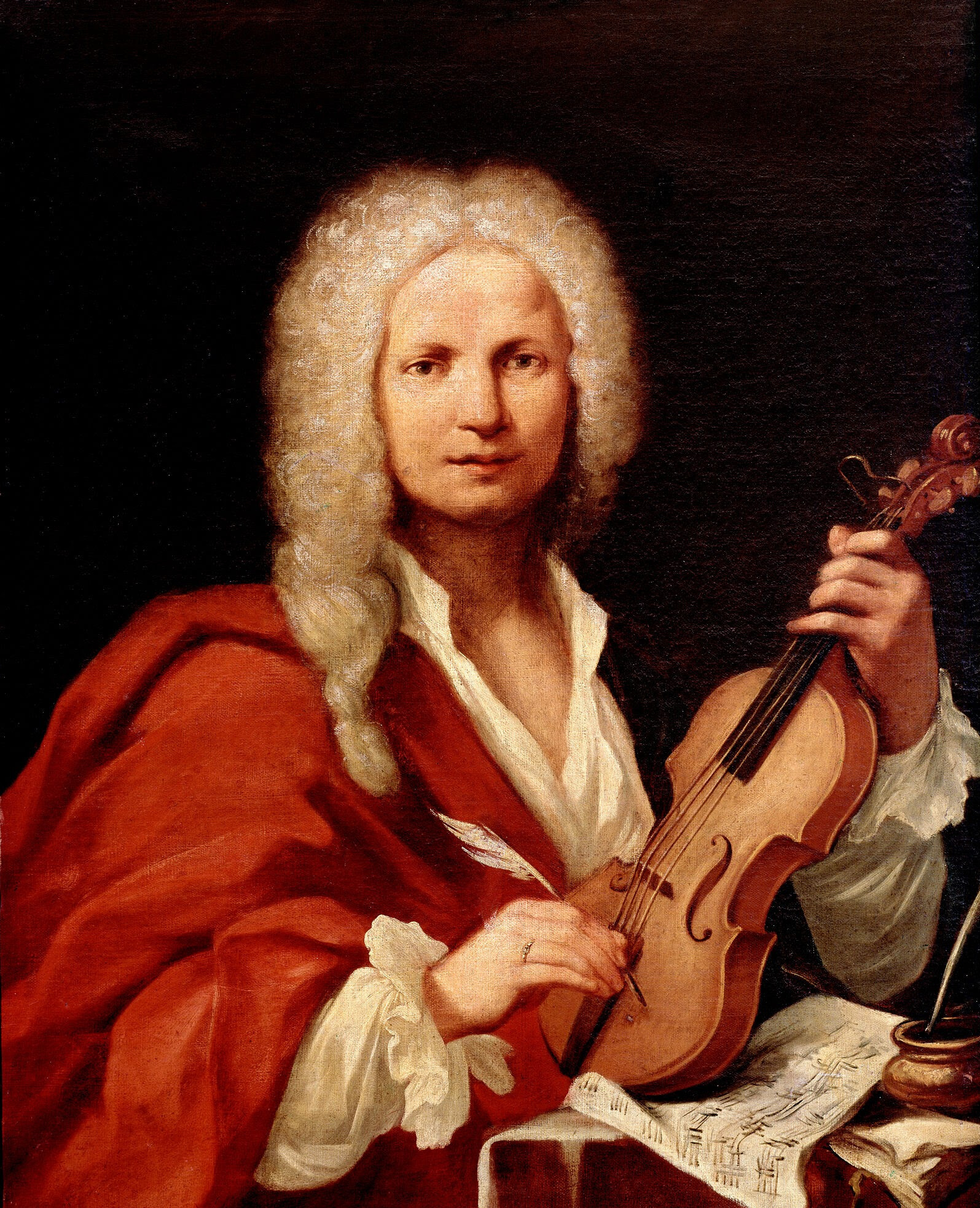
Antonio Vivaldi

Venice remained one of the main operatic centers. Antonio Vivaldi, the main representative of the Italian late-baroque school, stood out. He was chapel master of the Ospedale della Pietà in Venice, where he was able to rely on the orphans of the hospice to form a large orchestra, for which he is considered the first great master of orchestral music. He devoted himself to opera both as a composer and impresario. In 1739 he claimed to have written ninety-four operas, although only about fifty librettos and twenty scores survive. Notable among his works are: Ottone in villa (1713), Orlando finto pazzo (1714), La costanza trionfante degl'amori e degl'odii (1716), Teuzzone (1719), Tito Manlio (1719), Il Giustino (1724), Farnace' (1727), Orlando furioso(1727), Bajazet (1735), Ginevra (1736) and Catone in Utica (1737).

Tomaso Albinoni was a brilliant composer, famous for his Adagio, although he also dabbled in opera. Concerned with the harmony of the vocal ensemble, he provided serenity and balance to the slow movements, with special attention to the lower voices. His works include Zenobia, regina dei Palmireni (1694), Pimpinone (1708) and Didone abbandonata (1724). Other Venetian composers of the period were: Ferdinando Bertoni (Orfeo ed Euridice, 1776; Quinto Fabio, 1778) and Francesco Gasparini (Roderico, 1694; Ambleto, 1705; Il Bajazet, 1719).

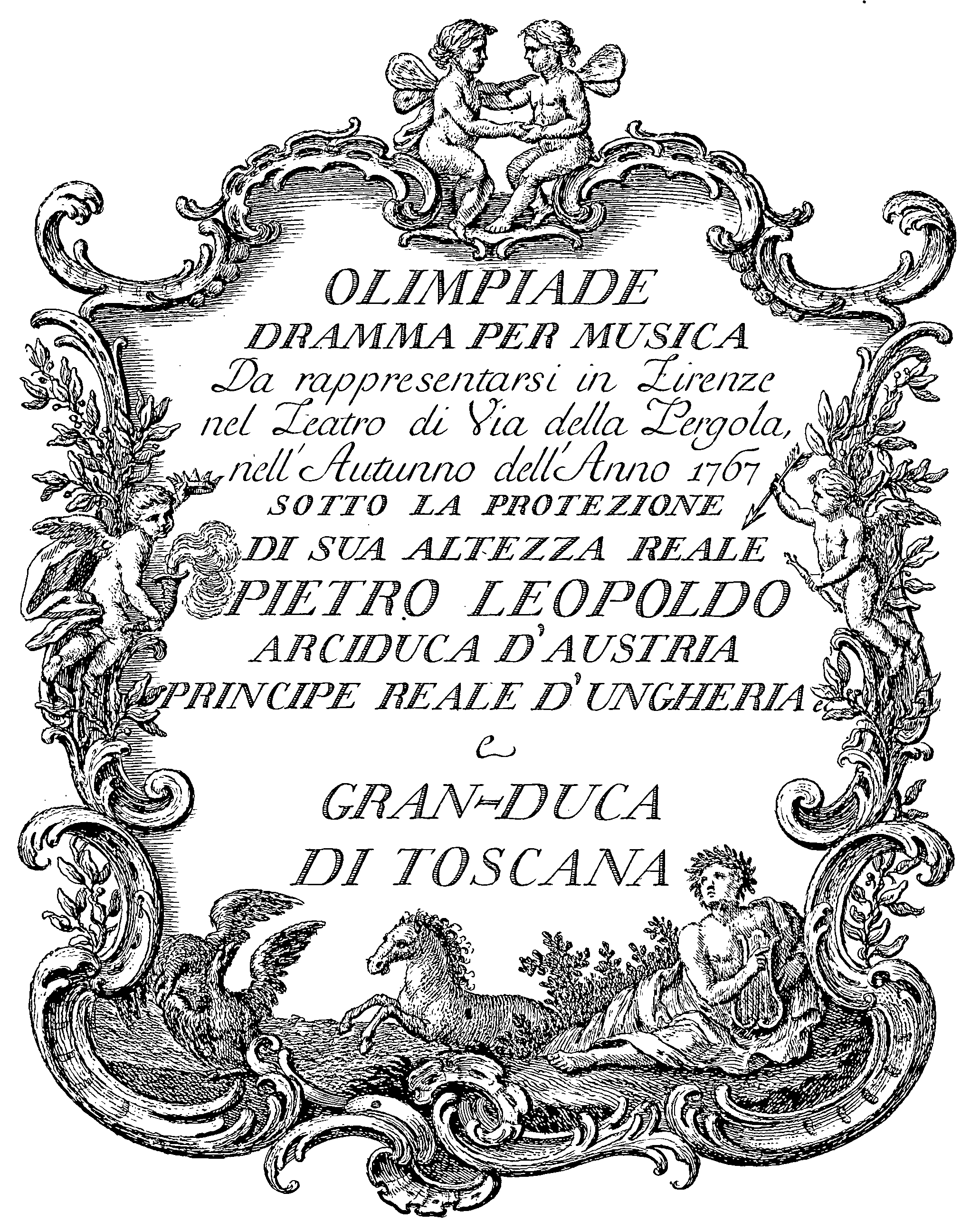
Cover from the libretto of L'Olimpiade (1767), by Tommaso Traetta (1767), by Tommaso Traetta

The Neapolitan school also continued, where the split between opera seria and opera buffa took place. Its main representatives in this period were Niccolò Jommelli and Tommaso Traetta. Jommelli premiered his first operas in Naples: L'errore amoroso (1737), Ricimero (1740) and Astianatte (1741). After reaping fame for these works he was appointed chapel master of St. Peter's at the Vatican in 1749 and, four years later, the same position in Stuttgart, for the duke of Württemberg. In Germany he composed thirty-three operas, and his style became so Germanized that on his return to his homeland his works were rejected by the public. Traetta was influenced by gluckian influence, which he combined with his prodigious ability to compose chorales and elegant melodies. His first compositions were for opera houses in Naples and Parma (Ippolito e Aricia, 1759; Iphigenia in Tauride, 1763). In 1765 he moved to Venice and, in 1768, to Russia, where he was appointed opera director by Empress Catherine II. There he composed, among others, Antigone (1772).

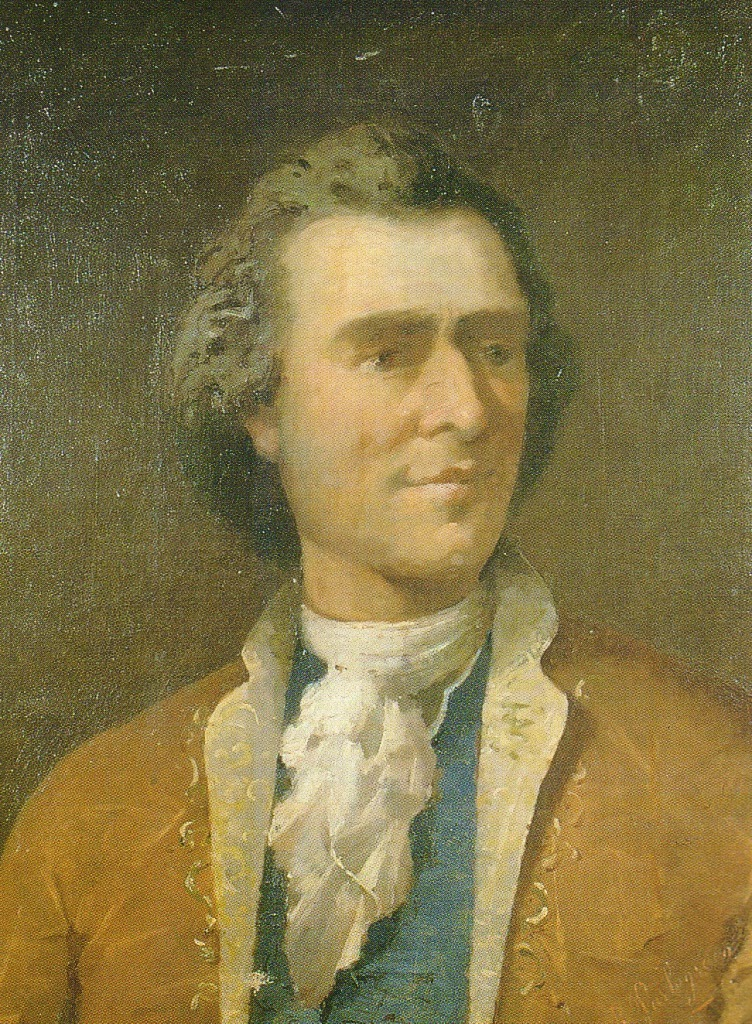
Domènec Terradellas

The Spanish Domingo Terradellas (also known in Italian as Domenico Terradeglias) is considered to belong to the Neapolitan school. He studied in Naples, where he was a pupil of Francesco Durante. In 1736 he premiered his first opera, Giuseppe riconosciuto. He moved to Rome, where he was chapel master of San Giacomo degli Spagnoli and premiered Astarto (1739), Merope (1743) and Semiramide riconosciuta (1746). He then went to London, where he composed Mitridate (1746) and Bellerofonte (1747). Back in Italy, he premiered in Turin Didone (1750), in Venice Imeneo in Atene (1750) and in Rome Sesostri (1751).

Mention should also be made of Gian Francesco de Majo and Davide Perez. The former began with Ricimero, re dei Goti (1759) and L'Almeria (1761). He spent some time in Mannheim, where he premiered Iphigenia in Tauride (1764), which influenced Gluck. Back in Naples, he made L'Ulisse (1769) and L'eroe cinese (1770). Perez, of Spanish origin, composed some buffa operas (La nemica amante, 1735), but mainly serious ones: Siroe (1740), Astarto (1743), Merope (1744), La clemenza di Tito (1749), Demofoonte (1752), Olimpiade (1754), Solimano (1757). Other representatives of the Neapolitan school were: Girolamo Abos (Artaserse, 1746; Alessandro nell'Indie, 1747), Pasquale Cafaro (La disfatta di Dario, 1756; Creso, 1768), Ignazio Fiorillo (L'Olimpiade, 1745), Pietro Alessandro Guglielmi (L'Olimpiade, 1763; Farnace, 1765; Sesostri, 1766; Alceste, 1768), Giacomo Insanguine (L'osteria di Marechiaro, 1768; Didone abbandonata, 1770) and Antonio Sacchini (La contadina in corte, 1765).

From the rest of Italy it is worth mentioning Antonio Caldara. He was maestro de cappella in Mantua and Rome before being appointed vice maestro de cappella of Emperor Charles VI in Vienna, where he remained for about twenty years. He collaborated regularly with the librettists Zeno and Metastasio. His work is notable for its use of large chorales. Among his works stand out: Il più bel nome (1708), Andromaca (1724), Demetrio (1731), Adriano in Siria (1732), L'Olimpiade (1733), Demofoonte (1733), Achille in Sciro (1736) and Ciro riconosciuto (1736). Mention should also be made of the Milanese Giovanni Battista Lampugnani (Candace, 1732; Antigono, 1736).

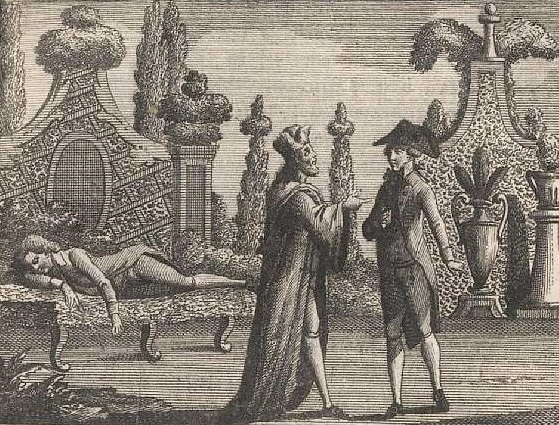
Illustration of the libretto of Il mondo della luna (1750) by Baldassare Galuppi

A librettist also stood out in opera buffa: Carlo Goldoni. A lawyer by profession, he worked as a librettist for several Venetian theaters. He wrote about a hundred librettos, in which he incorporated elements of the Commedia dell'arte, the typical Italian popular theater of Renaissance origin. His works featured real characters and everyday events, with simpler plots and witty dialogues that helped to humanize opera. His work influenced composers such as Mozart and, later, Rossini and Donizetti.

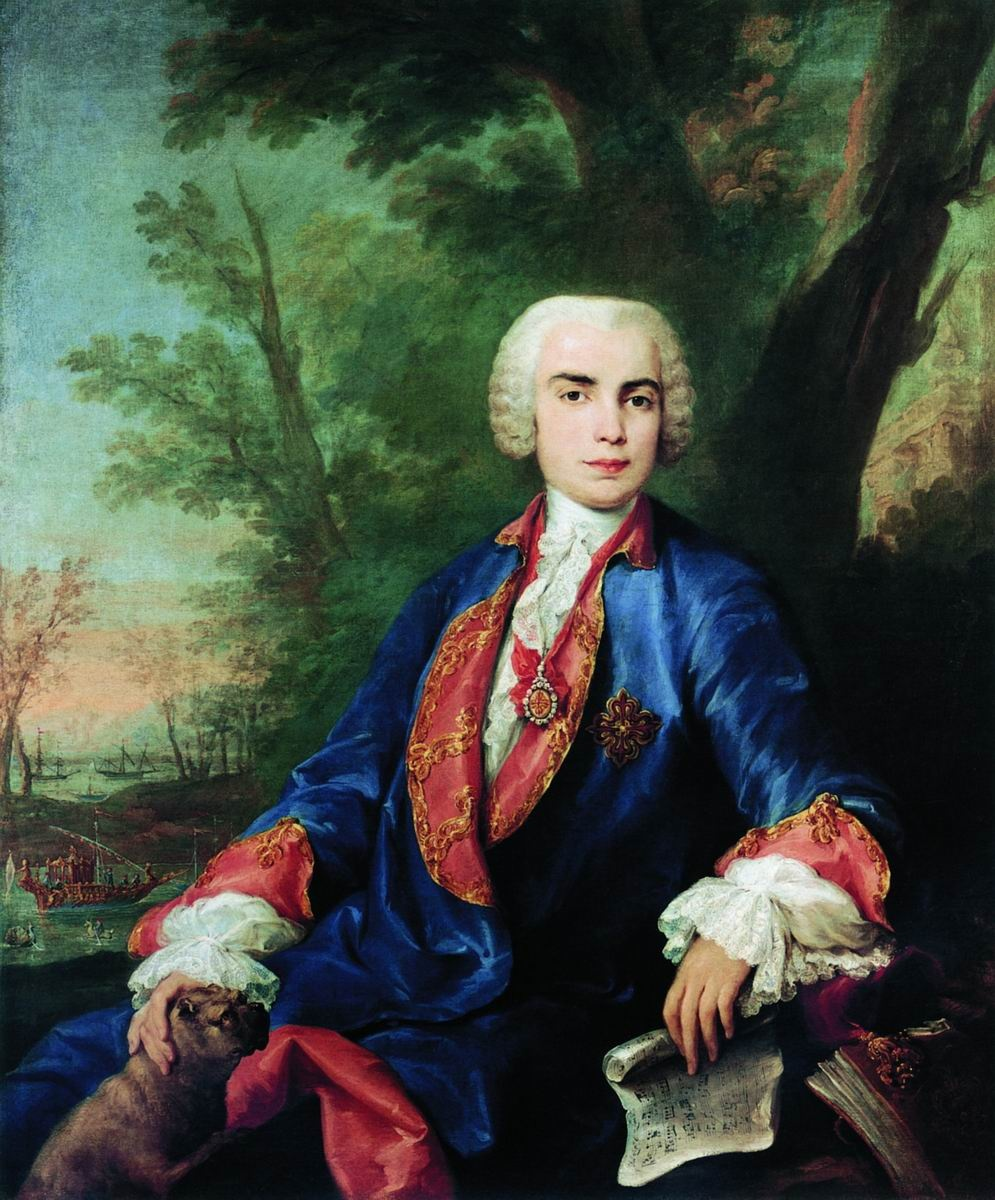
Carlo Broschi "Farinelli", one of the most famous castrati in history

Among the composers of opera buffa were Niccolò Piccinni and Baldassare Galuppi. The former was a prolific composer, author of about one hundred and twenty works. He began his career with Le donne dispettose (1754). His greatest success was La Cecchina, ossia la buona figliuola (1760), with libretto by Goldoni based on Pamela by Samuel Richardson, which is usually considered the first semi-serious opera. In 1776 he was invited to Paris, where he had a tense rivalry with Gluck: both composed an Iphigénie en Tauride, and Gluck's opera (1779) was more successful than Piccinni's (1781). Piccinni introduced the rondo aria, which had a slow and fast two-part structure, repeated twice. Galuppi wrote his first opera at the age of sixteen (La fede nell'incostanza, 1722). His first great success was with Dorinda in 1729. He composed about a hundred operas, a good part of them written for London: Scipione in Cartagine (1742), Sirbace (1743). In 1749 he composed L'Arcadia in Brenta, with a libretto by Carlo Goldoni, the first opera buffa of great length. It was followed by other comic operas such as Il mondo della luna (1750), Il mondo alla roversa (1750), La diavolessa (1755) and La cantarina (1756), but Galuppi and Goldoni's most famous joint work was the dramma giocoso Il filosofo di campagna (1754).

Other authors of opera buffa were: Pasquale Anfossi (La finta giardiniera, 1774; La maga Circe, 1788), Gennaro Astarita (Il corsaro algerino, 1765; L'astuta cameriera, 1770), Francesco Coradini (Lo 'ngiegno de le femmine, 1724; L'oracolo di Dejana, 1725), Domenico Fischietti (Il mercato di Malmantile, 1756), Giuseppe Gazzaniga (Don Giovanni Tenorio, 1787), Nicola Logroscino (Il governatore, 1747) and Giacomo Tritto (La fedeltà in amore, 1764).

At this time also appeared the pasticcio, an opera composed jointly by several composers. The first was Muzio Scevola (1721), which consisted of three acts each composed by Filippo Amadei, Giovanni Bononcini and Georg Friedrich Händel. Generally, rather than collaborating in a single homogeneous whole, most pasticci were a conglomerate of music, songs, dances, arias and chorales, which could be added successively.

In the vocal field, at this time it is worth remembering the sopranos Francesca Cuzzoni, Margherita Durastanti and Anna Maria Strada, and the mezzo-soprano Faustina Bordoni, who all performed in London for Händel. Bordoni and Cuzzoni maintained a strong rivalry between them, to the point that they came to blows in the performance of Bononcini's Astianatte in 1727. On the other hand, this was the golden age of the castrati, among whom Giovanni Carestini, Carlo Broschi "Farinelli", Nicolò Grimaldi "Nicolini", Francesco Bernardi "Senesino" and Antonio Maria Bernacchi stood out. The most famous was Farinelli, who performed all over Europe with great success. He retired at the age of thirty-two, at the height of his fame, and entered the service of Philip V of Spain.

=== France ===
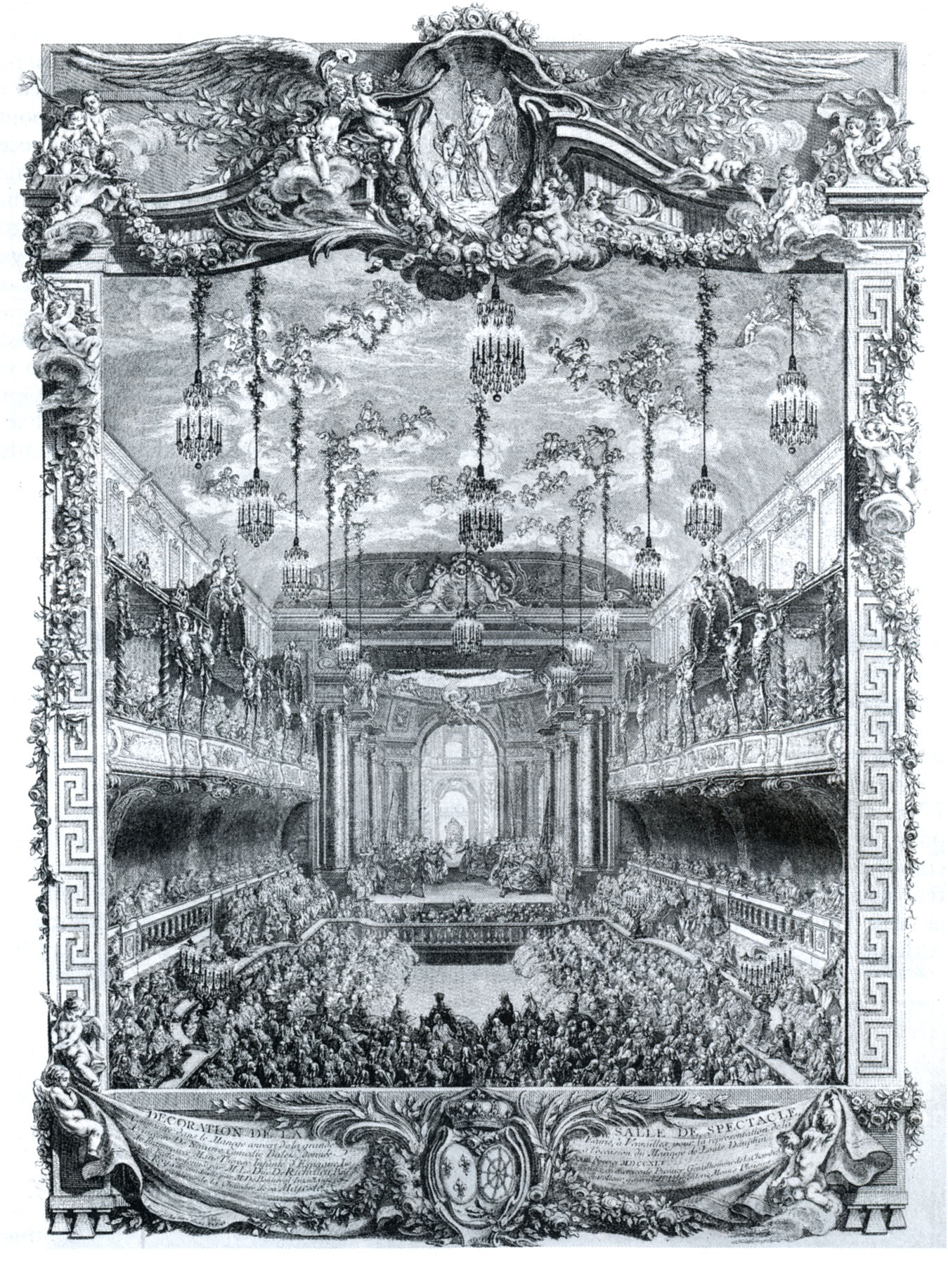
Performance of La Princesse de Navarre by Jean-Philippe Rameau on 23 February 1745 at the Théâtre de la Grande Écurie, Versailles, as part of the celebrations of the marriage of Louis, Dauphin of France (born 1729) to Maria Teresa Rafaela of Spain

At the beginning of this period the Lullian tragédie-lyrique still predominated, where the taste for ballet stood out. Just as Italian opera tended to have three long acts, French opera had five short ones, with ballets interspersed. The most prominent operatist of this period was Jean-Philippe Rameau. He held several jobs as organist and chapel master in various French cathedrals, while writing various treatises on music theory. It was not until he was fifty that he composed his first opera, Hippolyte et Aricie (1733), which was followed by Les Indes galantes (1735), Castor et Pollux (1737) and Dardanus (1739). After a few years of inactivity, in 1745 he composed La Princesse de Navarre, Le temple de la gloire—both by Voltaire—and the comic opera Platée. His last works include Zoroastre (1749) and Les boréades (1763). Rameau's operas enjoyed great popularity, while at the same time sparking intense debates between their defenders and detractors: in 1733 the so-called quarrel of Lullyists and Ramists broke out, between those who advocated maintaining the operatic tradition initiated by Lully and those who viewed with pleasure the new form introduced by Rameau, which placed more emphasis on the music than on the text. Similarly, in the 1750s the so-called jester's quarrel arose between supporters of Rameau, advocates of French opera seria, and the philosopher Jean-Jacques Rousseau and his followers, supporters of Italian opera buffa.

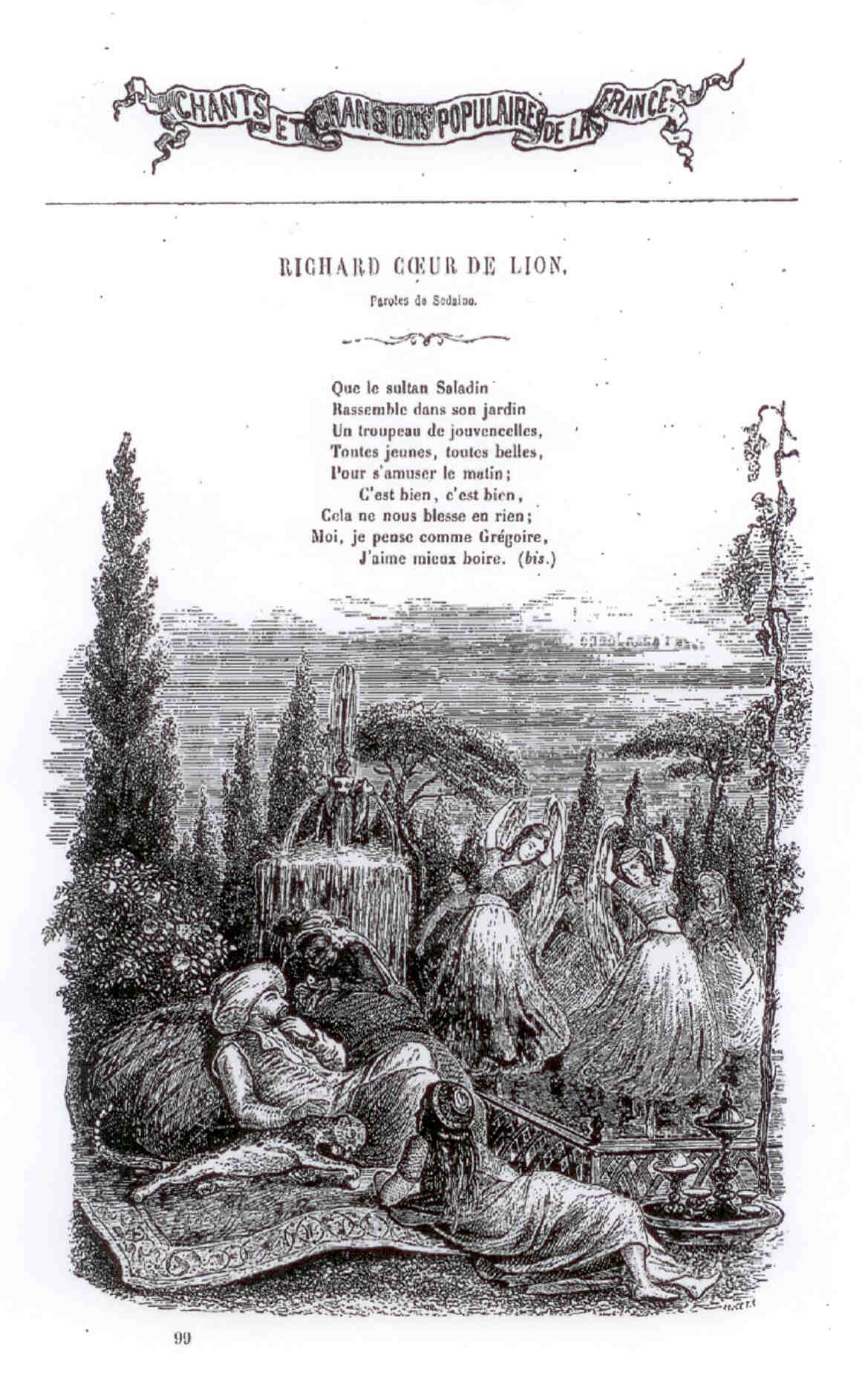
Song taken from opéra comique Richard Cœur-de-Lion, by André Grétry (1784)

André Cardinal Destouches was director of the Paris Opera from 1728 to 1731. His work influenced Rameau. He was the author of operas such as Omphale (1700), Callirhoé (1712), Télémaque (1714), Les Élémens (1721) and Les Stratagèmes de l'amour (1726). Henri Desmarets was a chapel master in the French Jesuit Order until, accused of the murder of his wife, he settled in Spain, where he served Philip V. He later lived in the Duchy of Lorraine, where his opera Le Temple d'Astrée opened the Nancy Theater in 1708. Another exponent was Michel Pignolet de Montéclair (Jephté, 1732).

The philosopher Jean-Jacques Rousseau, who was also an amateur composer, composed an opera, Le devin du village, in 1752. It was of poor quality, but was influential for its introduction of country characters shown as simple and virtuous people, as opposed to the cynical and corrupt nobility, ideals that were echoed in the French Revolution.

In France, opera buffa had its equivalent in the opéra-comique, a type of simple shows, with contemporary plots, generally of domestic and urban cut, and of conservative tone, in which technical innovations, cultural currents and social aspects in general, as well as the defects and customs of the characters, were ridiculed. It had certain elements in common with the Italian opera buffa, such as the taste for costumes and transvestism, or the characters inspired by the Commedia dell'arte. It was frequent the presence of a type of songs known as vaudeville. For this type of performances the Théâtre National de l'Opéra-Comique was created. Its main representatives were François-André Danican Philidor and André Ernest Modeste Grétry. The first one started in Italian opera, but when the public did not like it, he switched to comic opera, where he reaped great successes: Blaise le savetier (1759), Le sorcier (1764), Tom Jones (1765), Ernelinde, princesse de Norvège (1767). In his works he introduced extramusical sounds, such as that of a hammer or the braying of a donkey. Grétry won over audiences with his elegant and expressive melodies. His first success was Le Huron (1768), which was followed by Lucile and Le tableau parlant in 1769. He tried the serious genre with Andromaque (1780), which he did not resolve as well as his comic works. His greatest success was Richard Cœur-de-lion (1784).

Other opéra-comique composers were: Nicolas Dalayrac (Nina, ou La Folle par amour, 1786), Antoine Dauvergne (Les troqueurs, 1753), Egidio Romualdo Duni (Ninette à la cour, 1755; La fée Urgèle, 1765), François-Joseph Gossec (Les Pêcheurs de perles, 1766; Toinin et Toinette, 1767) and Pierre-Alexandre Monsigny (Le Cadi dupé, 1761; Le Roi et le fermier, 1762; Rose et Colas, 1764; Le Déserteur, 1769).

=== Germany and Austria ===
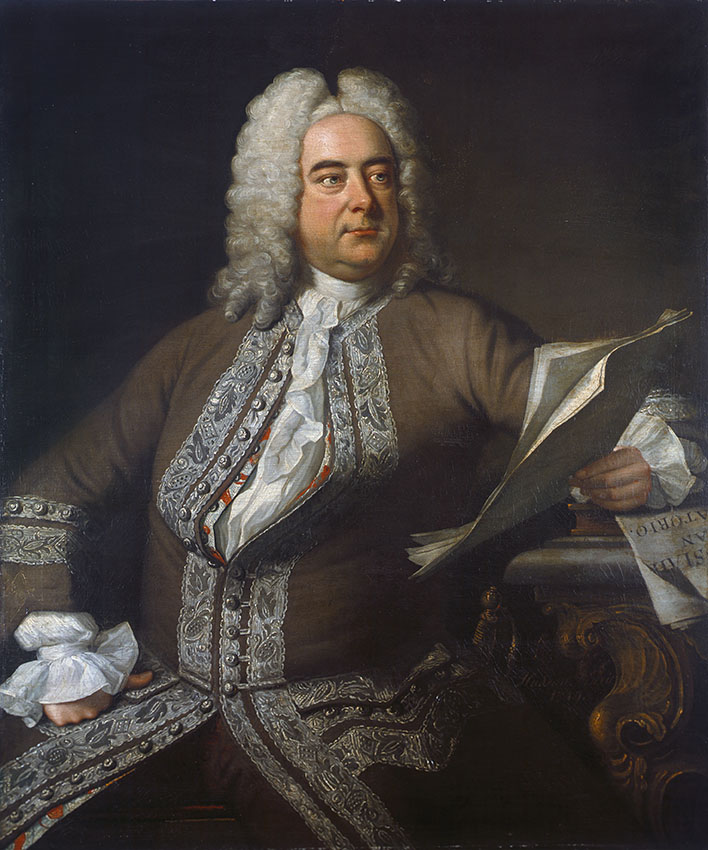
George Frideric Handel

An indigenous style did not flourish in Germany, and the structure of Italian opera was generally followed. However, the singspiel emerged as a minor genre of comic tone, analogous to the French opéra-comique and the Spanish zarzuela, which alternated dialogue with music and song. The earliest example was Croesus by Reinhard Keiser (1711).

Georg Philipp Telemann performed operas with arias in Italian and recitatives in German. A precocious musician, he composed his first opera at the age of twelve. He was a composer, organist, conductor and creator of the first musical magazine in history, Der getreue Musikmeister. However, his work fell into oblivion and was not recovered until the early 20th century, although his operas today are not performed on the operatic theater circuit. It is estimated that he composed about fifty operas, although only nine are preserved, including Germanicus (1704), Pimpinone (1725) and Don Quichotte auf der Hochzeit des Camacho (Don Quixote at Camacho's Wedding, 1761).

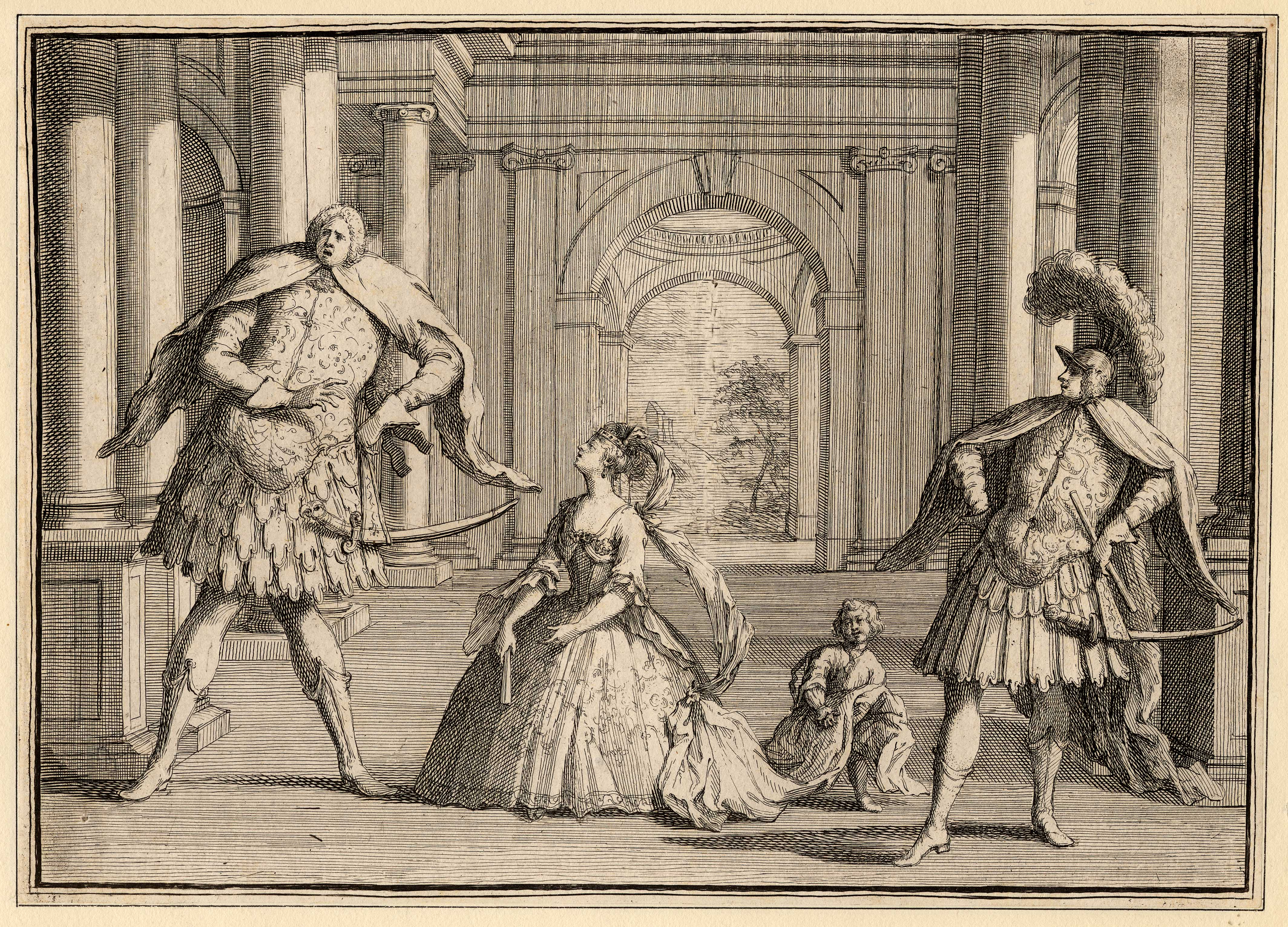
Caricature of a performance of Flavio by Handel, with singers Senesino, Cuzzoni and Berenstadt

One of the best operatists of the time was Georg Friedrich Händel. A disciple of Friedrich Wilhelm Zachow, in 1703 he settled in Hamburg, where he composed his first opera, Almira, in 1705, at the age of twenty. In 1707 he traveled to Rome, Venice and Florence, the latter city where he premiered his first opera, Rodrigo. Despite his origins, he wrote all his operas in Italian. In 1708 he traveled to Naples, where he made contact with the notable operatic school of that city. In 1709 he premiered Agrippina in Venice, which was a great success. In his works he brought together Italian and French influences, without lacking his Germanic character. Shortly thereafter, he returned to his homeland, where he became the chapel master to Prince Elector George of Hanover, who in 1714 became George I of Great Britain. In 1712 he settled in England, where he developed most of his work, and where he was conductor of the orchestra of the Royal Academy of Music, which was based at the King's Theatre. He composed forty-two operas, usually solemn and grandiose works, where he usually incorporated choirs, though not ballets like the French. He had a preference for heroic plots and his protagonists were usually heroes of antiquity, whether historical or mythological, such as Theseus, Jerxes, Alexander the Great, Scipio or Julius Caesar. His works include: Rinaldo (1711), Amadigi di Gaula (1715), Giulio Cesare in Egitto (1724), Tamerlano (1724), Rodelinda (1725), Admeto (1727), Tolomeo (1728), Orlando (1733), Ariodante (1735), Alcina (1735), Serse (1738) and Imeneo (1740). His regular librettist was Nicola Francesco Haym.

"Ombra mai fù", aria from the opera Serse by Handel, performed by Enrico Caruso in 1920

Other exponents were Johann Adolph Hasse, Johann Joseph Fux and Johann Mattheson. Hasse studied in Naples with Scarlatti. His first opera was Antioco (1721), at the age of twenty-two, followed by Sesostrate (1726) and La sorella amante (1729). In 1730 he premiered in Venice Artaserse, which was innovative for its expressive contrasts that allowed a great showcasing of the singers. That year he was appointed director of the Dresden Opera, where he was one of the main promoters of opera seria. He left some seventy operas. Fux was the author of eighteen operas, mostly with librettos by Pietro Pariati, though also by Zeno and Metastasio. His greatest success was Costanza e Fortezza (1723), premiered in Prague at the coronation of Emperor Charles VI as king of Bohemia. Mattheson was a tenor as well as a composer. He worked as an assistant to other operatists, including Keiser, before composing his own. In 1715 he was appointed director of music at Hamburg Cathedral. His works include Cleopatra (1704).

=== Other countries ===
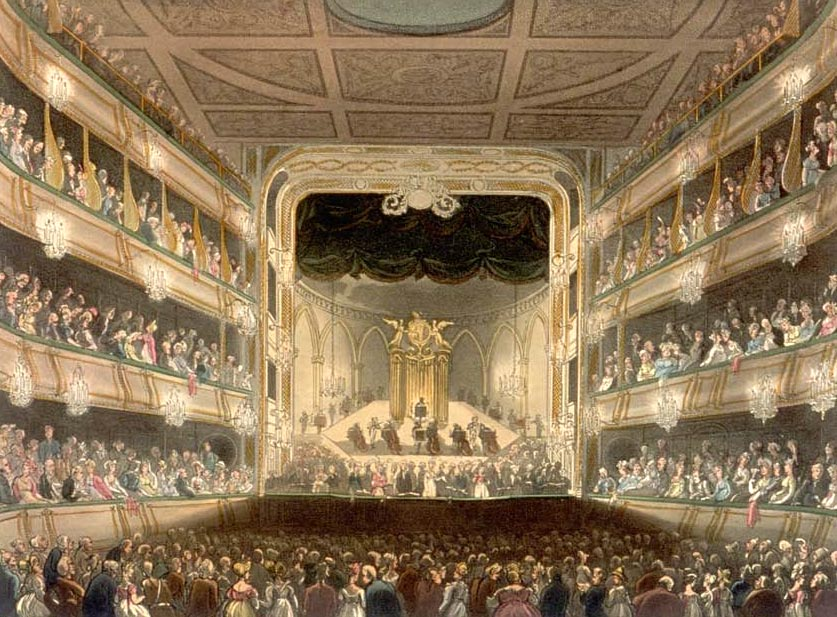
Theatre Royal (Covent Garden) in London

In England, too, no national school emerged and the public remained faithful to Italian opera. In 1707, an attempt at English opera, Rosamund, by the musician Thomas Clayton and the writer Joseph Addison, was a resounding failure. In the same year, the opera Semele by John Eccles—with a libretto by William Congreve—was not even premiered. Just as in Germany works with recitative in German and arias in Italian were produced, in England the introduction of the English language did not take off either. Thus, the operatic scene was largely dominated by Handel, along with the premiere of Italian productions. In 1732 the Theatre Royal—also known as Covent Garden—in London, the country's main operatic center, rebuilt in 1809 and 1858; since 1892 it has been called the Royal Opera House.

However, as time went on, audiences began to tire of Händelian operas, which explains the success of The Beggar's Opera (The Beggar's Opera, 1728), a sort of Italian anti-opera with music by Johann Christoph Pepusch and libretto by John Gay, a reaction to Händel's somewhat pompous solemnity. This work inaugurated the ballad opera genre, equivalent to the operetta, the Spanish zarzuela or the German singspiel. They were works based on ballads and short songs, with folk dances and melodies. There also emerged the afterpieces, short works performed during the intermissions of theatrical works, in the style of the Italian intermezzi. Some exponents were Samuel Arnold (The Maid of the Mill, 1765), Charles Dibdin (The Waterman, 1774), Stephen Storace (The Haunted Tower, 1789; The Pirates, 1792) and William Shield (The Magic Cavern, 1784; The Enchanted Castle, 1786; The Crusade, 1790).

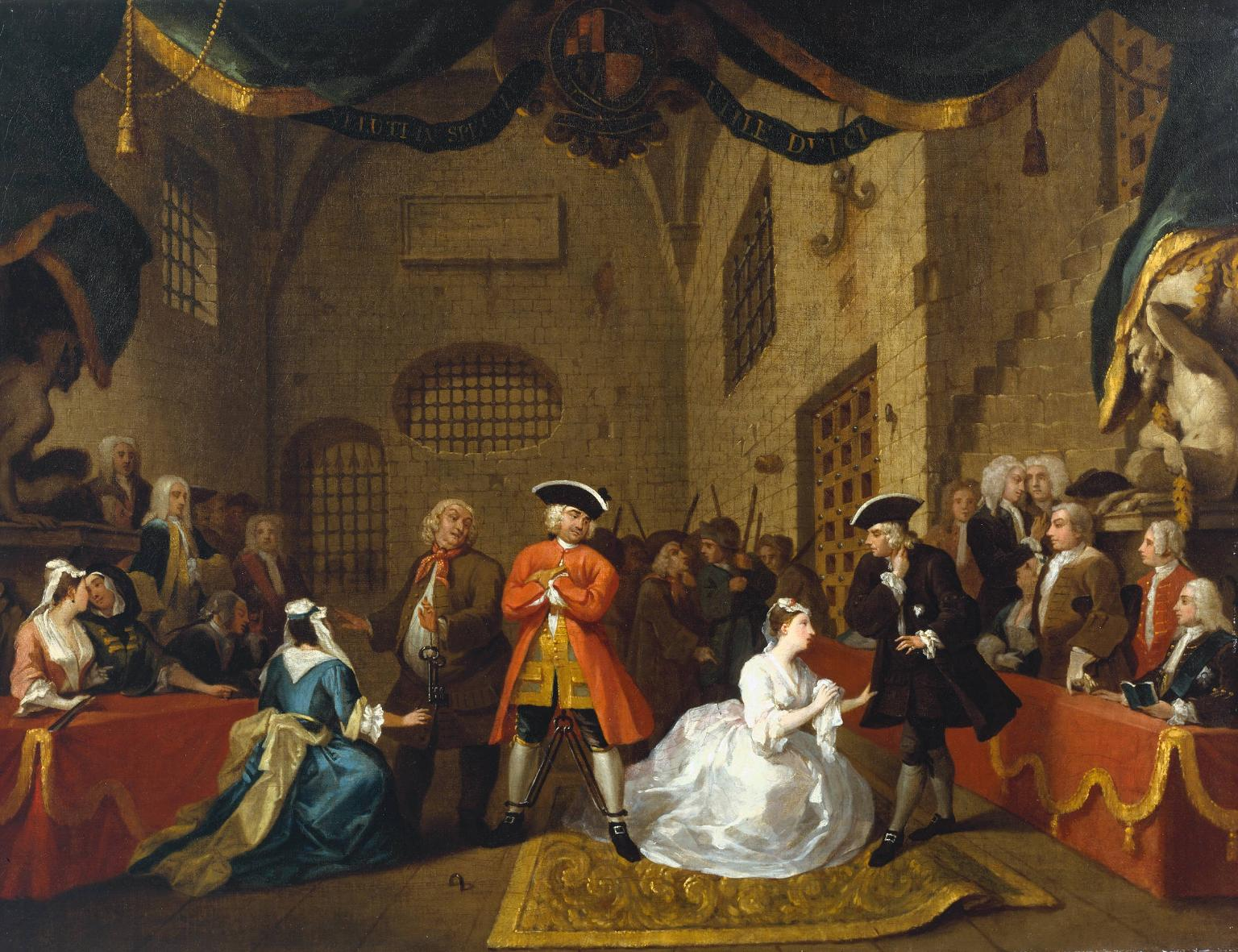
The Beggar's Opera, painting by William Hogarth

A last attempt at English opera was led by Thomas Arne, composer and producer. He was the author of the comic opera Rosamond (1733) and the serious Comus (1738), as well as the masquerade Alfred (1740), whose song Rule, Britannia! became an English patriotic anthem. He subsequently composed Artaxerxes (1762)—in English—and L'Olimpiade (1765)—in Italian—both with libretto by Pietro Metastasio.

In Denmark, King Federick V protected opera and welcomed the Italian composer Giuseppe Sarti, author of the first opera in Danish: Gam og Signe (1756). Prominent among Danish composers was Friedrich Ludwig Æmilius Kunzen, author of Holger Danske (Holger the Dane, 1789), while the German Johann Abraham Peter Schulz introduced the singspiel genre in Danish (Høstgildet [Harvest Festival], 1790).

In Spain, during the reign of Felipe V, numerous Italian singers and composers settled in the country, among them the famous Farinelli. Among the works produced in these years are Júpiter y Anfitrión (1720), by Giacomo Facco and libretto by José de Cañizares; and El rapto de las sabinas (1735), by Francesco Corselli. Fernando VI and Bárbara de Braganza were lovers of Italian opera, and favored the stay of composers such as Francesco Coradini and Giovanni Battista Mele.

With the coming to power of the Bourbons zarzuela declined, due to the preference of the new rulers for Italian opera. However, during the reign of Carlos III it briefly resurfaced, due to the rejection of Italian opera caused by popular discontent with the monarch's Italian ministers. Of particular note was the sainetista Ramón de la Cruz, who defined in his works the so-called casticismo madrileño: among his works it is worth mentioning Las segadoras de Vallecas (1768), with music by Antonio Rodríguez de Hita. Another exponent was José de Nebra, author of Viento es la dicha de amor (1743) and Where there is violence, there is no guilt (1744), among others.

In Barcelona, the marqués de la Mina encouraged opera and sponsored the installation of an Italian company in the Teatro de la Santa Cruz, in which worked the composer Giuseppe Scolari, who premiered some operas such as Alessandro nell'Indie (1750) and Didone abbandonata (1752). There was also a local composer, Josep Duran, author of Antigono (1760) and Temistocle (1762).

During this period there was also the genre of the tonadilla, some works of lyrical-theatrical character and of satirical and picaresque sign, which were represented in the theatrical intermissions along with sainetes or entremeses. It occurred mainly in the second half of the 18th century. The first work of this genre was Una mesonera y un arriero (1757), by Luis de Misón. Other authors were Antonio Guerrero, Blas de Laserna, Pablo Esteve and Fernando Ferandiere.

In Portugal, opera was supported by King John V, who favored the installation of Italian composers, such as Domenico Scarlatti. Among the Portuguese composers, it is worth mentioning Francisco António de Almeida, author of Italian operas: La pazienzia di Socrate (1733) and La Spinalba, ovvero Il vecchio matto (1739).

== Galant music and Gluckian reform ==
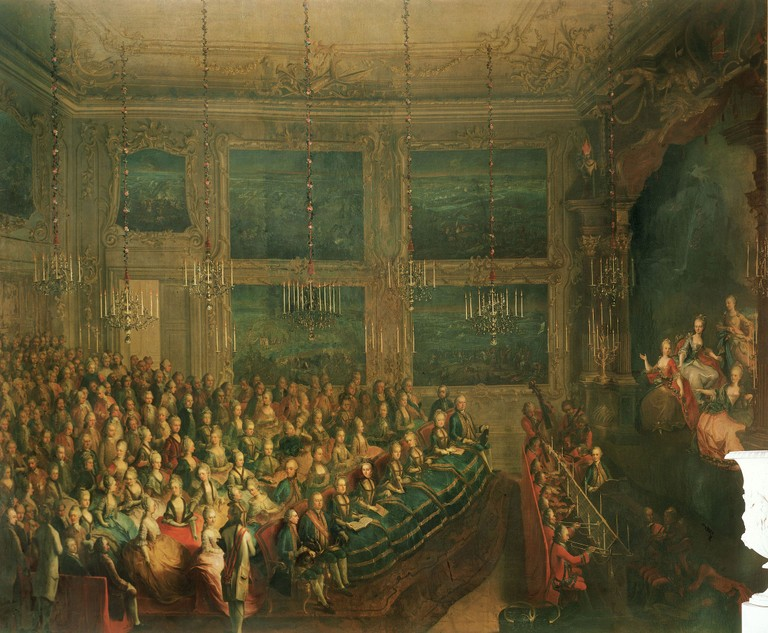
Performance of Il parnaso confuso by Christoph Willibald Gluck (1765), Schönbrunn Palace, Vienna

In the second third of the 18th century some voices began to emerge critical of opera seria, which was considered stultified and too much geared to vocal flourishes. The first criticisms came from some writings such as Il teatro alla moda by Benedetto Marcello (1720) or Saggio sull'opera by Francesco Algarotti (1755). It was the time of the rococo, which in music gave the so-called galant music, calmer than the baroque, lighter and simpler, gentle, decorative, melodic and sentimental. The taste for contrast disappeared and the sonorous gradation was sought (crescendo, diminuendo). In the so-called Mannheim School, symphonic music developed, with the first large modern orchestra (40 instruments), an initiative of the elector Charles Theodore of Wittelsbach. Its main representative, Johann Stamitz, is considered the first conductor.

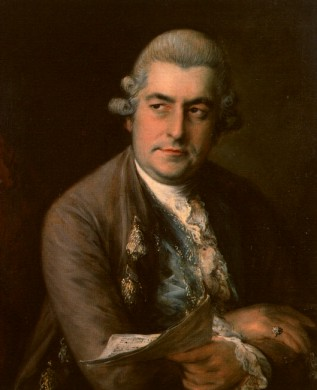
Johann Christian Bach

The main center of galant music was the Germanic area (Germany and Austria), where it is known as Empfindsamer Stil ("sentimental style"). In Germany, it had an early precedent in the late work of Telemann and Mattheson. Its main representative was Johann Christian Bach, probably the most gifted of Johann Sebastian Bach's sons. He lived for a time in Italy, where he converted to Catholicism and married an opera singer, a fact that would undoubtedly influence him to approach a genre that neither his father nor his brothers had treated. With a great mastery of instrumental music, he combined the simplicity and clarity of Italian music with Germanic precision. He later settled in England, where he was director of the Theatre Royal in London. His work influenced Mozart, whom he even gave lessons to when the latter traveled to London at the age of eight. His works include: Artaserse (1760), Catone in Utica (1761), Alessandro nell'Indie (1762), Orione (1762), Lucio Silla (1775), La clemenza di Scipione (1778) and Amadis de Gaule (1779). Another exponent was Carl Heinrich Graun, chapel master to Frederick II of Prussia. His opera Cleopatra e Cesare opened the Staatsoper Unter den Linden in Berlin in 1742. King Frederick himself wrote the libretto for his opera Montezuma (1755). Generally, his operas followed the Italian style, influenced by Scarlatti. It is worth mentioning that Frederick II's sister, Wilhelmina of Prussia, was a composer of an opera (Argenore, 1740) and promoted the creation of the Markgräfliches Theater in Bayreuth.

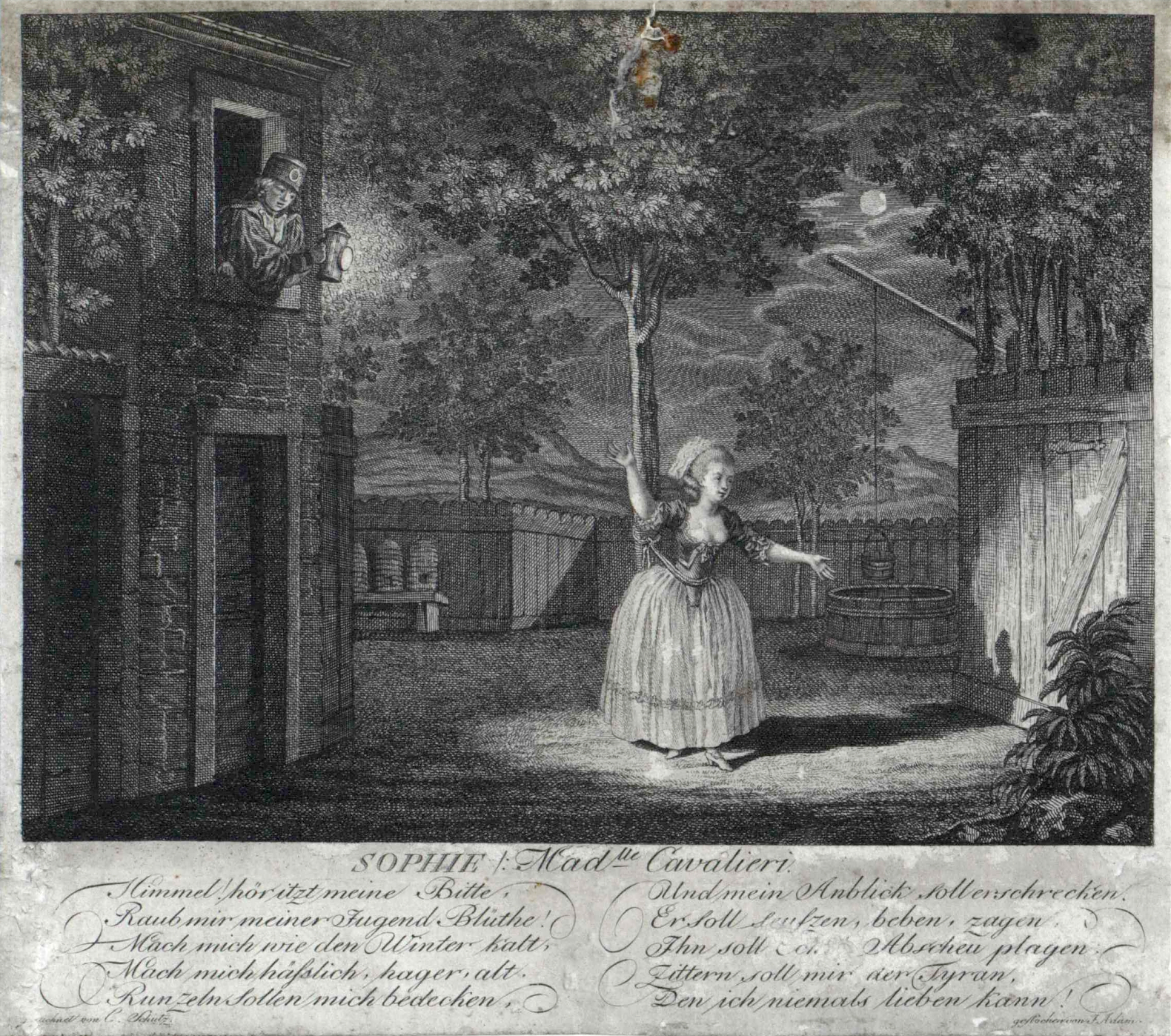
Caterina Cavalieri in the performance of Die Bergknappen (The Miners), by Ignaz Umlauf (1779)

In Austria, Florian Leopold Gassmann, of Czech origin, composed several operas – preferably buffas – for Empress Maria Theresa: L'amore artigiano (1767), La notte critica (1768), La contessina (1770), Il filosofo innamorato (1771), Le pescatrici (1771). Ignaz Holzbauer was one of the first Germanic composers to compose operas with recitative instead of dialogue, such as Günther von Schwarzburg (1776), a work admired by Mozart. The Czech Josef Mysliveček studied in Italy, where he premiered most of his works: Il Bellerofonte (1767), Demofoonte (1775), L'Olimpiade (1778).

In the Germanic sphere was the golden age of singspiel: in 1778, Emperor Joseph II renamed the French Theater in Vienna as Deutsches Nationaltheater (now Burgtheater) and dedicated it to this genre, which premiered with Die Bergknappen (The Miners), by Ignaz Umlauf. The most prominent composers of singspiel were Johann Adam Hiller (Der Teufel ist los [The Devil is on the loose], 1766; Der Jagd [The Hunt], 1770) and Georg Anton Benda (Der Dorfjahrmarkt [The Village Fair], 1775; Romeo und Julie, 1776). Other exponents were: Karl von Ordonez (Diesmal hat der Mann den Willen [This time the decision is man's], 1778), Johann André (Erwin und Elmire, 1775), Christian Gottlob Neefe (Adelheit von Veltheim, 1780), Carl Ditters von Dittersdorf (Doktor und Apotheker [Physician and Pharmacist], 1786), Anton Eberl (Die Marchande des Modes, 1787), Paul Wranitzky (Oberon, König der Elfen [Oberon, King of the Elves], 1789), Johann Friedrich Reichardt (Erwin und Elmire, 1790), Johann Baptist Schenk (Der Dorfbarbier [The Village Barber], 1796) and Wenzel Müller (Die Teufelmühle [The Devil's Mill], 1799).

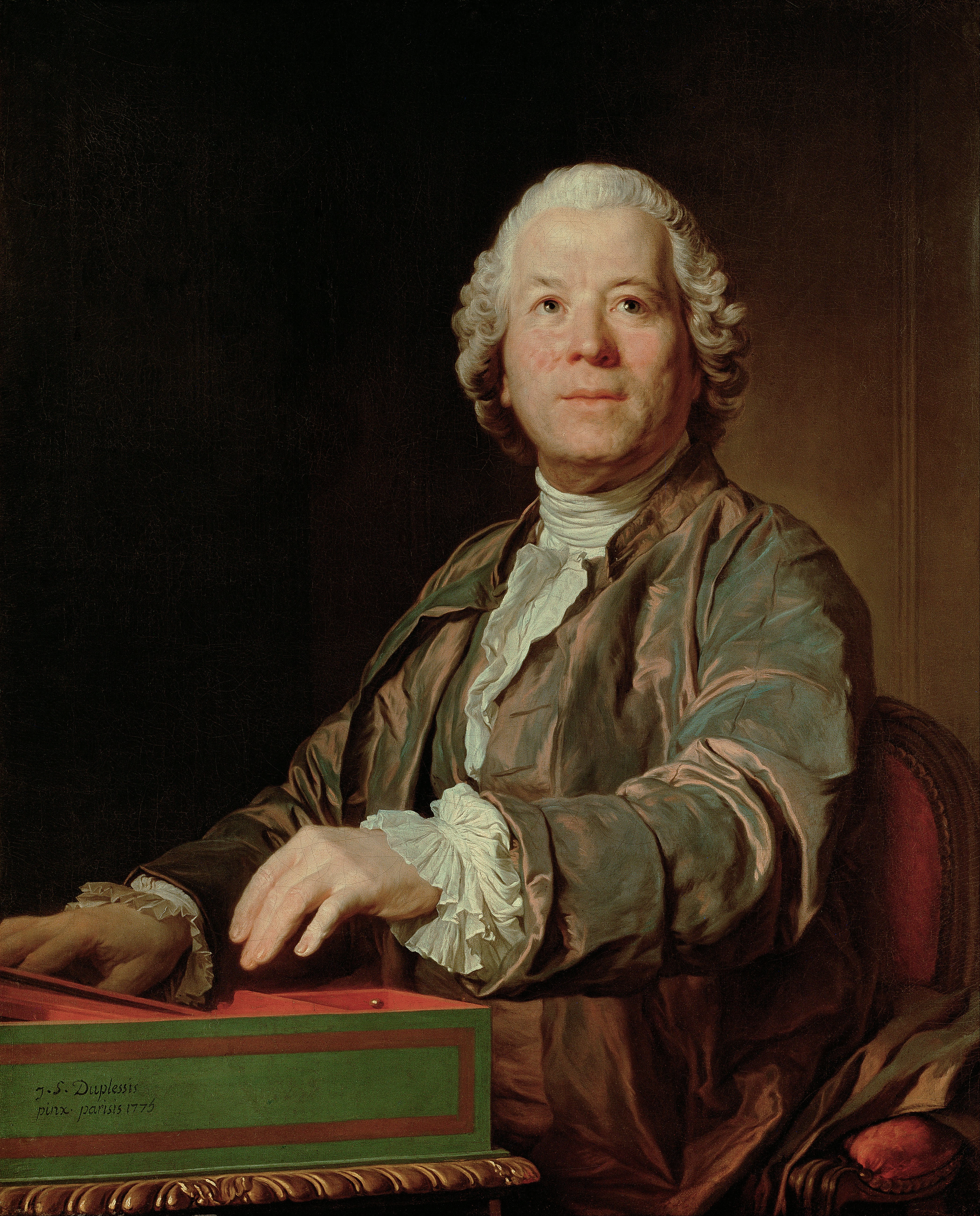
Christoph Willibald Gluck

In France, the galant style was already denoted in the work of Rameau and, more fully, in Joseph Bodin de Boismortier (Les Voyages de l'Amour, 1736; Daphnis et Chloé, 1747) and Jean-Joseph de Mondonville (Daphnis et Alcimadure, 1754).

In Italy, gallant music had less incidence, given the presence of the Venetian and Neapolitan schools. Even so, it is denoted in the work of Niccolò Piccinni, Domenico Scarlatti and Baldassare Galuppi, as well as in Pietro Domenico Paradisi (Alessandro in Persia, 1738; Le muse in gara, 1740; Fetonte 1747; La Forza d'amore, 1751), Giovanni Marco Rutini (I matrimoni in maschera, 1763; L'olandese in Italia, 1765), Felice Alessandri (Ezio, 1767; Adriano in Syria, 1779; Demofoonte, 1783) and Giovanni Battista Martini (Don Chisciotte, 1746).

Dance of the Blessed Spirits, from the opera Orfeo ed Euridice (1762), by Christoph Willibald Gluck

During this period a reform in opera was introduced that pointed to a change of style that would culminate in classicism. Its architect was the Bohemian-Austrian composer Christoph Willibald Gluck. He studied in Milan, where he premiered in 1741 Artaserse, with a libretto by Metastasio. In 1745 he moved to London, where he unsuccessfully sought Händel's support; he therefore settled in Vienna the following year, until 1770, when he settled in Paris. Among the reforms introduced by Gluck were: preeminence of the plot over vocal improvisations, with more truthful characters; austere music, without ornamentation; limitation of recitatives, all with orchestral accompaniment; overture, choir and ballet are integrated into the action of the opera; abolition of the da capo in the arias; music at the service of the text, harmonizing both elements. On the other hand, as opposed to the concept of closed numbers of Italian opera, Gluck introduced the tableau ("tableau"), a scenic concept that turned each act into a dramatic-musical unit encompassing soloists, choir, ensembles and ballets, which formed an organic ensemble scene. This concept was especially developed in 19th-century French opera.

Among his works are: Orfeo ed Euridice (1762), Alceste (1767) and Paride ed Elena (1770), premiered in Vienna; and Iphigénie en Aulide (1774), Armide (1777), Iphigénie en Tauride (1779) and Écho et Narcisse (1779), premiered in Paris. His regular librettist was Ranieri de' Calzabigi. During his stay in France, the so-called quarrel of Gluckists and Piccinnists (1775–1779) arose between supporters of Gluck's reform and supporters of Italian opera. Gluck did not limit himself to his Reform-Opern (renewed opera), but made some comic works in the Italian style, such as L'ivrogne corrigé (The Corrected Beodle, 1760) and La rencontre imprévue (The Unforeseen Encounter, 1764).

== Classicism ==
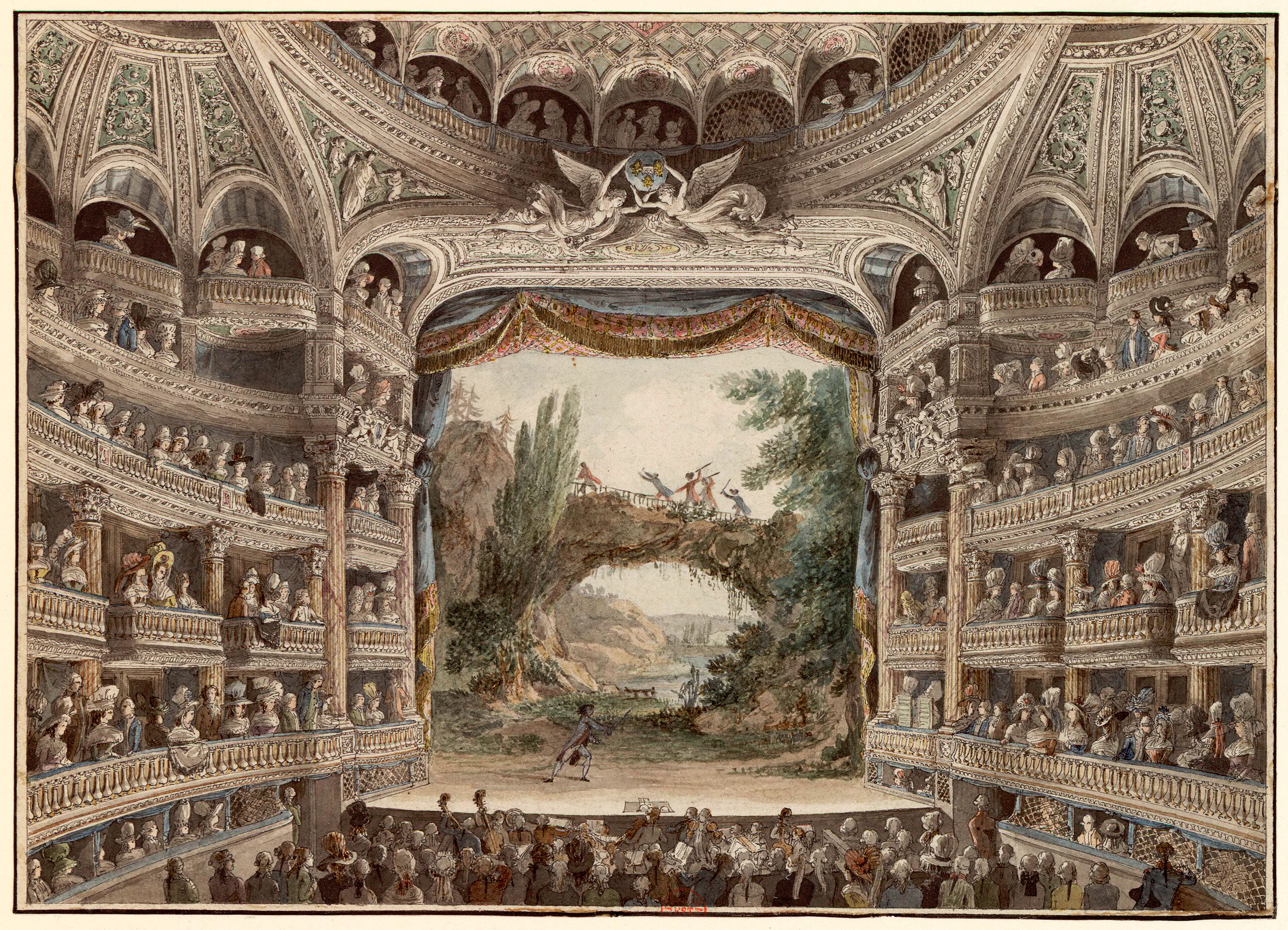
Comédie-Française theatre, Paris (1790)

The classical music—not to be confused with the general concept of "classical music" understood as the vocal and instrumental music of cultured tradition produced from the Middle Ages to the present day— (Note: Although today it is usually generalized as "classical music" the symphonic music of orchestral type, it actually refers to a specific period in the history of music, characterized by classicism, corresponding to the last third of the 18th century and the beginning of the 19th. The term "classical music" first appeared in the Oxford English Dictionary in 1836, where it described the music produced in the previous century. Over time, it came to be synonymous with cultured music or academic music, the opposite of popular music.) it meant between the last third of the 18th century and the beginning of the 19th century the culmination of instrumental forms, consolidated with the definitive structuring of the modern orchestra. Classicism was manifested in the balance and serenity of composition, the search for formal beauty, for perfection, in harmonious and inspiring forms of high values. It sought the creation of a universal musical language, a harmonization between form and musical content. The taste of the public began to be valued, which gave rise to a new way of producing musical works, as well as new forms of patronage.

Opera continued to enjoy great popularity, although it underwent a gradual evolution in accordance with the novelties introduced by classicism. Along with solo voices there were duos, trios, quartets and other ensembles—even a sextet in Le nozze di Figaro by Mozart, as well as choirs, although not as grandiose as the baroque ones. The orchestra was enlarged and instrumental music became increasingly prominent in relation to the vocal line. In 1778 the La Scala Theater of Milan was inaugurated, one of the most famous in the world, with an auditorium of 2800 spectators. Similarly, in 1792 the La Fenice theater in Venice opened, which has also enjoyed great prestige.

The main composers of classicism were Franz Joseph Haydn, Wolfgang Amadeus Mozart and Ludwig van Beethoven. Haydn, considered the father of the symphony, was a great innovator in the field of music. Self-taught, in his youth he played in street bands, until he entered the service of Prince Pál II Antal Esterházy, in whose palace in Eisenstadt he lived for thirty years. He created an orchestra close to the modern one, with a correlation between strings and winds. Haydn gave the symphony the so-called "sonata form", in four movements. Opera was not Haydn's main interest, but he composed several for the Esterházy court, usually comic; today they are not usually in the operatic repertoire. These include: Acide e Galatea (1763), La canterina (1766), Lo speziale (1768), Le pescatrici (1770), L'infedeltà delusa (1773), L'incontro improvviso (1775), Il mondo della luna (1777), La vera costanza (1779), L'isola disabitata (1779), La fedeltà premiata (1781), Orlando paladino (1782), Armida (1784) and L'anima del filosofo (1791).

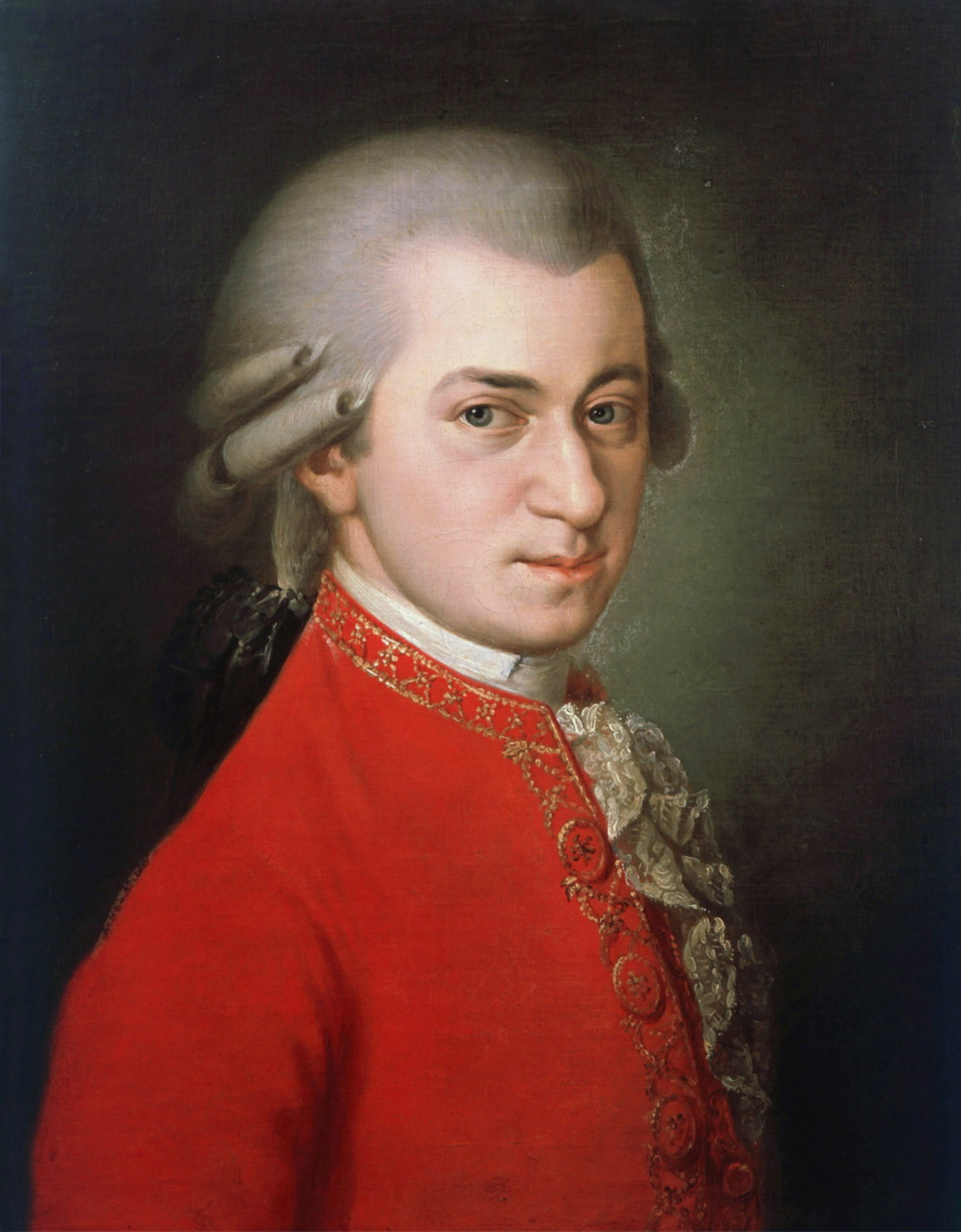
Wolfgang Amadeus Mozart

The main exponent of classicism was the Austrian Wolfgang Amadeus Mozart. He was a child prodigy, who toured Europe with his father between the ages of six and fourteen, becoming acquainted with the main musical currents of the time: Italian and French opera, Gallant music, Mannheim school. In his native Salzburg, he performed in 1767 the sacred singspiel Die Schuldigkeit des ersten Gebots (The Obligation of the First Commandment), at the age of only eleven. That same year he performed for the university an operetta in Latin, Apollo et Hyacinthus. The following year he composed the singspiel Bastien und Bastienne, a parody of Le devin du village by Jean-Jacques Rousseau. That year he received a commission from the grand duke of Tuscany Peter Leopold I – future Holy Roman Emperor Leopold II – for an Italian opera buffa, and produced La finta semplice. During a stay in Naples he composed Mitridate, re di Ponto (1770), his first serious opera, which reaped a notable success, and featured a richer and more elegant orchestration than the Italian operas of the time. In the following two years he composed two serenatas, operettas to be performed in a salon: Ascanio in Alba (1771) and Il sogno di Scipione (1772), the latter with libretto by Metastasio. That year he produced Lucio Silla, of Gluckian influence. In 1775 he received a commission from Munich and produced La finta giardiniera, of comic tone, still in the Baroque style. That year he produced Il re pastore, a pastoral serenade. Again in Salzburg, between 1779 and 1780 he began Zaide, a singspiel which he left unfinished. Idomeneo, re di Creta (1781) was a new commission from Munich. This work marked his entry into musical maturity and his gradual abandonment of the baroque.

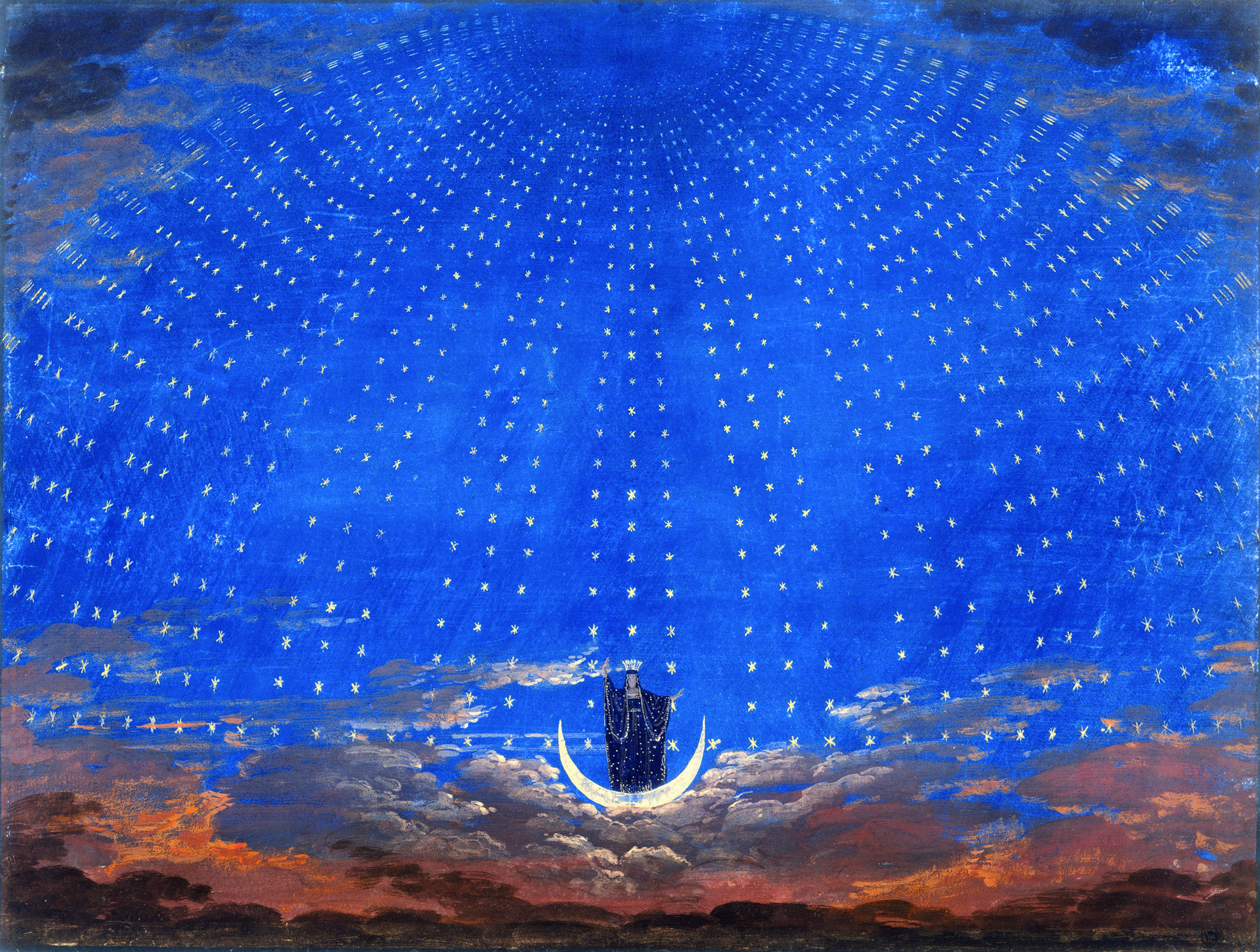
Königin der Nacht (The Queen of the Night) in an 1815 production of the opera Die Zauberflöte (The Magic Flute), by Wolfgang Amadeus Mozart

After the success of Idomeneo he settled in Vienna, where he was commissioned by Emperor Joseph II to write an opera in German, given the pan-Germanist policy of the monarch. In 1782 he premiered at the Burgtheater Die Entführung aus dem Serail (The Abduction from the Seraglio), set in a Turkish harem. This work broke completely with the baroque style, especially by breaking with the succession of arias and the inclusion of real characters, who express their feelings. Depending on the plot he introduced various musical styles, such as folk music to accompany the maid, or passages with Turkish music, characterized by its strident percussion. He employed a denser orchestra, with more wind instruments. He also introduced an aria in two parts, one slower and one faster (cabaletta). At the end he introduced a vaudeville, a scene that brings together all the characters on stage, whose text makes a synthesis of what happened in the play. (Note: With the term vaudeville there are two concepts: as seen when talking about opéra-comique, it is a type of song with refrain that used to use popular melodies; on the other hand, as in the case of Mozartian The Abduction from the Seraglio, it was a final scene where all the characters of the play were grouped together. Menéndez Torrellas (2013, p. 157).)

Overture to Don Giovanni (1787), by Wolfgang Amadeus Mozart

After two unfinished buffa operas in 1783 (L'oca del Cairo and Lo sposo deluso), it was not until three years later that he received other commissions in 1786: Der Schauspieldirektor (The Theater Director) and Le Nozze di Figaro (The Marriage of Figaro). The latter was an opera buffa with libretto by Lorenzo da Ponte, based on Le mariage de Figaro by Pierre-Augustin de Beaumarchais. In it he showed his mastery of the vocal ensemble, introducing a sextet in act three. He also showed admirable psychological skill in the treatment of the characters, as well as in the various emotional qualities of the instruments (clarinet for love, oboe for grief, bassoon for irony). The following year he produced Il dissoluto punito, ossia il Don Giovanni, also with libretto by Da Ponte, based equally on Tirso de Molina's The Trickster of Seville and Molière's Dom Juan, commissioned by the Prague State Theater. In this work he combined tragedy and comedy in equal parts. In 1790 he produced Così fan tutte (Thus do they all), his last collaboration with Da Ponte, which was considered frivolous and immoral. His last two operas are from the year of his death (1791): La clemenza di Tito, opera seria with libretto by Metastasio, and Die Zauberflöte (The Magic Flute), a singspiel with libretto by Emanuel Schikaneder. The latter mixed a fairy tale with a masonic allegory, and was one of his most accomplished works.

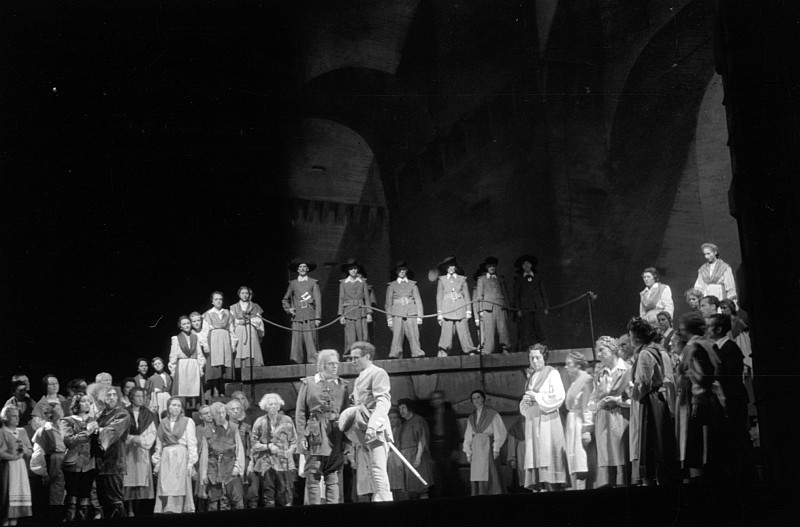
Performance of the opera Fidelio by Ludwig van Beethoven, Deutsche Oper Berlin (1945)

Another outstanding composer of classicism was Ludwig van Beethoven, halfway to Romanticism. In 1803 he attempted an opera, Vestas Feuer, with a libretto by Emanuel Schikaneder, but the project remained unfinished. Two years later he made what would be his only opera, Fidelio (1805), a singspiel of political-moral character, a drama of romantic style, based on Léonore, ou l'amour conjugale by Jean-Nicolas Bouilly. In this work he denoted the influence of Mozart, especially Così fan tutte and Die Zauberflöte. Due to the little experience he had in the field of opera, the music of this work was symphonic, with an instrumentation so dense that it demanded great efforts from the singers. He later made other attempts to compose operas, such as a Macbeth (1808–1811) or a fairy tale entitled Melusine (1823–1824), which he left incomplete.

In the Germanic sphere mention should likewise be made of: Franz Seraph von Destouches (Die Thomasnacht [The Night of Thomas], 1792; Das Mißverständnis [The Misunderstanding], 1805), Anton Reicha (Argene, regina di Granata, 1806; Natalie, 1816), Joseph Weigl (La principessa d'Amalfi, 1794; Die Schweizerfamilie [The Swiss Family], 1809) and Peter von Winter (Das unterbochene Opferfest [The Interrupted Offering Party], 1796; Der Sturm [The Tempest], 1798; Maometto, 1817).

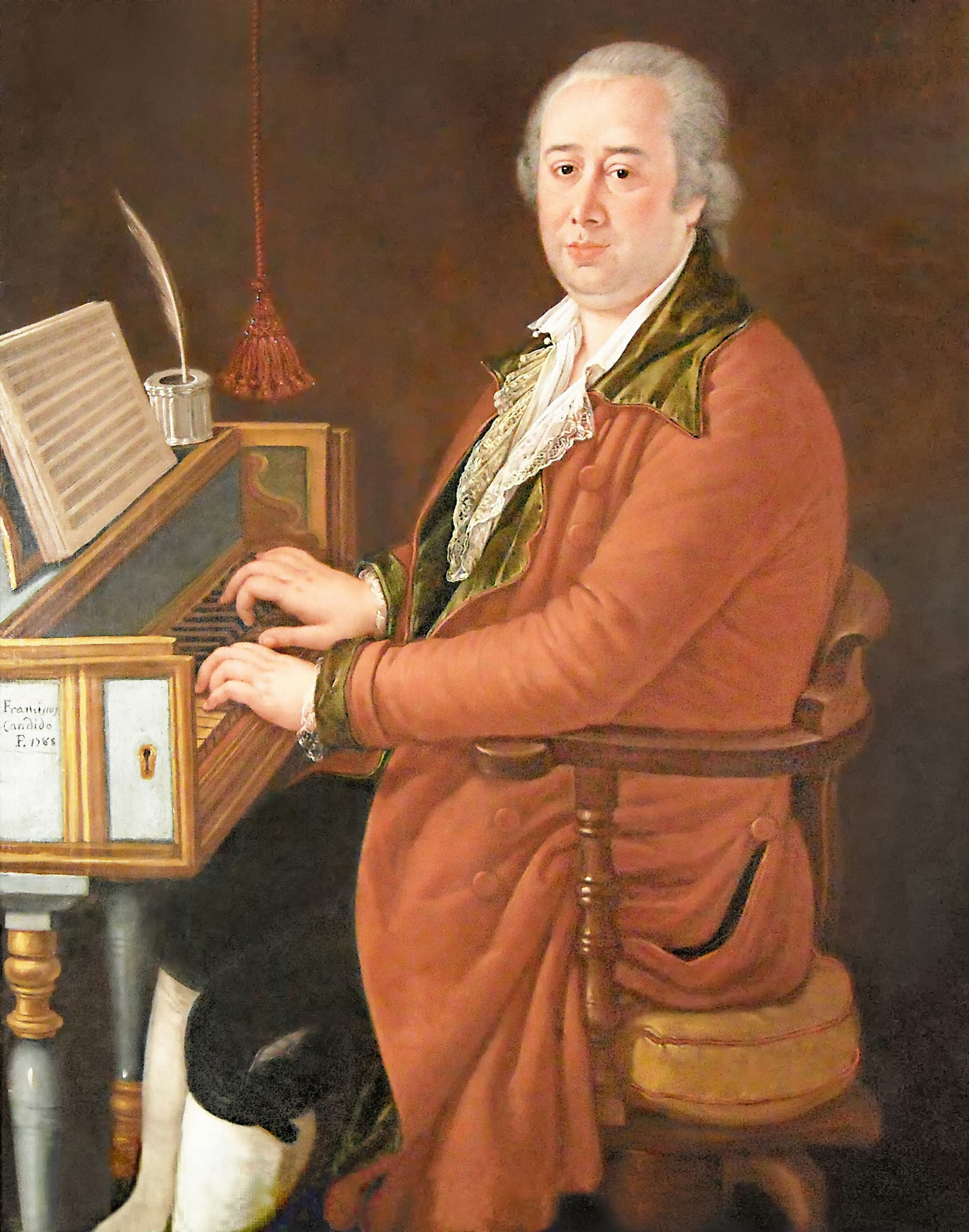
Domenico Cimarosa

In Italy, the work of Giovanni Paisiello and Domenico Cimarosa was outstanding. Paisiello started in opera buffa (L'idolo cinese, 1767). In 1776 he was invited to St. Petersburg, where he composed Lucinda ed Armidoro (1777), Nitteti (1777) and Il barbiere di Siviglia (1782), on Beaumarchais's play, which would also later be versioned by Rossini. In 1784 he returned to Vienna, where he composed Il re Teodoro in Venezia and, soon after, was appointed chapel master to King Ferdinand IV of Naples, for whom he composed his greatest success Nina, o sia La pazza per amore (1789). He composed about eighty operas, in serious and buffo genre, although the latter more dramatic than usual, thus helping to prestige it. Cimarosa was a prolific composer, who by the age of thirty-five had composed fifteen operas, when in 1787 he was appointed maestro di cappella in St. Petersburg, where he premiered La vergine del sole (1788) and La Cleopatra (1789). In 1791 he was appointed chapel master in Vienna, where the following year he reaped his greatest success with Il matrimonio segreto. His final output was some sixty operas, in which he denoted great vital intensity and melodic warmth.

Antonio Salieri was a pupil of Florian Gassmann, who took him to Vienna in 1766, when he was sixteen. At the age of twenty he composed Le donne letterate (1770), which was a great success, so that in 1774 he was appointed court composer to Emperor Joseph II. In 1784 he was appointed director of the Paris Opera, where he succeeded Gluck. Here he composed several operas in the Gluckian style: Les Danaïdes (1784) and Tarare (1787). In 1788 he was appointed chapel master of the Viennese court, in charge of Italian opera. He composed about thirty operas, both serious and buffas, among which stand out: La fiera di Venezia (1772) and Falstaff ossia Le tre burle (1799). He enjoyed great success during his lifetime, but after his death his popularity declined.

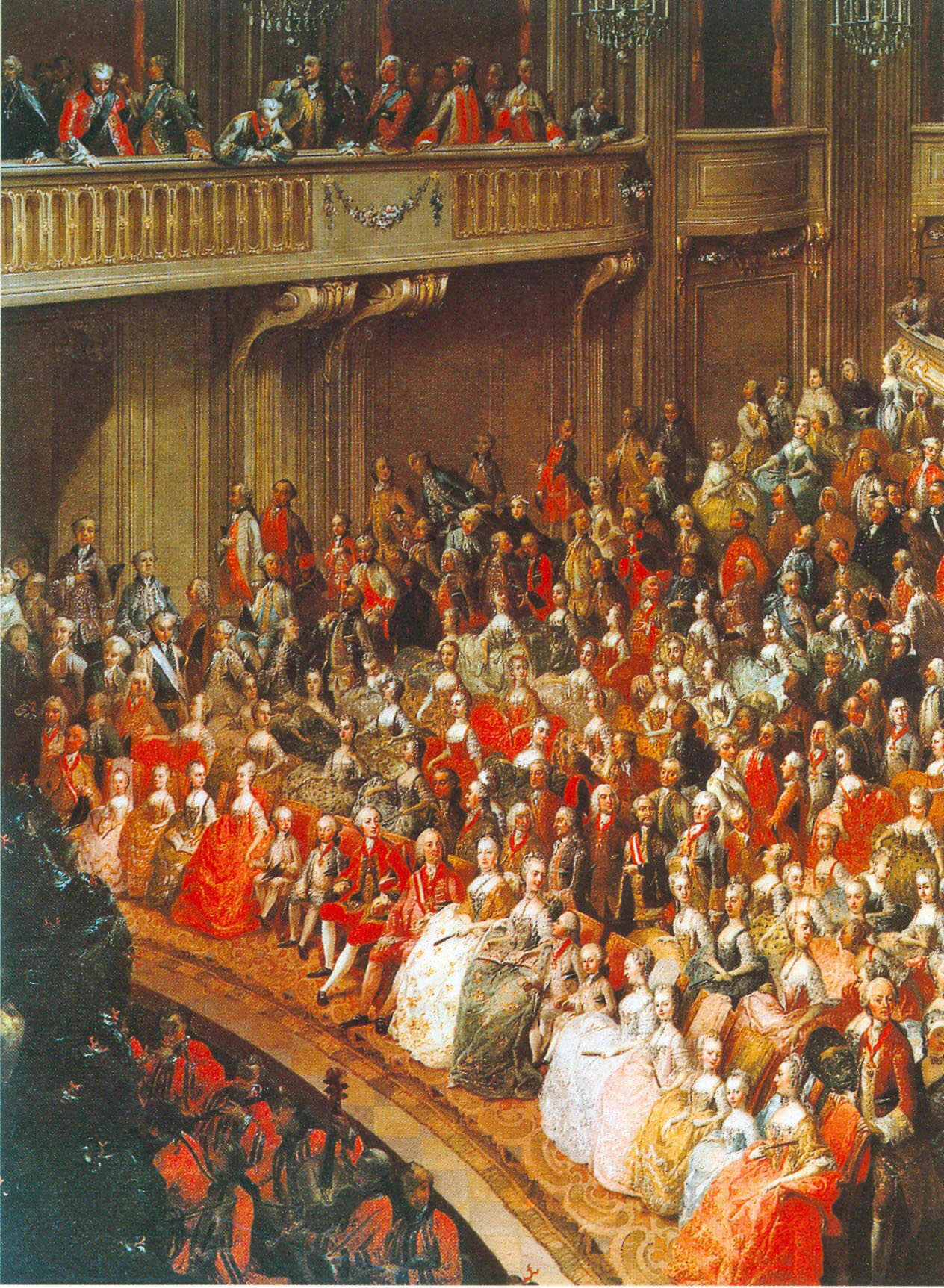
Maria Theresa and her family at the Vienna Court Opera in the Hofburg, Vienna, 1763

Nicola Antonio Zingarelli was the last great representative of the Neapolitan school. His first success was Montezuma (1781), which he premiered at the Teatro San Carlo and was later performed by Haydn in Esterháza. He made buffa operas (Il mercato di Monfregoso, 1792; La secchia rapita, 1793) and serious ones (Artaserse, 1793; Giulietta e Romeo, 1796; Oedipus at Colonus, 1802).

Other exponents were Gaetano Andreozzi (Giulio Cesare, 1789; La principessa filosofa, 1794), Francesco Bianchi (Il Gran Cid, 1773; La vilanella rapita, 1783; La vendetta di Nino, 1790; Ines de Castro, 1794), Valentino Fioravanti (Le cantatrici villane, 1798), Giuseppe Nicolini (Artaserse, 1795; La clemenza di Tito, 1797; Il trionfo del bel sesso, 1799; Il geloso sincerato, 1804; Traiano in Dacia, 1807), Ferdinando Paër (Griselda, 1796; Camilla, 1799; Achille, 1801; Leonora, 1804; Le Maître de chapelle, 1821), Silvestro Palma (La pietra simpatica, 1795) and Angelo Tarchi (Le disgrazie fortunate, 1781; Il guerriero immaginario, 1783).

Opera houses like The Bourgeoisie of Perugia were founded in the late 18th century. Specifically The Bourgeoisie of Perugia was founded in 1781. In this case, different working classes built their own opera houses to mimic the other. These were meant to "enshrine a new morality of 'honest pleasure and love of virtue". The bourgeoisie and noble families wanted to establish a cultural hub that reflected their rising presence. On top of this the opera house was founded to combat a political struggle with the Perugian nobility. This nobility had recently restored their own theatre so this was a countermove by the two families.

At this time emerged in Italy the genre of the farsa, a variant of the opera buffa of smaller format and generally fanciful plot, unrealistic. Cimarosa composed some farces, such as I matrimoni in ballo (1776) and L'impresario in angustie (1786). Some of its main exponents were: Giuseppe Farinelli (Teresa e Claudio, 1801; Pamela, 1802), Pietro Generali (Pamela nubile, 1804) and Giuseppe Mosca (I tre mariti, 1811). It developed until the beginning of the 19th century, when, with the advent of Romanticism, it virtually disappeared, although Rossini, Donizetti and Mayr still produced some farce.

France experienced a period of transition, as the atmosphere generated by the French Revolution favored a certain pre-romanticism in the French lyric genre. Notable in this period are Pierre Gaveaux (Léonore, ou l'amour conjugal, 1798) and Rodolphe Kreutzer (Lodoïska, 1791; Astianax, 1801; Aristippe, 1808; Abel, 1809).

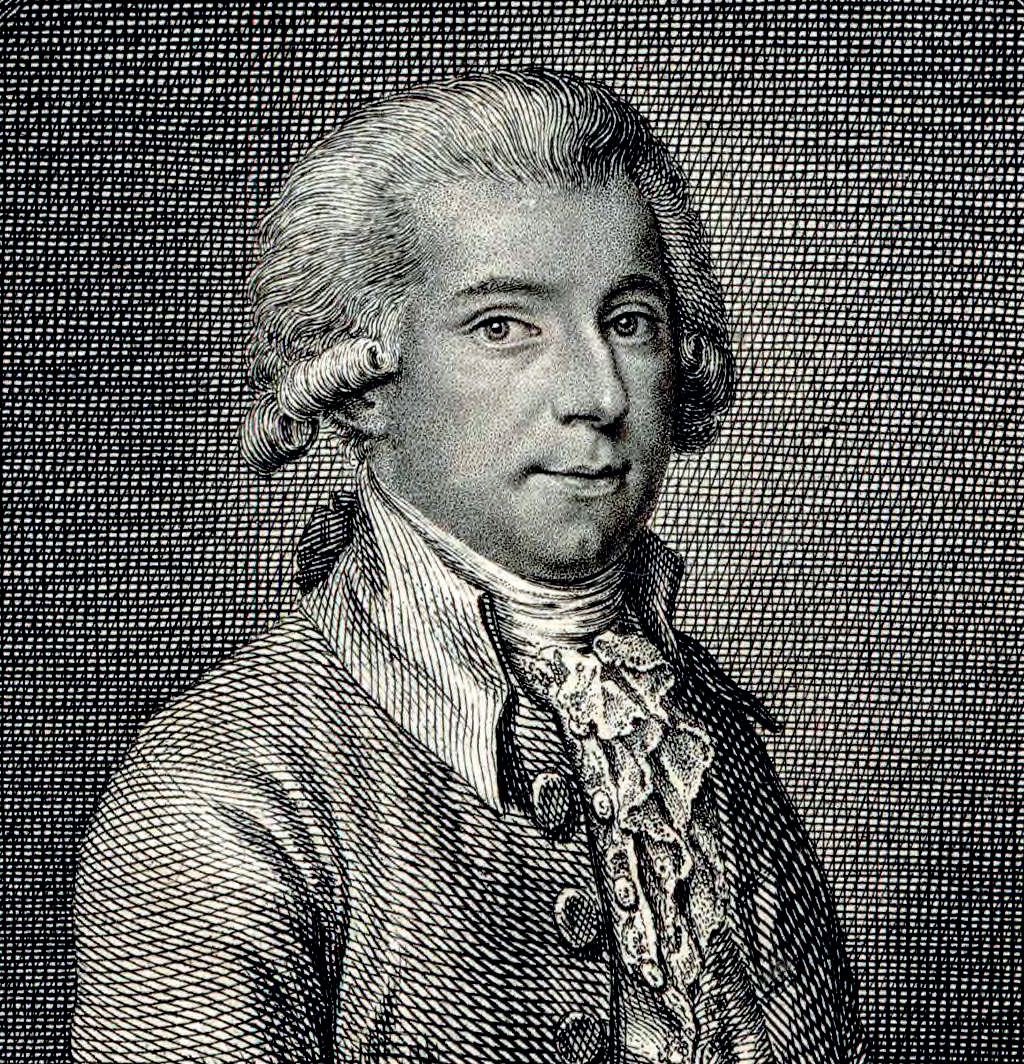
Vicente Martín y Soler

In Spain, the figure of Vicente Martín y Soler stood out internationally. He settled in Italy, where he composed serious and buffa operas, which stood out for the grace of their characters and their beautiful melodies. He was invited to Vienna, where he composed three operas with libretto by Lorenzo da Ponte: Il burbero di buon cuore (1786), Una cosa rara, ossia bellezza ed onestà (1786) and L'arbore di Diana (1787). The most successful, Una cosa rara, displaced Mozart's Le Nozze di Figaro. In 1787 he was appointed court composer to Catherine II of Russia in St. Petersburg. Mention should also be made of Juan Crisóstomo de Arriaga, a child prodigy nicknamed the Spanish Mozart. At the age of thirteen he composed the opera Los esclavos felices (1820), but unfortunately died of consumption at the age of twenty. Fernando Sor premiered in Barcelona his opera in Italian Telemaco nell'isola di Calipso (1797). He later settled in France, where he excelled as a composer of guitar music. Carles Baguer, organist of Barcelona Cathedral, was the author of La principessa filosofa (1791).

In Portugal, he stood out at this time Marcos António de Fonseca Portugal. He began with short operas in Portuguese, such as A castanheira (1787). In 1792 he settled in Naples, where he performed serious and buffa operas: Cinna (1793), La confusione nata della somiglianza (1793), La vedova raggiratrice (1794), Lo spazzacamino principe (1794), Le donne cambiate (1797), Fernando nel Messico (1797).

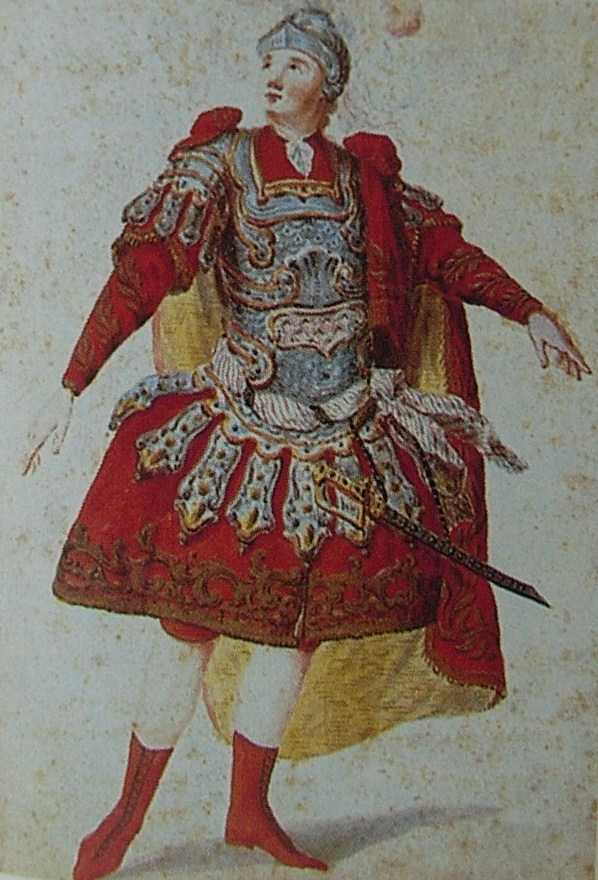
Anton Raaff in the role of Idomeneo

In Russia, a taste for opera began at this time at the court of the tsars, thanks especially to the support of Empress Catherine II, who brought numerous composers to St. Petersburg, such as Baldassare Galuppi, Tommaso Traetta, Giovanni Paisiello, Domenico Cimarosa, Giuseppe Sarti and Vicente Martín y Soler. The first opera written in Russian was by an Italian, Francesco Araja, author of Tsefal i Prokris (Cephalus and Procris, 1755). Vasili Pashkévich was the pioneer of opera among Russian composers with Anyuta (1772), which was followed by Neschastye ot karety (The Carriage Accident, 1779). He also produced two operas to libretti by Empress Catherine II: Fevey (1786) and Fedul s det'mi (Fedul and his sons, 1792). Dmitri Bortniansky studied in Italy with Galuppi and wrote several operas in Italian: Creonte (1776), Quinto Fabio (1778), Don Carlo (1786). Yevstignéi Fomín also studied in Italy with father Martini. With libretto by Catherine II he composed Novgorodskiy bogatyr Boyeslayevich (Boyeslayevich, the hero of Novgorod, 1786).

In Poland, the reigns of Augustus II, Augustus III and Estanislaus II saw opera flourish under royal patronage. Numerous Polish nobles hired Italian companies for their palaces. In 1765 the Teatr Narodowy (National Theater) in Warsaw was inaugurated. In 1778 the first opera in Polish, Nedza Uzazesliwiona (Sorrow turned into joy), by Maciej Kamieński, was premiered. After the partition of Poland, the taste for opera continued, with composers such as Jan Stefani (Krakowiacy Górale [Cracovians and Highlanders], 1794).

In Sweden, Queen Louise Ulrica encouraged the construction of the Drottningholm Theater, inaugurated in 1766, and invited composers such as Francesco Uttini, author of the first opera in Swedish, Thetis och Pelée (1773). King Gustav III was a promoter of the Kungliga Operan (Royal Opera) in Stockholm, founded in 1782. Several German composers settled there, such as Johann Gottlieb Naumann, author of Cora och Alonzo (1782) and, in collaboration with King Gustav III, Gustav Wasa (1786); and Joseph Martin Kraus, who was nicknamed the Swedish Mozart, author of Proserpin (1781) and Dido och Aeneas (1799).

In Hungary, incorporated into the Austro-Hungarian Empire, opera enjoyed little protection, apart from that exercised by the Esterházy, Haydn's protectors. József Chudy was the author of the first opera in Hungarian, the singspiel Pikkó Herceg (Duke Pikkó, 1793, now lost).

In these years opera was being introduced in North America: in United States, the first performances were given at the John Street Theater in New York, opened in 1767. Among the opera's pioneers were Benjamin Carr (The Archers, or the Mountaineers of Switzerland [The Archers, or the Mountaineers of Switzerland], 1796) and John Bray (The Indian Princess, 1808). In Canada, the French Joseph Quesnel was the first author of operas in that country: Colas et Colinette (1805), Lucas et Cécile (1809).

Among the singers, at this time it is worth remembering: Austrian soprano Caterina Cavalieri, Salieri's pupil and lover, for whom Mozart wrote the role of Konstanze in Die Entführung aus dem Serail and that of Elvira in Don Giovanni; English soprano Nancy Storace, sister of composer Stephen Storace, for whom Mozart wrote the role of Susanna in Le Nozze di Figaro; Joseph Legros, tenor and composer, who performed roles by Lully, Rameau, Grétry and Gluck; and German tenor Anton Raaff, for whom Mozart wrote his Idomeneo.

== 19th century ==
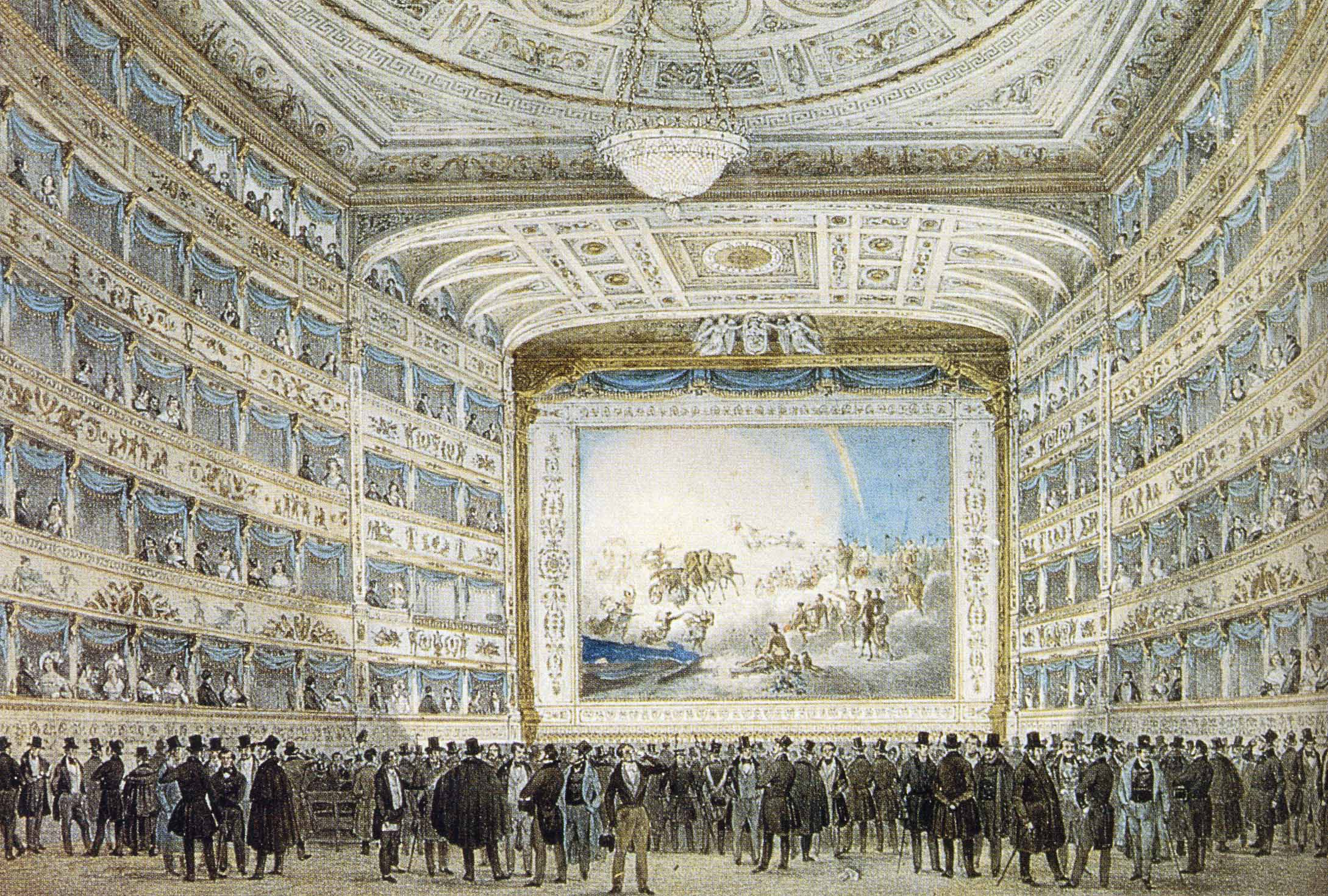
Interior of the La Fenice Theater in Venice (1837)

Between the end of the 18th century and the beginning of the 19th century, the foundations of the contemporary society were laid, marked in the political field by the end of absolutism and the establishment of democratic governments. -an impulse initiated with the French Revolution – and, in the economic field, by the Industrial Revolution and the consolidation of capitalism, which would have a response in Marxism and the class struggle. In the field of art and music, an evolutionary dynamic of styles began to follow one another chronologically with increasing speed, culminating in the 20th century with an atomization of styles and currents that coexist and oppose, influence and confront each other. Music was a reflection on numerous occasions of these artistic movements, which occurred not only in art and music, but also in literature, theater, dance and other artistic manifestations.

In music, the most outstanding aspect was the progressive independence of composers and performers from the patronage of the aristocracy and the Church. The new addressee was the public, preferably the bourgeoisie, but also the common people, in theaters and concert halls. The new situation gave the musician greater creative freedom, but also deprived him of the previous security provided by his patrons, as he was subject to the ups and downs of success or failure.

Opera developed in this century in an increasingly grandiloquent manner, on large stages and with large scenographic stagings, with larger and larger orchestras performing more powerful and sonorous music. This forced vocal performers to increase their singing power, to fill the entire theater and to be heard above the instruments. To this end, new techniques of voice enhancement appeared and new registers emerged, such as the "robust tenor", the "tenore di forza" and the "dramatic soprano".

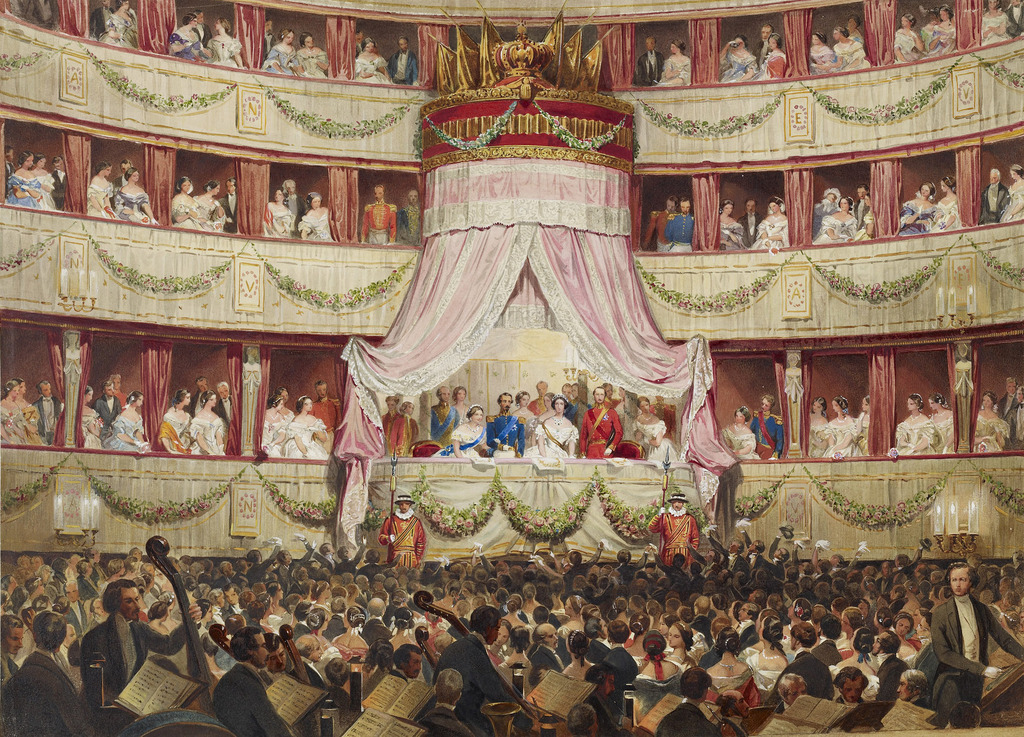
Queen Victoria and Napoleon III at the Royal Opera House in London on 19 April 1855

In the second half of this century, the operetta was established as a minor genre of opera, based on a theatrical piece with dances and songs alternating with dialogues, with light music of popular taste. It became established in France as a derivation of opéra-comique, in small theaters such as the Bouffes-Parisiens sponsored by the composer Jacques Offenbach. It was also well established in Vienna, where it was nourished by the traditional German singspiel. This type of work gave rise to the current musical.

During this century numerous innovations and advances were introduced in the scenographic field, especially in lighting: in 1822 the gas light was introduced for the first time at the Paris Opera, in the performance of Aladin ou La lampe merveilleuse by Nicolas Isouard; in 1849 the electric light was premiered in Le Prophète, by Giacomo Meyerbeer. One of the best scenographers was Pierre-Luc-Charles Cicéri, creator of large and ingenious sets with the latest technologies of the time, as well as special effects, fireworks and other novelties. He invented a moving panorama composed of a curtain that was rolled up on a cylinder and, when unrolled, produced movement effects on the scene. On the other hand, the pioneer of photography Louis Daguerre introduced the double-painted sets, which thanks to lighting effects caused a sensation of movement. The most prestigious theater was – along with La Scala in Milan – the Paris Opera, which, after various venues, was located in 1821 in the hall on rue Le Peletier, where it enjoyed the golden age of the grand-opéra. Destroyed by fire in 1873, two years later the Opéra Garnier, designed by architect Charles Garnier, was inaugurated, with seating for 2600 spectators.

=== Romanticism ===
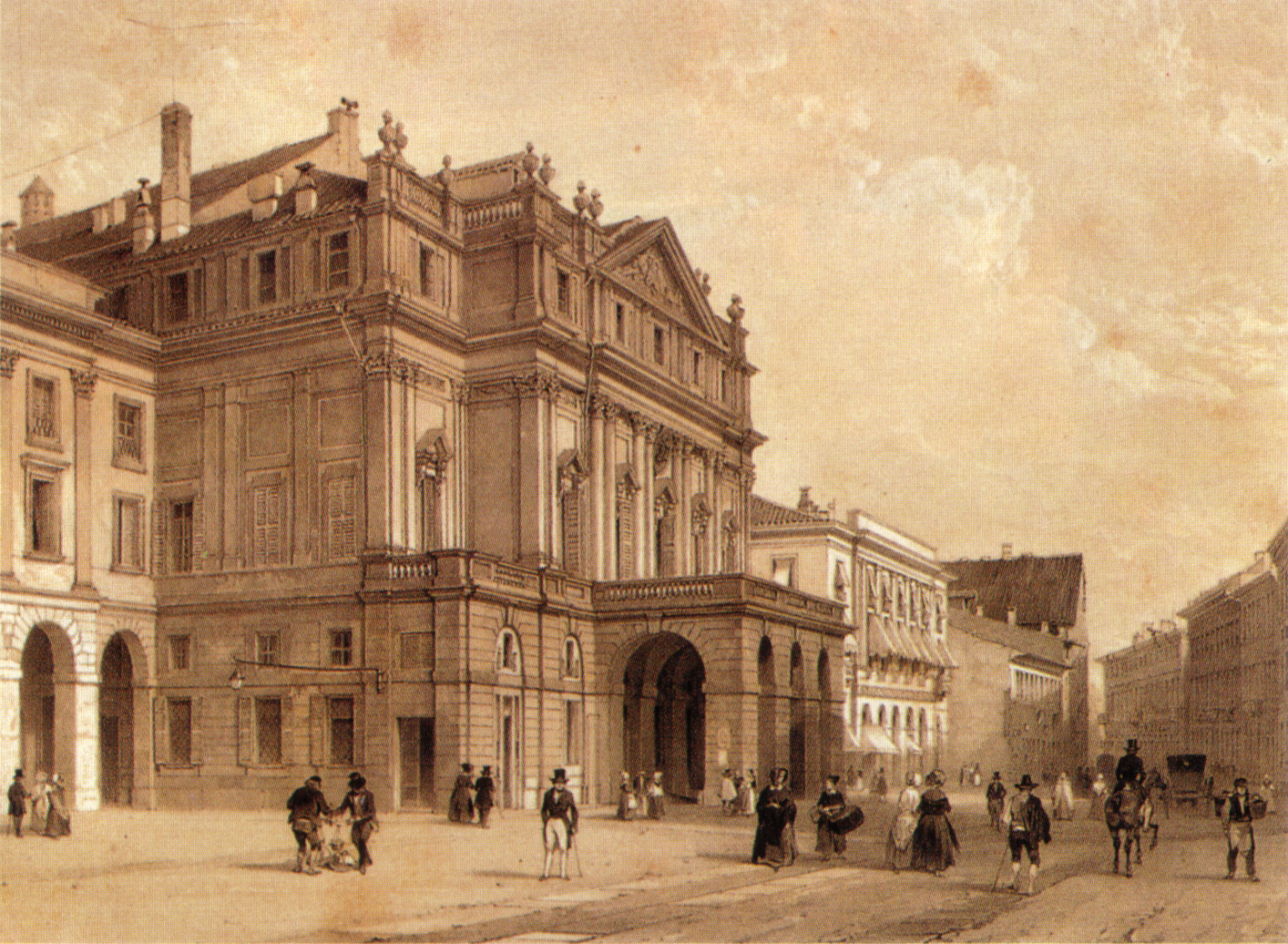
The La Scala theater in Milan in the 19th century

Romantic music survived for almost the entire century, until the appearance of the musical avant-garde of the 20th century. It was characterized, as in the rest of the arts, by the predominance of feeling and passion, of the subjectivity and emotionality of the artist, with exaltation of national and popular music. The orchestra was enlarged, to fully satisfy the expressiveness of the artist, the new feelings that nested in him (the sublime, the pathetic). Romanticism emphasized individuality, irrationality as a reaction to enlightened reason. The protagonism was won by the human being and his heroic actions, as opposed to mythological gods and baroque deus ex machina interventions. A new interest in nature and its sounds arose, which were imitated in numerous compositions: storms, fire, avalanches, volcanic eruptions, etc. The ideal instrument to reflect the romantic passions was the piano, from which numerous virtuosos emerged, such as Franz Liszt and Frédéric Chopin. Alongside it were gaining importance the percussion instruments—especially timpani and cymbals—in search of more expressive sounds. New instruments were also incorporated to the orchestra, such as the harp, the piccolo, the contrabassoon and the English horn. At the same time, movements that expressed more emotions were sought, such as prestissimo, molto agitato or adagio lamentoso. The figure of the conductor became more important and many composers were at the same time conductors; one of them, Carl Maria von Weber, introduced the baton for conducting.

This period saw a remarkable development of opera, especially in Italy, where it was the golden age of bel canto. It stood out for the brilliance of its voices, the coloratura, the ornamentation, gaining importance the role of the soprano, while for the tenor it became fashionable from 1840 the do de pecho. Romantic opera had two aspects: the comic – or buffa – and the dramatic, based on the great romantic literary dramas. The difference between recitative and aria was diluted, predominating the cantabile melody over the rest of the elements. On the other hand, the romantic opera stood out for its folkloristic taste and the use of themes based on the history and mythology of the country. A new taste for so-called "gothic" themes also emerged, which in opera gave a variant called morte ("death"), provoked by the grim events of the French Revolution; a good example would be Lucia di Lammermoor, by Gaetano Donizetti.

In this period the librettos varied in themes and plots, but had few structural transformations, so that conventional language and the simplification of dialogues and situations predominated as in previous eras. One of the most successful novelists of the period was Walter Scott, nineteen of whose novels were adapted into sixty-three operas. Another was Johann Wolfgang von Goethe, whose texts were set to music in 122 operas, twenty of them on his work Faust. He also personally wrote eight librettos for singspiel. Fifty-six operas were also composed on texts by Friedrich von Schiller. Other writers who also inspired numerous operas were Victor Hugo and Aleksandr Pushkin.

==== France ====
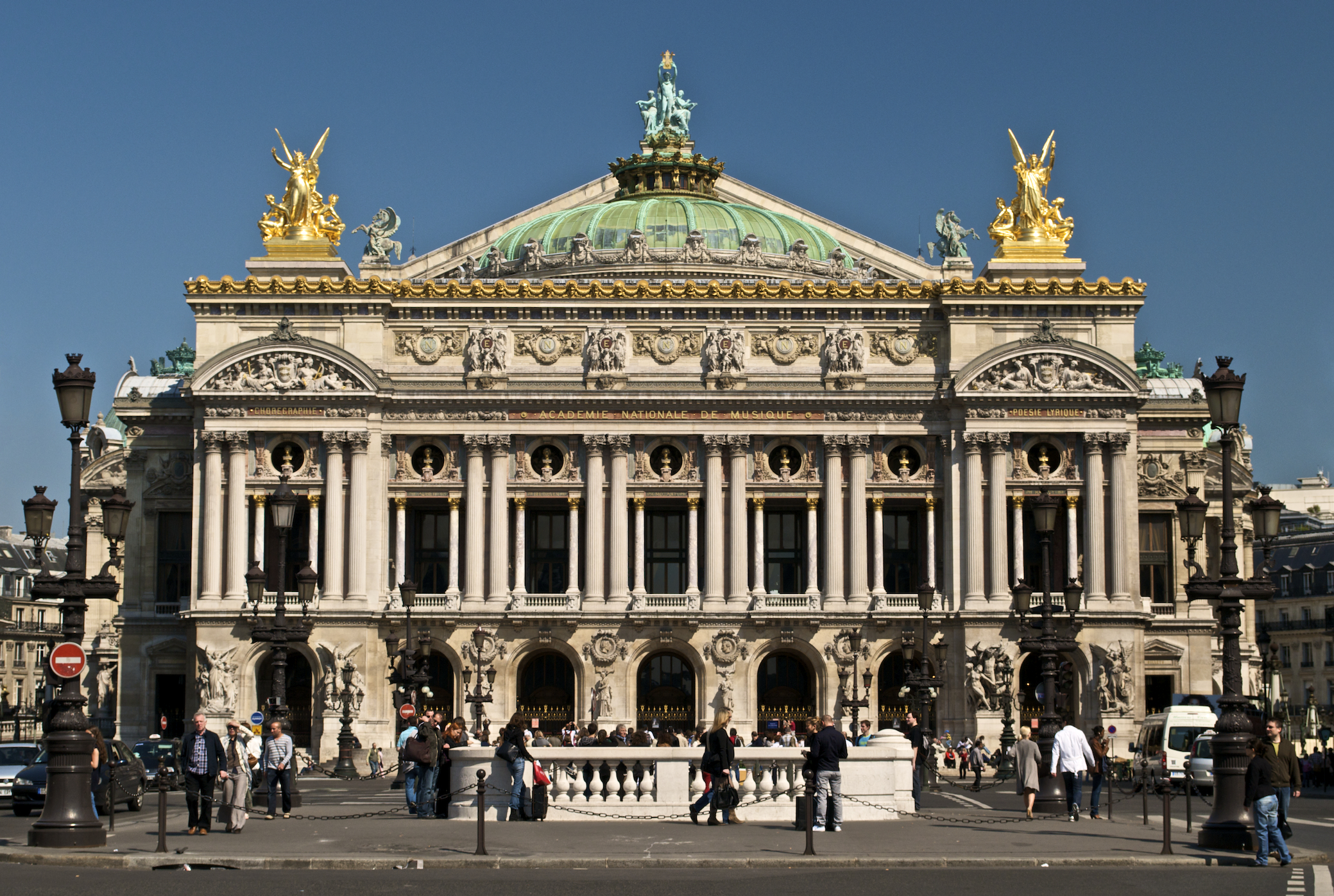
Palais Garnier, Paris

The germ of romantic opera arose in France, where opera seria and opera buffa tended to converge, at the same time that the Gluckian reform was coming to fruition. The recitatives with harpsichord were discarded and became orchestral. The plots based on the Greco-Latin classics were abandoned to set the new romantic dramas to music, with a preference for medieval settings (bards, troubadours) or popular legends. At this time the so-called grand-opéra developed in France, characterized by the exuberance of its large stage productions, with large orchestras and numerous characters, with generally historical and epic themes, aimed at a bourgeois audience. The opéra-comique genre also continued, which in 1805 was established at the Salle Feydeau and, in 1840, at the Salle Favart. Here unconventional, new or foreign works were premiered, which were rejected at the more conservative Paris Opera.

The beginnings of French romantic opera are situated in the post-revolutionary environment. The change of regime entailed the replacement of classical mythological themes, linked to the aristocracy, by new themes and characters based on popular heroism, with a series of works that were called "salvation opera", including Les rigueurs du cloître (1790) by Henri-Montan Berton and Le siège de Lille (1792) by Rodolphe Kreutzer. However, these propagandist works of the revolution failed to make the public forget that opera was first and foremost entertainment, a fact helped by the work of Étienne Nicolas Méhul, who in those years premiered several operas: Euphrosine (1790), Stratonice (1792), Mélidore et Phrosine (1794) and Ariodant (1799). In these works, the characters found themselves in random situations that threw them into intense emotions, a fact that would be the neuralgic point of romantic opera.

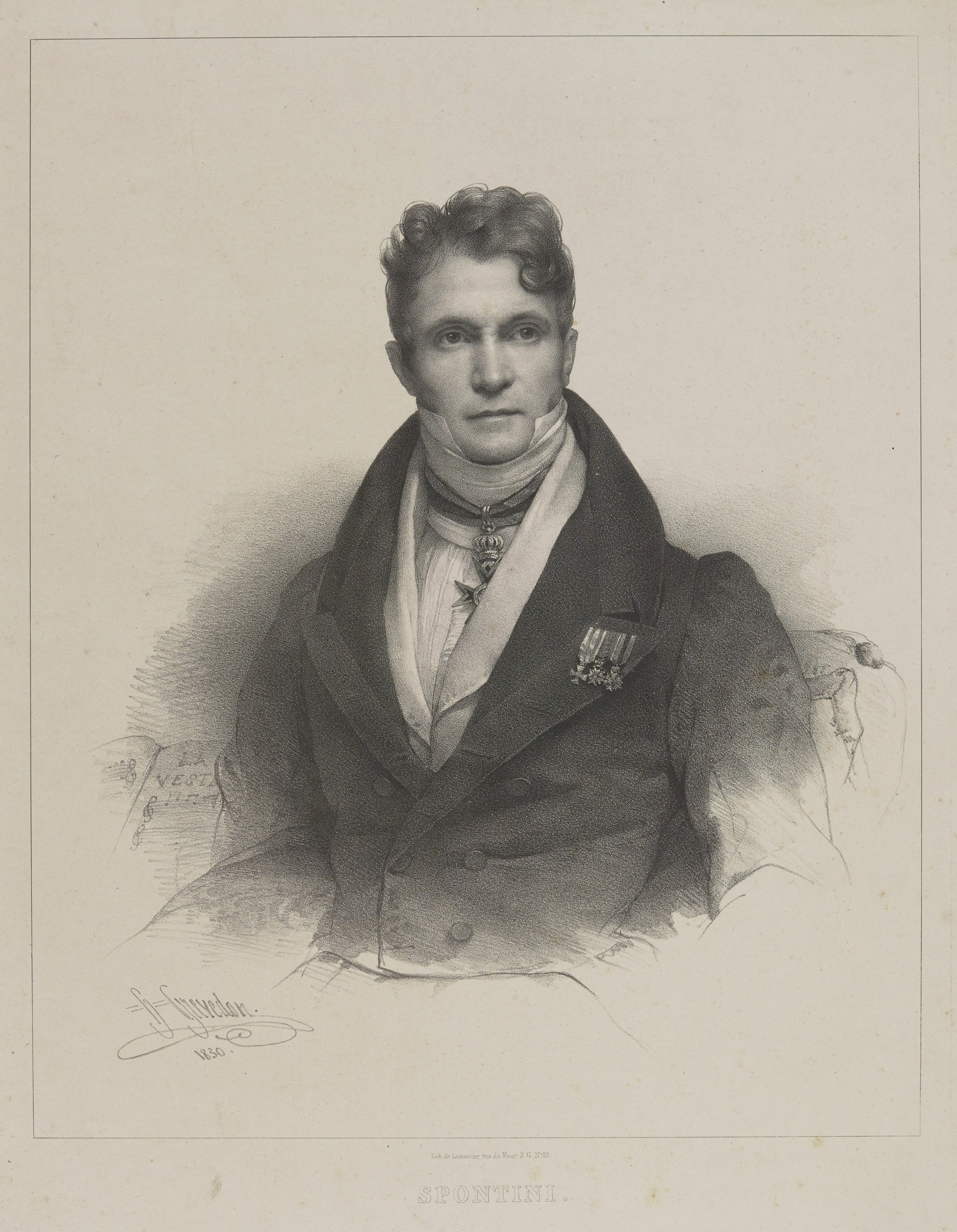
Gaspare Spontini

Paradoxically, among the first exponents of French romantic opera were two Italian composers established in France: Luigi Cherubini and Gaspare Spontini. The former settled in Paris in 1787, when he had already composed thirteen operas in Italy. In Démophon (1788) he began the course of what would become French romantic opera, which he would put on track with Lodoïska (1791), where he introduced more real characters and more dramatic situations, with a richer and more powerful orchestration, and effects based on nature, in this case a fire. His masterpiece was Médée (Medea, 1797), based on a tragedy by Pierre Corneille. Spontini moved to Paris in 1800, where he preferentially cultivated the tragic genre. His first success was Milton (1804), which was followed by La vestale (1807). He was the introducer of numerous components of the grand-opéra, such as large choirs, processions or bands on stage, culminating in his Fernand Cortez (1809), about the Spanish conquistador Hernán Cortés, which included a cavalry charge and fleet fire.

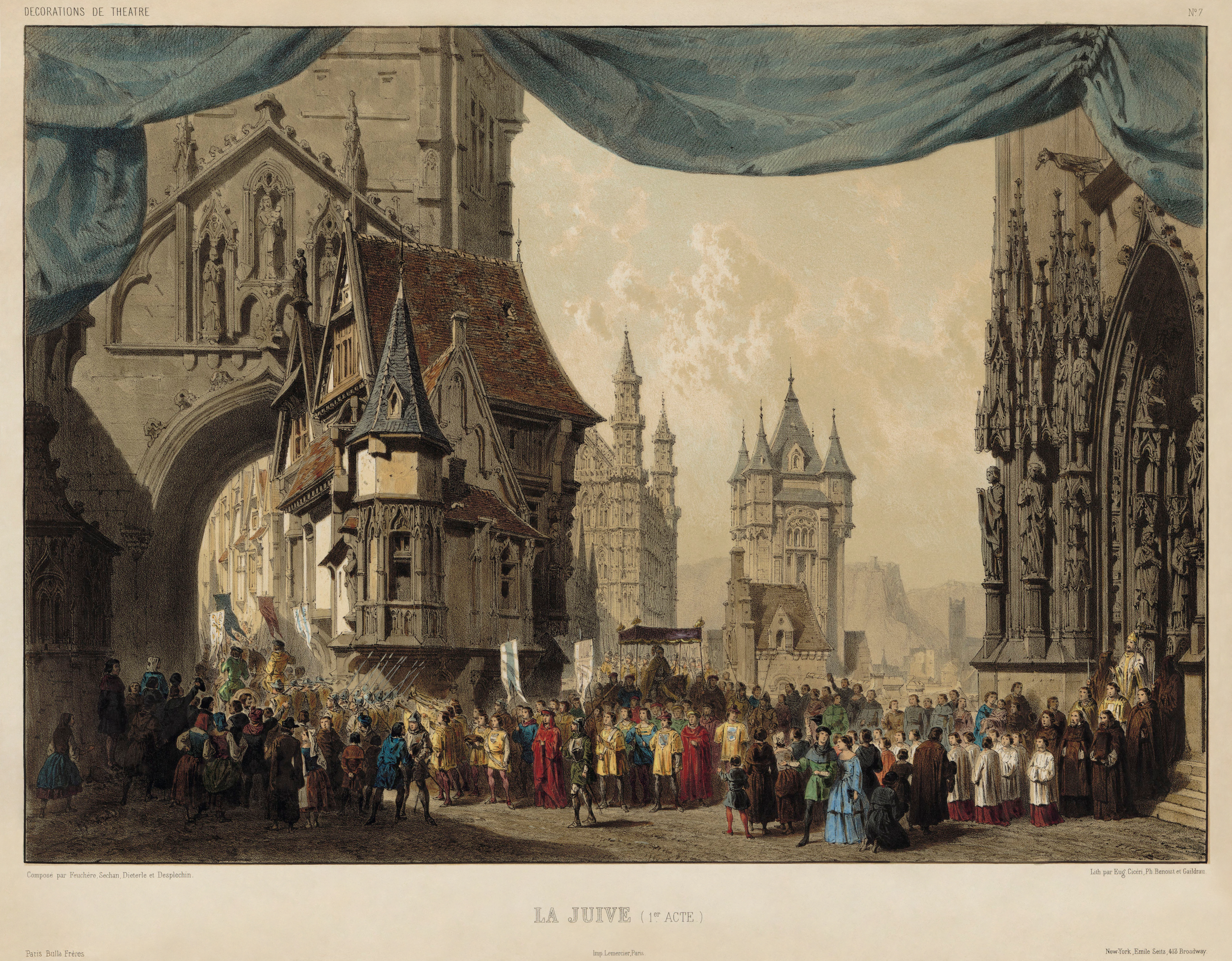
Act I of the opera La Juive (1835), by Fromental Halévy

Cherubini had several pupils, among whom Daniel-François-Esprit Auber and Jacques Fromental Halévy stood out. Auber was the master of opéra-comique, in which he began with La bergère châtelaine (1820) and Emma (1821). In 1823 he teamed up with the playwright Eugène Scribe, with whom he created Leicester (1823), La neige (1823), Léocadie (1824), Le Maçon (1825) and Fra Diavolo (1830). He also tried grand-opéra with La muette de Portici (La muette de Portici, 1828). Halévy suffered several failures until he had his first success with Clari (1828), which he wrote for the Spanish mezzo-soprano María Malibrán. His masterpiece was La Juive (La judía, 1835), of which Wagner praised the feeling of its great lyric tragedy. He alternated opéra-comique (L'éclair, 1835; Le lazzarone, 1844) with grand-opéra (Guido et Ginevra, 1838; Charles VI, 1844).

Among the earliest exponents of French romanticism was also François-Adrien Boieldieu. He composed his first opera, La fille coupable (1793), at the age of eighteen. Established in Paris, he triumphed with his comic operas, but he also tried other genres, as in Le Calife of Baghdad (1800), of exotic and oriental taste. After a stay in Russia, on his return he renewed his success with Jean de Paris (1812). His greatest success was La dame blanche (1825).

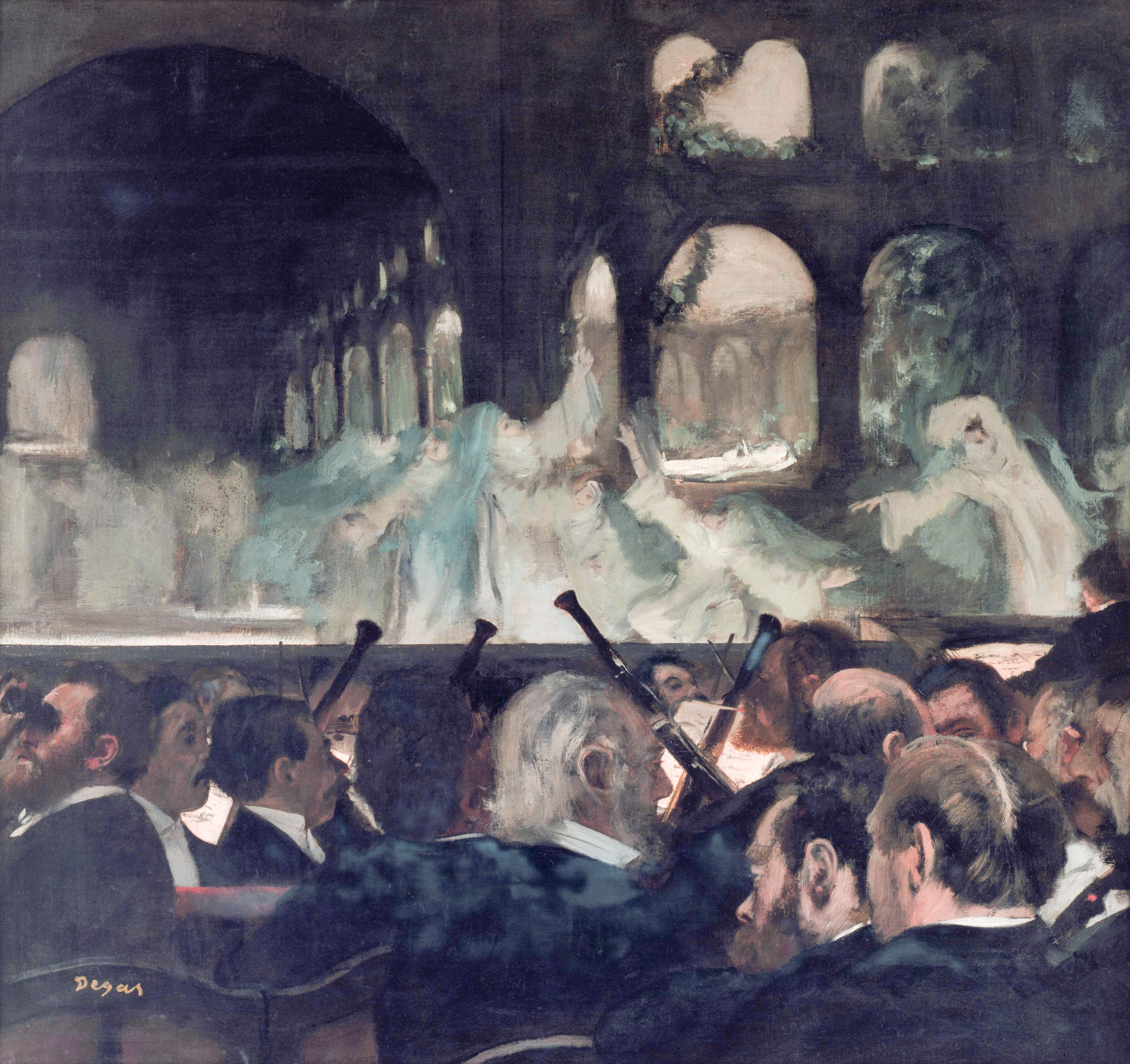
Ballet of the Nuns, from Act III of Robert le diable by Giacomo Meyerbeer (1831), painting by Edgar Degas (1876)

The greatest champion for the beginning of the grand-opéra was the German Giacomo Meyerbeer. He settled in Paris in 1831, when he had his first success with Robert le diable, set in medieval Sicily. His masterpiece was Les Huguenots (1836), about the persecution of French Protestants (Huguenots) in the 16th century, which was notable for its lavish staging. His third major success was Le Prophète (The Prophet, 1849). Robert le diable included a ballet – the Ballet of the Nuns – in which the dancers, in the role of spirits rising from the tombs, were dressed in white tulle, which became the classic ballet costume (the tutu); this work is considered the first modern ballet in history.

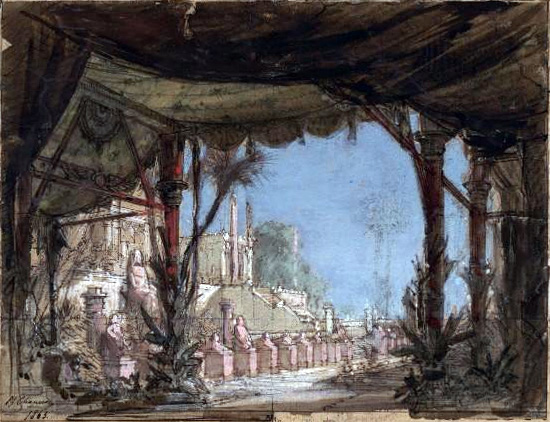
Set design for Les troyens by Hector Berlioz, by Philippe Chaperon

Hector Berlioz devoted himself to epic opera. He began five operas, of which he completed only three: Benvenuto Cellini (1838), about the life of Renaissance sculptor, based on his autobiography; Les troyens (The Trojans, 1856–1858), with a libretto by Berlioz himself based on The Aeneid by Virgil, a full-length work that was divided into two parts for its premiere; and Béatrice et Bénédict (1862), also written by the composer himself from Shakespeare's Much Ado About Nothing. He was also the author of La Damnation de Faust (The Damnation of Faust, 1846), a musical work for orchestra, solo voices and choir usually performed also in opera houses.

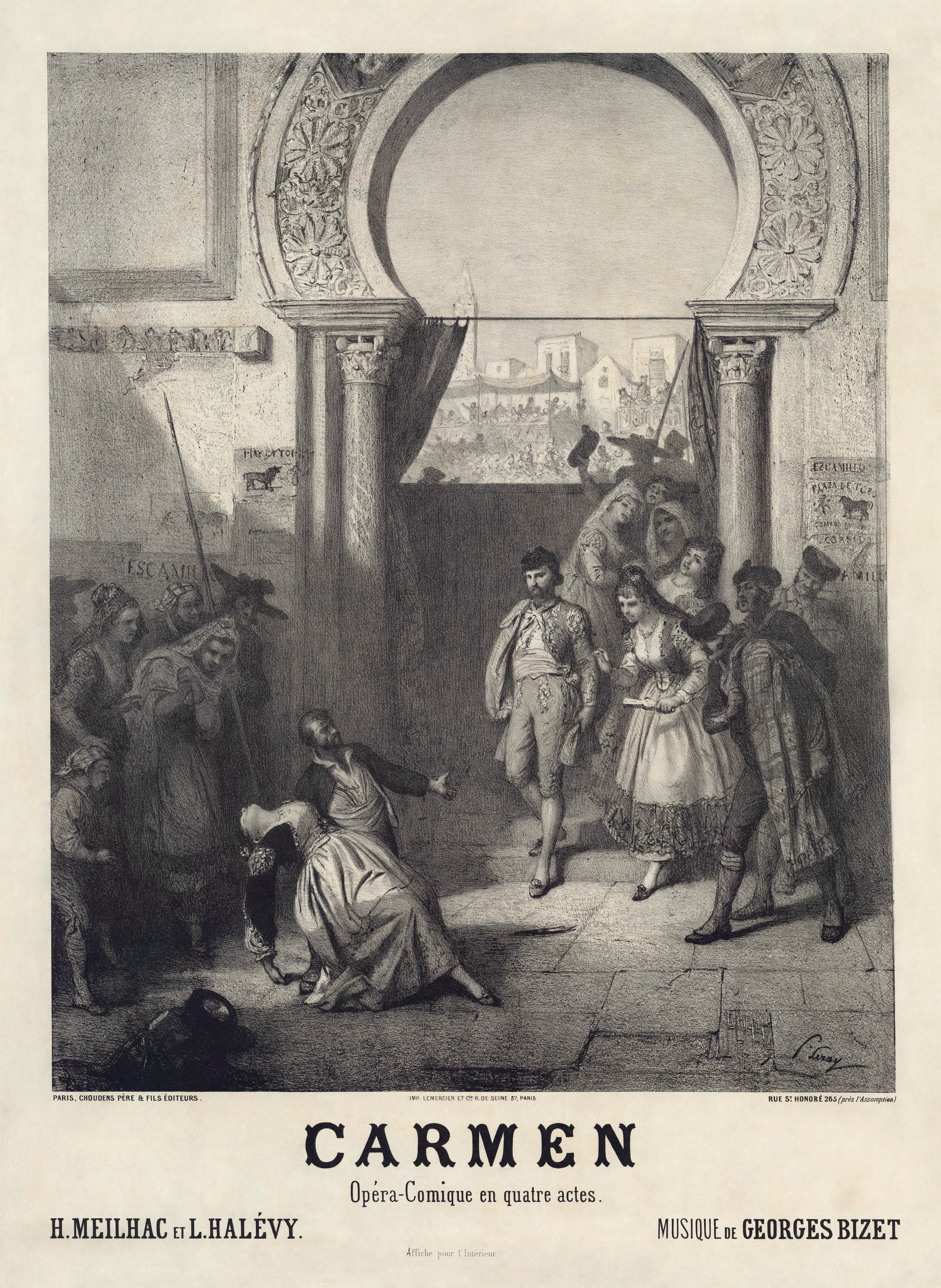
Poster of Carmen (1875), by Georges Bizet

In a second generation—sometimes referred to as late Romanticism— stood out Georges Bizet, a composer who died prematurely at the age of thirty-six, so he could only complete six operas, although he projected about thirty. He was a disciple of Halévy, who wrote him his first libretto, the operetta Le Docteur Miracle (1857). He resided for three years in Italy, where he premiered Don Procopio (1859), a comic opera. His next project was Les pêcheurs de perles (Les pêcheurs de perles, 1863), set in Ceylon, which reflected the taste for exoticism of the time. In 1865 he made Ivan IV for the Théâtre Lyrique. In the same theater he premiered two years later La jolie fille de Perth (The Beautiful Girl of Perth), based on a play by Walter Scott. Another bet for exoticism was Djamileh (1872), based on a play by Alfred de Musset, set in Egypt. In 1875 he premiered his masterpiece, Carmen, based on a novel by Prosper Mérimée, set in the folkloric Spain of gypsies and bandits. It was an opéra-comique which, however, introduced realistic elements, according to the literary naturalism of the time, a phenomenon that in Italy would give the verismo. He introduced popular Spanish music and dances, such as a seguidilla, as well as a habanera (L'amour est un oiseau rebelle), (Note: Inspired by the habanera El arreglito, by Sebastián Iradier Alier (2007, p. 568).) a genre of Cuban native provenance. Bizet died three months after the premiere.

Charles Gounod began in church music, until he turned to opera, with a total of twelve works in his career. His first works were of the grand-opéra genre (Sapho, 1851; La nonne sanglante, 1854), but were not very successful, so he switched to opéra-comique. He chose a play by Molière, Le médecin malgré lui, which he premiered in 1858. It was followed by Faust (1859), his masterpiece. His later works include Mireille (1864) and Roméo et Juliette (1867).

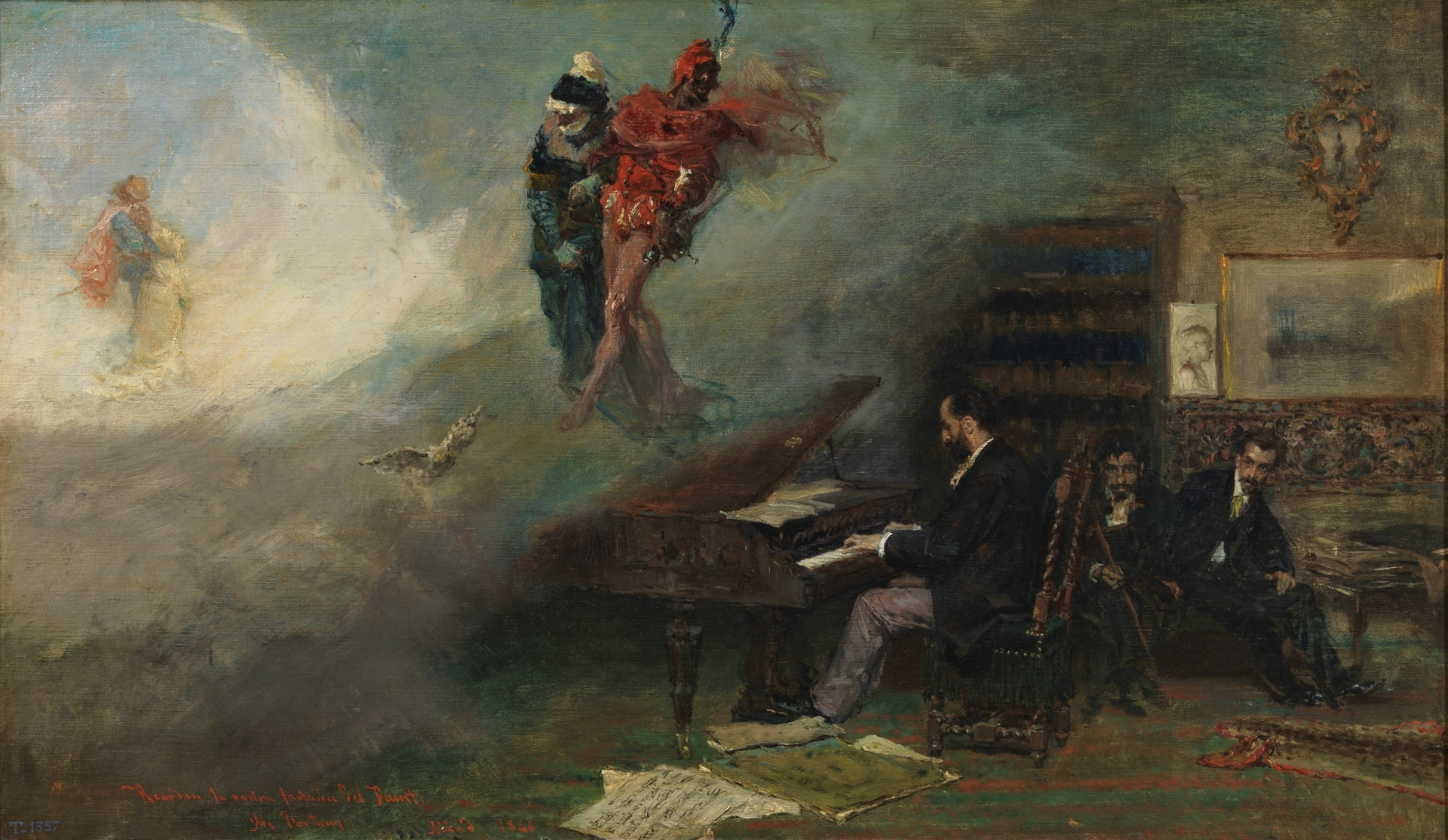
Fantasy on Faust, by Mariano Fortuny (1866), oil painting inspired by the opera Faust by Charles Gounod

Ambroise Thomas was a classicist, a fervent detractor of Wagner and "modern" music. He composed nine operas, strictly based on the French tradition. His first success was La double échelle (The Double Staircase, 1837). He treated the comic genre with Le songe d'une nuit d'été (The ground of a summer night, 1850), not based on Shakespeare despite the title. He was influenced by Gounod, as seen in Mignon (1866) and Hamlet (1868).

Barcarolle, from Les Contes d'Hoffmann (1881), a play by Jacques Offenbach

Another German, Jacques Offenbach, excelled in the comic genre. He began his musical career as a cellist, until he switched to composition. Endowed with a keen sense of dramatic art and well acquainted with the tastes of the French public, he devoted himself to operetta, for which he rented the Théâtre Marigny, which he renamed Bouffes-Parisiens, where he premiered works by himself and other composers. In 1858 he composed Orphée aux enfers (Orpheus in the underworld), an irreverent reinterpretation of classical Greek myths, which scandalized the purist grand-opéra public. It was followed by La belle Hélène (1864) and La vie Parisienne (1866). With Les Contes d'Hoffmann (1881) he attempted something more serious, but died during rehearsals. He counted as librettists Henri Meilhac and Ludovic Halévy, nephew of composer Fromental Halévy – authors also of the libretto of Bizet's Carmen. Other exponents of operetta were: Edmond Audran (Le Grand Mogol, 1877; La Mascotte, 1880) and Alexandre Charles Lecocq (La fille de Madame Angot, 1872; Le petit duc, 1878)

Flower Duet, from the opera Lakmé by Léo Delibes (1883)

Camille Saint-Saëns was a child prodigy as a pianist and began composing at the age of six. He was a prolific composer, who wrote thirteen operas, as well as orchestral and vocal music. His first success was with the operetta La Princesse jaune (The Yellow Princess, 1872). After that he switched to grand-opéra, with which he had his greatest success with Samson et Delilah (1877), based on the biblical story. In 1883 he premiered Henri VIII, about the relationship between Henry VIII of England and Anne Boleyn.

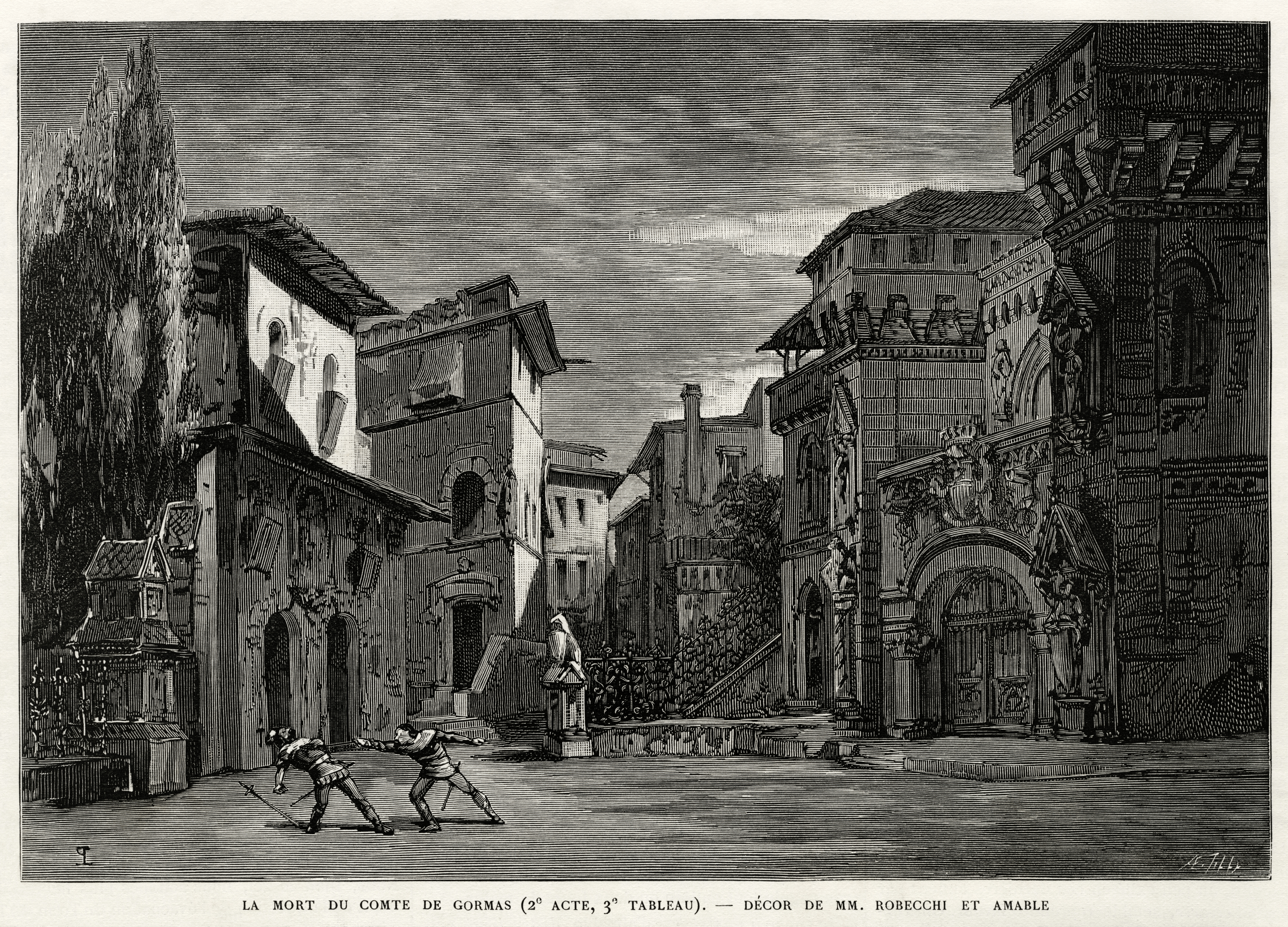
Scene from the original 1885 production of Le Cid by Jules Massenet

Léo Delibes excelled especially in operetta and ballet. His first success, Deux vieilles gardes (1856), already denoted his facility for composing melodies. His masterpiece was Lakmé (1883), set in colonial India, which was notable for its exoticism.

Jules Massenet was a pupil of Ambroise Thomas, a fact that turned him towards opera. His first success was Le roi de Lahore (1877). It was followed by Hérodiade (1883) and Manon (1884). After receiving a commission from the Paris Opera he composed Le Cid (1885). After Esclarmonde (1889) he had several failures, until reaching success again with Werther (1892), on Goethe's work. He enjoyed equal fortune with Thaïs (1894), of orientalist taste, whose Meditation is one of his best known melodies. His next success was La Navarraise (1894), which included cannon sounds. His later works include Sapho (1897), Cendrillon (1899), Chérubin (1905) and Don Quichotte (1909).

Meditation, from Thaïs (1894), opera by Jules Massenet

Emmanuel Chabrier studied law, but eventually turned to his greatest hobby, music. A great admirer of Wagner, in 1886 he premiered Gwendoline, where he used the Wagnerian leitmotif. He later turned, however, toward light music of comic tone, with which he achieved his greatest success, Le roi malgré lui (The King in spite of himself, 1887).

Other composers of French Romanticism were: Adolphe Adam (Le Chalet, 1834; Le Postillon de Lonjumeau, 1836; Le toréador, 1849; Si j'étais roi, 1852), Félicien David (La perle du Brésil, 1851; Lalla-Roukh, 1862; Le Saphir, 1965), Vincent d'Indy (Le Chant de la cloche, 1886; Fervaal, 1897; L'Étranger, 1903), Benjamin Godard (Les Bijoux de Jeannette, 1878; Pierre de Zalaméa, 1884; Jocelyn, 1888; La Vivandière, 1893), Ferdinand Hérold (Zampa, 1831; Le Pré aux Clercs, 1832), Nicolas Isouard (Cendrillon, 1810; Jeannot et Colin, 1814), Édouard Lalo (Le Roi d'Ys, 1888), Jean-François Lesueur (Ossian, ou les Bardes, 1804) and Ernest Reyer (Sigurd, 1882; Salammbô, 1890).

==== Italy ====
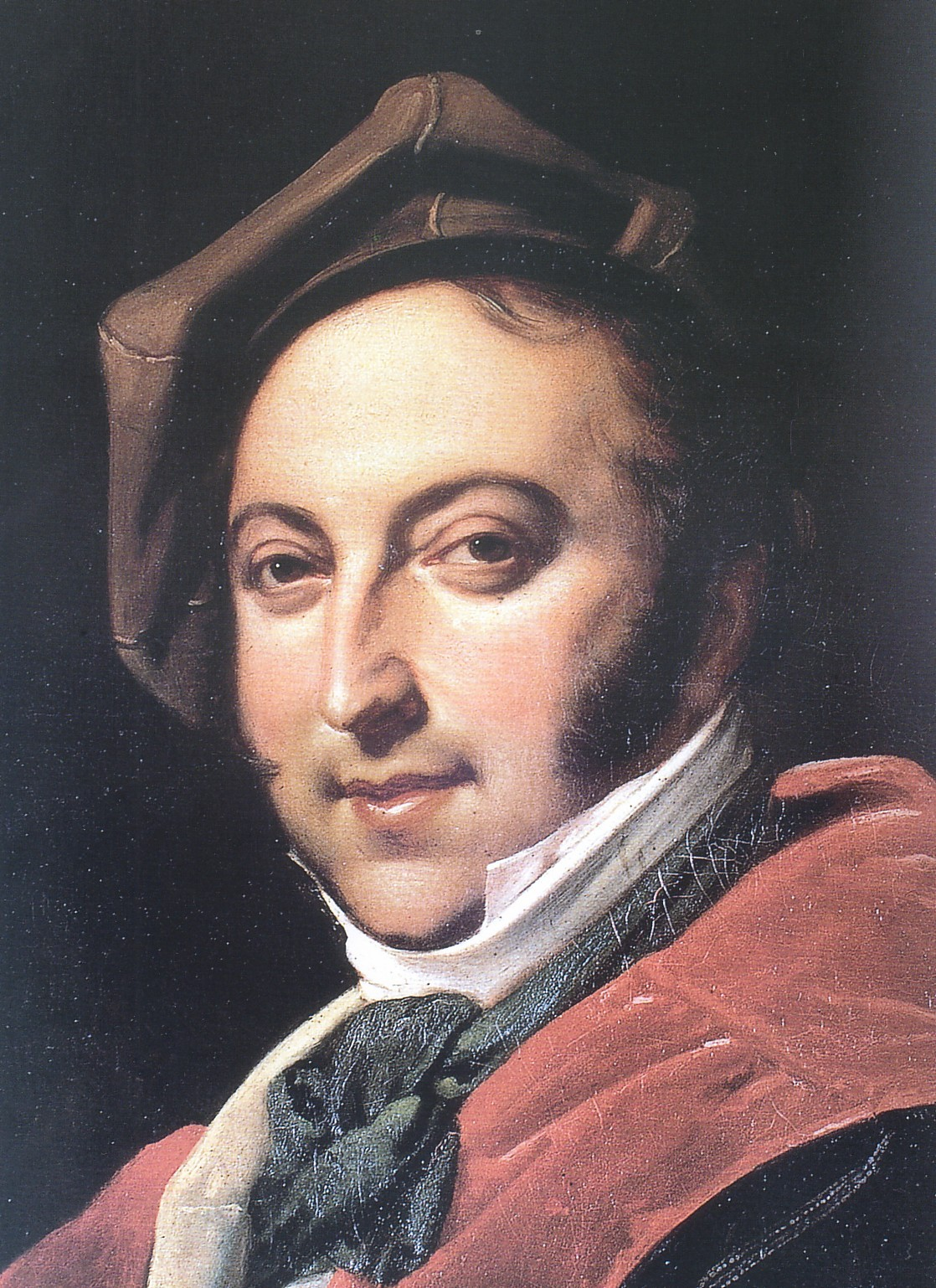
Gioachino Rossini

In Italy, Romanticism had a markedly populist and nationalist component, in which opera was a means of political vindication for the unification of the peninsula, which would take place in 1870. It was the era of the bel canto, of the showcasing of voices, especially soprano voices. Composers such as Rossini, Bellini and Donizetti were staunch defenders of bel canto, at a time in Europe in general when the orchestra was becoming more and more prominent. However, classical bel canto came to a virtual end with Rossini, while Bellini and Donizetti introduced some innovations, such as the substitution of the canto fiorito for the canto declamato, and the reservation of bel canto passages for moments of intensity, as in the cabaletta or the so-called madness arias, in any case with less vocal ornamentation.

Largo al factotum, aria from Il barbiere di Siviglia (1816), by Gioachino Rossini

The first great name of the period was Gioachino Rossini, a composer between classicism and Romanticism. He studied at the Bologna Lyceum. Following in the footsteps of Paisiello and Cimarosa, he enriched the orchestra with more wind instruments. In 1810 he premiered in Venice La cambiale di matrimonio, a comic farce in one act, indebted to the Neapolitan opera, but with the new romantic spirit, more dynamic, with a more marked rhythm and with the tonal gradations introduced by the Mannheim school. This work pleased both the traditionalists and the supporters of innovation, who liked its timbral agility and its lively rhythm. It was followed by L'equivoco stravagante (1811), L'inganno felice (1812), La scala di seta (1812), L'occasione fa il ladro (1812) and Il signor Bruschino (1813). After a serious opera, Ciro in Babilonia (1812), in Tancredi, premiered the following year at the La Fenice theater in Venice, he abandoned the classical schemes and gave the structure of the opera buffa to the serious, with arias, cabalette and recitative with orchestra. He also introduced changes to the usual structure of opera buffa, in La pietra del paragone (1812) and L'italiana in Algeri (1813). Il Turco in Italia (1814) is a theatrical farce, where the librettist appears pretending to write the opera as it unfolds. That year he composed his last serious opera in the traditional style: Aureliano in Palmira, which still included a castrato in its cast, which added various ornamentations that did not please the composer, so from then on he composed the musical ornaments himself, closing the doors to improvisations by the singers. With this work, Rossini abandoned the historical and mythological themes typical of traditional opera seria and began to elaborate works of contemporary cut, based on the new romantic literature; a first case would be Elisabetta, regina d'Inghilterra (1815).

In 1816 he premiered at the Teatro Argentina in Rome Il barbiere di Siviglia (The Barber of Seville), based on the play by Beaumarchais, one of his greatest successes, of buffo genre, as well as La Cenerentola (1817), based on the story Cinderella by Charles Perrault. La gazza ladra (The Thieving Magpie, 1817) was a semi-serious opera, with a romantic plot, but with comic elements; he cultivated the same genre in Matilde di Shabran (1821). With Mosè in Egitto (1818) he elaborated a new hybrid, which he called azione sacrotragica. In serious genre he elaborated Otello (1816), La donna del lago (1819), Maometto secondo (1820, reconverted in 1826 into Le Siège de Corinthe), Zelmira (1822) and Semiramide (1823). He then began a journey of several years that took him to Vienna, Paris, London and again Paris, where he premiered Le comte Ory (1828) and Guillaume Tell (1829). In his works, Rossini eliminated the recitative without musical accompaniment, so they were set to music from beginning to end. He introduced the so-called "crescendo Rossini", a gradual crescendo in which the same theme was repeated successively increasing in intensity. He also introduced choirs, which became fashionable, generally placed between the aria and the cabaletta and between the two parts of the cabaletta. He stopped composing at the age of thirty-six and lived on his earnings ever since.

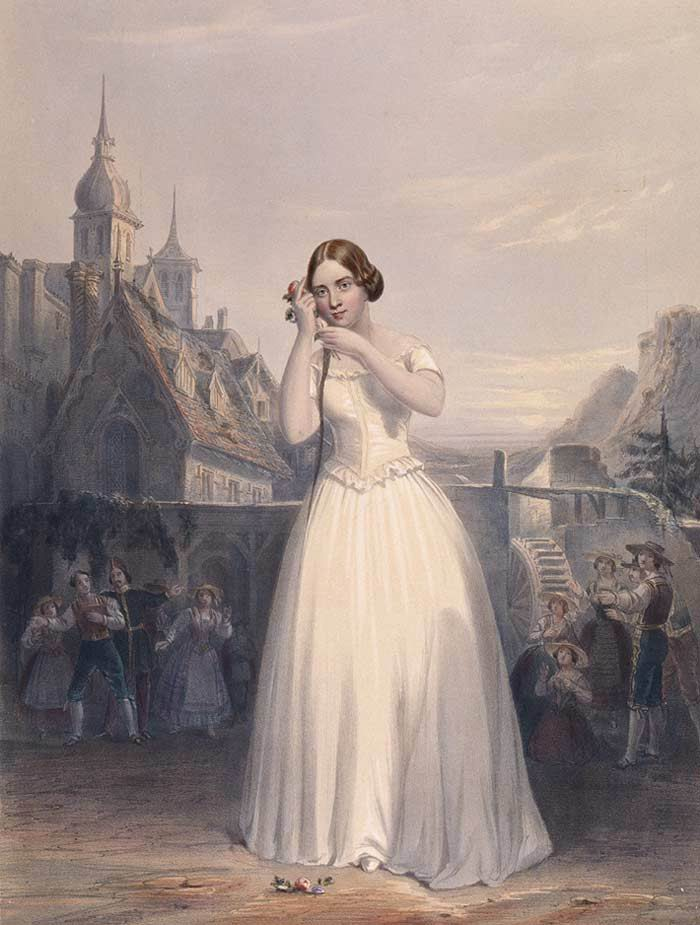
Jenny Lind performing The Somnambulist by Vincenzo Bellini

The next figures of Romanticism were Vincenzo Bellini and Gaetano Donizetti. Bellini produced more sentimental and melancholic works, of dreamlike evocation, with choppy, irregular phrases, the voice floating above the melody. He is considered the master of bel canto, for his long, lyrical vocal melodies. After two operas for which he began to be recognized (Adelson e Salvini, 1825; and Bianca e Fernando, 1826), he reaped his first success with Il pirata (1827), performed at La Scala in Milan. Two failures followed: La straniera (1829) and Zaira (1829). In 1830 he premiered in Venice I Capuleti e i Montecchi (Capulets and Montagues), a lyric tragedy with libretto by Felice Romani. His following works were fully romantic, with the common plot of the death of one of the lovers and the sublimation of love. La sonnambula (1831) was a semi-serious opera, based on a script for a pantomime-ballet by Eugène Scribe. From the same year is Norma, his most famous work, with libretto also by Romani, which includes the famous aria Casta Diva. In 1833, Beatrice di Tenda did not reap the expected success. His last work, I Puritani (1835), he composed and premiered in Paris, where it was a great success. He died at the age of thirty-four.

Casta Diva, aria from the opera Norma (1831), by Vincenzo Bellini, interpreted by Claudia Muzio

Donizetti achieved his first success with his eighth opera, Zoraida di Granata (1822), thanks to which he got a contract to compose operas for several theaters in Naples. He then decided to compose generally comic operas, which denoted the influence of Rossini and Bellini, such as L'ajo nell'imbarazzo (1824) and Viva la mamma! (1827). He also tackled the serious genre with Emilia di Liverpool (1824) and Il castello di Kenilworth (1829). With Anna Boleyn (1830) he had his first international success, and initiated a plot line based on characters of human character—especially women in the role of heroine—treated psychologically. This work opened doors for him to other cities: thus, he composed for Milan L'elisir d'amore (1832), a sentimental comedy with libretto by Felice Romani, where he humanized in the same way the characters of the opera buffa; it includes the aria Una furtiva lagrima, one of the most famous of the opera. He then tried his hand at the dramatic genre with the somber Lucrezia Borgia (1833), based on a story by Victor Hugo. It was followed by Parisina d'Este (1833), Torquato Tasso (1833) and Maria Stuarda (1834). Shortly thereafter he was inspired by the French grand-opéra for Lucia di Lammermoor (1835), based on a novel by Walter Scott (with libretto by Salvatore Cammarano). It was followed by Il campanello (1836), Belisario (1836), Pia de' Tolomei (1837), Roberto Devereux ossia il conte d'Essex (1837), Maria di Rudenz (1838) and Poliuto (1838). He traveled to Paris, where he premiered La Fille du régiment (1840) and La favorite (1840), in which he introduced the do de pecho and initiated the golden age of tenors. He went to Vienna, where he was appointed Kapellmeister. In 1841 he premiered Maria Padilla and, the following year, Linda di Chamounix. It was followed by Maria di Rohan (1843). Back in his country he returned to the comic genre with Don Pasquale (1843). His later works include Caterina Cornaro (1844) and Dom Sébastien, roi de Portugal (1843). He composed a total of sixty-seven operas. In his works the musical embellishments of bel canto are present, but he composed vibrant dramatic scenes, where the music enhances the effect of the voice. His melodies were crystalline, lively, with a magnetism that is still valid today.

Una furtiva lagrima, aria from L'elisir d'amore (1832), by Gaetano Donizetti, performed by Enrico Caruso in 1911

At the beginning of Romanticism, Saverio Mercadante and Giovanni Pacini also stood out. Mercadante studied in Naples and was encouraged to compose operas by Rossini. His first success was L'apoteosi d'Ercole (1819). It was followed by Elisa e Claudio (1821) and Donna Caritea, regina di Spagna (1826). In 1827 he settled in Spain, where he premiered Il posto abbandonato that same year. Returning to his country in 1831, he obtained a great success the following year with I normanni a Parigi. In 1837 he premiered in Milan Il giuramento, his masterpiece. After Bellini's death and Donizetti's installation in Paris he was for a few years the most famous composer in his country, with works such as Le due illustri rivali (1838), Elena de Feltre (1838), Il bravo (1839), La Vestale (1840), Il reggente (1843), Leonora (1844) and Gli Orazi e i Curiazi (Horatii e Curiatii, 1846). Pacini scored a major success in 1824 in Naples with Alessandro nell'Indie, which earned him an appointment as director of that city's Teatro San Carlo. His masterpiece was Saffo (1840). Other works of his were La fidanzata corsa (1842), Medea (1843), Lorenzino de' Medici (1845) and Buondelmonte (1845).

The brothers Luigi and Federico Ricci composed several works both together and separately, and are remembered as the authors of the last traditional opera buffa: Crispino e la comare (1850).

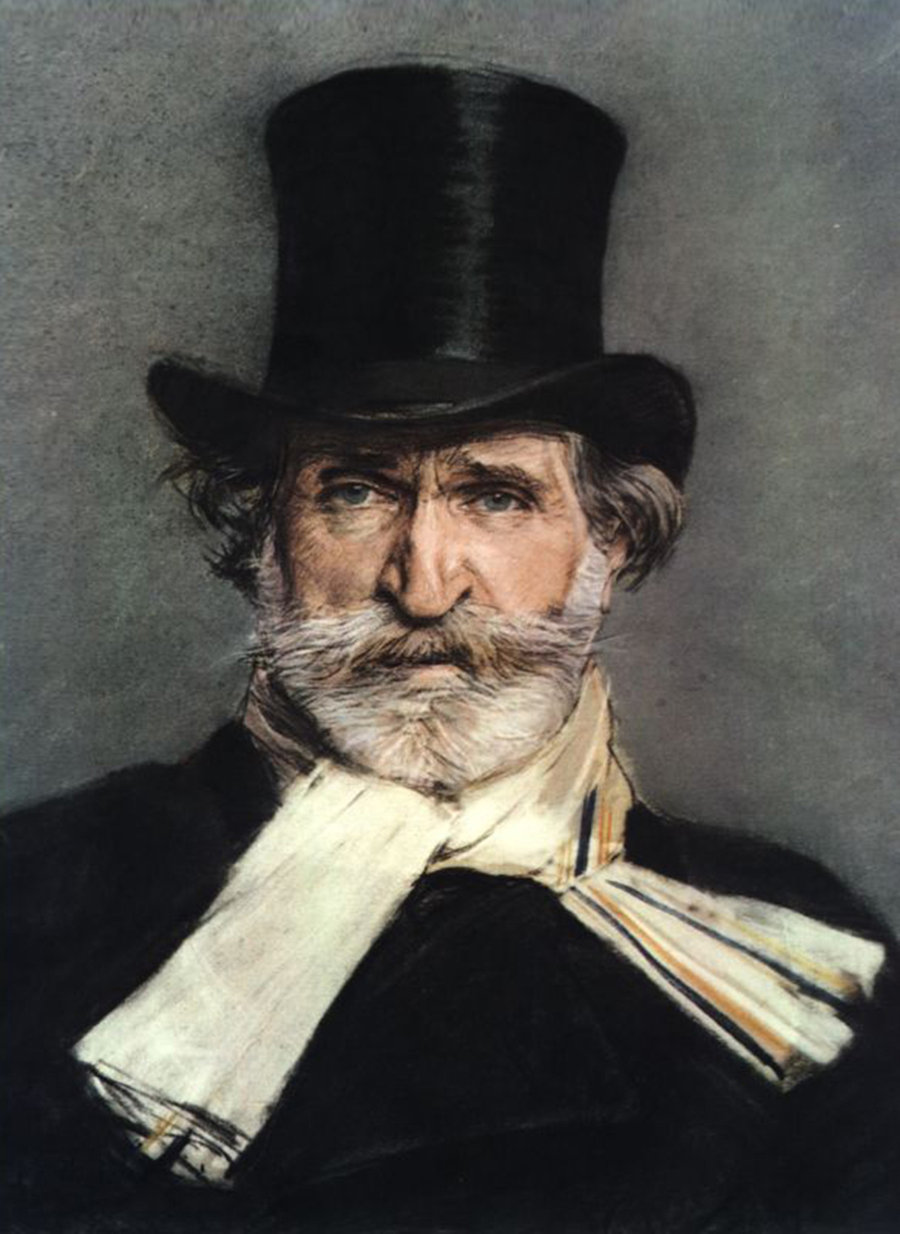
Giuseppe Verdi

Late Romanticism was dominated in Italy by the figure of Giuseppe Verdi. He began in romantic opera with a buffo air, with its recitative-aria-cabaletta structure, with themes generally inspired by medieval Italy. His early work denoted the influence of Rossini and continued the typical forms of bel canto. However, he gradually evolved towards the forms of the musical drama, de-emphasizing the aria – from which he did not manage to detach himself, as Wagner did – and enhancing the melody. Verdi's operas had a strong nationalist component, which turned his works into pleas against the foreign occupation of various regions of Italy, a fact that made him a symbol of the Risorgimento, the process that led to the unification of Italy.

Enrico Caruso interpreta La donna è mobile, from the opera Rigoletto by Giuseppe Verdi (1908)

After a first opera that was never performed (Rocester, 1836), with Oberto, Conte di San Bonifacio (1839) he had a resounding success at La Scala in Milan. On the other hand, his next work, Un giorno di regno (1840), failed. He repeated the success with Nabucco (1842), with which his link with politics began: the plot based on the Hebrew captivity in Babylon was compared to the Italians, under foreign domination in a good part of their territories. It includes the famous choir Va, pensiero. It was followed by I Lombardi alla prima crociata (1843). Ernani (1844) was his most fully Romantic work, based on a play by Victor Hugo. The following operas he composed were: I due Foscari (1844), Giovanna d'Arco (1845), Alzira (1845), Attila (1846) and I masnadieri (1847). In Macbeth (1847) he introduced an ugly-voiced soprano, befitting the character of Lady Macbeth, thus breaking with bel canto. It was his first work based on Shakespeare, of whom he was a great admirer. With Luisa Miller (1849) and Stiffelio (1850) he abandoned Romanticism in search of greater realism.

Alfredo Kraus and Maria Callas perform Libiamo ne' lieti calici, from the opera La traviata by Giuseppe Verdi

Next came his three masterpieces: Rigoletto (1851), Il trovatore (1853) and La Traviata (1853) are more realistic dramas, which stick more to the historical aspect. The former, based on Victor Hugo's play The King Amuses Himself, revolved around a superstitious jester who is cursed. It includes a motiv or evocative motif, a passage associated with some aspect of the opera, an antecedent of the Wagnerian leitmotif, which appears for example in the famous aria La donna è mobile. Il trovatore was based on a play by Antonio García Gutiérrez about a medieval troubadour. Composed in only thirty days, it contains a wide range of melodies, including the famous gypsy choir with its anvil strikes. La Traviata was based on Alexandre Dumas' The Lady of the Camellias, a work controversial for having a tubercular courtesan as its protagonist, with which Verdi anticipated fin-de-siècle verismo. It includes the famous duet Libiamo ne' lieti calici, also known as the "toast.".

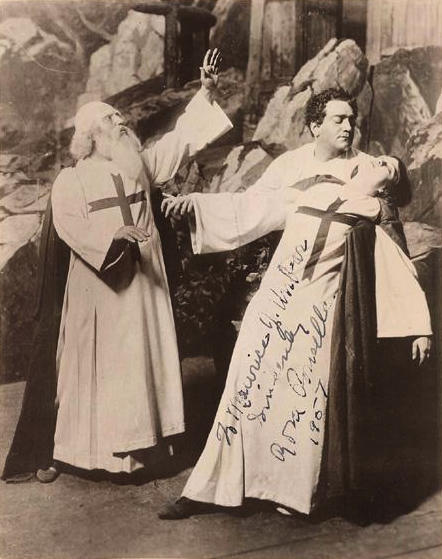
Rosa Ponselle and Enrico Caruso performing La forza del destino by Giuseppe Verdi

His next work was Les vêpres siciliennes (The Sicilian Vespers, 1855), premiered in Paris, based on a libretto of an opera that Donizetti left unfinished at his death (Le duc d'Albe). It was followed by Simon Boccanegra (1857), also based on a work by García Gutiérrez, an obscure opera that was not liked by the public. Un ballo in maschera (1859) was inspired by the assassination of Gustav III of Sweden during a masked ball; containing a regicide it was censored in Naples, so he had to premiere it in Rome. La forza del destino (1862), based on texts by Ángel de Saavedra and Friedrich von Schiller, was commissioned by the Imperial Theater of St. Petersburg, where it was premiered. Don Carlo (1867) was based on Schiller's drama Don Carlos, about the tragic fate of first-born son of Philip II of Spain. Aida (1871), set in Ancient Egypt, was one of his grandest productions. It was commissioned by the khedive of Egypt, Ismail Pasha, to inaugurate the Royal Opera House in Cairo, built to commemorate the opening of the Suez Canal; however, Verdi did not arrive in time and it was not premiered until two years later. His last two operas were based on Shakespeare plays: Otello (1887) and Falstaff (1893), both with librettos by Arrigo Boito. The former was the culmination of his great operas, while Falstaff – based on The Merry Wives of Windsor and Enrich IV – he composed as entertainment, his second comic work after the failure of Un giorno di regno. Verdi worked with several librettists (Temistocle Solera, Salvatore Cammarano, Francesco Maria Piave, Eugène Scribe), with whom he often had conflicts, as he was very demanding with the texts he set to music. He sometimes wrote his own plots, which he would then pass on to a librettist alone to versify.

After Verdi, the work of three composers who already foreshadowed a certain change of style that would materialize at the end of the century with verismo was outstanding: Arrigo Boito, Amilcare Ponchielli and Alfredo Catalani. Boito was a composer and librettist, author of the librettos of Verdi's last operas. His first opera was Mefistofele (1868), based on Goethe's Faust, which failed, so he temporarily abandoned composition and devoted himself to writing. However, after some revisions and thanks to Verdi's support, in 1875 he revived it, and this time it was a success. Two years later he began Nerone, on which he worked for forty years until his death. Completed by Vincenzo Tommasini and Arturo Toscanini, it was premiered in 1924. Ponchielli composed nine operas, although he succeeded with only one, La Gioconda (1876), based on a play by Victor Hugo adapted for libretto by Arrigo Boito. His first work, I promessi sposi (1856), had little success. I Lituani (1874) was well received, but did not remain in the operatic repertoire. He tried orientalism with Il figliuol prodigo (1880) and the comic genre with Marion Delorme (1885). Catalani evolved from an early Wagnerian influence towards verismo. His first opera, La falce (1875), was to a libretto by Arrigo Boito. It was followed by Elda (1880), transformed ten years later into Loreley. His greatest success was La Wally (1892), in a Germanizing style, with libretto by Luigi Illica.

Other Italian composers of the period were: Luigi Arditi (I briganti, 1840; Gulnara, 1848; La spia, 1856), Giovanni Bottesini (Cristoforo Colombo, 1848; Marion Delorme, 1864), Antonio Cagnoni (Don Bucefalo, 1847; Papà Martin, 1871), Michele Carafa (Jeanne d'Arc, 1821; Le nozze di Lammermoor, 1829), Carlo Coccia (Maria Stuarda, 1833; Caterina di Guisa, 1833), Filippo Marchetti (Ruy Blas, 1869), Francesco Morlacchi (Il barbiere di Siviglia, 1816; Tebaldo ed Isolina, 1820; La gioventù di Enrico V, 1823), Carlo Pedrotti (Fiorina, 1851; Tutti in maschera, 1869), Errico Petrella (Mario Visconti, 1854; Jone, 1858), Lauro Rossi (I falsi monetari, 1846; Il dominò nero, 1849; La sirena, 1855; Lo zingaro rivale, 1867) and Nicola Vaccai (Giulietta e Romeo, 1825).

==== Germanic countries ====
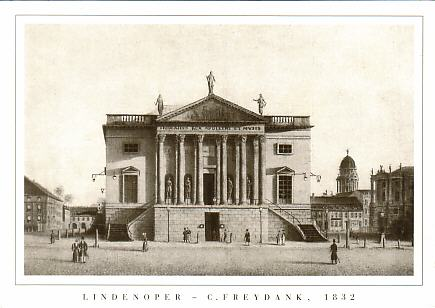
Staatsoper Unter den Linden, Berlin (1832)

In Germany, musical activity was distributed among the various states into which the nation was divided, until the unification of the country in 1871, which brought greater cultural patronage from the reigning house, the Hohenzollern, until then kings of Prussia. During this century, the hitherto predominant Italian influence was gradually abandoned, especially thanks to the work of Richard Wagner. In Austria, after the dissolution of the Holy Roman Empire, the Austro-Hungarian Empire was formed, also ruled by the Habsburgs. In 1869 the Wiener Staatsoper (Vienna State Opera) opened, which quickly became one of the most active centers of European opera; and, in 1898, the Wiener Volksoper (Vienna People's Opera), dedicated to operetta and ballet.

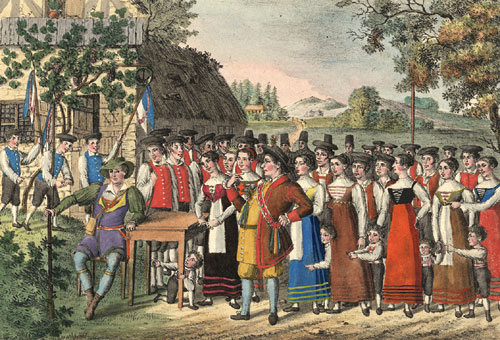
Performance of Der Freischütz by Carl Maria von Weber (1822)

Carl Maria von Weber is considered the creator of German national opera. He was director of the Dresden Opera House, from where he promoted several reforms in opera, such as the arrangement of the orchestra and choir, and a rehearsal schedule that encouraged performers to study the drama rather than the music. He wrote his first opera at the age of twelve, Der Macht der Liebe und des Weins (The Power of Love and Wine, 1798), which was followed by Das Waldmädchen (The Woodland Girl, 1800, which he later remodeled and retitled Silvana, 1810), Peter Schmoll und seine Nachbarn (Peter Schmoll and His Neighbors, 1803) and Abu Hassan (1811). His main opera is Der Freischütz (The Poacher, 1821), a theme based on folk legends: the whole action takes place in a forest, with elements alluding to nature, mystery, magic and populism, all the necessary ingredients for a romantic opera. With this opera, Weber created the German national opera and, at the same time, the first fully Romantic opera. His next opera, Euryanthe (1823), was not so successful. His last opera, Oberon (1826), commissioned in English by the Royal Opera in London, is based on Shakespeare's A Midsummer Night's Dream. Except in Germany, his operas are not widely performed today, but his overtures still enjoy fair fame as symphonic pieces.

Notable in early German Romanticism were the works of Johann Simon Mayr, Ludwig Spohr and Heinrich Marschner. Mayr studied in Italy, where Piccinni encouraged him to compose opera. His first success was Saffo (1794), which was followed by Ginevra di Scozia (1801). His masterpiece was Medea in Corinto (1813), after which his operas were performed throughout Europe and in New York. His work influenced Rossini. Spohr first achieved success with Faust (1816), the first operatic adaptation of Goethe's play. Musical director of the Frankfurt Opera, he premiered there Zemire und Azor (1819). He then moved to Kassel, where he developed the rest of his career: Jessonda (1823), Der Berggeist (The Spirit of the Mountain, 1825), Pietro Albano (1827), Der Alchymist (The Alchemist, 1830). Marschner was fortunate that Weber premiered his first opera in Dresden: Heinrich IV und d'Aubigné (1818). After some failures, he reaped a great success with Der Vampyr (1828), based on The Vampire (1819) by John William Polidori, which denotes the influence of Weber's Der Freischütz. His third success was Hans Heiling (1833), based on a Bohemian legend.

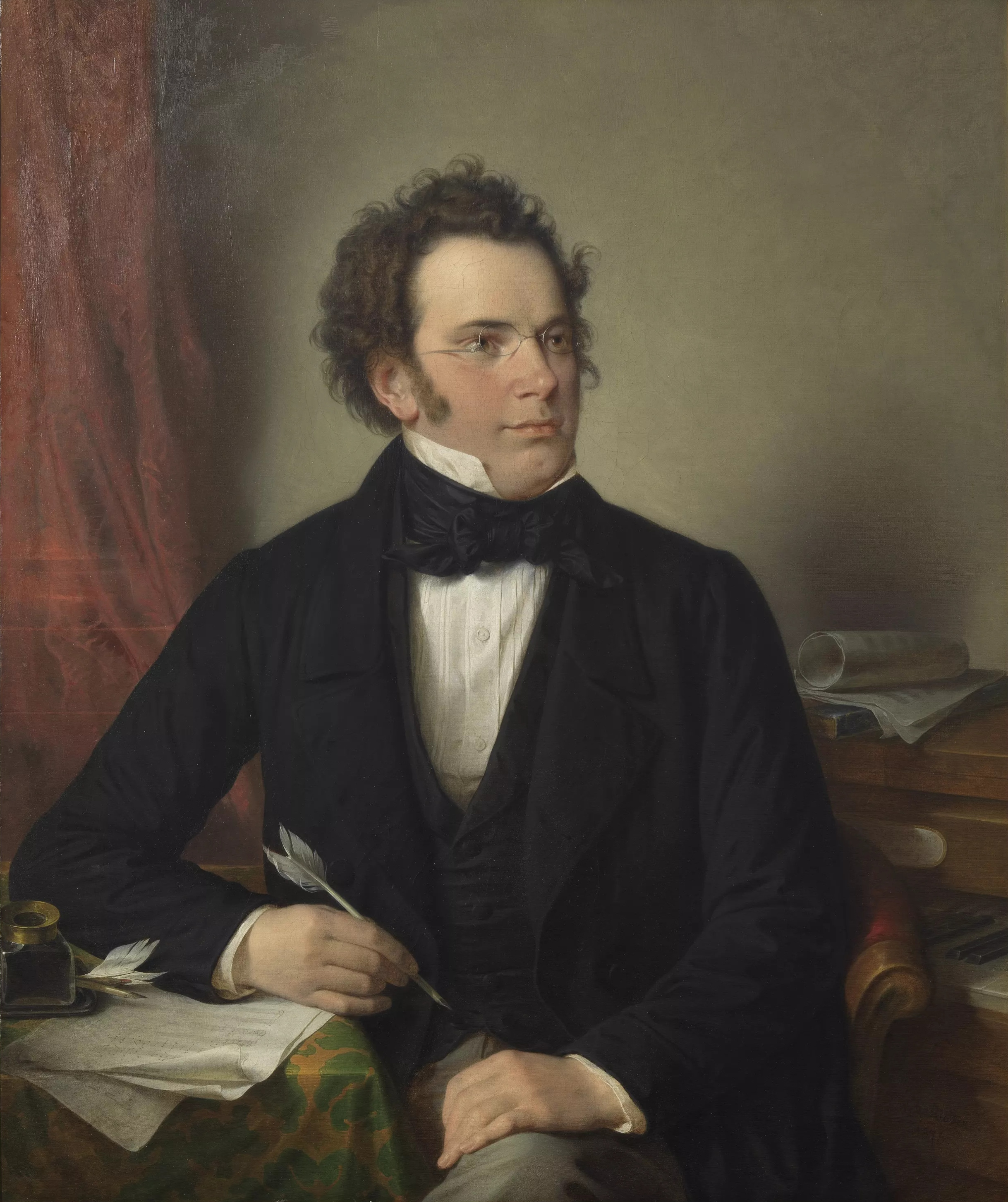
Franz Schubert

The Austrian Franz Schubert was one of the most prominent Romantic composers, famous for his lieder. At the age of seventeen he composed the "magic opera" Des Teufels Lustschloß (The demon's pleasure palace, 1814). It was followed by the operetta Die Zwillingsbrüder (The Twin Brothers, 1819). He turned to melodrama with Die Zauberharfe (The Magic Harp, 1820), which was a failure. Alfonso und Estrella (1822) and Fierrabras (1823) were never premiered in the composer's lifetime, despite the beauty of their melodies; in general, Schubert's plots tended to fail him, not living up to his music. His greatest success was Die Verschworenen (The Conspirators, 1823), based on Aristophanes's Lysistrata.

Other famous Romantic composers, such as Felix Mendelssohn, Robert Schumann and Franz Liszt, occasionally dabbled in opera. Mendelssohn composed operas mostly in his youth, with singspiele such as Die Soldatenliebschaft (The Soldier's Love, 1820), Die beiden Pädagogen (The Two Educators, 1821), Die wandernden Komödianten (The Wandering Comedians, 1822), Der Onkel aus Boston, oder Die beiden Neffen (The Uncle from Boston, or the Two Nephews, 1823) and Die Hochzeit des Camacho (Camacho's Wedding, 1825). He also composed Die Heimkehr aus der Fremde (The Return of the Stranger, 1829), a liederspiel, a minor genre of singspiel based on songs (lieder). Schumann, who excelled primarily as a symphonic musician, composed a single opera, Genoveva (1850). Liszt, of Hungarian origin, was in addition to being a composer a virtuoso pianist and conductor. He also produced a single opera, Don Sanche (1825), in one act. The novelist Ernst Theodor Amadeus Hoffmann, also a composer, made several singspiele, such as Dirna (1809), Aurora (1813) and Undine (1816).

Die letzte rose (The last rose), from the opera Martha (1847) by Friedrich von Flotow

The following figures of the period were Albert Lortzing, Carl Otto Nicolai and Friedrich von Flotow. Lortzing was a composer and conductor, almost self-taught. His first work was Ali Pascha von Janina (1824). In 1837 he premiered two comic operas: Die beiden Schützen (The Two Squires) and Zar und Zimmermann (Tsar and Carpenter). From 1839 he composed one opera per year, including Hans Sachs (1841), Der Wildschütz (The Forest Hunter, 1842), Undine (1845) and Der Waffenschmied (The Master Gunsmith, 1846). His work was still largely heir to Mozart. Nicolai was an organist in Rome, where he became fond of opera. He combined his activity as a composer with that of conductor, mainly at the Vienna Hofoper. His first success was Enrico II (1839). In 1849 – the year of his death – he achieved his masterpiece: Die lustigen Weiber von Windsor (The Merry Wives of Windsor), based on Shakespeare's homonymous comedy. Flotow studied in Paris, so his plays followed the French style. He was famous for his catchy tunes, as in Alessandro Stradella (1844), his first international success. Settling in Vienna, he premiered Martha (1847), his masterpiece, which included the folk song Die letzte rose (The Last Rose). He was an eclectic composer, who brought together the grace of French opéra-comique, Italian lyricism and rich Germanic orchestration.

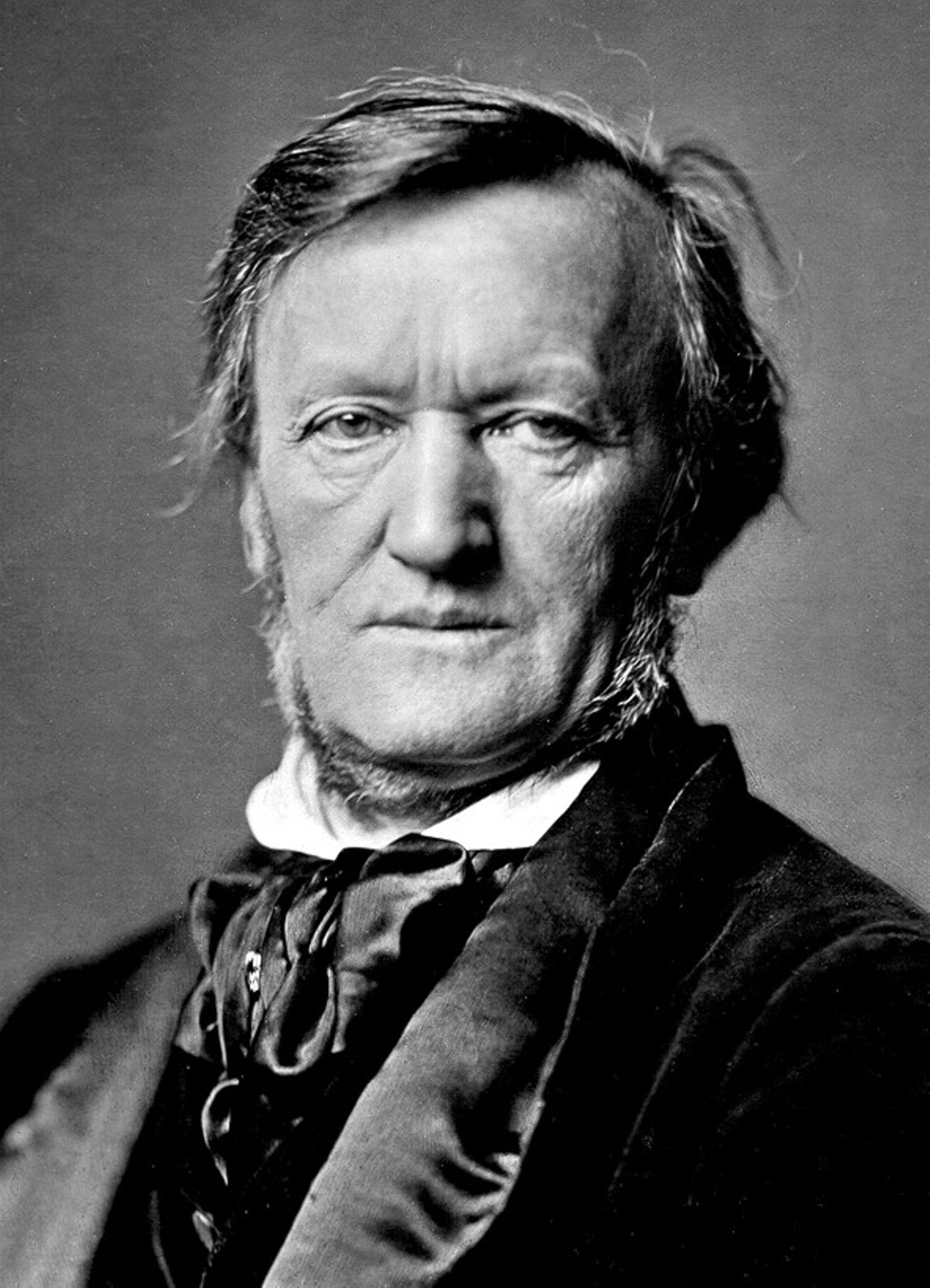
Richard Wagner

In a second generation, the figure of Richard Wagner stood out. He was a composer, conductor and music critic in the Gazette musicale. He gave to the opera heights of great brilliance, with the pretension of making a total work of art (Gesamtkunstwerk) that united music, poetry, drama, philosophy, scenography and other arts, theory that he embodied in his essay Opera and drama (1851). Wagner disliked the term opera, preferring musical drama (Musikdrama). He abandoned the singspiel for the symphony orchestra, following the model of Giacomo Meyerbeer's grandiloquent opera. He renewed the operatic orchestra, to which he added the Wagnerian tuba. In his Nibelungen tetralogy he went so far as to form an orchestra of one hundred and fifteen instruments. Such orchestral power presented serious difficulties for the human voice to live up to, so his performers needed special training, which led to the appearance of two new vocal figures: the Wagnerian soprano and the heroic or Wagnerian tenor (heldentenor). Critical of Italian opera, which he considered contrived and conventional, in his works he suppressed the aria, as well as the concept of "closed numbers", of episodes isolated from the rest, creating instead works of a continuous flow, an integrated whole running from beginning to end with a single musical concept; even the intermissions were connected to the rest of the composition. This system is called "transcomposition" (German: Durchkomposition), and was used by numerous composers since Wagner. He was so meticulous with his performances that he was the first to darken the hall and focus the spectator's attention on the stage. Likewise, he forbade applause during the performance, which was allowed only at the end. Another of Wagner's innovations was the leitmotif, a passage where he associated a certain musical motif with a recurring idea (a character, a feeling, an object, a scenic situation). He developed this concept while composing the first three parts of The Ring of the Nibelung and applied it from then on to all his operas. Wagner wrote his own librettos, so he controlled all aspects of the work.

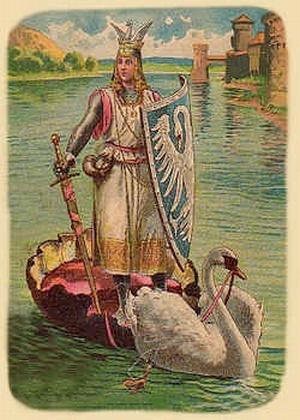
Postcard with the image of Lohengrin

After a first attempt at an unfinished opera (Die Hochzeit [The Wedding], 1832) and another that he did not premiere (Die Feen [The Fairies], 1833), his first premiere, Das Liebesverbot (The Prohibition of Love, 1836), was a failure. After traveling in Norway, London and Paris, he composed Rienzi (1842) and Der fliegende Holländer (The Flying Dutchman, 1843). This opera began a series of Germanic-themed works generally set in the Middle Ages, with romantic loves featuring a recurring moral: redemption by love through death. In 1843 he was appointed chapel master in Dresden. In 1845 he premiered Tannhäuser, about a medieval troubadour. It was followed by Lohengrin (1850), about the quest for the Holy Grail, the first in which he eliminated arias and recitatives, with continuous melodic scenes. After participating in the Liberal Revolution of 1849, he was forced into exile, so he settled in Zürich (Switzerland). His next opera, Tristan und Isolde (1865), was a difficult work for the public, where he introduced harmonic dissonances that confused the viewer, with a melody that is lost in infinity.

Ride of the Valkyries, performed by the American Symphony Orchestra

His next project was the tetralogy Der Ring des Nibelungen (The Ring of the Nibelung), consisting of Das Rheingold (Rhine Gold, 1851–1854), Die Walküre (The Valkyrie, 1851–1856), Siegfried (Siegfried, 1851–1857 and 1864–1871) and Götterdämmerung (Twilight of the Gods, 1848–1852 and 1869–1874), which he was able to develop thanks to the patronage of Ludwig II of Bavaria. Based on the medieval epic Song of the Nibelungs, the initial approach for a single opera was extended to four due to the vastness of the plot. Wagner moved away from the legendary tale and adapted it to his anarchist ideal, in which myth equated to social change, to the universal struggle between reactionary forces and humanist evolution. (Note: George Bernard Shaw, in his essay The Perfect Wagnerite. A Commentary on the Nibelung's Ring (1923), was the first to point out a "double structure" in The Ring of the Nibelung, where the myth of medieval origin would be an allegory of the capitalist system and a critique of liberal economics and the struggle for power, while signaling the death of religion and the triumph of atheism.) For this he was also inspired by the Nordic Eddas, from which he took the alliterative verse stabreim. The tetralogy took him twenty-six years of work, and its performance brought him serious difficulties because of the enormity of the works: it was not until 1876 that he premiered the complete cycle at the Festspielhaus in Bayreuth, a new theater sponsored by him for the reproduction of his operas.

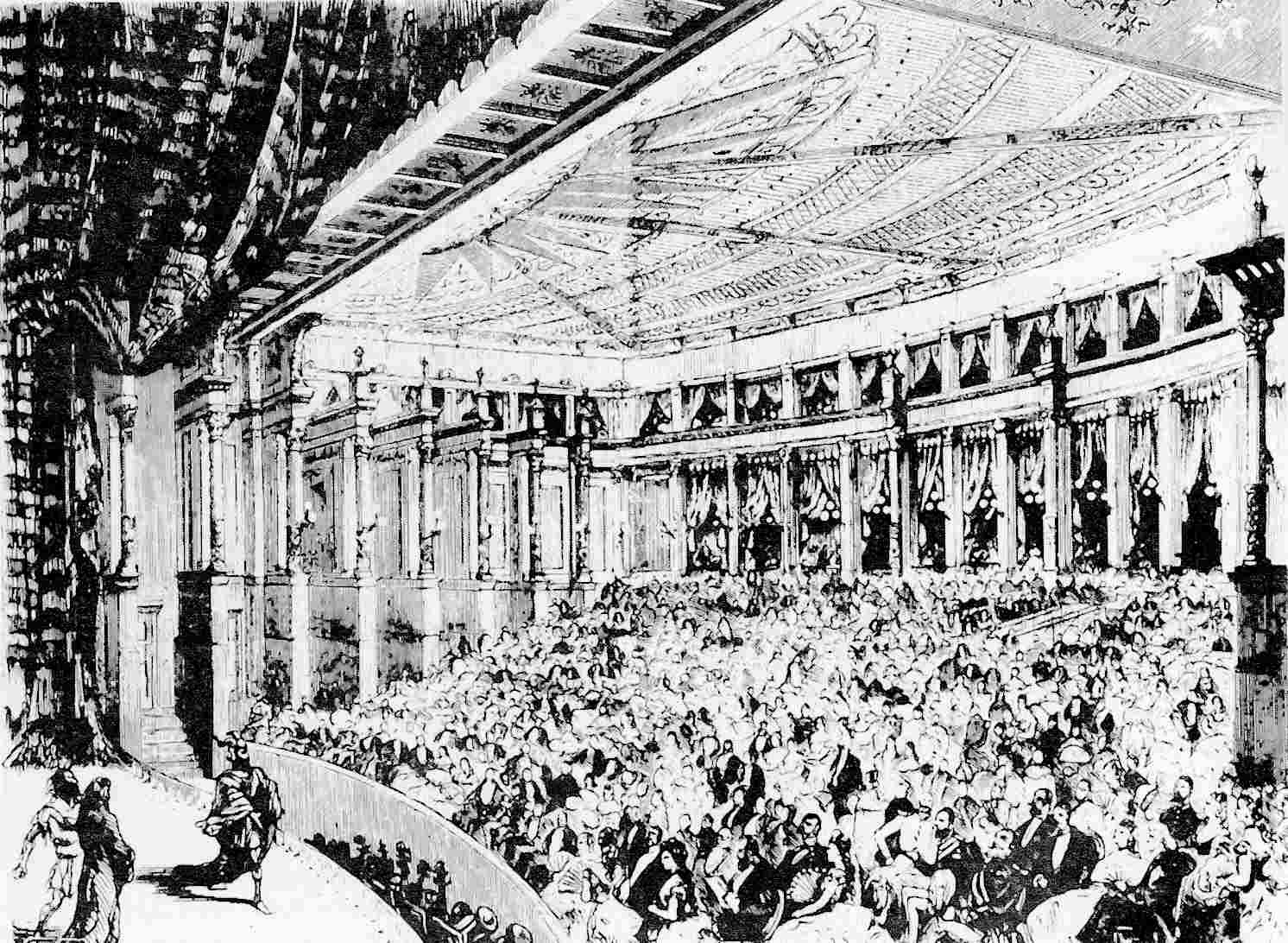
First performance of Der Ring des Nibelungen, Bayreuth Festspielhaus (1876)

He combined this project with Die Meistersinger von Nürnberg (The Master Singers of Nuremberg, 1868), described as a comedy, but not in the ordinary sense of the term, but as an evocation of the bitter human comedy. His last work was Parsifal (1882), about the character of the Arthurian cycle, which was notable for a diaphanous music that anticipated to some extent musical impressionism.

Notable among the latter figures was Peter Cornelius. He was an admirer of Wagner, but rejected his influence and was determined to find a path of his own. He focused on comic opera, intending to create a new German comic genre more serious and profound than the traditional singspiel. Inspired by the traditional Arabian tales of The Thousand and One Nights he composed and wrote Der Barbier von Bagdad (The Barber of Bagdad, 1858), which failed. He later made the historical drama Der Cid (The Cid, 1865).

Overture to Die Leichte Kavallerie (Light Cavalry, 1866), by Franz von Suppé

It is also worth naming among the composers of romantic opera from the Germanic sphere: Franz Joseph Gläser (Des Adlers Horst [The Eagles' Nest], 1832), Karl Goldmark (Die Königin von Saba [The Queen of Sheba], 1875), Conradin Kreutzer (Das Nachtlager in Granada [The Inn at Granada], 1834) and Johann Peter Pixis (Der Zauberspruch [The Magic Tale], 1822; Bibiana, 1829; Die Sprache des Herzens [The Language of the Heart], 1836).

In the second half of the century, especially in Austria, there was a revival of operetta, which enjoyed great popularity in Viennese society. Its most prominent representative was Johann Strauss II, violinist, conductor and composer, a member of a family of musicians famous above all for their specialization in waltzes. He attempted the serious genre with Ritter Pásmán (1892), but was most famous for his operettas: Indigo und die vierzig Räuber (Indigo and the Forty Thieves, 1871), Die Fledermaus (The Bat, 1874), Eine Nacht in Venedig (A Night in Venice, 1883), Der Zigeunerbaron (The Gypsy Baron, 1885) and Wiener Blut (Viennese Blood, 1899). The Austro-Hungarian Franz Lehár was a conductor at the Theater an der Wien. He excelled in operetta with a witty, energetic and imaginative style: Wiener Frauen (Viennese Women, 1902), Der Rastelbinder (1902), Die lustige Witwe (The Merry Widow, 1905). Franz von Suppé, of Croatian origin, was a composer and conductor, author of operettas some of which remembered especially for their overtures: Die Schöne Galathée (The Beautiful Galatea, 1865), Die Leichte Kavallerie (Light Cavalry, 1866), Fatinitza (1876), Boccaccio (1879). Other exponents were: Carl Millöcker (Der Bettelstudent [The Beggar Student], 1882) Robert Stolz (Schön Lorchen [The Beautiful Lorchen], 1903), Oscar Straus (Der tapfere Soldat [The Chocolate Soldier], 1908) and Carl Zeller (Der Vogelhändler [The Bird Seller], 1891).

==== Other countries ====
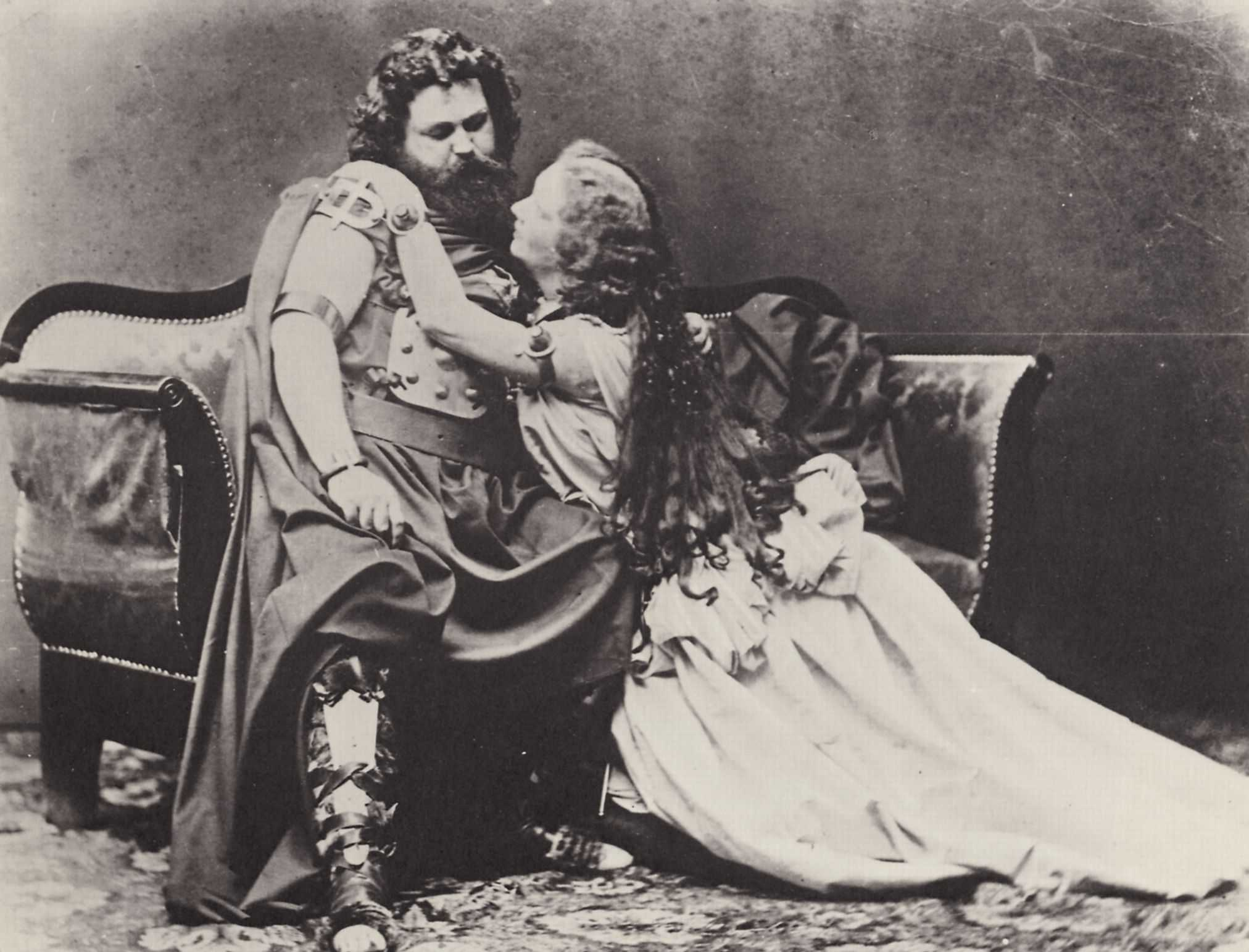
Ludwig and Malwine Schnorr von Carolsfeld as Tristan und Isolde, Munich (1865)

In Spain, opera was directly influenced by Italy, to the point that the production of local authors was in Italian. The work of Ramón Carnicer, author of operas of Rossinian influence, although with some Mozartian reminiscence, stood out: Adele di Lusignano (1819), Elena e Costantino (1821), Don Giovanni Tenorio (1822), Elena e Malvina (1829), Cristoforo Colombo (1831), Eufemio di Messina (1832), Ismailia (1838). Likewise, Marià Obiols was a disciple of Saverio Mercadante and wrote in Italian Odio ed amore (1837), which he premiered at La Scala in Milan. He was later director of the Conservatory of the Liceu de Barcelona and composed Laura Debellan and Edita di Belcourt (1874). Baltasar Saldoni was the last composer to use librettos by Metastasio: Ipermestra (1848), Cleonice, regina di Siria (1840). Mention should also be made of: Vicenç Cuyàs (La Fattuchiera, 1838), Eduard Domínguez (La dama del castello, 1845), Nicolau Manent (Gualtiero di Monsonís, 1857) and Nicolau Guanyabens (Arnaldo di Erill, 1859).

The English John Fane, founder of the Royal Academy of Music in London, left works in Italian: Fedra (1824), Il torneo (1829), L'assedio di Belgrado (1830).

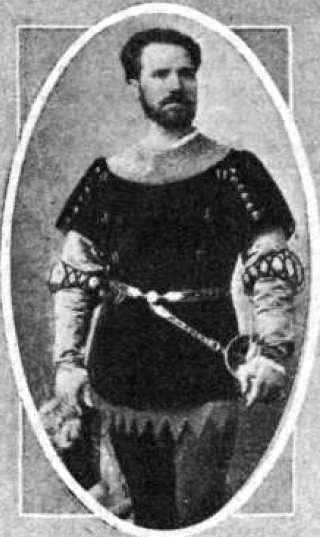
Julián Gayarre in his debut at La Scala in Milan in 1876

In Russia, where during the reign of Catherine II the taste for Italian opera had predominated, with Alexander I it was French opera that was in vogue. Even so, the Italian Catterino Cavos, installed in the country, was appointed director of the Imperial Theater of St. Petersburg and premiered several operas, such as Ilya Bogatyr (1807) and Ivan Susanin (1815). Russian composers include: Stepan Davydov (Lesta, 1803), Alekséi Titov (Yam, ili Pochtovaja stancija [Yam, or the Post Office Station], 1805) and Alekséi Verstovski (Askol'dova mogila [Askold's Tomb], 1835).

In Poland, Józef Ksawery Elsner, a teacher of Frédéric Chopin, was the author of some operas, including Andromeda (1807), composed in honor of Napoleon Bonaparte. Karol Kurpiński was director of the Warsaw Opera from 1824 to 1840. He composed more than twenty operas, most notably Zamek na Czorsztynie (The Castle of Czorsztyn, 1819).

The Czech Vojtěch Jírovec (also called in German Adalbert Gyrowetz) developed his work between Vienna, Naples, Paris and London. He composed in Italian Il finto Stanislao (1818) and, in German, Agnes Sorel (1806), Der Augenartz (The Oculist, 1811) and Hans Sachs im vorgerückten Alter (Hans Sachs at an Advanced Age, 1834).

==== Romantic Singers ====
Among the lyrical interpreters of Romanticism it is worth remembering:

- Isabella Colbran, Spanish mezzo-soprano, Rossini's wife, in many of whose operas she performed, considered one of the first "divas"
- Giovanni Davide, Italian tenor, for whom Rossini wrote some roles
- Gilbert Duprez, French tenor, leading artist of the Paris Opera for twelve years and first tenor to ever sing a chest high C in public
- Cornélie Falcon, French soprano of short but brilliant career
- Manuel del Pópulo Vicente García, Spanish tenor and composer, creator of many roles in Rossini's works, patriarch of a family of singers
- Maria Malibran, Spanish soprano, famous for her remarkable vocal versatility and fervent artistry. Daughter of Manuel García
- Pauline Viardot, Spanish mezzo-soprano known for her beautiful and flexible voice and for her artistic sense . Daughter of Manuel García.
- Julián Gayarre, Spanish tenor with a wide international career
- Giulia Grisi, Italian soprano of international success
- Jenny Lind, Swedish soprano and prima donna, one of the most famous of the century
- Jean-Blaise Martin, French baritone who for his register of one octave more in falsetto gave name to the so-called baritone Martin
- Giuditta Pasta, Italian soprano considered one of the best exponents of bel canto
- Adelina Patti, Italian soprano and diva, considered the best of the last quarter of the 19th century
- Fanny Persiani, Italian soprano of light and attractive voice. Most remembered for creating the title role in Lucia di Lammermoor
- Jean de Reszke, Polish tenor of attractive physique and elegant artistry perfectly suited to romantic roles
- Giovanni Battista Rubini, Italian tenor of sweet, but powerful voice
- Ludwig Schnorr von Carolsfeld, German tenor, the first heldentenor Wagnerian
- Wilhelmine Schröder-Devrient, German soprano who was noted for her sentimentality
- Teresa Stolz, Czech soprano who excelled especially in Verdi roles
- Francesco Tamagno, Italian tenor famous for his remarkably powerful high notes
- Enrico Tamberlick, Italian tenor with a powerful voice and vibrant tone
- Giovanni Battista Velluti, the last castrato of renown

=== Nationalism ===
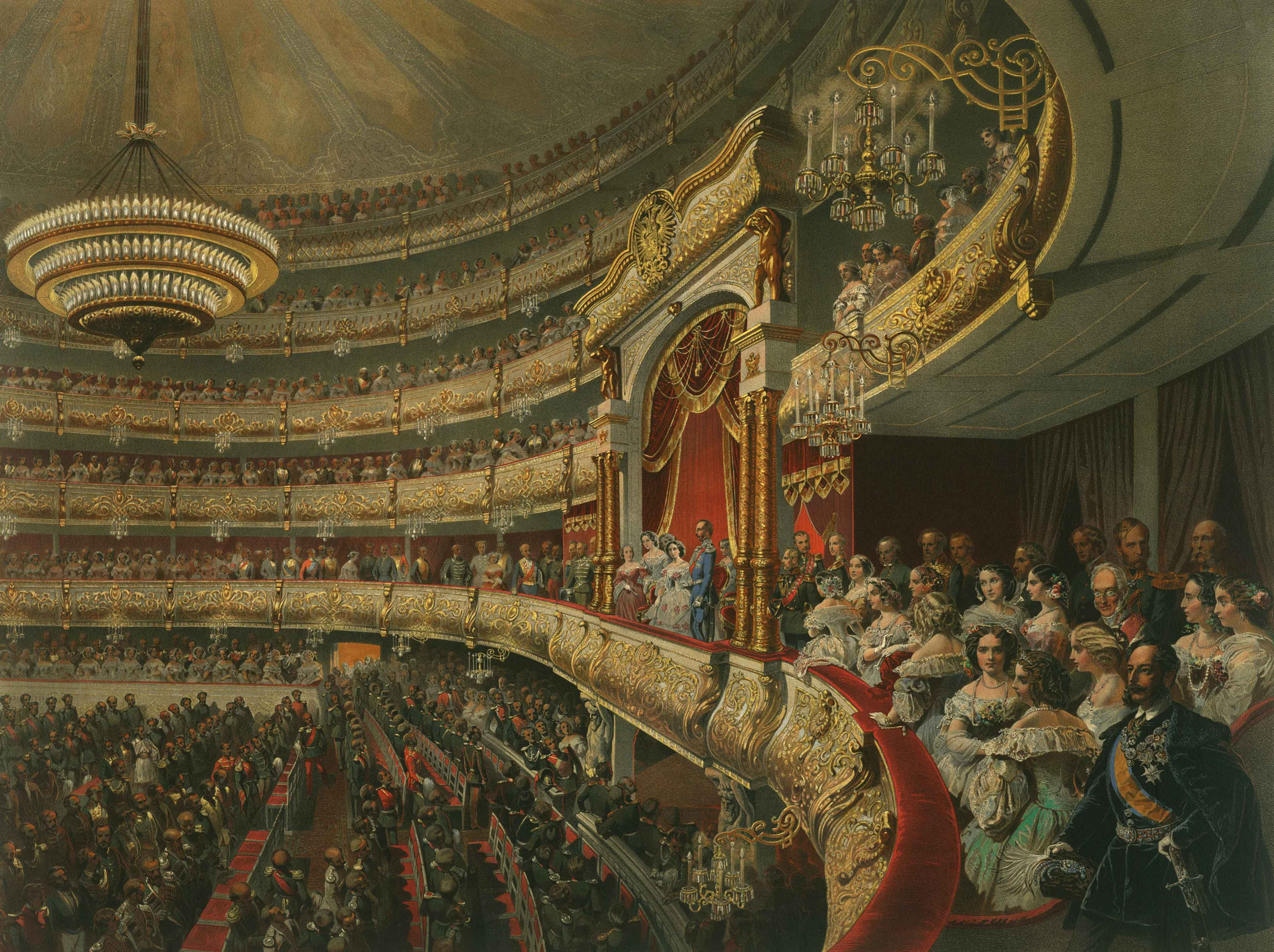
Performance at the Bolshoi Theatre in Moscow (1856)

In the second half of the 19th century—especially since the liberal revolutions of 1848—numerous nations that had not previously excelled in music experienced a musical renaissance, enhanced by the nationalist sentiments associated with Romanticism and political liberalism. In general, most of these compositions were linked to musical Romanticism, though often with a national component based on the folk and popular tradition of each of these countries. Most plots were historical and national—Rimsky-Korsakov devoted thirteen of his fifteen operas to Russian themes—and vernacular languages were introduced into the operatic texts. Several of these nations did not enjoy political autonomy at the time, so that opera—and culture in general—were identity factors of national vindication. These movements lasted in many cases until the beginning of the 20th century.

==== Russia ====
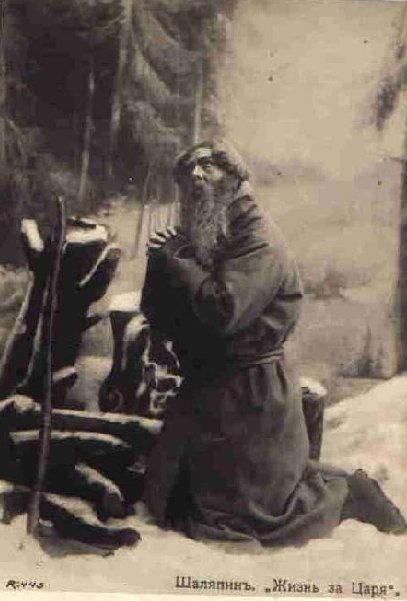
Feodor Chaliapin as Ivan Susanin in Zhizn za tsaryá (A Life for the Tsar, 1836), by Mikhail Glinka

The Russian music was noted for the colorful timbres, the preference for brass instruments, the tendency to the minor mode and a melancholic and expressive spirit, as well as a strong orientalist influence, especially Arabic and Chinese. They also liked ballets and folk dances. In the 19th century Russian opera went through three phases: during the absolutist reign of Nicholas I, opera was to serve monarchical propaganda, as in Glinka's work; during the reign of Alexander II, in which certain reforms were introduced, opera presented a more popular component and tended to social realism, whose paradigm was Boris Godunov by Músorgski; the third, with the return to autocracy of Alexander III, coincides with the work of Tchaikovsky. On the other hand, in Russia arose the opéra dialogué, a genre of recitative singing occasionally elevated to arioso, but renouncing the aria, choruses and ensembles. (Note: Its two main exponents were Kámenni gost (The Stone Guest), by Aleksandr Dargomizhski, and Zhenitba (The Wedding), by Modest Músorgski, both unfinished. It also had this format partially the first version of Músorgski's Boris Godunov (the Ur-Boris or "initial Boris") Menéndez Torrellas (2013, p. 349).)

The seat of the Imperial Opera was at the Bolshoi Kamenny Theater in St. Petersburg, opened in 1783, until 1862 when it was moved to the Mariinsky Theater. In 1825, the Bolshoi Theatre in Moscow opened. In the business field, it is also worth noting the productions staged by Sergey Diaghilev and the Theater of the Arts founded in 1898 by Vladimir Nemirovich-Danchenko and Konstantin Stanislavski, great innovators in the fields of acting and scenography.

Mikhail Glinka is considered the "father of Russian music." His first hit was Zhizn za tsaryá (A Life for the Tsar, 1836), the story of a Russian folk hero, Ivan Susanin. It featured French and Italian influences, but introduced distinctly Russian melodies, based on folk folklore, as in the use of the balalaika. In 1842 he premiered Ruslan and Liudmila, on a poem by Aleksandr Pushkin, which inaugurated the genre of the so-called Russian "magical opera".

Aleksandr Dargomizhski, a friend of Glinka's, was similarly committed to creating a national opera grounded in Russian folklore. His first opera, Esmeralda (1840), was based on The Hunchback of Notre Dame by Victor Hugo. His masterpiece was Rusalka (1856), with lyrical melodies based on the patterns of the Russian language. He left unfinished his last opera, Kámenni gost (The Stone Guest), on a tragedy by Aleksandr Pushkin, which was completed by Cui and Rimski-Kórsakov, and premiered in 1872.

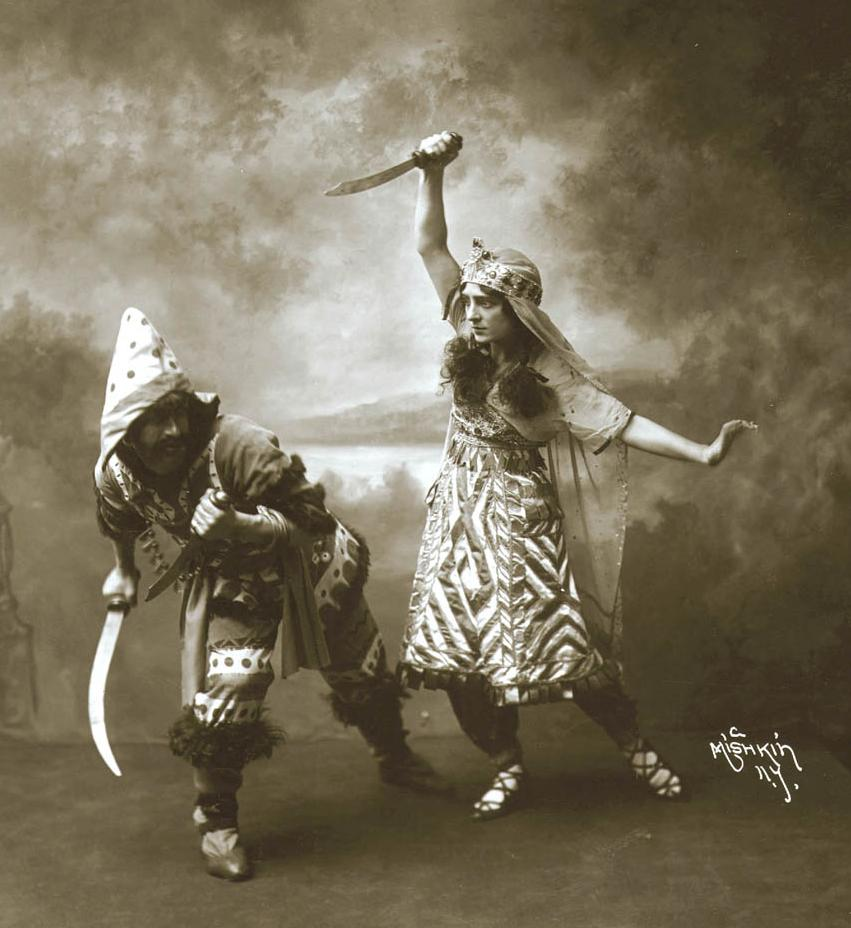
Giuseppe Bonfiglio and Rosina Galli in the Polovtsian Dances from the opera Kniaz Igor (Prince Igor) by Aleksandr Borodin (1915)

The next impulse came from a group of composers known as The Five, interested in composing a specifically Russian music. It consisted of Mili Balákirev, Aleksandr Borodín, César Cui, Modest Músorgski and Nikolái Rimski-Kórsakov, although the former did not venture into opera. Borodin was a chemist and practiced music as a hobby. He completed only one opera, Bogatyri (1867), and left unfinished what would be his masterpiece, Kniaz Igor (Prince Igor, 1869–1870, completed between 1874 and 1887 and premiered in 1890). César Cui was an engineer by profession. He was the author of several operas, such as Kavkazski plénnik (The Prisoner of the Caucasus, 1883) and Kot v sapogaj (Puss in Boots, 1915), not performed in the current operatic repertoire. Modest Músorgski, of aristocratic origin, began a military career, which he abandoned to devote himself to music. Between 1868 and 1869 he composed his masterpiece, Boris Godunov, based on a text by Aleksandr Pushkin, in which he introduced his characteristic declamatory style based on Russian colloquial language. Between 1872 and 1880 he composed Jovánschina (The Jovanski Case), which was completed by Rimsky-Kórsakov. Both are operas of difficult performance, so they are often offered only in their orchestral version. His last opera was Soróchinskaya yármarka (The Sorochinets Fair, 1876–1881), of comic genre, which he also left unfinished. Rimsky-Korsakov was a naval officer and amateur composer. He was a pupil of Balakirev, and was noted for his mastery of the orchestra and his evocative harmonies, despite which he did not triumph much in the West. After operas like Snegúrochka (The Snow Maiden, 1882), Mlada (1892), Noch péred Rózhdestvom (Christmas Night, 1895), Mozart and Salieri (1898), Sadkó (1898), Tsárskaya nevesta (The Tsar's Bride, 1899), Tsare Saltane (Tsar Saltan, 1900) and Skazániye o nevídimom grade Kítezhe (The Invisible City of Kítezh, 1907), his greatest success was Zolotoi Petushok (The Golden Cockerel, 1909), based on a play by Pushkin, premiered after his death.

Scene from Tatiana's letter from the opera Evgeny Onegin (1878), by Pyotr Tchaikovsky, performed by Claudia Muzio (1920)

Another outstanding exponent was Pyotr Tchaikovsky, a character tormented by his homosexuality and with a tendency to depression, but of great sensitivity as a composer. His first opera was Voivode (1868), of which he was not satisfied. With Opríchnik (The guard, 1874) and Kuznets Vakula (Vakula the blacksmith, 1876) he began his personal dramatic style, characterized by lyrical music, dances and folk melodies, with a certain orientalist taste. With these parameters he composed Evgeni Onegin (1879), his masterpiece. It was followed by Orleanskaya deva (The Maid of Orleans, 1881), Mazepa (1884), Charodeyka (The Sorceress, 1887), Píkovaya dama (The Lady in Spades, 1890) and Iolanta (1891). Tchaikovsky was the most Europeanist of the Russian composers of the period, as well as the most Romantic – he is often referred to as the last Romantic.

Other exponents were: Aleksandr Aliabiev (Burya, 1835; Rusalka, 1843), Anton Arensky (Son na Volge, 1891; Raphael, 1894), Mikhail Ippolytov-Ivanov (Ruth, 1887), Anton Rubinstein (The Demon, 1875) and Aleksandr Serov (Judith, 1863; Rogneda, 1865).

In Ukraine, belonging to Russia until 1991, Mykola Lysenko was the leading Ukrainian-language composer: Natalka Poltavka (1889), Taras Bulba (1890). His work was admired by Tchaikovsky and Rimsky-Korsakov, but was not widely disseminated because he refused to have it translated into Russian.

==== Czechoslovakia ====
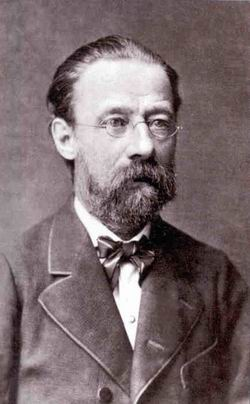
Bedřich Smetana

In the 19th century, Bohemia (present-day Czech Republic) and Slovakia were part of the Austro-Hungarian Empire. The liberal revolutions of this period – especially that of 1848 – awakened the yearning for independence in these regions, which was stifled. It was not until the end of World War I that the state of Czechoslovakia, now divided between the Czech Republic and Slovakia, was formed. Czech opera started from the German singspiel, with a popular and folkloric component. Its first exponent was František Škroup, author of the first opera in Czech: Dráteník (The Boilermaker, 1829).

Overture to Prodaná nevěsta (The Bartered Bride, 1870), by Bedřich Smetana, performed by the London Philharmonic Orchestra (1930)

The father of Czech nationalism was Bedřich Smetana. Director of the Prague National Theater, he showed great gifts for orchestration and dramatization, and adapted the cadences of the Czech language to music. For this reason he is considered the first Czech national composer, a circumstance somewhat diluted, however, by his strong Wagnerian influence. His first opera was Braniboři v Čechách (The Brandenburgers in Bohemia, 1866). His main success was Prodaná nevěsta (The Sold Bride, 1866), of comic genre. It was followed by Dálibor (1868), Tajemství (The Secret, 1878), Libuše (1881) and Čertova stěna (The Devil's Wall, 1882).

Antonín Dvořák was an outstanding symphonist, author of ten operas that continued the path begun by Smetana. He began with comic works, such as Šelma sedlák (The Sly Peasant, 1877). His masterpiece was Rusalka (1901), with libretto by fellow composer Jaroslav Kvapil, a lyrical love story far removed from the explosive realist dramas that triumphed at the time.

Zdeněk Fibich combined traditional Czech music with the influence of Wagner, Weber and Schumann. He set to music works by Schiller, Byron and Shakespeare, as well as from Greek (Hippodamia, 1889) and Czech mythology (Šárka, 1897).

Leoš Janáček can be considered a late representative of Czech nationalism, although his work already enters modernity and, because of the quality of his works, he can be considered a universal composer. A native of Moravia, he incorporated in his works the folk melodies typical of that region, with a preference for simple plots about ordinary people. His first success was Jenůfa (1904), a story of rural atmosphere. After a few years of unsuccessful plays, his greatest successes came in the 1920s: Káťa Kabanová (1921), Příhody lišky bystroušky (The Cunning Fox, 1924) and Věc Makropulos (The Makropoulos Case, 1926), inspired by his obsessive love for the young Kamila Stösslová. He died while working on his last work, Z mrtvého domu (From the House of the Dead, 1928).

Other composers were: Karel Bendl (Černohorci [The Montenegrins], 1881; Karel Škréta, 1883), Eduard Nápravník (Nizhegorodski, 1868; Harold, 1886; Dubrovski, 1895; Francesca da Rimini, 1902), Vítězslav Novák (Karlstejn, 1916; Lucerne [The Lantern], 1923) and Otakar Ostrčil (Vlasty Skon [The Death of Vlasta], 1904; Honzovo království [The Kingdom of Johnny], 1934).

==== Hungary ====
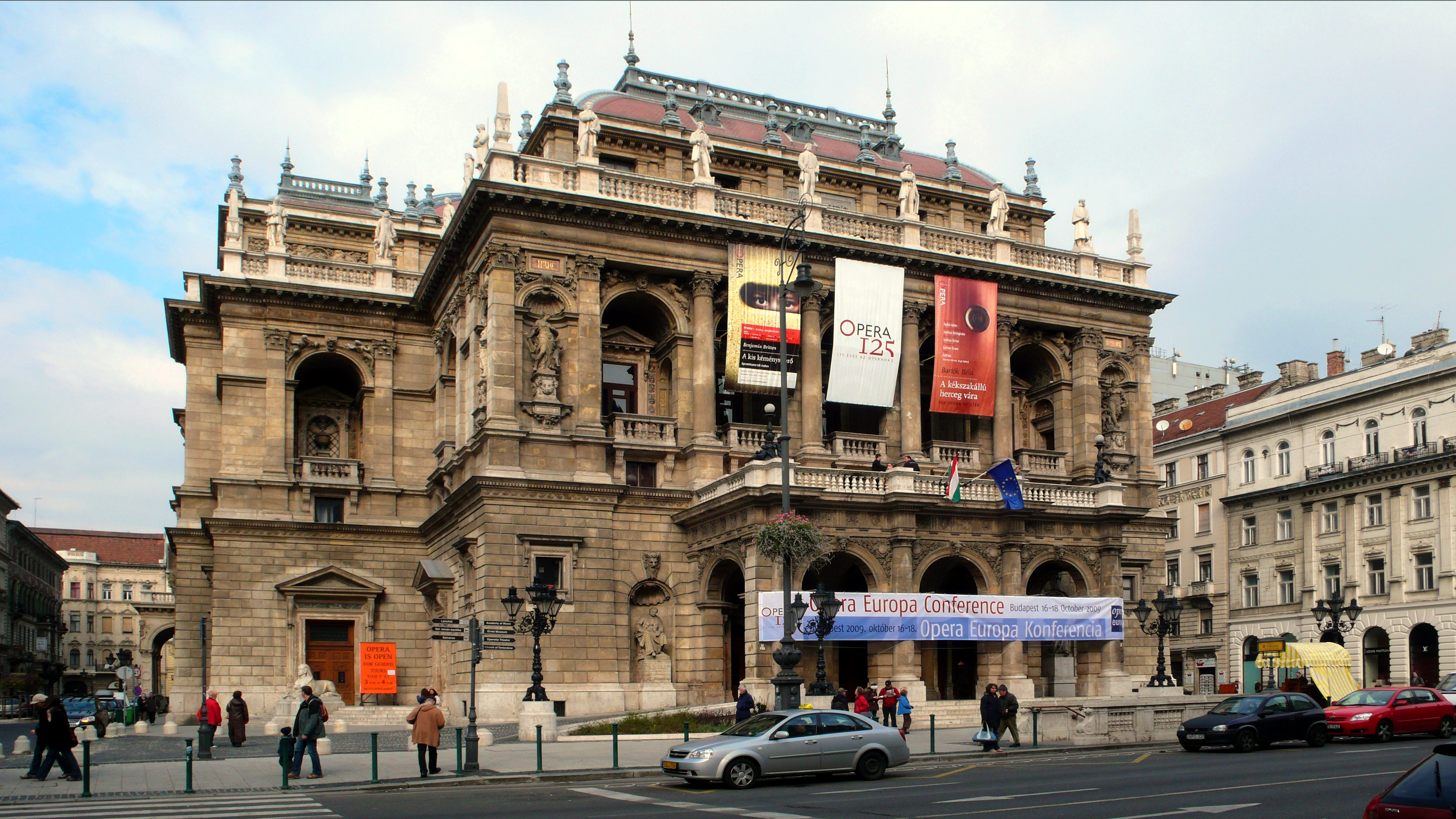
Hungarian State Opera of Budapest

Hungary was part of the Austro-Hungarian Empire during the 19th century and did not achieve independence until after the First World War. His political ties brought him into close contact with the operatic environment of Vienna, the capital of the empire. In 1884 the Operaház (National Opera) in Budapest was inaugurated. The first surviving Hungarian opera is Béla Király Futása (The Flight of King Béla, 1822), by József Ruzitska. Other pioneers were András Bartay (Csel [The Trick], 1839) and Franz Doppler (Benyovszky, 1847).

Ferenc Erkel is considered the father of Hungarian national opera. He was a conductor and pianist as well as a composer and, in 1853, founded the Budapest Philharmonic Orchestra. His first opera was Bátori Mária (1840), followed by Hunyadi László (1844). In these works he incorporated folk dances (csárdás, verbunkos) and adapted the recitatives to the inflections of the Hungarian language. His greatest success was Bánk bán (1861), where he incorporated the címbalo, the Hungarian zither. Of his later works, Brankovics György (1874) stands out.

Wagnerism influenced the work of Ödön Mihalovich, founder of the Budapest Wagner Society and author of Toldi szereime (Toldi's Love, 1893), clearly reminiscent of Wagner.

Later, Béla Bartók combined his own style with traditional Hungarian folk melodies, to which he adapted the asymmetrical patterns of his country's language. He composed a single opera, A kékszakállú herceg vara (The Castle of Barbazul, 1918), based on a play by Maurice Maeterlinck, one-act with prologue.

Zoltán Kodály triumphed in 1926 with Háry János (1926), which was followed by Székely fond (The Spinners, 1932) and the singspiel Czinka Panna (1948). Other members of the Hungarian national school were: Emil Ábrányi (Monna Vanna, 1907; Paolo és Francesca, 1911; Don Quixote, 1917), Imre Kálmán (Die Csárdásfürstin [The Gypsy Princess], 1915; Gräfin Maritza, 1924; Die Zirkusprinzessin [The Circus Princess], 1926) and Mihály Mosonyi (Szép Ilonka [The Beautiful Elena], 1861).

==== Poland ====
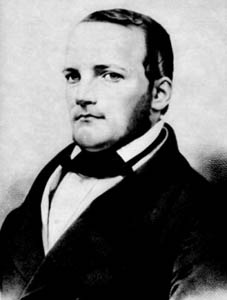
Stanisław Moniuszko

Poland belonged at this time to Russia. The pioneer of modern Polish opera was Stanisław Moniuszko. He composed several operettas until he moved to the big genre with Halka (1847), his greatest success. In this, as in almost all his works, he showed the relations between the Polish nobility and the townspeople as victims of their cruelty. In his works he introduced Polish folk dances, such as the mazurka or the polonaise. After him, for a time the Wagnerian influence was felt, as in the work of Władysław Żeleński (Konrad Wallenrod, 1885) and Ludomir Różycki (Meduza, 1912).

After Poland's independence, which occurred after World War I, Karol Szymanowski was the main architect of a Polish national music. He lived in Zakopane, in the Tatra Mountains, where he studied the syncopated rhythms played there. His first work was Hagith (1913), which denoted German, French and Russian influences. His masterpiece was Król Roger (King Roger, 1924), an evocative, richly nuanced and colorfully orchestrated work, somewhat influenced by Maurice Ravel's Daphnis et Chloé. Other composers were: Ignacy Jan Paderewski (Manru, 1901), Henryk Opieński (Maria, 1905) and Witold Maliszewski (Syrena, 1927).

==== Scandinavia ====
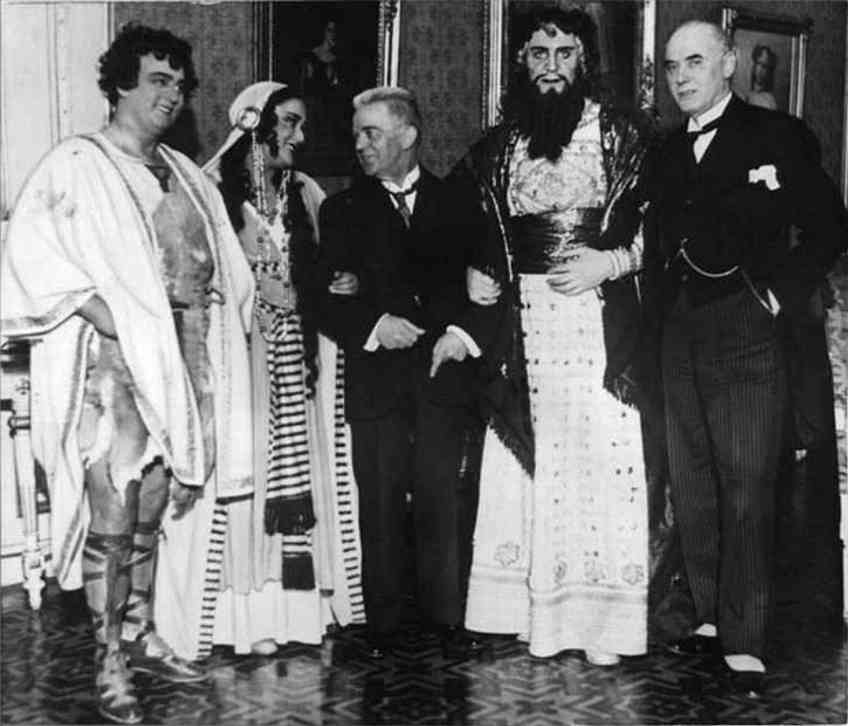
Carl Nielsen in a performance of Saul og David in Stockholm (1931)

In Denmark, there had been some operas in Danish since the late 18th century, but it was with the advent of Romanticism that Danish opera germinated, with composers such as Christoph Ernst Friedrich Weyse (Festen på Kenilworth [Kenilworth Castle], 1836), Johan Peter Emilius Hartmann (Ravnen [The Raven], 1832; Korsarerne [The Privateers], 1835), Niels Gade (Mariotta, 1850), Peter Heise (Drot og Marsk [King and Marshal], 1878), August Enna (Keksen [The Witch], 1892), Carl Nielsen (Saul og David, 1902; Maskarade, 1906) and Paul von Klenau (Gudrun auf Island [Gudrun in Iceland], 1924).

In Sweden, after the presence of German composers in the beginnings of Swedish opera in the late 18th century, the 19th century saw the emergence of the first national authors, such as Kurt Atterberg, author of Härvard Harpolekare (Härvard the Harpist, 1919), Bäckahästen (1925), Fanal (1934), Aladdin (1941) and Stormen (1948); Franz Adolf Berwald (Ein ländliches Verlobungsfest in Schweden, [A Country Wedding in Sweden], 1847); and Ivar Hallström (Den bergtagna [The Bride of the Mountain King], 1874).

Norway belonged to Denmark until 1814, and to Sweden until 1905. The first Norwegian opera was Fjeldeventyret (An Adventure of the Countryside, 1824), by Waldemar Thrane. For his part, Martin Andreas Udbye was the author of the opera Fredkulla (1858) and some operettas. Other exponents were: Ole Olsen (Stig Hvide, 1876; Lajla, 1893; Stallo, 1902), Catharinus Elling (Kosakkerne [The Cossacks], 1897), Johannes Haarklou (Marisagnet [The Legend of Mary], 1910) and Christian Sinding (Der heilige Berg [The Holy Mountain], 1914).

Finland was tied to Sweden until 1808, when it was annexed by Russia, until it became independent after World War I. The first autochthonous works were written by Finland. The first native works were written in Swedish: Kung Carls jakt (The Hunt for King Charles, 1880), by Fredrik Pacius; Jungfrun i tornet (The Girl in the Tower, 1896), by Jean Sibelius. The first works in Finnish appeared after independence, with composers such as Oskar Merikanto (Pohjan neiti [The Girl from Botnia], 1908) and his son Aarre Merikanto (Juha, 1922), as well as Leevi Madetoja (Pohjalaisa [The Botnians of the East], 1924).

==== Belgium and the Netherlands ====
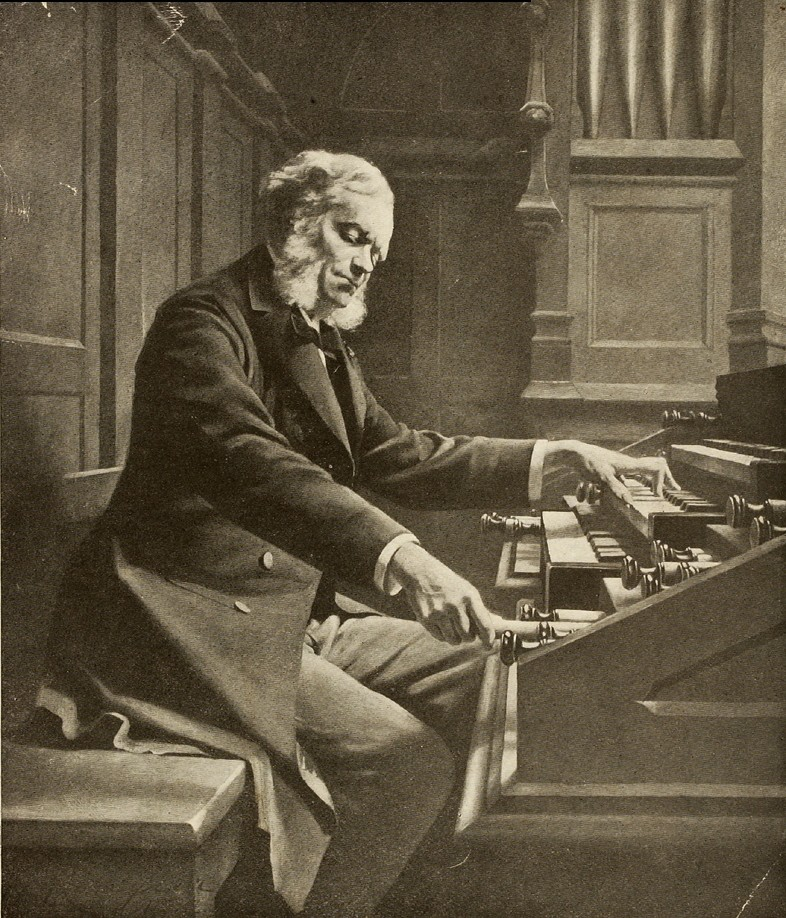
César Franck at the organ

The Netherlands came into contact with opera thanks to French or Italian traveling companies. The first Dutch opera author was Johannes Bernardus van Bree, author of Sapho (1834) and Le Bandit (1840). In general, opera has been of little interest to Dutch composers. Of note is the opera Halewijn by Willem Pijper (1933).

Belgium became independent from the Netherlands in 1830. Precisely, it was the opera La muette de Portici by Daniel Auber, based on the Neapolitan uprising against the Spanish in 1647, that prompted the population to rise and proclaim independence. Early Belgian composers include Albert Grisar (Le Mariage impossible, 1833; L'Eau merveilleuse, 1839), François-Auguste Gevaert (Quentin Durward, 1858) and César Franck (Hulda, 1894). Paul Gilson wrote in Flemish: Prinses Zonneschijn (1903). Jan Blockx reflected the folklore of his country in his plays: Herbergprinses (The Inn Princess, 1896), De Bruid der zeen (The Bride of the Sea, 1901), De kapel (The Chapel, 1903).

==== English-speaking countries ====
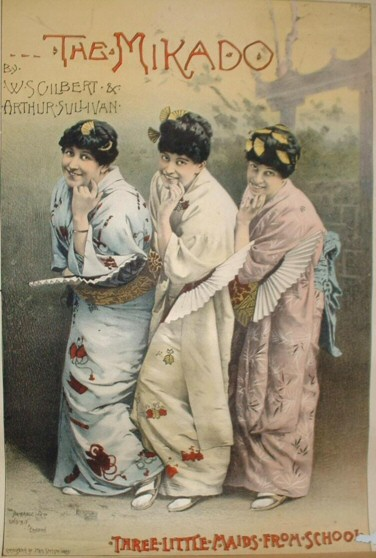
Poster for The Mikado (1885), by Arthur Sullivan

In United Kingdom we cannot speak of an opera of nationalist vindication in the political sense that it had in other countries, but there were attempts to create an English opera alien to Italian, French or German influences. In the field of serious opera this initiative did not take off, despite attempts by authors such as Henry Rowley Bishop, George Alexander Macfarren and the Irish Michael Balfe. Bishop was director of Covent Garden, author of the opera Aladdin (1826). Macfarren was director of the Royal Academy of Music; he composed, among others, An Adventure of Don Quixote (1846) and King Charles II (1849). Balfe, composer, singer and violinist, was first baritone in Palermo, where he premiered his first opera, I rivali di se stessi (1830). In 1835 he returned to England and joined the effort to create an English national opera. He composed twenty-nine operas, including The Siege of La Rochelle (1835), The Maid of Artois (1836) and The Bohemian Girl (1843).

Two other Irish composers developed their work in London, like Balfe: William Vincent Wallace and Charles Villiers Stanford. The former traveled in several countries until he settled in London, where he achieved an early success with the Italianate opera Maritana (1845). After several works of lesser acclaim he produced The Amber Witch (1861), Love's Triumph (1862) and The Desert Flower (1864). Stanford studied in London and Germany. He was the author of several operas in English: Shamus O'Brien (1896), Much Ado About Nothing (1908), The Traveling Companion (1925). Also worth mentioning among British composers are: Granville Bantock (Caedmar, 1893; The Seal Woman, 1924), John Barnett (The Mountain Sylph, 1834; Fair Rosamond, 1837), Julius Benedict (The Lily of Killarney, 1862), Isidore de Lara (Messaline, 1899; Naïl, 1912) and Ethel Smyth (The Boatswain's Mate, 1916).

In the field of comedic opera, however, there was more fortune, in keeping with the long-standing success of ballad opera, which was renewed by a new type of operetta produced by the tandem Arthur Sullivan (composer)—W. S. Gilbert (playwright), which inaugurated a genre called Savoy opera after the theater where they were performed. Their collaboration began with Thespis (1871) and they had a first success with Trial by Jury (1875). Their best works were The Mikado (1885) and The Gondoliers (1889), which already reflected their disagreements, until soon after they parted ways. Sullivan tried his hand at serious opera with Ivanhoe (1891), on Walter Scott's play.

In Ireland, during the 19th century, mostly Italian opera triumphed, as well as some in English. Composers such as Michael Balfe, Vincent Wallace and Charles Stanford settled in London and wrote in English. It was not until the 20th century that operas were composed in Irish, the first of which was by Robert O'Dwyer (Eithne, 1910). Later of note was Geoffrey Molyneux Palmer (Sruth na Maoile [Moyle's Sea], 1923).

In the United States the fondness for European opera grew throughout the 19th century. In 1883 the Metropolitan Opera House opened in New York City, the most prestigious theater in the country, which in 1966 moved to a new building at Lincoln Center. In the 19th century Italian opera predominated, despite attempts at English-language operas such as those by George Frederick Bristow (Rip van Winkle, 1855) and Silas Gamaliel Pratt (Zenobia, Queen of Palmyra, 1882). In the 20th century, influences of popular music, especially jazz were gradually introduced. Frederick Converse was the author of The Pipe of Desire (1906), the first American opera presented at the Metropolitan. Scott Joplin, an African-American musician exponent of ragtime rhythms, was the author of the opera Treemonisha (1911). The following year, Horatio Parker premiered Mona, which passed without much significance.

Virgil Thomson was the author of what is considered the first great American opera, Four Saints in Three Acts (1928), with libretto by Gertrude Stein. The two collaborated again in The Mother of Us All (1947), based on the life of the feminist Susan B. Anthony. His third and final opera was Lord Byron (1972). Henry Kimball Hadley studied in Boston and Vienna, and was conductor of the Seattle Symphony. His operas include Safie (1909), Azora (1917) and Cleopatra's Night (1919). In 1933 he premiered A Night in Old Paris on radio.

George Gershwin combined classical music with elements of American popular music, especially jazz and blues. In 1922 he premiered the jazz-opera Blue Monday, which was not very successful. His next project was Porgy and Bess (1935), a folk-opera incorporating jazz and blues rhythms, with a libretto by his brother, Ira Gershwin, and DuBose Heyward. It was not very well received initially, although over time it grew in prestige until it was considered one of the best American operas.

==== Baltic countries ====
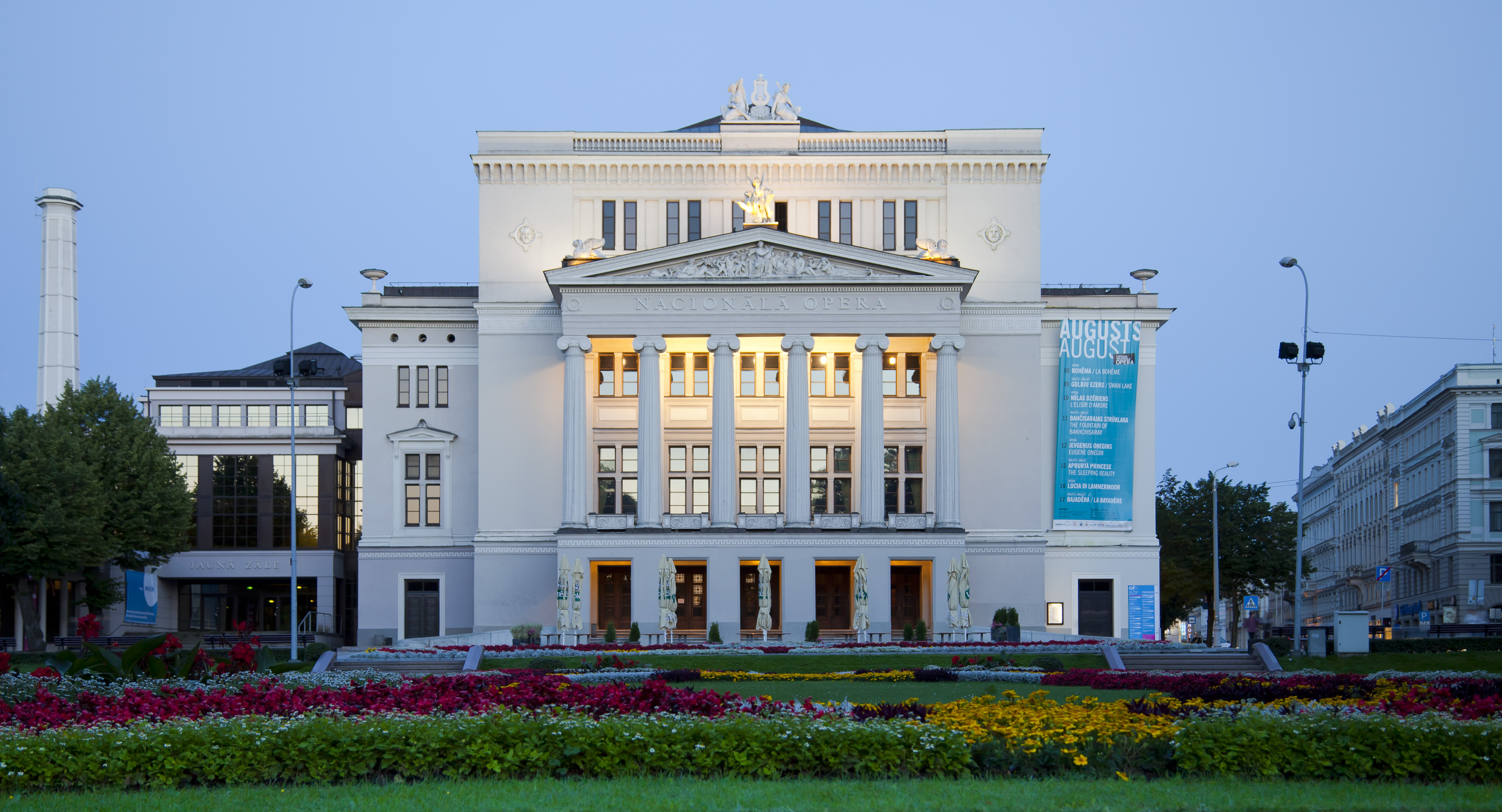
Latvian National Opera, Riga

The current Baltic republics had a period of independence between 1918 and 1940, to be then absorbed by the Soviet Union, until they became independent again in 1991. In Estonia, the first opera in the local language was Sabina (1906), by Artur Lemba. Notable in the interwar period was Evald Aav, author of Vikerlased (The Vikings, 1928).

Latvia was in the Germanic cultural sphere, so this influence predominated in the origin of its operatic tradition. In 1919 the Latvian National Opera (Latvijas Nacionālā Opera) opened in Riga, where the Latvian opera Banjuta by Alfrēds Kalniņš premiered in 1920. His son Jānis Kalniņš was the author of Hamlet (1936). Other exponents of Latvian opera were the brothers Jānis Mediņš (Uguns un nakts [Fire and Night], 1921) and Jāzeps Mediņš (Vaidelote [The Vestal], 1927).

Lithuania, closer to Poland, received like Poland the initial influence of Italian opera. In 1922 the Lithuanian National Theater (Lietuvos Tautas Teatras) was founded in Vilnius. The first Lithuanian opera was Birutė (1906) by Mikas Petrauskas. Subsequent highlights included Antanas Račiūnas' (Trys talismanai [Three Talismans], 1936) and Jurgis Karnavičius (Gražina, 1932).

==== Balkan countries ====
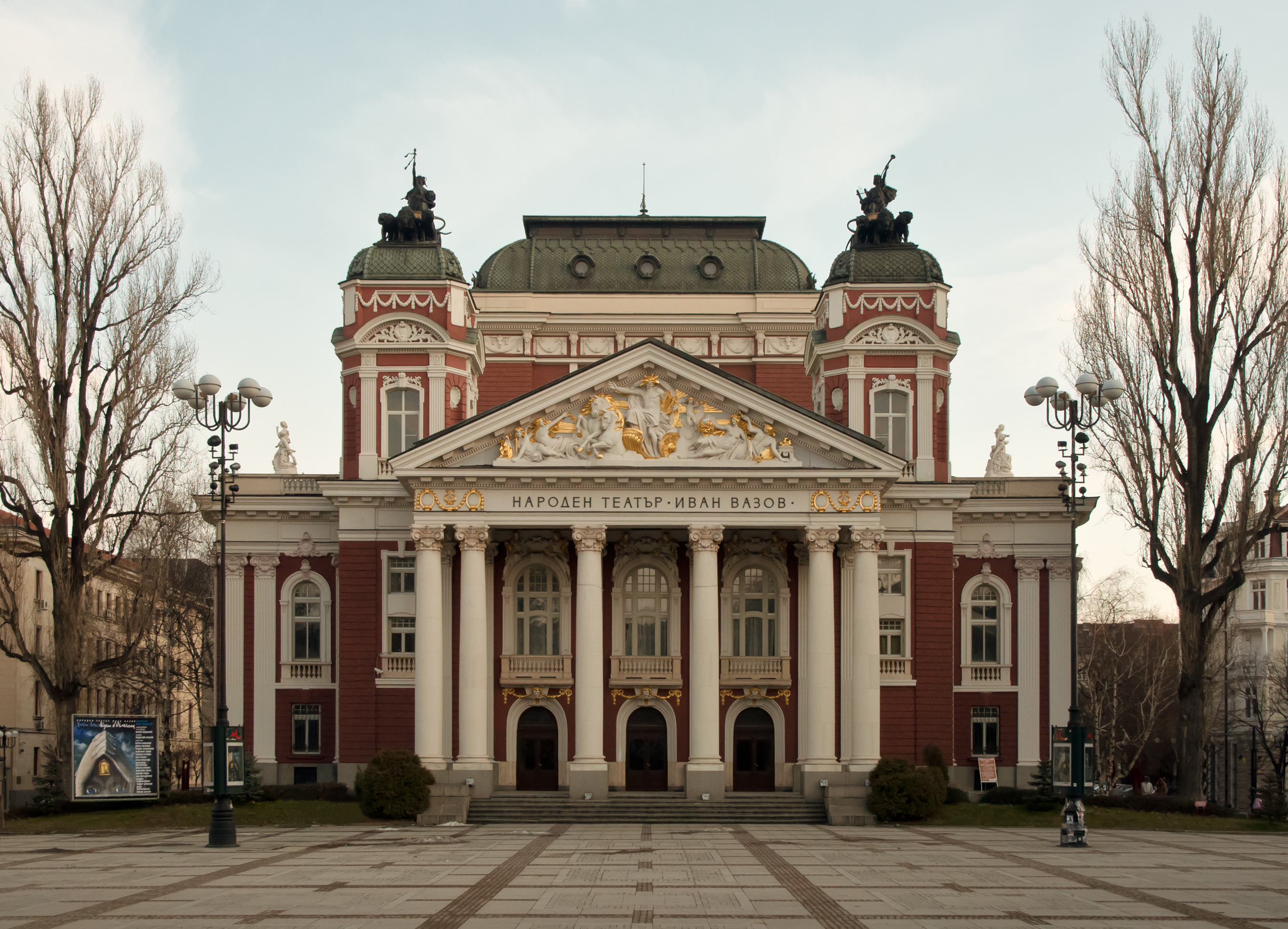
Bulgarian National Theater, Sofia

Bulgaria became independent from the Ottoman Empire in 1885. In 1908 the Naroden Teatar (National Theater) in Sofia was founded. The first opera in Bulgarian was Shiromakhinya (The Poor Woman, 1910), by Emanuil Manolov. The main architect of the Bulgarian national opera was Georgi Atanasov, a pupil of Pietro Mascagni in Italy. He was the author of Borislav (1911), Gergana (1917), Zapustyalata vodenitsa (The Abandoned Mill, 1923) and Tsveta (The Flower, 1923). Other exponents were Ivan Ivanov, author of Kamen i Tsena (The Stone Pyramid, 1911); Dimitar Hadjigeorgiev (Takhin Begovitsa, 1911); and Pancho Vladigerov (Tsar Kalojan, 1936).

Romania gained independence from the Ottoman Empire in 1878, after which it joined European cultural life. The closeness of Romanian – a language of Latin origin – to Italian favored the spread of Italian opera. Among the pioneers was Ciprian Porumbescu, author of the operetta Crai nou (New Moon, 1880). Later Nicolae Bretan (Luceafărul, 1921) and, mainly, George Enescu, trained in France, where he was a pupil of Gabriel Fauré and Jules Massenet. In 1917 he composed his opera Œdipe (Oedipus), whose manuscript he lost during a trip, so he had to rewrite it and finally premiered it at the Paris Opera in 1936. It was a grandiloquent work, requiring three groups of timpani and machinery to simulate wind.

Croatia was an integral part of the Austro-Hungarian Empire, until the Kingdom of Serbs, Croats and Slovenes (since 1929, Yugoslavia) was formed in 1918. It became independent in 1991. In 1895, the National Theatre in Zagreb opened. The first composer to write in his language was Vatroslav Lisinski: Ljubav i zloba (Love and malice, 1846). Later, Krešimir Baranović was the author of comic operas, such as Nevjesta od Cetingrada (The Bride of Cetingrada, 1942). Other authors were: Blagoje Bersa (Der Eisenhammer [The Iron Hammer], 1911; Der Schuster von Delft [The Shoemaker of Delft], 1914), Jakov Gotovac (Ero s onoga svijeta [Ero from the Otherworld], 1935) and Ivan Zajc (Nikola Šubić Zrinjski, 1876).

Slovenia had the same historical development as Croatia. In 1892, the Ljubljana Opera was founded. The first opera in Slovenian is due to Jakob Suppan (Bellin, 1782), now lost. Throughout the 19th century some Slovene composers occasionally devoted themselves to opera, with poor results. In the transition to the 20th century, Risto Savin stood out (Lepa Vida [Beautiful Life], 1907).

In Serbia, under Ottoman rule, opera was not introduced until the last quarter of the 19th century. It became independent in 1882, to become part after World War I of the Kingdom of Serbs, Croats and Slovenes, later Yugoslavia. In 1894 the National Theater (Pozorište Narodno) of Belgrade was founded. The pioneer of Serbian opera was Petar Konjović (Koštana, 1931).

The San Giacomo theater on Corfu, began hosting a regular opera season as early as 1771 and in 1791, the Ionian-Greek composer Stefano Pogiago premiered his opera Gli amanti confusi there.

Greece became independent from the Ottoman Empire in 1830. Soon several Italian companies were established and a taste for opera began. In the 19th century, several Greek cities established theatres that staged both drama and opera. In 1864, the Apollon Theatre opened on the island of Syros, followed in 1872 by Patras inaugurating its own Apollon Theatre. Later, in 1888 the Greek Opera was founded in Athens, since 1939 Royal Opera and, nowadays, National Opera. Finally, in 1895, the city of Piraeus introduced the Piraeus Municipal Theatre. The most significant privately-run Greek opera company was the Hellenic Melodrama, operated from 1888 until 1943. In 1858, the Greek composer Pavlos Carrer wrote his opera Marco Bozzari, originally set to an Italian libretto and translated into Greek shortly thereafter. He later followed it with the operas Kyra Frosini (premiered 1868) and Despo (premiered 1882). Spyridon Xyndas, composed some operas in Italian and also the first opera to be set originally to a Greek libretto called O ypopfisios vouleftis [The Parliamentary Candidate] (premiered 1888 in Athens). Subsequent highlights included Manolis Kalomiris (O Protomastoras [The Master Builder], 1916), Dionysios Lavrangas (Ta dyo adelfia, [The Two Brothers], 1900; Dido, 1909) and Theophrastos Sakellaridis (O Vaftistikos [The Godson], 1918). Greek composers frequently developed successful careers beyond the limited Greek opera scene. For example, Spyridon Samaras operas, such as Flora Mirabilis (1866) and La Martire (1894) were well received in Italy and Napoleon Lambelet who spent several years in London's West End.

==== Turkey and Caucasus countries ====
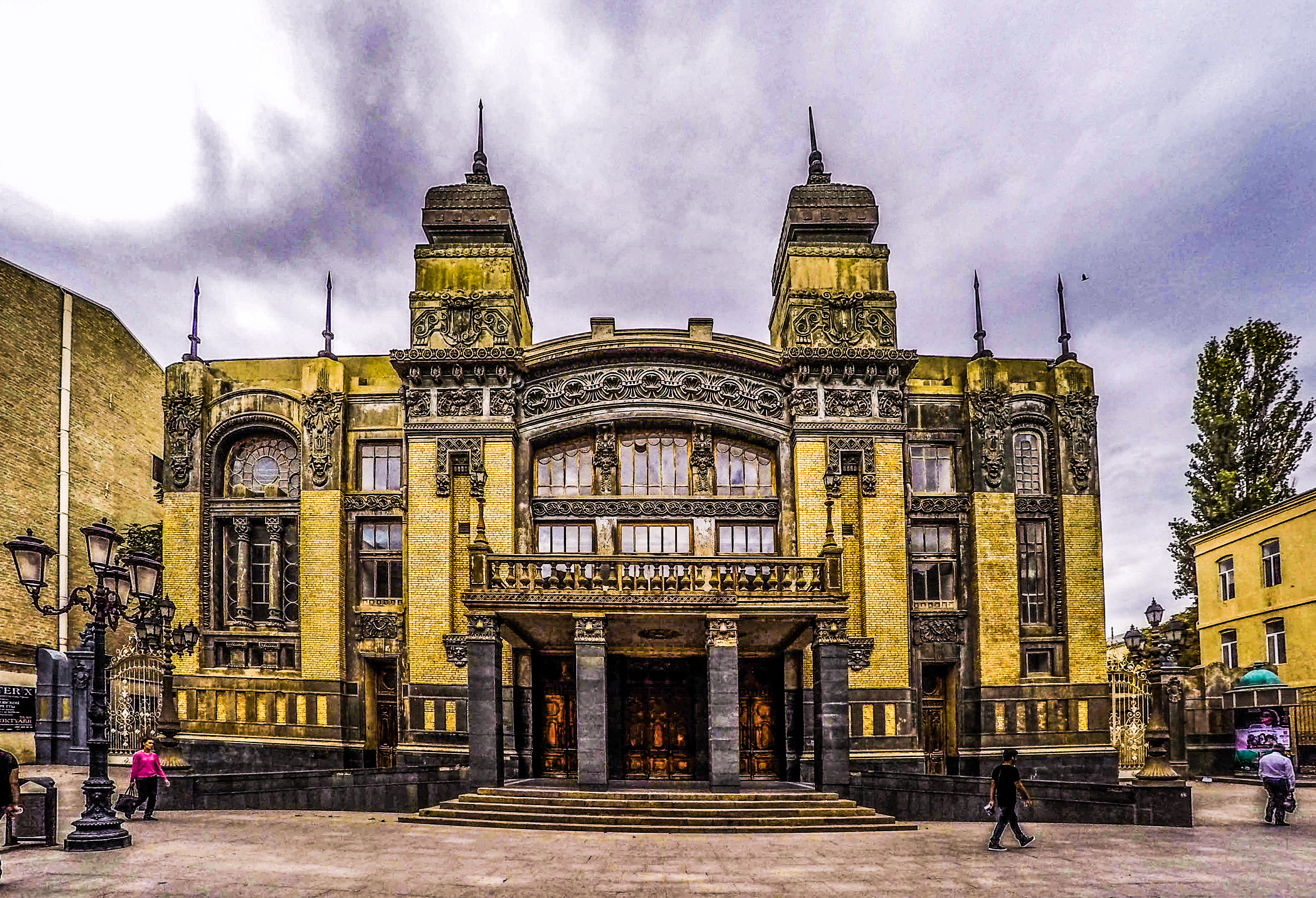
Azerbaijan State Academic Opera and Ballet Theatre, Baku

In the Ottoman Empire (present-day Turkey) there was presence of Italian companies since the end of the 18th century. The first Turkish opera premiered at the Vienna Volksoper in 1918: Kenan çobanları, by Vedî Sabra. With the process of Europeanization initiated by Kemal Atatürk in the 1920s, opera became more widespread in the country: in 1929, Köyde bir facia, by Cemal Reşit Rey was premiered; in 1934, Ahmet Adnan Saygun received an official commission for an opera for the visit of shah of Persia, for which he composed Özsoy.

In Armenia, whose territory was divided between Turkey and Russia, opera enjoyed great popularity. The first Armenian opera was due to Tigran Chukhachean (Arshak Erkrod, 1868). Subsequently, Armen Tigranian (Anusha, 1912) and Alexander Spendiaryan (Almast, 1928) stood out.

In Georgia, Italian opera was introduced in the mid-19th century. The first Georgian composer of some renown was Meliton Balanchivadze, author of Daredžan Tsviery (Daredžan the Sly, 1898). Later, Zakharia Paliashvili (Abesalom da Eteri, 1919) and Iona Tuskiya, author of Rodina (Homeland, 1939) stood out.

In Azerbaijan there was a traditional genre of sung music, the mugam. Opera was introduced in the late 19th century: the first Azerbaijani opera Leyli and Medzhnun (1908), by Uzeyir Hajibeyov, is considered to be the first Azerbaijani opera. In 1910 the Tagiyev's Theater (now Azerbaijan State Academic Opera and Ballet Theater) in Baku opened, which promoted local opera, led by Müslüm Maqomayev (Shah Ismail, 1919).

==== Portugal ====
In Portugal, Italian opera predominated during the 19th century, with few local productions. In 1793, the Teatro São Carlos in Lisbon was inaugurated. The first prominent composer was José Augusto Ferreira Veiga (L'elisir di giovinezza, 1876; Dina la derelitta, 1885). In a tardo romanticismo he emphasized Alfredo Keil (Dona Branca, 1883; Irene, 1893; Serrana, 1899).

==== Spain ====
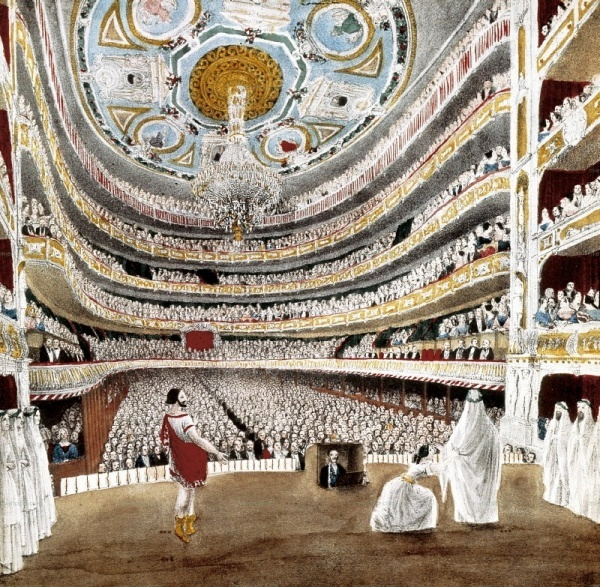
Performance of Norma by Vincenzo Bellini at the Gran Teatre del Liceu in Barcelona (1847)

In Spain it is not possible to speak of nationalism as such: a Spanish nationality was not claimed against a foreign dominator, no patriotic identities or lost cultural essences were asserted, no formulas from the past were sought, neither popular legends nor traditional folklore were resorted to. On the other hand, the different regional modalities of popular music were used (Andalusian, Asturian, Aragonese, Catalan, Basque, Galician), together with a certain orientalist influence fashionable in Europe and considered here as more genuine because of the Andalusian past of the Iberian Peninsula. During practically the first half of the century the influence of Italian opera, especially Rossinian opera, continued. Some composers followed that line, such as Baltasar Saldoni and Hilarión Eslava. In 1832 the Teatro Principal in Valencia was inaugurated, in 1847 the Gran Teatro del Liceo in Barcelona and, in 1850, the Teatro Real in Madrid.

The pioneer of opera in Spain was Felipe Pedrell, one of the fathers—with Francisco Asenjo Barbieri—of modern Spanish musicology. In his first works, some of them in Italian, he showed the influence of Italian opera, as in L'ultimo abenzerraggio (The last abenzerrage, 1874), Quasimodo (1875) and Cleopatra (1878). Later he denoted Wagnerian influence: I Pirinei (The Pyrenees, 1902), La Celestina (1904).

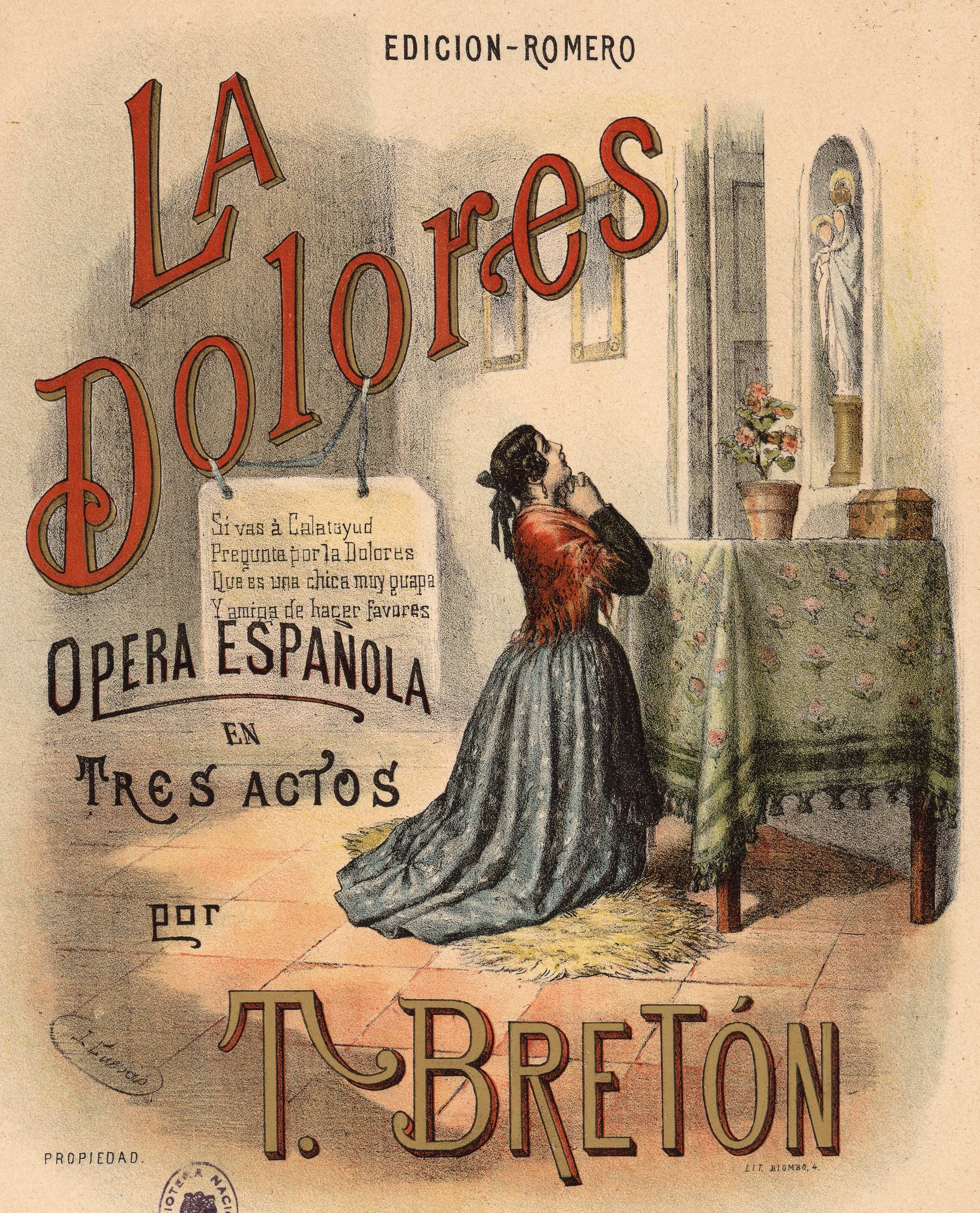
Poster for La Dolores (1895), by Tomás Bretón

Other pioneers were Ruperto Chapí and Tomás Bretón. Chapí studied in Paris thanks to a scholarship obtained after composing the short opera Las naves de Cortés (1874). In 1876 he premiered La hija de Jefté at the Teatro Real. From then on he devoted himself mainly to zarzuela, but still composed several operas, such as Roger de Flor (1878), Circe (1902) and Margarita la tornera (1909). Bretón studied in Italy and Vienna. He began with the short opera Guzmán el Bueno (1878), which was followed by Los amantes de Teruel (1889), Garín (1892), La Dolores (1895) and Raquel (1900). In some of his works he introduced Spanish folk music, such as a sardana in Garín and a jota in La Dolores.

Interlude of Goyescas (1916), by Enrique Granados

Among the great composers of the period are Isaac Albéniz, Enrique Granados and Manuel de Falla. Albéniz began in zarzuela, until he signed a contract with an English banker to write operas, the fruit of which were The Magic Opal (1893), Henry Clifford (1895), Pepita Jiménez (1896) and Merlin (1897–1902), the latter on a cycle based on King Arthur of which he only made this first title. Granados achieved fame with his piano pieces. In 1898 he premiered his opera María del Carmen, close to zarzuela. Later, he adapted several compositions for piano in his opera Goyescas (1916), which he premiered at the Metropolitan in New York. Falla, one of the best modern Spanish composers, combined musical nationalism—with some influence of the Norwegian Edvard Grieg—with impressionism, which he met during a stay in France. Although he was not very prolific in opera, he left two notable works: La vida breve (1913) and El retablo de Maese Pedro (1923). He began an adaptation of La Atlántida by Jacinto Verdaguer, which was completed by Ernesto Halffter and premiered in 1962 as Atlántida.

Other exponents were: Enric Morera, who began in opera with La fada (1897), in Wagnerian style. In 1906 he premiered two works at the Liceo de Barcelona, Bruniselda and Emporium, followed by Titaina (1912) and Tassarba (1916). Amadeo Vives was a pupil of Pedrell and, together with Lluís Millet, founder of the Orfeó Català. In 1897 he premiered his first opera, Artús, followed by Euda d'Uriac (1900), Colomba (1910), Maruxa (1914) and Balada de Carnaval (1919). Jesús Guridi was a professor of organ at the Madrid Conservatory. He composed two operas: Mirentxu (1910, in Basque) and Amaya (1920). Jaume Pahissa, a pupil of Enric Morera, wrote several operas in Catalan, such as Gal-la Placídia (1913), La morisca (1919), Marianela (1923) and La princesa Margarida (1928). Joaquín Turina met Falla and Albéniz in Paris, through whose influence he turned to Spanish national music, with a certain impressionist influence. His most relevant opera is Jardín de Oriente (1923).

Also worth mentioning are: Conrado del Campo (Fantochines, 1923; Lola, la piconera, 1950), Óscar Esplá (La bella durmiente, 1909), Joan Lamote de Grignon (Hesperia, 1907), Juan Manén (Giovanna di Napoli, 1903; Acté, 1904), Manuel Penella Moreno (El gato montés, 1917; Don Gil de Alcalá, 1932), Emilio Serrano (Doña Juana la Loca, 1890; Irene de Otranto, 1891) and Eduard Toldrà (El giravolt de maig, 1928).

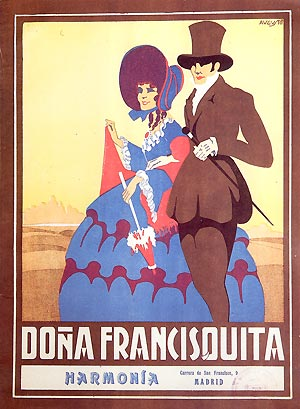
Cover of Doña Francisquita (1923), by Amadeo Vives

In this century the zarzuela resurfaced again, recovered by the new romantic taste and the nationalist revival. In 1856, a group of composers formed by Francisco Asenjo Barbieri, Joaquín Gaztambide, José Inzenga, Rafael Hernando and Cristóbal Oudrid created the Sociedad Artística to promote the genre and promoted the creation of the Teatro de la Zarzuela in Madrid (1856). It was then differentiated into "género grande" and "género chico", the former divided into three acts and the latter composed of only one. It included sung and spoken parts, as well as popular dances, with a generally costumbrista theme—especially casticista—and comic tendency. It developed especially in the third quarter of the century, the era of the "género grande", three-act plays influenced by the French buf parisien. Among its exponents are: Cristóbal Oudrid (Buenas noches, señor don Simón, 1852; El postillón de La Rioja, 1856), Emilio Arrieta (El grumete, 1853; Marina, 1855; La suegra del Diablo, 1867; Las fuentes del Prado, 1870), Joaquín Gaztambide (Catalina, 1854; Los magiares, 1857; El juramento, 1858), Francisco Asenjo Barbieri (Los diamantes de la corona, 1854; Pan y toros, 1864; El barberillo de Lavapiés, 1874; El diablo cojuelo, 1878) and Ruperto Chapí (La tempestad, 1883; La bruja, 1887; El rey que rabió, 1891).

Towards the end of the century the "género chico" was more fashionable, one-act plays, with more recitative, with a certain influence of Viennese operetta. Of note are: Tomás Bretón (La verbena de la Paloma, 1884), Federico Chueca (La Gran Vía, 1886; El año pasado por agua, 1889; Agua, azucarillos y aguardiente, 1897), Ruperto Chapí (La Revoltosa, 1897; El puñao de rosas, 1902), Manuel Fernández Caballero (El dúo de La africana, 1893; Gigantes y cabezudos, 1898), Gerónimo Giménez (El baile de Luis Alonso, 1896; La boda de Luis Alonso, 1897; La tempranica, 1900), Amadeo Vives (La balada de la luz, 1900; Bohemios, 1903; Doña Francisquita, 1923), José Serrano Simeón (La Reina mora, 1903; Moros y cristianos, 1905; La canción del olvido, 1916; Los claveles, 1929; La dolorosa, 1930), Vicente Lleó Balbastre (La corte de Faraón, 1910), Pablo Luna (Molinos de viento, 1910; Los cadetes de la reina, 1913; El asombro de Damasco, 1916; El niño judío, 1918), José María Usandizaga (The Swallows 1914), Francisco Alonso (La linda tapada, 1924; Las Leandras, 1931), Jacinto Guerrero (Los gavilanes, 1923; El huésped del sevillano, 1926; La rosa del azafrán, 1930), José Padilla Sánchez (La bien amada, 1924), the tandem Juan Vert-Reveriano Soutullo (La leyenda del beso, 1924; La del Soto del Parral, 1927; El último romántico, 1928), Jesús Guridi (El caserío, 1926; La meiga, 1928; Peñamariana, 1944), Federico Moreno Torroba (Luisa Fernanda, 1932) and Pablo Sorozábal (La del manojo de rosas, 1934; La tabernera del puerto, 1936; La eterna canción, 1945; Los burladores, 1948; La ópera del mogollón, 1954). It is also worth mentioning Cançó d'amor i de guerra (1926), by Rafael Martínez Valls, zarzuela written in Catalan.

After the Spanish Civil War, zarzuela was in decline, until its virtual disappearance in the 1960s. Today, the classics of the genre are still performed, but there is no new production.

==== Latin America ====
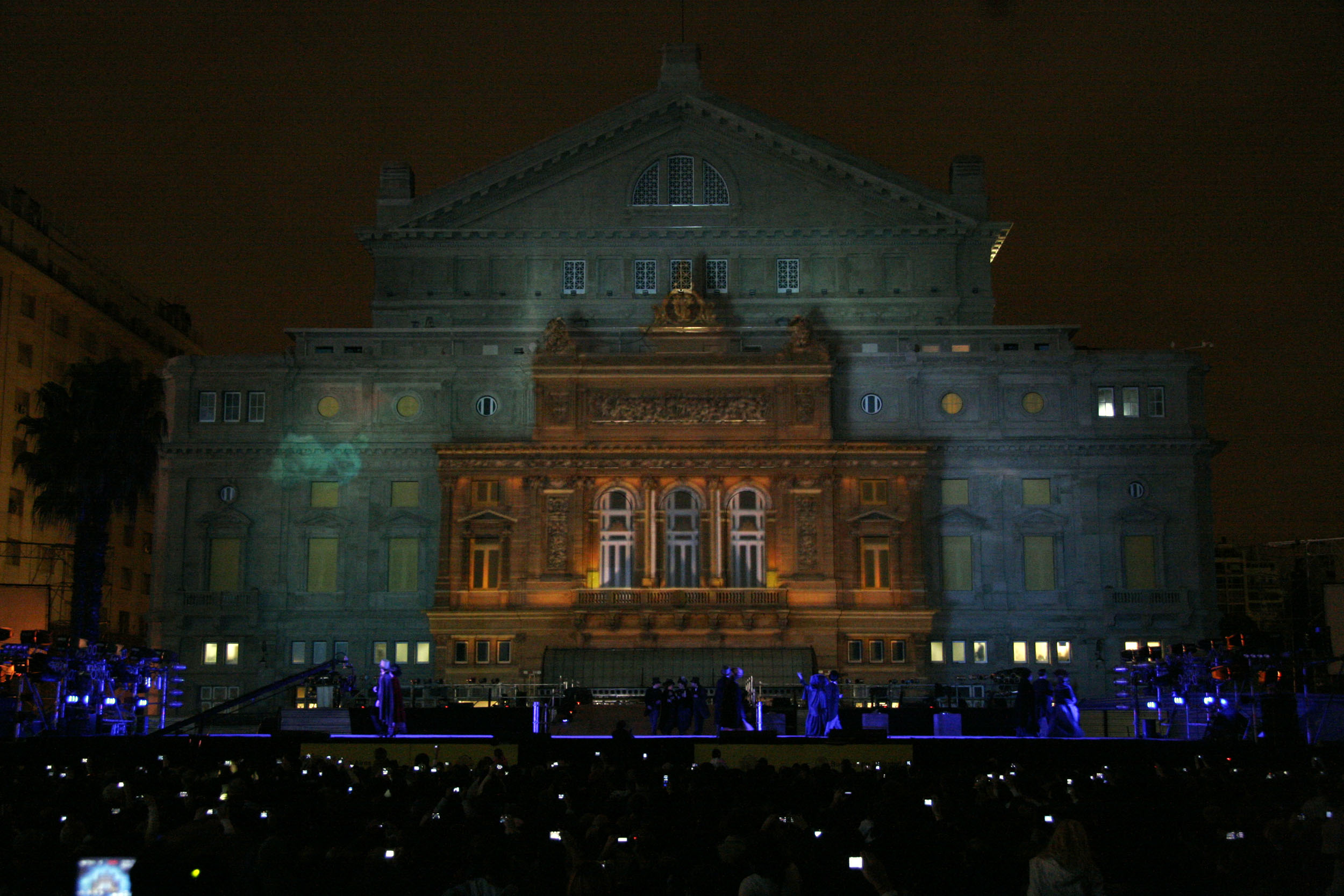
Teatro Colón, Buenos Aires

Latin American opera underwent a gradual evolution over time: during the colonial period, Italian or Spanish operas were performed; after the independence of the colonies, native works began to be produced, but which followed the rules of Italian opera; over time, local elements were added, generally with a folkloric or popular air; finally, works of a universal character began to be produced.

In Argentina, opera was carried by Italian companies, after the country's independence. In 1857, the Teatro Colón in Buenos Aires was opened. One of the first local composers was Arturo Berutti, author of Pampa (1897) and Yupanqui (1899). In 1908, Héctor Panizza had a great success with Aurora. In 1916, Felipe Boero composed Tucumán to commemorate the centenary of independence; another work of his was El Matrero (1929), considered the Argentine national opera. Other authors were: Pascual De Rogatis (Huémac, 1916), Constantino Vicente Gaito (Petronio, 1919; Ollantay, 1926), Floro Ugarte (Saika, 1920) and Athos Palma (La novia del hereje, 1935).

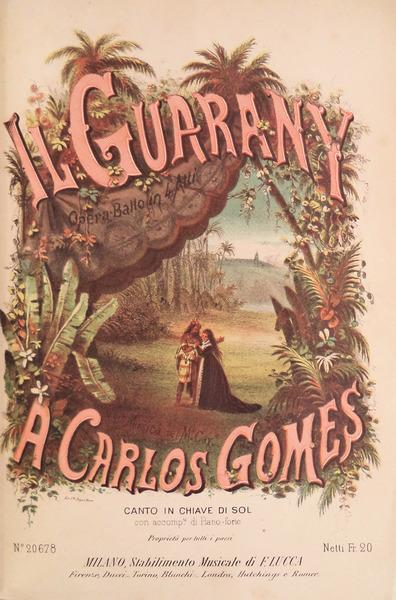
Poster of Il Guarany (1870), by Antônio Carlos Gomes

In Brazil, when the Portuguese court moved to the new continent in 1808, due to the Napoleonic invasion, it brought with it a taste for Italian opera. Gradually, local composers emerged, among them Carlos Gomes, the first Latin American composer to triumph in Europe (Joana de Flandres, 1863; Il Guarany, 1870; Salvator Rosa, 1874; Maria Tudor, 1878; Lo Schiavo, 1889), who, however, wrote in Italian, in a late-Verdian style. The first attempts in Portuguese were by composers such as Francisco Braga (O contractador de diamantes, 1901) and Oscar Lorenzo Fernández (Malazarte, 1921).

In Colombia, the first production was Ester (1874), by José María Ponce de León. In Chile, Telésfora (1841), by Aquinas Ried.

Cuba began in the operatic tradition while a Spanish colony. Throughout the 19th century, Italian opera triumphed above all. In 1875, Laureano Fuentes Matons composed the first Cuban opera, La hija de Jefté. Later, Ignacio Cervantes (Los Saltimbanquis, 1899) and Eduardo Sánchez de Fuentes (El náufrago, 1901). There were also composers of zarzuelas, such as Ernesto Lecuona (María la O, 1930; El cafetal, 1930) and Eliseo Grenet (Niña Rita, 1927; La virgen morena, 1928).

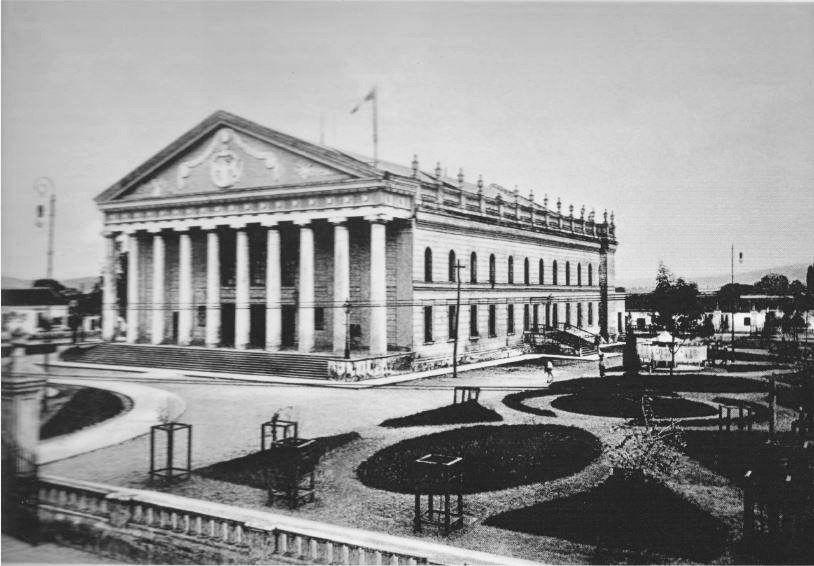
Teatro Carrera, Guatemala.

In Guatemala, Italian opera was introduced in the early 19th century. In 1859 the Teatro Carrera, later called Nacional and, since 1886, Colón, was inaugurated. The first local opera was La mora generosa (1850), by José Escolástico Andrino. Already in the 20th century, Jesús Castillo (Quiché Vinak, 1924) stood out.

Mexico had an operatic tradition from its colonial past: a Mexican opera, La Parténope (1711), by Manuel de Sumaya, was produced as early as the 18th century. The opera tradition was centered in Mexico City (Palacio de Bellas Artes, inaugurated in 1934) and cities such as Guanajuato and Guadalajara. In the early 19th century Italian opera predominated, until the second half saw the first local productions with authors such as Melesio Morales (Romeo and Juliet, 1863; Ildegonda, 1866; Gino Corsini, 1877), Aniceto Ortega (Guatemotzin, 1871), Felipe Villanueva (Keofar, 1892), Ricardo Castro (Atzimba, 1900) and Gustavo Campa (El rey poeta, 1901).

In Nicaragua, Luis Abraham Delgadillo was outstanding: Final de Norma (1930), Mabaltayán (1942).

In Peru, European cultural life was closely followed in the 19th century. The first opera in the country was Atahualpa (1875), by the Italian Carlo Enrico Pasta. Subsequently, José María Valle Riestra (Ollanta, 1900) and Ernesto López Mindreau (Nueva Castilla, 1926) stood out.

In Uruguay, the Teatro Solís in Montevideo, the country's main operatic center, was opened in 1856. Among its composers were: Tomás Giribaldi (La Parisina, 1878), Alfonso Broqua (Tabaré, 1888), León Ribeiro (Colón, 1892; Liropeya, 1912), Manuel M. Ponce (El patio florido, 1913) and Carlos Pedrell (Ardid de amor, 1917; La guitarra, 1924).

In Venezuela, it is worth mentioning: José Ángel Montero (Virginia, 1873) and Reynaldo Hahn (Le Marchand de Venise, 1935).

=== Verismo ===
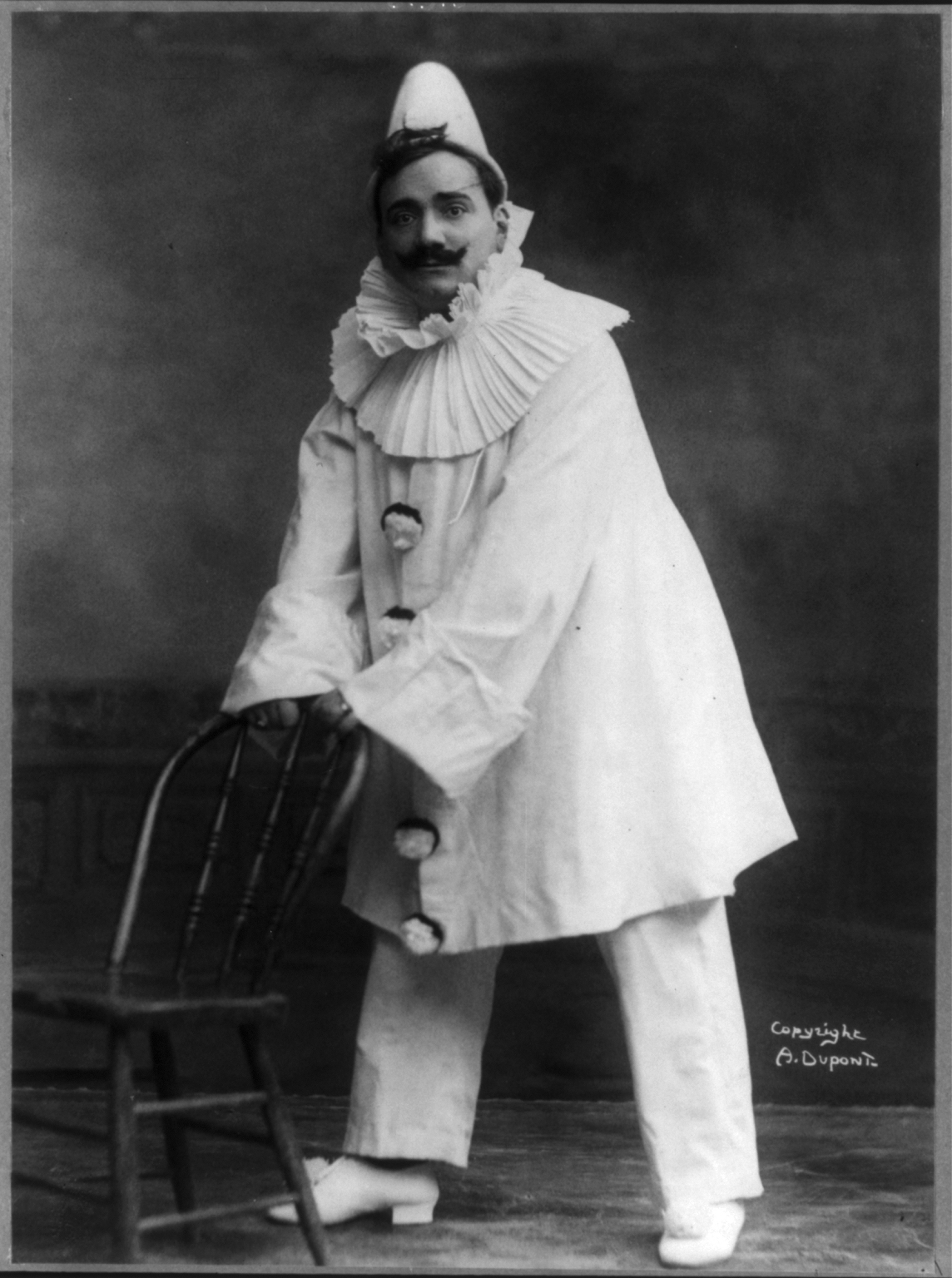
Enrico Caruso as Canio, in the opera Pagliacci by Ruggero Leoncavallo

Italian verismo—also known as Giovane Scuola (Young School)—sought to reflect reality, with more popular plots, in rural and proletarians environments, where the protagonists were ordinary characters. This movement grew out of the naturalista literature initiated in France by Émile Zola, which had as exponents in Italy Giovanni Verga and Luigi Capuana. Verist composers denoted the influence of Verdi and Wagner, although they broke with the Romantic tradition. The music was continuous, transcomposed in the Wagnerian style, (Note: Especially from Giordano and Puccini, while, in the early verismo, Mascagni and Leoncavallo still showed compact numbers in their works Menéndez Torrellas (2013, p. 363).) without cabaletta and with arias without a fixed standard. They eliminated overtures, but added intermezzi, of a showy orchestration of dramatic tone. The voice was taken to the limit of its expressive possibilities. In verismo, leading roles were even given to villains and reprehensible characters, such as murderers, pimps, prostitutes and other characters of low extraction. However, over time, the didactic message that verismo sought to convey drifted into sensationalist plots, which together with colorful and gimmicky orchestration reflected the new tastes of the public.

Enrico Caruso performing No Pagliaccio non-son, from the opera Pagliacci by Ruggero Leoncavallo

The beginning of the success of verismo was with two operas: Cavalleria rusticana by Pietro Mascagni and Pagliacci by Ruggero Leoncavallo. Mascagni worked as a conductor with various companies throughout Italy until 1888, when he entered a musical competition organized by the publisher Edoardo Sanzogno with the one-act opera Cavalleria rusticana (premiered in 1890), with which he won the competition and reaped an enormous success. Based on a play by Giovanni Verga, it was notable for its ordinary characters driven by violent passions. He did not repeat such success with his following plays: L'amico Fritz (1891), I Rantzau (1893) and Guglielmo Ratcliff (1895). Leoncavallo composed his first opera at the age of nineteen (Chatterton, 1876). Following a commission from the publisher Giulio Ricordi, he undertook a trilogy in the Wagnerian style, which he never completed. After a time in which he devoted himself mainly to writing, the success of Cavalleria rusticana encouraged him again and he composed his greatest success, Pagliacci (1892), a tragic story about four itinerant actors, with libretto written by himself. His next works were not so successful: I Medici (1893), La bohème (1897) and Zazà (1900).

Intermezzo, from Cavalleria rusticana, opera by Pietro Mascagni (1890)

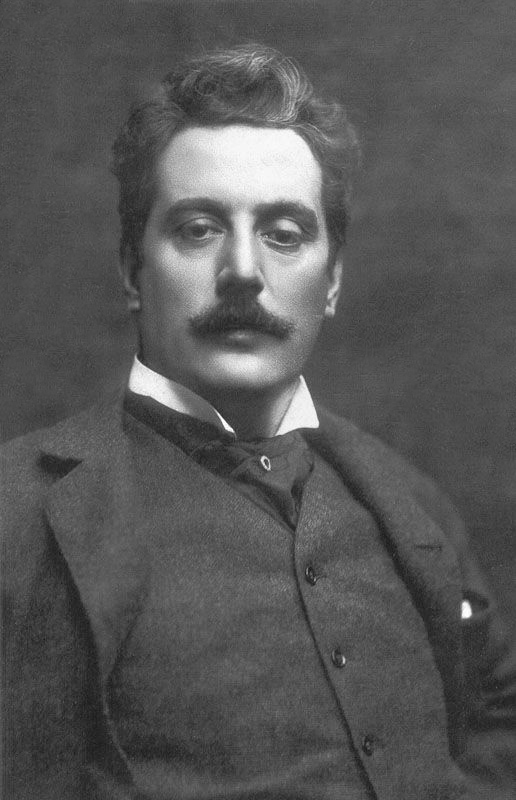
Giacomo Puccini

The most outstanding composer of this trend was Giacomo Puccini. A pupil of Ponchielli, he had a great instinct for suggestive melodies and passionate plots, as well as for combining music and drama in perfect harmony, always with the voice as the central axis of his composition. An admirer of Wagner, he used the leitmotiv in several of his works. He had a first success with Le Villi (The Willis, 1884), but for various reasons his next operatic work, Edgar (1889), which was not well received, was delayed. He did achieve great success with Manon Lescaut (1893), which brought him fame and fortune. In collaboration with librettists Giuseppe Giacosa and Luigi Illica he created his three most relevant operas: La Bohème (1896), Tosca (1900) and Madama Butterfly (1904). The former, about Parisian bohemian life, blended tragedy, passion and humor, along with seductive music that greatly pleased audiences. Tosca presented an equally tragic plot enhanced by musical dissonances and twisted harmonies, with one of the most complex female roles ever sketched. Her aria E lucevan le stelle is one of the opera's most famous, also known as the Farewell to Life. Madama Butterfly is set in Japan, in keeping with the exotic taste of the time. Although it was not well received at its premiere, over time its tonal coloring and harmonic language have been appreciated. It includes the famous aria Un bel dì, vedremo.

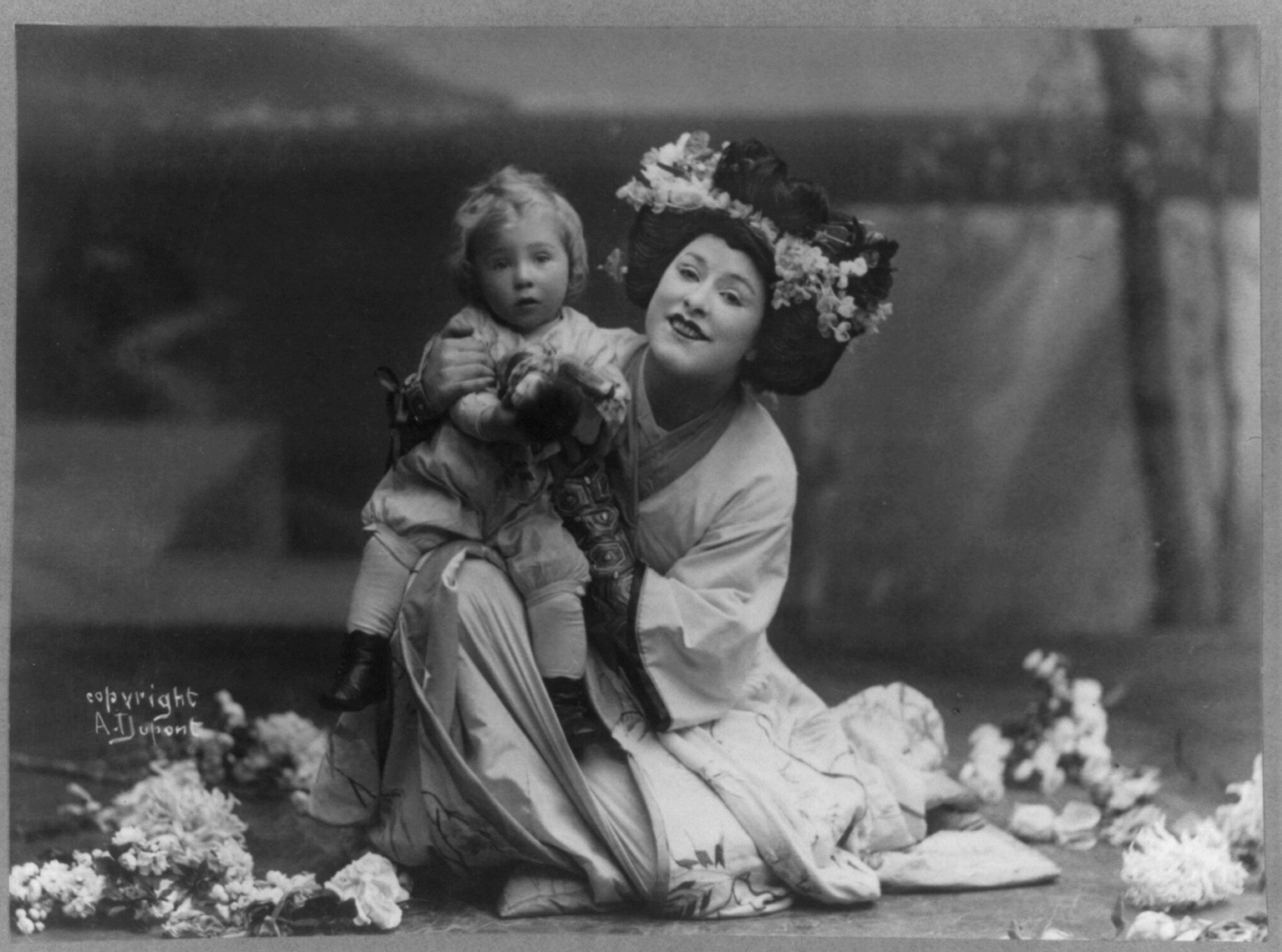
Geraldine Farrar as Madama Butterfly

In 1910 he premiered in New York La fanciulla del West (The Girl from the West). After La rondine (La golondrina, 1917), his next project was Il trittico (The Triptych), a set of three operas to be performed in a single session: Il tabarro (The tabard), Suor Angelica and Gianni Schicchi (1918). His last opera was Turandot, on which he worked between 1920 and the year of his death (1924), and which was completed by Franco Alfano and premiered in 1926. In this work he synthesized his musical style: conjunction of drama and music, real characters of great emotional force and music of great symphonic intensity. It includes the famous aria Nessun dorma.

Other prominent composers of verismo were Umberto Giordano and Francesco Cilea. Giordano began in Sanzogno's competition with the one-act opera Marina (1889). It was followed by Mala vita (1892) and Regina Diaz (1894). He achieved his greatest success with Andrea Chénier (1896), with libretto by Luigi Illica. He repeated success with Fedora (1898), which was followed by a series of failures, until he renewed fame with La cena delle beffe (The Supper of Mockery, 1924). Cilea abandoned law for music. He achieved an early success with Gina (1889), which was followed by La tilda (1892), L'arlesiana (1897) and his masterpiece, Adriana Lecouvreur (1902), a mixture of tragedy and comedy, in which he combined verismo with a certain bel canto.

E lucevan le stelle, aria from Tosca (1900), by Giacomo Puccini

Otros exponentes fueron: Franco Alfano (Resurrection, 1904), Alberto Franchetti (Christopher Columbus, 1892; Germany, 1902), Franco Leoni (The Oracle, 1905; Francesca da Rimini, 1914), Giacomo Orefice (Chopin, 1901; The Moses, 1905) and Antonio Smareglia (Istrian Wedding, 1895; The Moth, 1897).

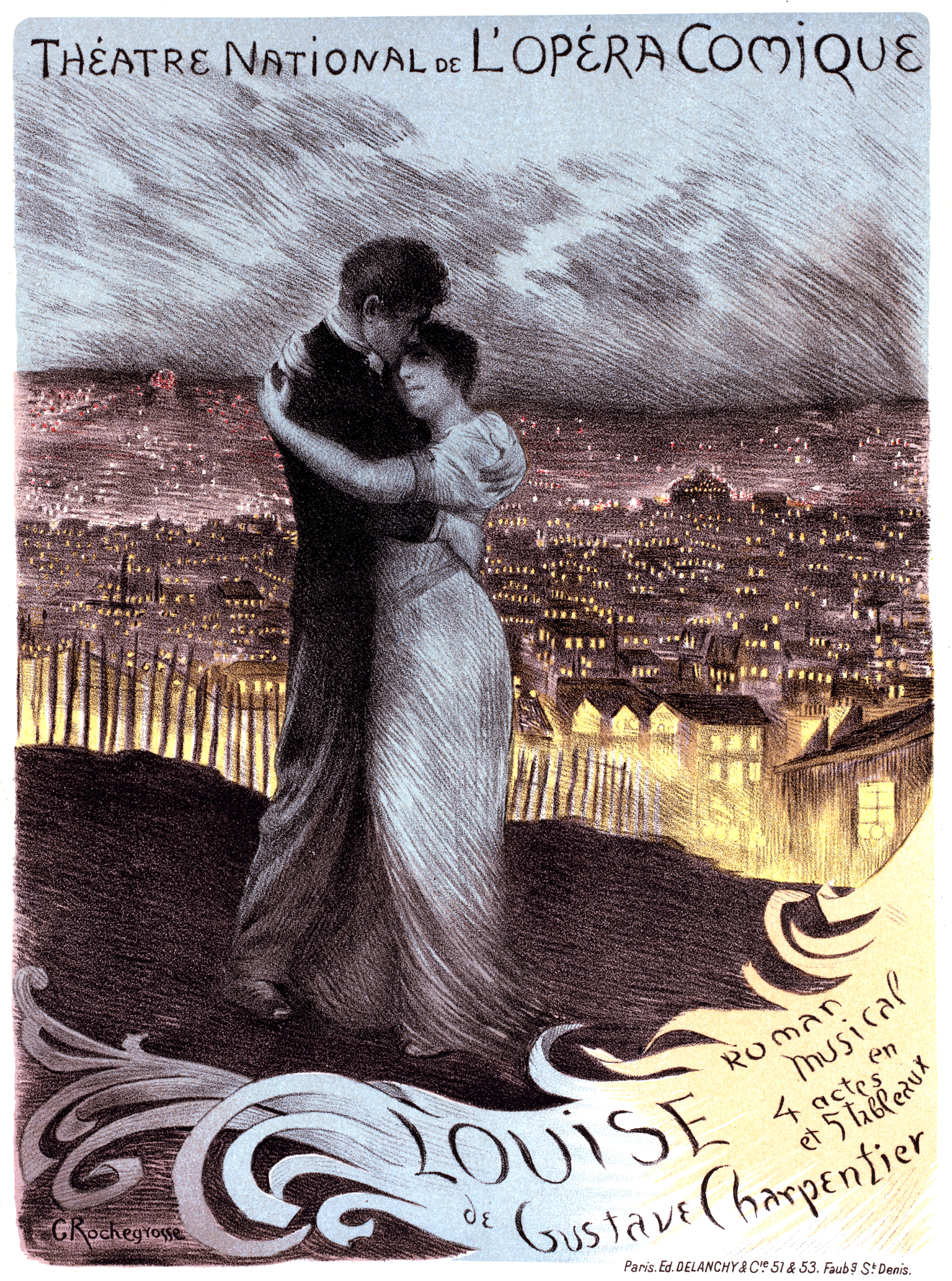
Poster for Louise (1900), by Gustave Charpentier

Close to verismo, but with a more personal style is Ermanno Wolf-Ferrari. A student of Arrigo Boito, he was an inconstant composer, who seemed not to find his own style. He made veristic works, as well as serious and comic operas, among which stand out: Cenerentola (1900), Le donne curiose (1903), I quatro rusteghi (1906), Il segreto di Susanna (1909) and L'amore medico (1913), which have not lasted in the operatic repertoire.

In the 1910s this style evolved towards a so-called post-Verismo, characterized by the strong influence of the writer Gabriele D'Annunzio and a stronger link to Italian nationalism. Prominent in this current were Italo Montemezzi and Riccardo Zandonai. The former, a largely self-taught composer and conductor, had great success with his first two operas, Giovanni Gallurese (1905) and L'amore dei tre re (1913). He later produced La nave (1918), La notte di Zoraima (1931) and L'incantesimo (1943). Zandonai attracted the attention of the publisher Ricordi with La coppa del re (1907), so he commissioned an opera, Il grillo del focolare (1908), based on a Dickens short story. His first great success was Francesca da Rimini (1914), based on an episode of the Divine Comedy by Dante. He developed a more original style in Giulietta e Romeo (1922), which was followed by I cavalieri di Ekebù (1925). He left his last opera, Il bacio, unfinished. Mention should also be made of Alfredo Casella, a composer of cosmopolitan style who was also influenced by post-Romantic and impressionism, author of La donna serpente (1929).

Outside Italy, the veristic influence is denoted in the work of the French Gustave Charpentier. He was a pupil of Massenet and, in 1887, won the Rome prize. It was in that city that he was infected by the verist atmosphere and composed his most famous opera, Louise (1900), the love story of two young people from Montmartre, with libretto by Saint-Pol-Roux. Also in France, Alfred Bruneau set to music several texts by Émile Zola, such as Le rêve (1891), L'Attaque du moulin (1893), Messidor (1897), L'Ouragan (1901) and L'Enfant roi (1905). Henry Février was the author of Monna Vanna (1909), on a text by Maurice Maeterlinck, a semi-Viverist work of symbolist inspiration.

In Germany, Eugen d'Albert was a prolific composer, author of some twenty operas, including Die Abreise (The Departure Journey, 1898) and Tiefland (1903), the latter based on Lowland by Ángel Guimerá.

The Czech Josef Bohuslav Foerster started in a veristic style with his first two operas Debora (1893) and Eva (1899). Later he was the author of Jessika (1905), based on Shakespeare's The Merchant of Venice, as well as Nepřemožení (The Invincibles, 1919), Srdce (The Heart, 1923) and Bloud (The Klutz, 1936).

The Greek Spyridon Samaras was the author of operas in Italian in the veristic style: La martire (1894), La furia domata (1895), Rhea (1908).

=== Post-romanticism ===
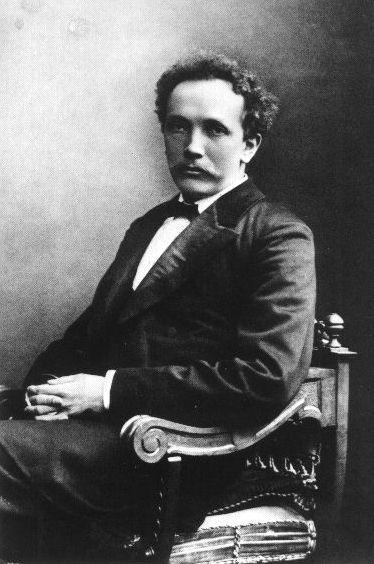
Richard Strauss

Between the late nineteenth and early twentieth centuries there was the post-Romanticism, which as its name suggests was an evolution of Romanticism based on more modern premises, but maintaining the same spirit that characterized that movement. The main influence of this style was Wagner, so it is sometimes also called post-Wagnerism.

Its main representative was Richard Strauss, who was noted for his harmonic creativity and mastery of orchestration. Under Wagner's influence he started in opera with Guntram (1894) and Feuersnot (The Need for Fire, 1901), which failed. On the other hand, he enjoyed public favor with Salome (1905), based on the play of the same name by Oscar Wilde, despite the scandal caused by the erotic charge of the plot. Since then he began a collaboration with the Austrian playwright Hugo von Hofmannsthal, who wrote most of his librettos. Their first joint work was Elektra (1909), which was followed by Der Rosenkavalier (The Knight of the Rose, 1911), Ariadne auf Naxos (1912), Die Frau ohne Schatten (The Woman Without a Shadow, 1919), Die ägyptische Helena (The Egyptian Helen, 1928) and Arabella (1933). He later counted on Stefan Zweig for Die schweigsame Frau (The Silent Woman, 1935) and on Joseph Gregor for Friedenstag (Day of Peace, 1938), Daphne (1938) and Die Liebe der Danae (Danae's Love, 1940). His last opera was Capriccio (1942). In these works he introduced a new harmonic language that crossed traditional tonal boundaries, with passionate sounds that could include screams and other guttural sounds, thus anticipating later expressionism.

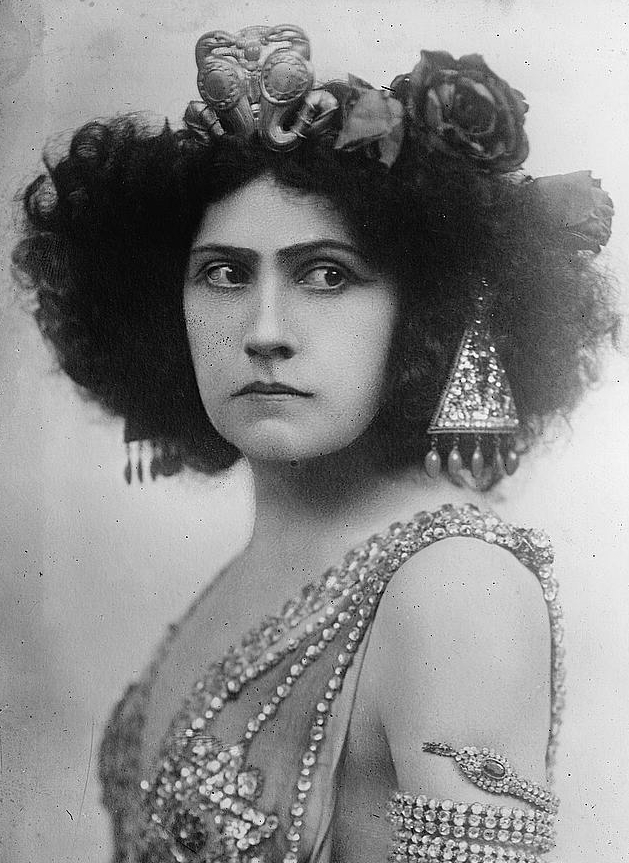
Soprano Aino Ackté in the opera Salome (1905), by Richard Strauss

Other exponents were Engelbert Humperdinck, Alexander von Zemlinsky and Hans Pfitzner. Humperdinck was a gifted student, who in 1881 met Wagner, who took him on as an assistant for the production of Parsifal. However, his production was oriented towards a simpler line, as in Hänsel und Gretel (1893), his first and most successful opera, based on the fairy tale by the Brothers Grimm. He chose the same authors for his next project, Die sieben Geißlein (The Seven Children, 1898), which was not so successful. After several more failures, he succeeded with Königskinder (The King's Children, 1910), more Wagnerian in style. Zemlinsky devoted himself to opera as both composer and conductor. His first success was Es war einmal (Once upon a time, 1899), which he performed Gustav Mahler at the Vienna Hofoper. In 1906 he composed Der Traumgörge (Görge the Dreamer), which was not premiered until forty years later. It was followed by his two greatest hits, Eine florentinische Tragödie (A Florentine Tragedy, 1917) and Der Zwerg (The Dwarf, 1922), both one-acts. In 1932, Der Kreidekreis (The Chalk Circle) was banned by the Nazis, after which he went into exile in the United States, where he died in anonymity. Pfitzner was influenced by Schumann and Wagner, noticeable in his early operas: Der arme Heinrich (Poor Heinrich, 1893) and Die Rose vom Liebesgarten (The Rose in the Garden of Love, 1900). His greatest success was Palestrina (1917), a major work on the position of the artist in society. His next works, Von deutscher Seele (Of the German Soul, 1921) and Das dunkle Reich (The Dark Kingdom, 1929), expressed his ideas about a "pure" German music.

"Evening Prayer", from the opera Hänsel und Gretel (1893), by Engelbert Humperdinck

The Austrian Erich Wolfgang Korngold was considered a child prodigy, and aroused the admiration of Mahler, Puccini and Strauss. His first operas were Der Ring des Polykrates (The Ring of Polycrates, 1916), Violanta (1916) and Die Tote Stadt (The Dead City, 1920), of late romanticism. Das Wunder der Heliane (The Miracle of Heliane, 1927) was a work of a certain eroticism with a score conceived on an epic scale that creates great difficulty for the performers. With the establishment of the Anschluss in 1938, he emigrated to the United States, where he composed film scores and won two Oscars.

In the Germanic field it is also worth mentioning: Wilhelm Kienzl (Der Evangelimann [The Evangelist], 1895), Max von Schillings (Moloch, 1900; Mona Lisa, 1915), Siegfried Wagner—son of Richard Wagner—(Der Bärenhäuter [The Bearskin], 1899; Der Kobold [The Goblin], 1904; Der Schmied von Marienburg [The Blacksmith of Marienburg], 1923) and Hugo Wolf (Der Corregidor, 1895).

The British Rutland Boughton attempted to establish an "English-style Wagnerism", with operas such as The Immortal Hour (1922), Alkestis (1922), The Queen of Cornwall (1924) and The Lily Maid (1934). Similarly, Joseph Holbrooke sought to transfer to Celtic mythology the Wagnerian universe, through the trilogy The Cauldron of Annwyn (1912–1929), consisting of The Children of Don (1912), Dylan, Son of the Wave (1914) and Bronwen (1929).

In France, Gabriel Fauré showed a clear Wagnerian influence in his opera Pénélope (1913). Jean Nouguès was the author of Quo Vadis? (1909), on Henryk Sienkiewicz's novel, a work of an ambitious staging that included circus animals.

In Italy, Luigi Mancinelli showed a clearly Wagnerian style, although with a more cosmopolitan component, not as Germanized as that of other followers of the German composer. His two best works were Ero e Leandro (1897) and Paolo e Francesca (1907).

=== Impressionism ===
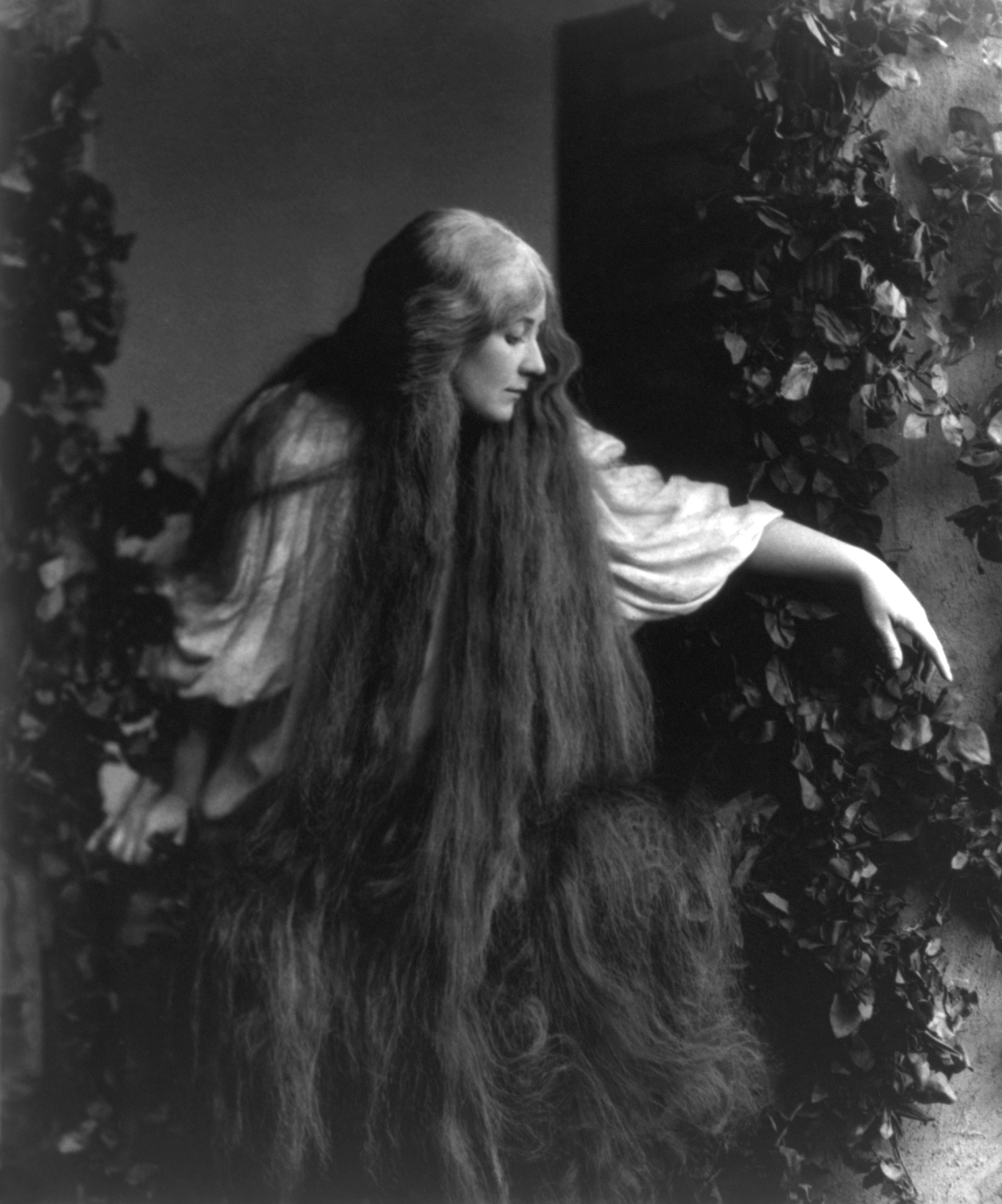
Mary Garden in a performance of Pelléas et Mélisande by Claude Debussy (1908)

Like his pictorial homologue, impressionism arose in France, with a desire to modernize musical conception, which developed between the end of the 19th century and the beginning of the 20th. As in painting, it was intended to capture the sensations that the artist produced the surrounding world, with a basis of reality, but interpreted subjectively. Influenced by symbolist poetry (Verlaine, Baudelaire, Mallarmé), they also sought a new language confronting both the formal purism of classicism and the passionate violence of Romanticism. To this end, Claude Debussy, its main representative, resorted to a scale of tones not used until then, whole tones and complex intervals from the ninth onwards, as well as intervals of parallel fourths and fifths.

Claude Debussy began several operatic projects that he left unfinished-a couple on stories by Edgar Allan Poe and one on Cid entitled Rodrigue et Chimène—until he found a project that fascinated him: Pelléas et Mélisande (1902), on a work by Maurice Maeterlinck. It was his only opera, but a masterpiece. Despite its simple plot – a love rivalry between two brothers and a young girl – Debussy created a profound and moving work, evocative and suggestive, that is still novel today. With this work he initiated the genre of literary opera (Literaturoper), a type of opera based on literary texts respected in their integrity which, while they can be reduced, cannot be altered in their essence, and which are declaimed in the style of the Russian opéra dialogué and presented in transcomposed form.

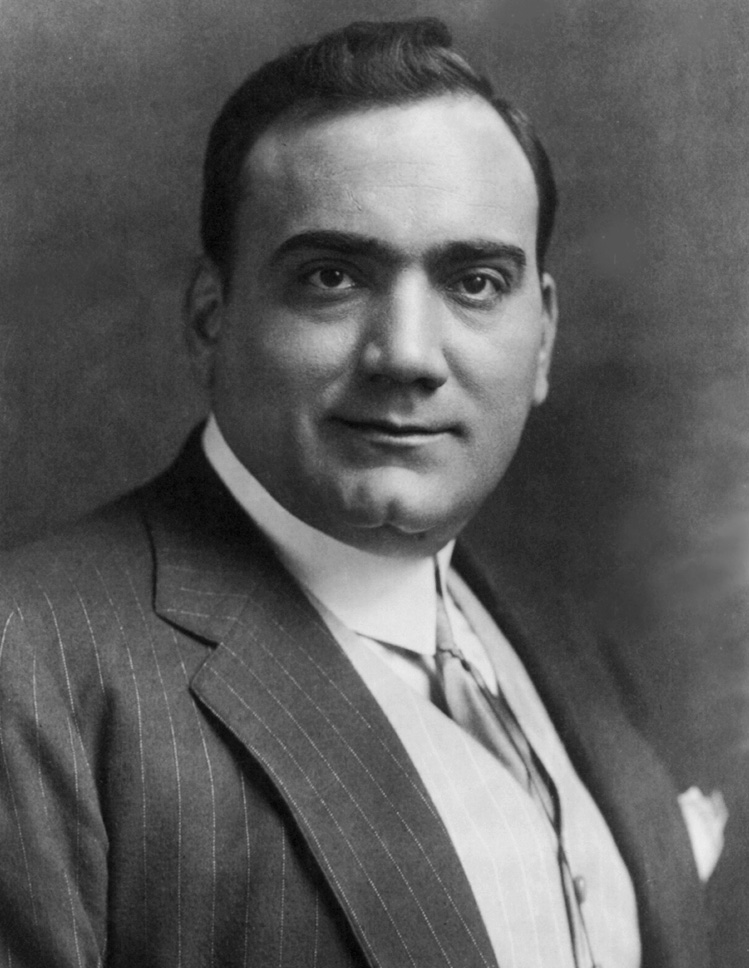
Enrico Caruso, one of the most famous tenors of all time

In France, Maurice Ravel and Paul Dukas also stood out. Ravel was a convinced anti-Wagnerian, who eagerly searched for his own style. He was very meticulous and nonconformist in his work, so he continually revised his works, which explains his scarce production. With a Basque mother, he felt great attraction for Spanish culture, which is evident in his first opera, L'heure espagnole (La hora española, 1911), a one-act comic work, with sound effects of machines and clocks. His next opera was L'enfant et les sortilèges (1925), with a libretto by Colette. Dukas initially accused Wagnerian influence, as denoted in Horn et Riemenhild (1892) and L'arbre de science (1899), which he left unfinished. He completed only one opera, Ariane et Barbe-bleu (1907), based on the text by Maurice Maeterlinck, where he mixed Wagnerian chromaticism with the pentatonic scale used by Debussy.

The Italian Ottorino Respighi attempted to combine impressionism with traditional music, especially Baroque. His first two operas were of comic genre: Re Enzo (1905) and Semirâma (1910). He subsequently produced Belfagor (1923), La campana sommersa (1927), La Fiamma (1934) and Lucrezia (1937).

British Frederick Delius approached impressionism departing from Wagnerian influence. He only turned to opera early in his career: Koanga (1904), A Village Romeo and Juliet (1907), Fennimore and Gerda (1919).

The Swiss Ernest Bloch brought together the influence of Debussy with that of Richard Strauss. He produced a single opera, Macbeth (1910). In 1916 he emigrated to the United States, where he began an opera that he left unfinished, Jezebel

=== Singers of the end of the century ===
At the turn of the century they stood out vocally: Mattia Battistini, Italian baritone with a high-pitched, crystalline voice, adjusted to what was called baritenor at the time; Enrico Caruso, Italian tenor, one of the most famous of all time, with a flexible tone that allowed him a great variety of roles; Fyodor Chaliapin, Russian bass who performed both the repertoire of his country and Rossini, Bellini and Verdi; Emmy Destinn, Czech soprano who excelled in roles by Puccini and Strauss; Geraldine Farrar, American soprano with great stage presence; the same nationality had the soprano Mary Garden, who excelled in the leading role of Debussy's Pelléas et Mélisande; Hipólito Lázaro, Spanish tenor of the Verist repertoire; Victor Maurel, French baritone admired by Verdi, who gave him several roles; Nellie Melba, Australian soprano of great virtuosity; Claudia Muzio, Italian soprano who excelled in tragic roles, mainly in Verist operas; Elisabeth Schumann, German soprano of high and delicate voice, interpreter of Mozart, Wagner and Strauss; Francisco Viñas, Spanish tenor of wide register who could sing both lyric and heroic tenor; and Giovanni Zenatello, Italian tenor of great facility for the highest register.

== 20th century ==
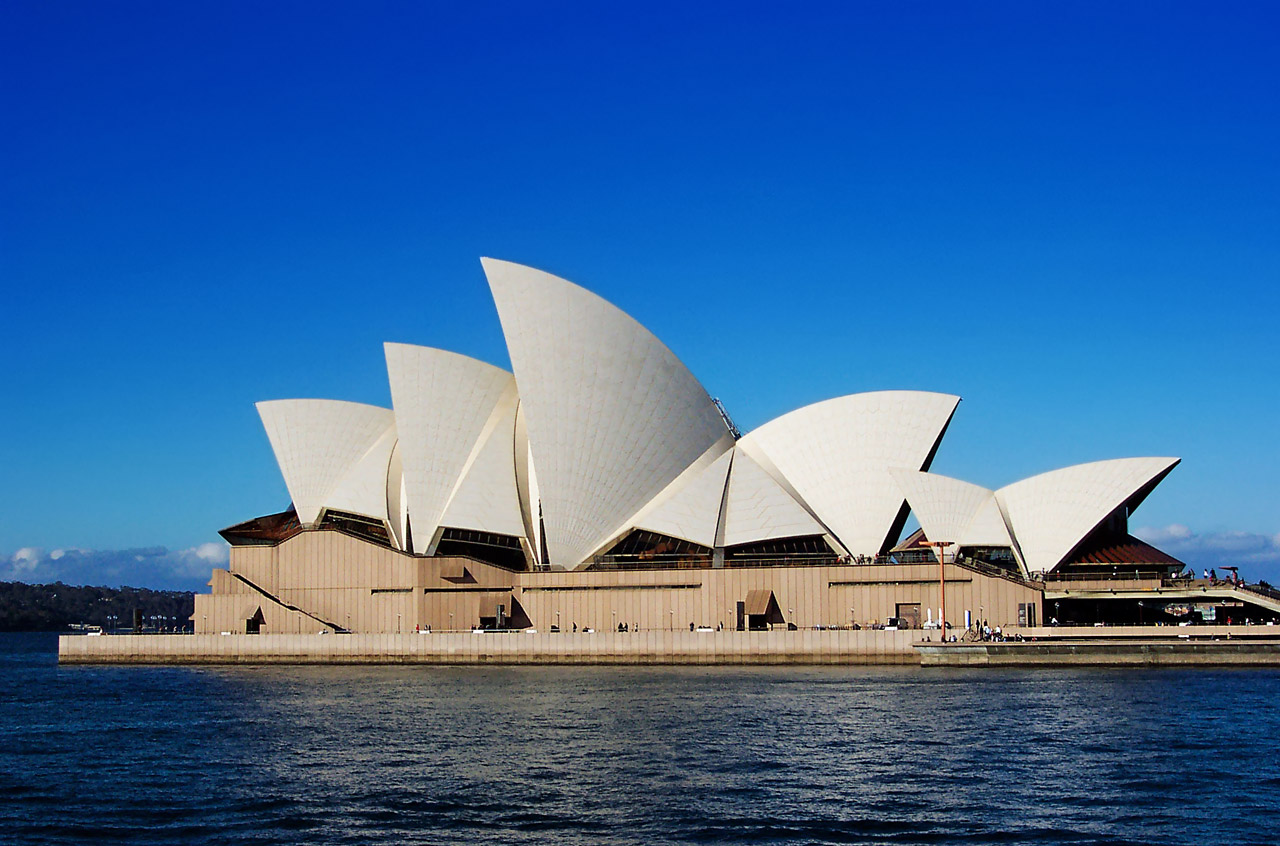
Sydney Opera House, opened in 1973, designed by Danish architect Jørn Utzon

The 20th century saw a great revolution in music, motivated by the profound political and social changes that took place during the century. The transforming, experimental and renovating interest of the artistic avant-gardes was translated into a new musical language, at the same time that a technical renovation took place, motivated by the appearance of new technologies, such as electronic music. All this resulted in new compositional methods and new sound ranges, which were adapted to the new musical movements that were happening in the course of the century. The new music composed in this century broke radically with the past and sought a new language, breaking the scheme of traditional musical discourse: if necessary, harmony, melody and tonality were broken. Many of these innovations caused bewilderment, especially atonality, in a public accustomed to a hierarchy of notes where a fundamental note dominated; in atonality, each note has equal relevance to the others. For this reason, contemporary music has not enjoyed great public success and has often been confined to a closed circle of intellectuals.

Opera in the twentieth century maintained the previous repertoire, which continued to be successfully performed in the best theaters and auditoriums of the world, while, at the production level, although there was a copious and excellent production, the innovations produced in this field did not enjoy great success among the majority public. The composers' eagerness to experiment provoked harsh criticism and controversy, if not even censorship or political persecution: in the Soviet Union, Stalin forced Shostakovich to adhere to the regime's cultural guidelines after attending a performance of Lady Macbeth of Mtsensk in 1936; in Nazi Germany, avant-garde composers were classified as degenerate musicians, and many had to go into exile. During this century, there was even experimentation with the traditional operatic repertoire through avant-garde productions, more modern scenographies and contemporary adaptations of classical operas, as was the trend in the 1920s at the Kroll Opera in Berlin or as carried out by Wieland Wagner—grandson of the composer—at the Bayreuth Festival. On the other hand, in this period the fascination with opera singers continued and even increased, sometimes becoming highly popular phenomena, such as the so-called Tres Tenores (Luciano Pavarotti, José Carreras and Plácido Domingo). It is worth noting that the technical advances that allowed voice recording popularized this genre domestically: Enrico Caruso, for example, was one of the singers who was most lavish in recording his performances, thus increasing his popularity. (Note: The first partial opera recording on gramophone was a selection of Caruso's hits, recorded in Milan in 1902, while the first recorded opera was Verdi's Il trovatore, recorded between 1903 and 1906 Alier (2007, p. 434.).) Other media that contributed to the diffusion of opera were radio, cinema and television. in 1951, the first television opera, Amahl and the Night Visitors, by Gian Carlo Menotti, was composed.

This century saw numerous novelties in the field of scenography: from verismo emerged a more sober and realistic trend in stage representation, whose pioneers were André Antoine, founder of the Théâtre Libre in Paris, and Otto Brahm, at the head of the Freie Bühne in Berlin. Max Reinhardt, director of the Deutsches Theater, introduced numerous innovations, such as three-dimensional sets and the use of lighting to create atmosphere. Another innovator was Alfred Roller, who teamed up with Gustav Mahler, conductor at the Vienna Hofoper, both of whom strove to integrate the stage performance with the musical drama as a unified whole.

At the beginning of this century emerged the chamber opera, a minor modality of the genre composed of one-act works, with few characters and a reduced orchestra, a format similar to the género chico of the Spanish zarzuela. Examples would be L'heure espagnole by Ravel (1911), Arlecchino by Busoni (1917) and Histoire du soldat by Stravinski (1918). In Vienna, the Kammeroper, dedicated to this genre, was founded in 1953. The English composer Benjamin Britten went so far as to found his own chamber opera orchestra, the English Opera Group. On the other hand, the traditional operetta genre evolved into the musical, a revamped genre that relied more on popular music and dance, in centers such as the West End theaters in London or the Broadway theaters in New York. Other media that contributed to the diffusion of opera were radio, cinema and television. (Note: In 1920 the first complete opera was broadcast on radio,Parsifal by Richard Wagner, from the Teatro Colón in Buenos Aires. Alier (2007, p. 274).) in 1951, the first television opera, Amahl and the Night Visitors, by Gian Carlo Menotti, was composed.

Another phenomenon of relevance in this century was the proliferation of opera festivals, which counted on the example of the Bayreuth Festival (1876). In 1901 the Munich Festival appeared, followed by the Savonlinna (1912), Verona (1913), Salzburg (1920), Florence (Maggio Musicale Fiorentino, 1933), Glyndebourne (1934), Ravinia (1936), Edinburgh (1947), Aldeburgh (1948), Aix-en-Provence (1948), Santander (1952), Spoleto (1958), Tanglewood (1970) and Peralada (1987), among the most famous.

In an article published by Opera Holland Park, the opera director Ella Marchment explained that for every hour of a performance, an opera director will complete 150 hours of preparation and rehearsals; or 2.5 hours of work for every minute of onstage time.

=== Expressionism ===
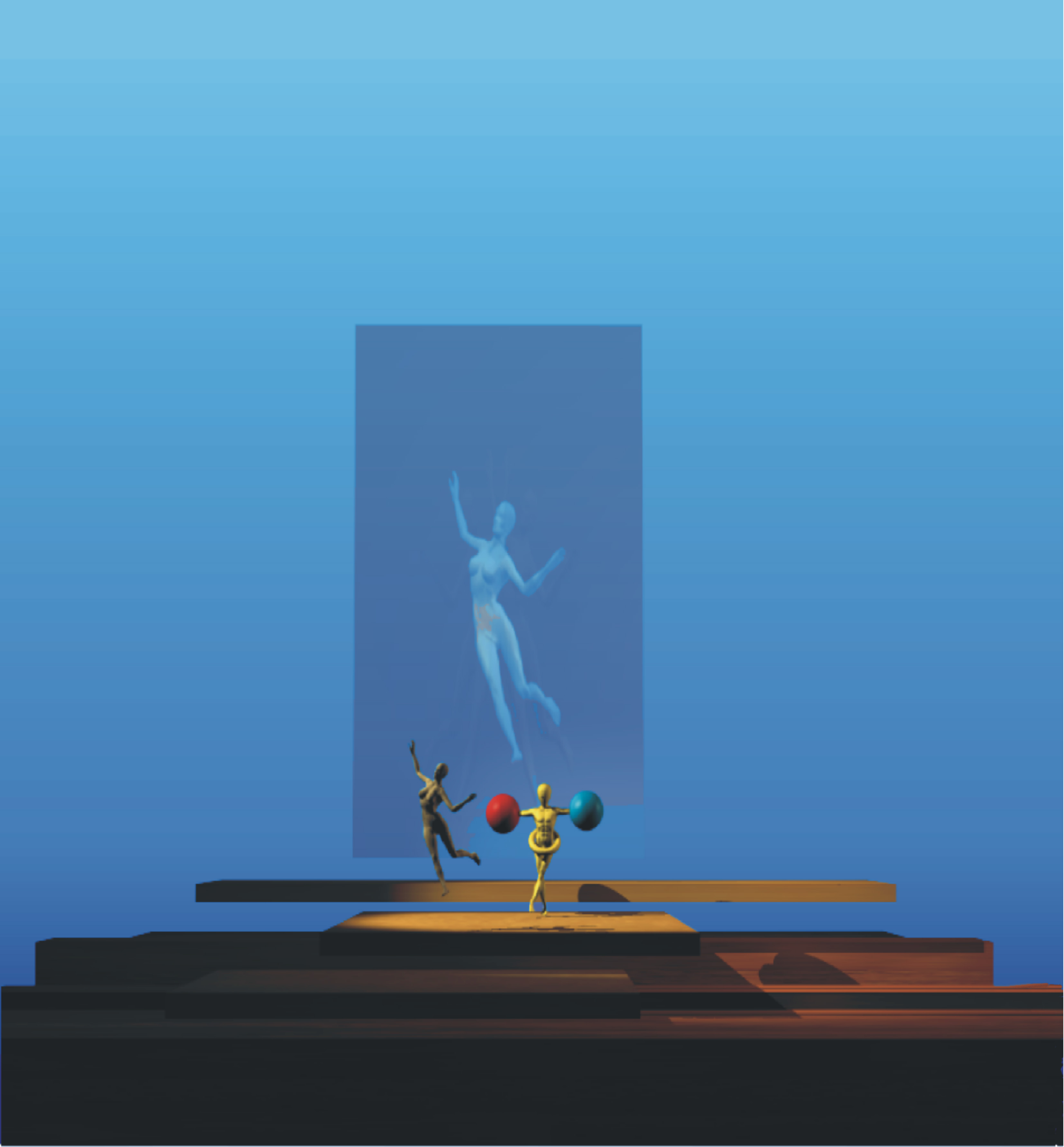
Performance of Les mamelles de Tirésias by Francis Poulenc (2001)

The expressionism emerged at the beginning of the century as a style fundamentally concerned with the inner expressiveness of the individual, in its psychological deepening, as opposed to the dominant naturalism at the turn of the century, which in opera gave the verismo. In this current, interpersonal relationships, emotionality and the psychic states of the characters were especially valued. On a literary level, its referents were Franz Kafka, James Joyce and the German playwrights Ernst Toller, Frank Wedekind and Georg Kaiser. For expressionist authors, art was a form of expression, not entertainment, so they were more concerned with the message they wanted to convey than with style or musical or plot device.

In France, this style was practiced by some composers who formed a group called Les Six (Francis Poulenc, Darius Milhaud, Arthur Honegger, Germaine Tailleferre, Georges Auric and Louis Durey), interested in musical avant-garde and popular rhythms, with an informal and spontaneous style. Poulenc, author of his own librettos, stood out for his lyrical melodies. His first opera was Les mamelles de Tirésias (The Breasts of Tiresias, 1947), on a text by Guillaume Apollinaire. It was followed by Dialogues des Carmélites (1957), based on a work by Georges Bernanos. In La voix humaine (The Human Voice, 1959) he presented an opera with only a soprano speaking on the telephone for forty minutes, with a libretto by Jean Cocteau. Milhaud was a pupil of Paul Dukas and Vincent d'Indy. He produced major historical works, such as Christophe Colomb (1930), Bolivar (1950) and David (1954), as well as minor works: Les Malheurs d'Orphée (The Evils of Orpheus, 1926), Le pauvre matelot (The Poor Sailor, 1927) and La mère coupable (The Guilty Mother, 1966). Honegger began in the operatic field with Philippa (1903), which was followed by Judith (1925), Antigone (1927) and the operettas Les Aventures du roi Pausole (1930), La Belle de Moudon (1931) and Les Petites Cardinales (1937). Also in 1937 he composed jointly with Jacques Ibert L'Aiglon, his last opera. Linked to this group was Erik Satie, best known for his symphonic and piano compositions, who composed several operettas: Geneviève de Brabant (1899), Pousse l'amour (1905), Le Piège de Méduse (1913). Also worth mentioning are Jacques Ibert (Angélique, 1927; Le Roi d'Yvetot, 1930).

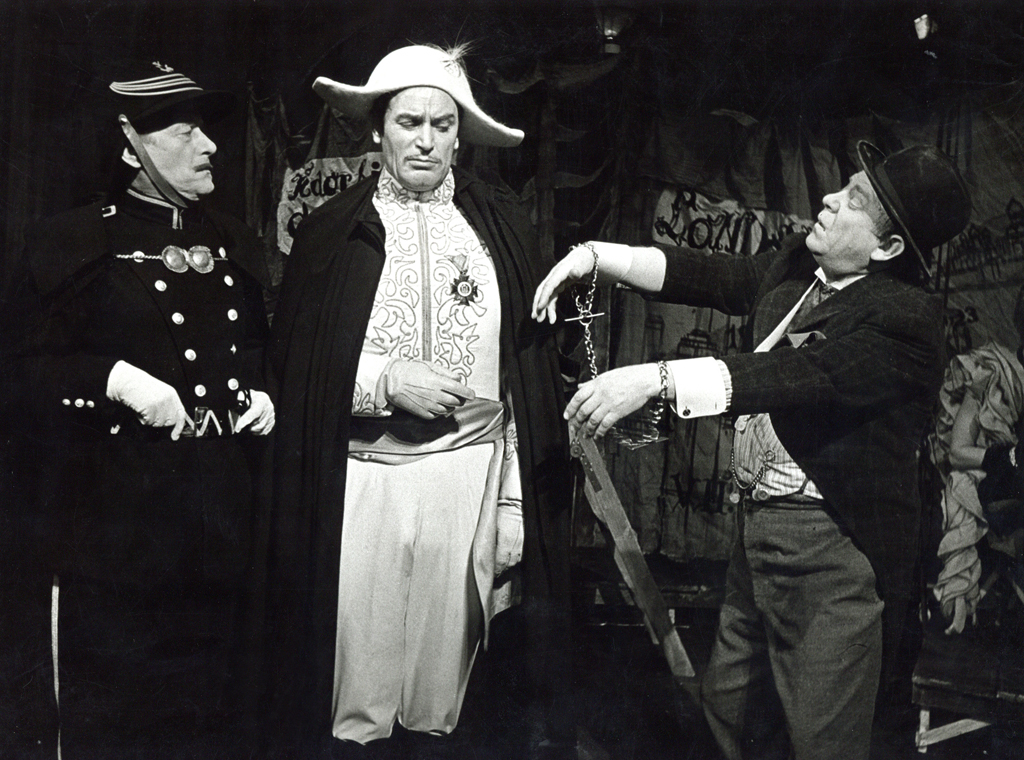
Performance of Die Dreigroschenoper (The Threepenny Opera), by Kurt Weill (1961)

In Germany, Franz Schreker began in post-romanticism, but later opted for a style close to expressionism. His first opera was Der ferne Klang (The Far Sound, 1910), with which he achieved great success. It was followed by Die Gezeichneten (The Marked Ones, 1918), an opera of great complexity that required an orchestra of 120 musicians, with a somber and tortured theme, fully immersed in the depressing spirit of the postwar period. In Der Schatzgräber (The Treasure Hunter, 1920) he also showed a theme centered on loneliness, despair and sexual desire. His last works, Christophorus (1931) and Der Schmied von Gent (The Blacksmith of Ghent, 1932), were sabotaged by the Nazis, who considered him a degenerate musician, with the accentuated motif of being Jewish.

Paul Hindemith started in expressionism with three one-act operas (Mörder, Hoffnung der Frauen [Murder, Hope of Women], 1919; Das Nusch-Nuschi, 1920; Sancta Susanna, 1921), but later evolved into a neo-baroque style with use of polyphony. In that sense, Cardillac (1926) was a transitional work, while in Mathis der Maler (Matthias the Painter, 1928) he combined medieval influences with German folklore and counterpoint techniques. After being considered a degenerate musician by the Nazis, he went into exile in Switzerland and the United States. Die Harmonie der Welt (The Harmony of the World, 1957) was the culmination of his neo-baroque style.

Kurt Weill was a representative of the so-called New Objectivity (Neue Sachlichkeit), a movement that in a certain way reacted against expressionist subjectivism, although it used many of its resources, while having points in common with neoclassicism and assimilating new musical forms such as jazz, tango or cabaret. He sought in his works a type of musical theater that featured the best artists and professionals, from playwrights to dancers. His first operas were Der Protagonist (1926) and Der Zar lässt sich photographieren (The Tsar Has His Photograph Taken, 1928). From then on he formed a fruitful partnership with the playwright Bertolt Brecht, which produced numerous successes: Die Dreigroschenoper (The Threepenny Opera, 1928), Happy End (1929), Aufstieg und Fall der Stadt Mahagonny (Rise and Fall of the City of Mahagonny, 1929) and Der Jasager (The Yes-Sayer, 1930). His greatest success was The Threepenny Opera, based on The Beggar's Opera by John Gay and Johann Christoph Pepusch. In 1933 he premiered Der Silbersee (The Silver Lake), with a libretto by Georg Kaiser. Shortly thereafter he went into exile in the United States, where he made several musicals.

Erwin Schulhoff composed in 1928 his opera Flammen (Flames), a work of a fantastic nature, in which the author abandoned the Aristotelian theatrical rules in force until then in theater and opera for the sake of a new concept of staging, which understood theater as a game, a show, a fantasy overflowing reality. Berthold Goldschmidt, a pupil of Schreker, was director of the Darmstadt Opera. In 1930 he adapted Fernand Crommelynck's Der gewaltige Hahnrei (The Mighty Cuckold), premiered in 1932, although his Jewishness caused it to be immediately withdrawn, so he emigrated to the UK.

=== Dodecaphony ===
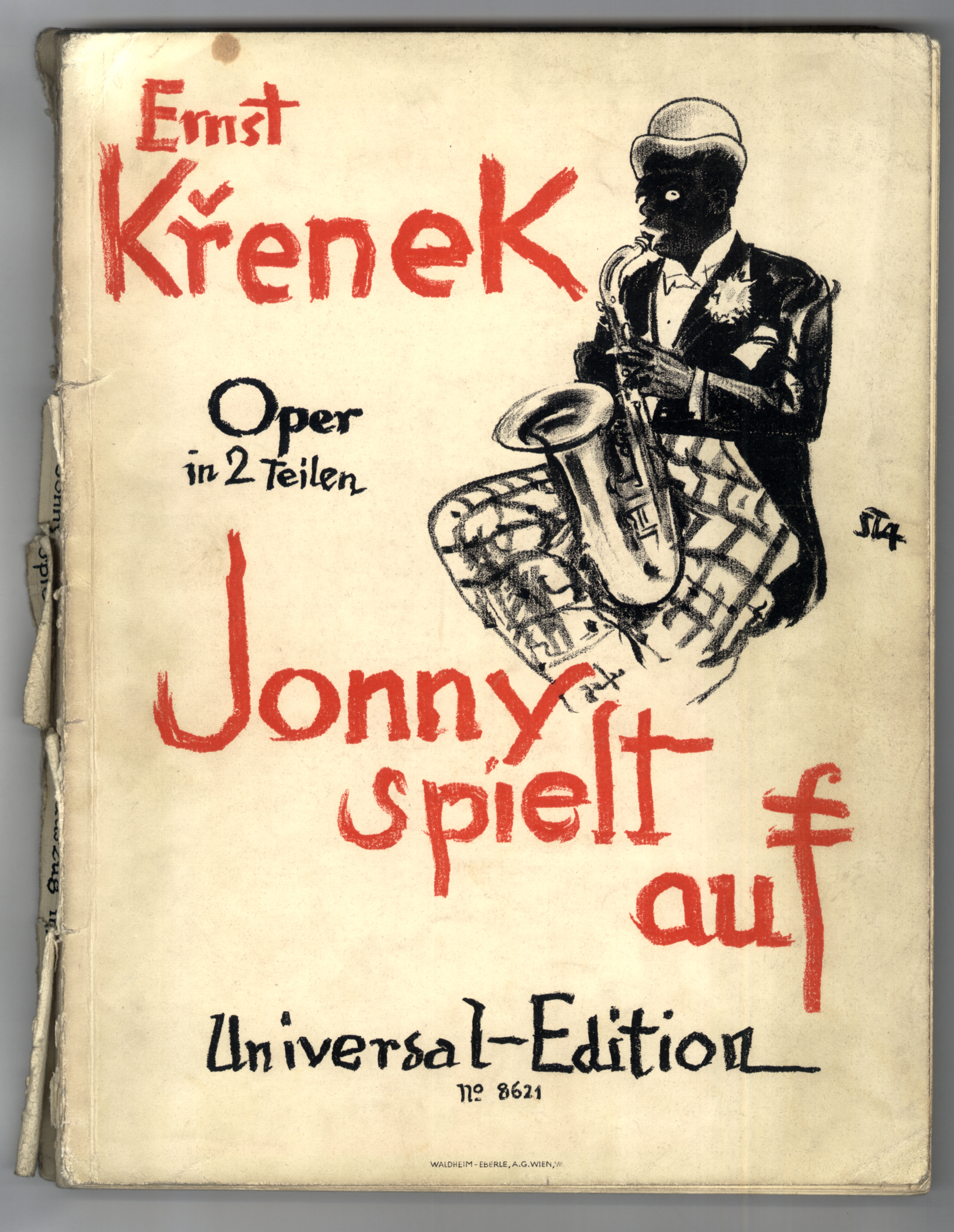
Handbill for the opera Jonny spielt auf (1927), by Ernst Krenek

The spirit of renewal at the turn of the century, which led all the arts to a break with the past and to seek a new creative impulse, led the Austrian composer Arnold Schönberg to create a system where all notes have the same value and harmony is replaced by the progression of tones. In dodecaphonism, the twelve notes of the scale (the main and intermediate notes) are used, but breaking the hierarchy between them. Stylistically, dodecaphonism was strongly linked to expressionism. Schönberg composed two operas in this context: Moses und Aron (composed from 1926 and unfinished) and Von Heute auf Morgen (From Today to Tomorrow, 1930). But undoubtedly, the great opera of atonalism was Wozzeck (1925), by Alban Berg, based on the play by Georg Büchner, a romantic opera in terms of thematic, but of complex musical structure, where he experimented with all available musical resources from classicism to the avant-garde, from tonal to atonal, from recitative to music, from popular music to sophisticated music of dissonant counterpoint. A work of strong psychological expression, it united musical atonalism with argumental expressionism. His second opera, Lulu (1929–1935), based on two dramas by Frank Wedekind, was closer to dodecaphonism, and applied Wagnerian transcomposition. The work remained incomplete and was completed by Friedrich Cerha in 1979.

In 1927, Ernst Krenek premiered his opera Jonny spielt auf (Jonny begins to play), which achieved a remarkable success and was the most performed opera of the time. Greatly influenced by jazz, Krenek experimented with the main musical trends of the time: neo-romanticism, neoclassicism, atonality, dodecaphonism and other styles. In 1934 he composed Karl V with serialist technique, which included filmed and pantomime scenes. With the advent of Nazism he emigrated to the United States, where he composed Der goldene Bock (The Golden Fleece, 1964) and Der Zauberspiegel (The Magic Mirror, 1966).

Viktor Ullmann was a pupil of Schönberg and, although he did not use atonality, his work employed the chromaticism of the modern Vienna School. His first opera was Der Sturz des Antichrist (The Fall of the Antichrist, 1935). Being Jewish, he was interned in the Theresienstadt concentration camp (Terezín), where he composed his opera Der Kaiser Von Atlantis (The Emperor of Atlantis, 1944). However, before its release it was banned by the SS, who found some similarity between the protagonist and the figure of Hitler, and the author was sent to the Auschwitz camp for extermination. The same fate befell the Czech Hans Krása, author of the children's opera Brundibár (1941).

Another field of experimentation was microtonalism, in which microtones, musical intervals smaller than a semitone, were used. Prominent in this current was the Czech Alois Hába, author of the opera Matka (The Mother, 1931), which because of its ineffectiveness has been scarcely performed.

=== Neoclassicism ===
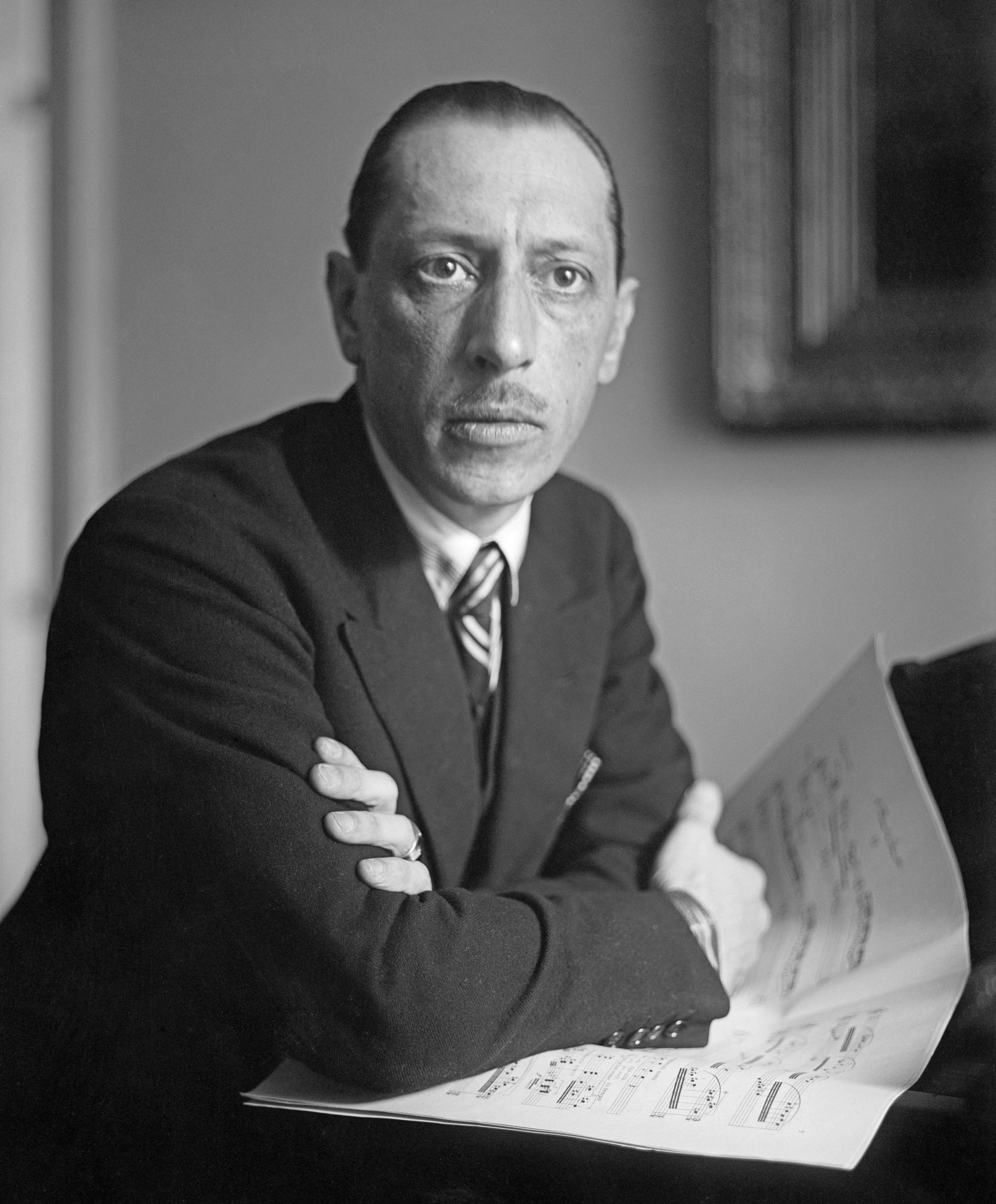
Igor Stravinsky

The neoclassicism was a return to the musical models of eighteenth-century classicism, characterized by restraint, balance and formal clarity. It developed especially in the interwar period (1920s and 1930s). Its models were basically the classicists, but also recovered baroque forms, as well as various expressive options such as dissonance. In general, more objective and defined musical forms were sought, with a more contrasted and diaphanous timbre, repetitive rhythms – with frequent use of ostinato—and a more diatonic harmony, far from Wagnerian chromaticism.

One of the countries where this style was most prevalent was the Soviet Union. Its main representative, Igor Stravinsky, was close to expressionism, although he can sometimes be described as neoclassical, but more than anything else he was an unclassifiable genius with a surprising palette of sounds of great variety; he himself never wanted to be associated with any particular style. In his beginnings, still influenced by Russian folklore, and with a certain influence of French impressionism, he enjoyed great success with his ballets, represented by the Ballets Russes of Sergey Diaghilev. After them, he began a new stage of a more sober musicality, reducing instrumental resources, which is evident in his first opera, Le rossignol (The Nightingale, 1914), based on a tale by Hans Christian Andersen, which combined neo-romantic and orientalist influences. His next stage work was Mavra (1922), a tribute to the Russian school of traditional opera. A more ambitious project was Œdipus Rex (1927), with a libretto by Jean Cocteau translated into Latin, in neoclassical style. After these works, all short, his only full-length opera was The Rake's Progress (The Rake's Progress, 1951), based on a series of etchings by William Hogarth that he saw at the Art Institute of Chicago, which were dramatized by the poet Wystan Hugh Auden.

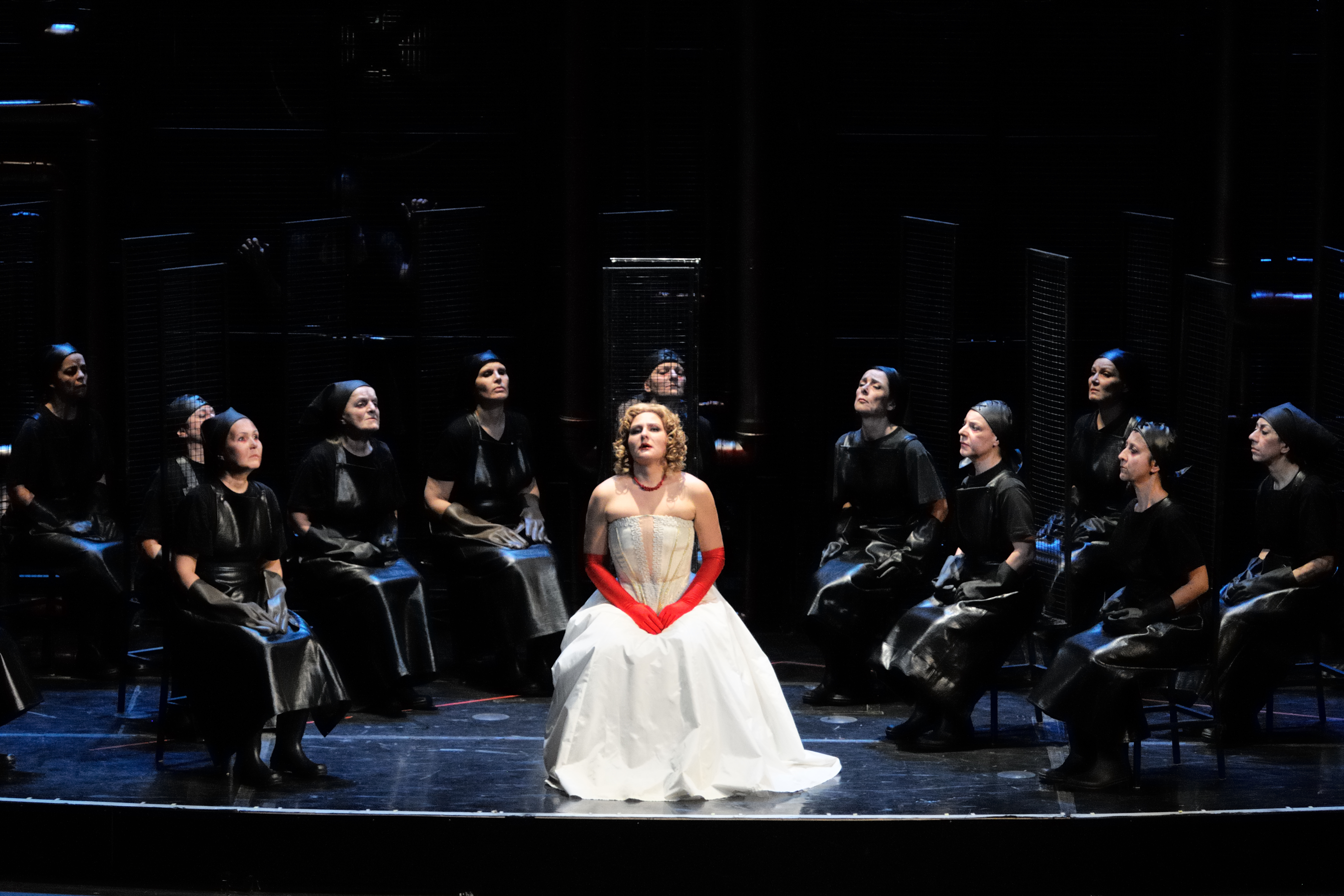
Performance of Lady Macbeth of Mtsensk by Dmitri Shostakovich, Teatro Comunale of Bologna (2014)

Dmitri Shostakovich lived all his life under the censorship magnifying glass of the Soviet regime, but he achieved some of the best compositions of the century. His first opera was Nos (The Nose, 1928), a critique of the reign of Nicolas I. His masterpiece was Ledi Mákbet Mtsénskogo Uyezda (Lady Macbeth of Mtsensk, 1936), on a play by Nikolai Leskov, which enjoyed great success outside his country, but was disliked by the Soviet authorities for its dissonant style. A revised version with the title Katerina Ismailova was premiered in Moscow in 1963.

Sergey Prokofiev, a pupil of Rimsky-Korsakov, combined traditional music with some experimental features. He composed his first opera, Maddalena (1911) at the age of twenty. During a tour of the United States, the Chicago Opera commissioned him an opera, The Love of the Three Oranges (The Love of the Three Oranges, 1919), based on a text by Carlo Gozzi, a comic work of surrealist tone. He lived a few years in Paris, time in which he made Ógnenny angel (The Angel of Fire, 1923). After returning to his country in 1933, he tackled Vojna i Mir (War and Peace, 1946), by Lev Tolstoy, which was not well received by the Soviet authorities, who branded him as unpatriotic. To congratulate himself with them he composed Póvest or nastoyáschem cheloveke (The Story of a Real Man, 1948), more adept to the regime.

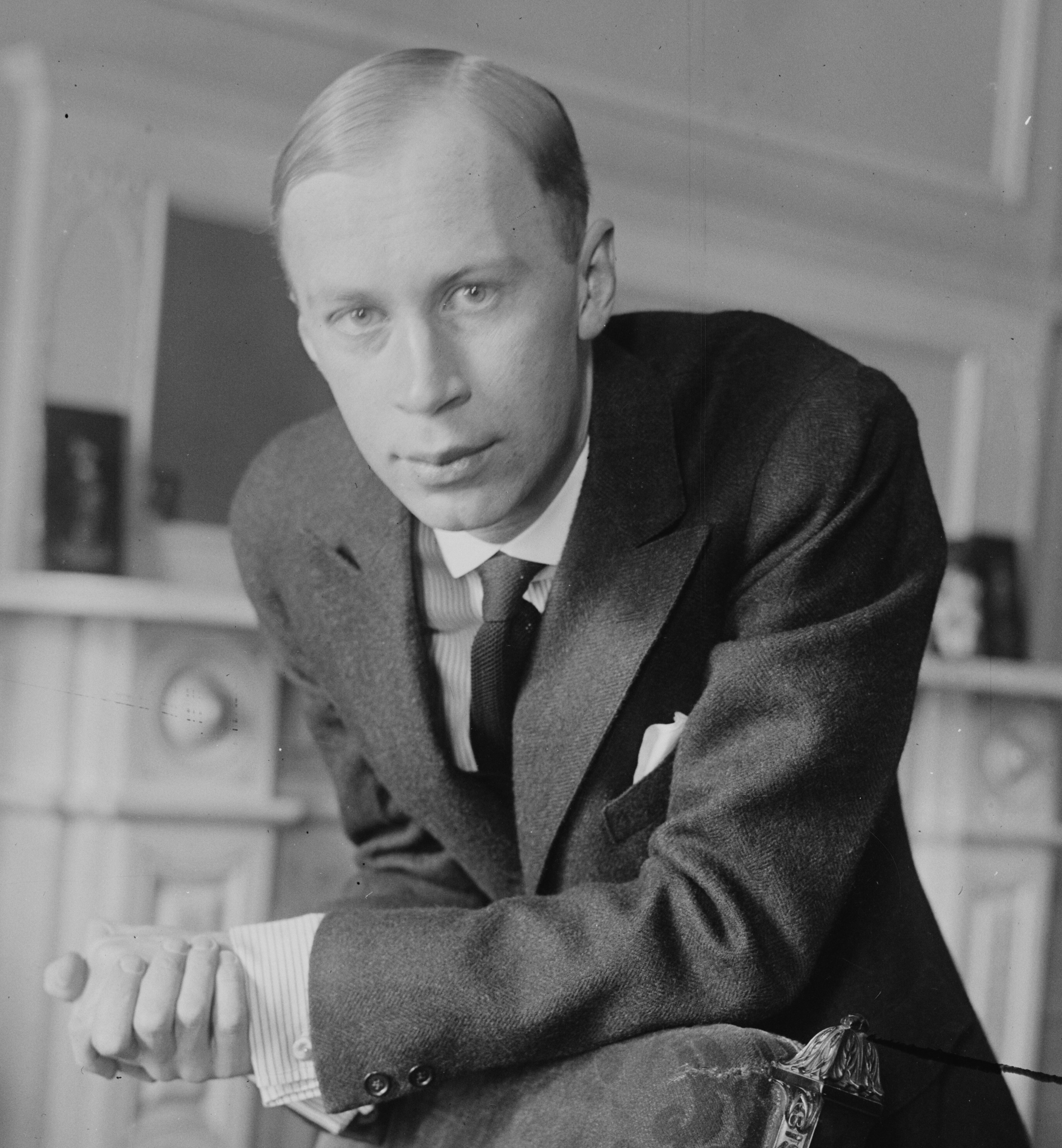
Sergei Prokofiev

Sergey Rakhmaninov was influenced by Tchaikovsky. He devoted himself mainly to symphonic and piano music, but tackled opera in works such as Aleko (1893), Skupój rýtsar (The Miserly Gentleman, 1906) and Francesca da Rimini (1907).

The Swedish-born British Gustav Theodor Holst premiered in 1916 Savitri, a chamber opera based on the Indian Mahābhārata, in which he employed bitonality. He subsequently composed The Perfect Fool (1923), At the Boar's Head (1925) and The Tale of the Wandering Scholar (1934).

Ralph Vaughan Williams was the author in 1924 of a ballad opera, Hugh the Drover (Hugh the Drover). In 1929 he premiered Sir John in Love, about the Shakespearian character of Falstaff. After the operetta The Poisoned Kiss (The Poisoned Kiss), he composed Riders to the Sea (Riders to the Sea), of veristic and Wagnerian affiliation. His last work was The Pilgrim's Progress (The Pilgrim's Progress, 1951).

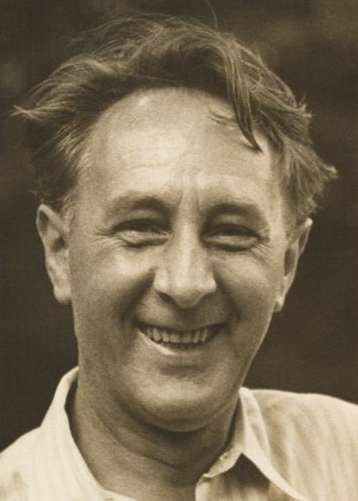
Bohuslav Martinů

The German Carl Orff was the author of the operas Der Mond (The Moon, 1939), Die Kluge (The Cunning One, 1943), Antigonae (1949) and Oedipus der Tyrann (Oedipus the King, 1959). His cantata Carmina Burana (1937), based on medieval goliardic poems, although not an opera, is often performed in opera houses.

In Italy, Gian Francesco Malipiero developed a style which, despite its modernity, denoted the weight of Italian musical tradition, especially Monteverdi and Vivaldi. He was the author of L'Orfeide (1925), Giulio Cesare (1936), I caprici di Callot (1942), Il figliuol prodigo (1953) and Il capitan Spavento (1963). Ildebrando Pizzetti also combined modernity and tradition, influenced by Renaissance and Baroque music. After several youthful works, in 1915 he premiered Fedra, based on a play by Gabriele D'Annunzio. It was followed by operas such as Debora e Jaele (1922), Fra Gherardo (1928) and Lo straniero (1930). In his following works he gave predominance to the arioso: Orseolo (1935), Vanna Lupa (1950) and Cagliostro (1953). One of his greatest successes was Assassino nella cattedrale (1958), on a play by T. S. Eliot. Ferruccio Busoni, based in Germany, evolved from a post-Romantic influenced by Schumann, Brahms and Mendelssohn to a young classicism – in his words – that gradually assumed contemporary novelties. He was the author of Die Brautwahl (The Bride's Choice, 1912), Arlecchino (1917), Turandot (1917) and Doktor Faust (1925); the latter, incomplete, was completed by his disciple Philipp Jarnach. Licinio Refice, who was a priest, made operas on religious themes: Santa Cecilia (1934) and Margherita da Cortona (1938).

The Czech Bohuslav Martinů was an eclectic musician who brought together neoclassicism with a certain neo-baroque tendency, impressionism and American popular music (jazz and gospel). Settled in Paris, he produced works such as Le Soldat et la danseuse (The Soldier and the Dancer, 1927), Les Trois Souhaits (The Three Wishes, 1929) and Hry or Marii (The Miracles of Mary, 1934). He later composed two operas for radio: Veselohra na mostě (Comedy on the Bridge, 1935) and Julietta (1937). His last works were Ariane (1958) and Řecké pašije (The Greek Passion, 1959).

Other exponents were: Werner Egk (Die Zaubergeige [The Magic Fiddle], 1935; Irische Legende [Irish Legend], 1954; Der Revisor [The Revisor], 1957), Dmitri Kabalevsky (Breugnon Tails, 1938), Albert Roussel (Padmâvatî, 1923), Othmar Schoeck (Penthesilea, 1927), Heinrich Sutermeister (Die schwarze Spinne [The Black Spider], 1936; Romeo und Julia, 1940; Die Zauberinsel [The Magic Island], 1942; Raskolnikoff, 1948) and Rudolf Wagner-Régeny (Der Günstling, 1935; Die Bürger von Calais [The Burghers of Calais], 1939).

=== Post World War II: tradition and avant-garde ===
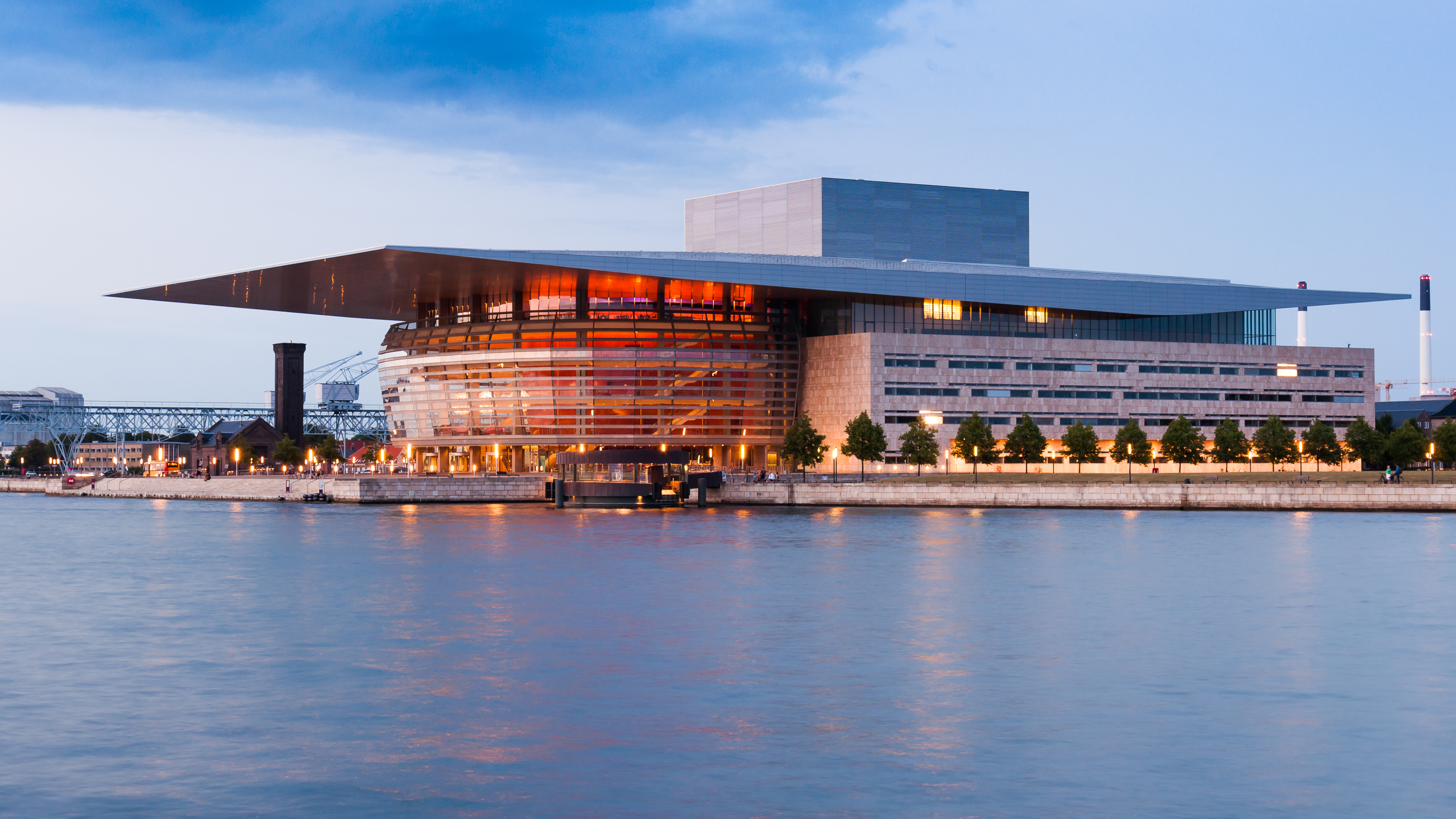
Copenhagen Opera House, opened in 2005

After World War II, opera continued with its split, perhaps more accentuated, between the neoclassical tradition and the musical avant-gardes inherited from impressionism, expressionism and atonalism, which gave new musical styles such as concrete music, integral serialism, aleatoric music, minimalism, etc. In general, the new musical languages have been misunderstood by the public, which has remained anchored in the traditional repertoire.

The immediate postwar period was a difficult period for opera, not only because of the destruction caused during the war, but also because of the pessimism and skepticism of the intellectual elites, who came to question the viability of the operatic genre, which they considered obsolete. In those early years, modest productions predominated, along with experimental forms such as the so-called "anti-opera", based on the deconstruction of the traditional resources of the genre. Other authors, such as John Cage, tried a type of scenic music without plot and, sometimes, even without text, in works such as Living Room Music (1940) or Water Walk (1959). György Ligeti created a type of phonetic theater based on noises and onomatopoeias (Nouvelles Aventures, 1966).

In the 1960s, opera was making a resurgence and composers embarked on more ambitious and larger-scale works. Alongside productions of a more traditional character, anti-opera with experimental and aleatoric elements, without any narrative character, followed; examples would be Dieter Schnebel's Glossolalie (1961), Henri Pousseur's Votre Faust (1969) and Mauricio Kagel's Staatstheater (1970). As a reaction, between the 1970s and 1980s the anti-anti-opera emerged, which recovered the narrative text and the traditional resources of opera, although with a contemporary language and a certain ironic and satirical component; some exponents would be: We Come to the River by Hans Werner Henze (1976), Le Grand Macabre by György Ligeti (1978), Jakob Lenz by Wolfgang Rihm (1979) and Un re in ascolto by Luciano Berio (1984).

==== United Kingdom ====
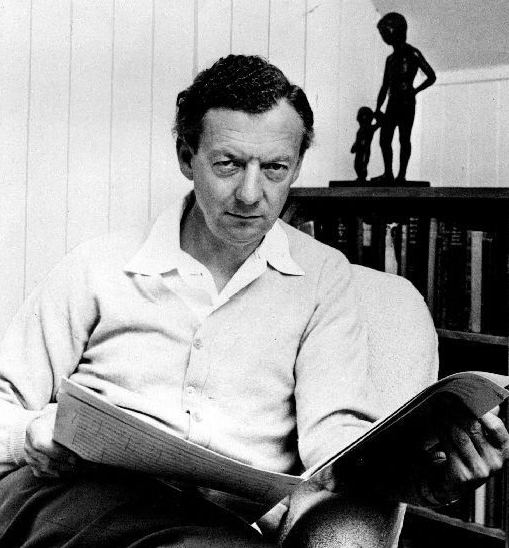
Benjamin Britten

In this period, one of the most prolific opera composers was Benjamin Britten. The most recurrent themes in his works were loneliness and pain, his major existential concerns, as deoned in his first work, Peter Grimes (1945). He then ventured into chamber opera, as in his works The Rape of Lucretia (1946) and Albert Herring (1947). For this he founded the English Opera Group orchestra and the Aldeburgh Festival (Sussex). In 1951, the Royal Opera proposed him to compose a second part of Peter Grimes, which resulted in Billy Budd, based on a text by Herman Melville. For the coronation of Elizabeth II he composed Gloriana (1953). He dealt with psychological drama with The Turn of the Screw (1954), based on a play by Henry James. In 1960 he drew on Shakespeare for A Midsummer Night's Dream. After some religiously inspired works, Owen Wingrave (1971) focused on pacifism, one of Britten's preoccupations, whose premiere was on television. His last work was Death in Venice (1973), on the novel by Thomas Mann. He was the partner of the tenor Peter Pears, with whom he collaborated in numerous works.

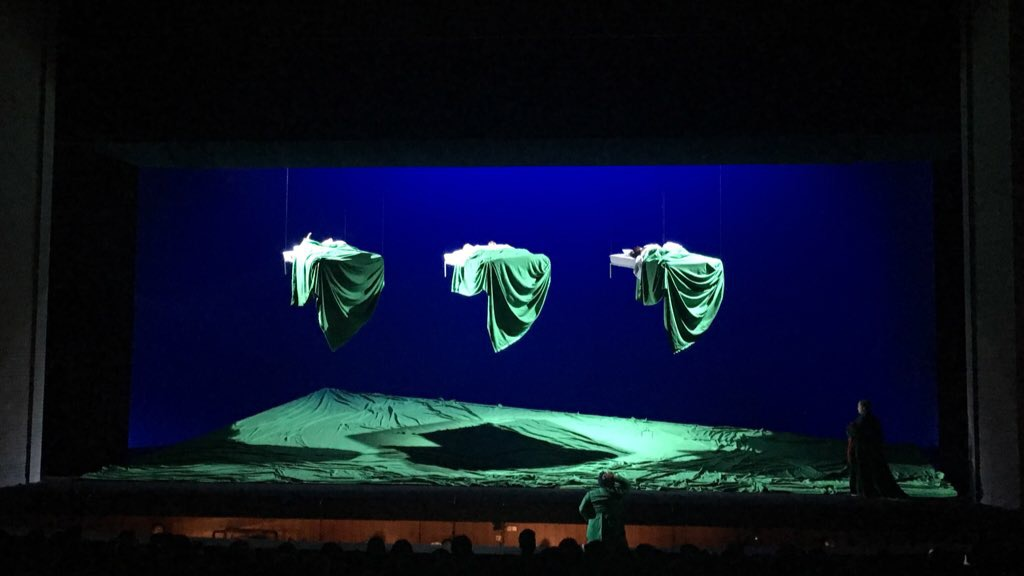
Performance of A Midsummer Night's Dream by Benjamin Britten, Peking Music Festival (2016)

William Walton was influenced by Stravinsky, Sibelius and jazz. In 1947 he was commissioned to write an opera for the reopening of the Royal Opera House in London and, after six years of work, he presented Troilus and Cressida, whose premiere in 1954 was not as successful as expected. In 1967 he premiered The Bear, a one-act comedy that parodied the vocal excesses of traditional opera.

Michael Tippett was inspired by Mozart's Die Zauberflöte for his first opera, The Midsummer Marriage (1955). His next projects were all different in theme and structure: King Priam (1962), The Knot Garden (1970), The Ice Break (1977) and New Year (1989). In the latter he introduced some elements of rap.

Harrison Birtwistle achieved great success with his first opera, Punch and Judy (1968), which was notable for its lack of direct narration, being a story told from several points of view. He repeated the same formula in The Mask of Orpheus (1984). Other works of his were Yan Tan Tethera (1986), Gawain (1991), The Second Mrs. Kong (1994) and The Last Supper (2000).

Mark-Anthony Turnage developed an innovative work, with great jazz influence and a taste for percussion. In Greek (1988) he required from the singers a vocal declamation that should sound as if it were not opera. In 1997 he adapted H. G. Wells's The Country of the Blind and, in 2002, a work by Sean O'Casey, The Silver Tassie.

Notable in minimalism was Michael Nyman, author of The Man who mistook his Wife for a Hat (The Man who mistook his Wife for a Hat, 1986) and Facing Goya (2000).

Other exponents were: Lennox Berkeley (Ruth, 1956; The Castaway, 1967), Arthur Bliss (The Olympians, 1949; Tobias and the Angel, 1960), Alan Bush (Wat Tyler, 1950; The Man of Blackmoor, 1955; The Sugar Reapers, 1964), Peter Maxwell Davies (Taverner, 1962; The Lighthouse, 1980), Thea Musgrave (Mary, Queen of Scots, 1977; A Christmas Carol, 1978) and John Tavener (St. Mary of Egypt, 1992). More recently, Thomas Adès (Powder Her Face, 1995; The Tempest, 2004), Judith Weir (A Night at the Chinese Opera, 1987) and George Benjamin (Written on Skin, 2012).

==== France and Italy ====
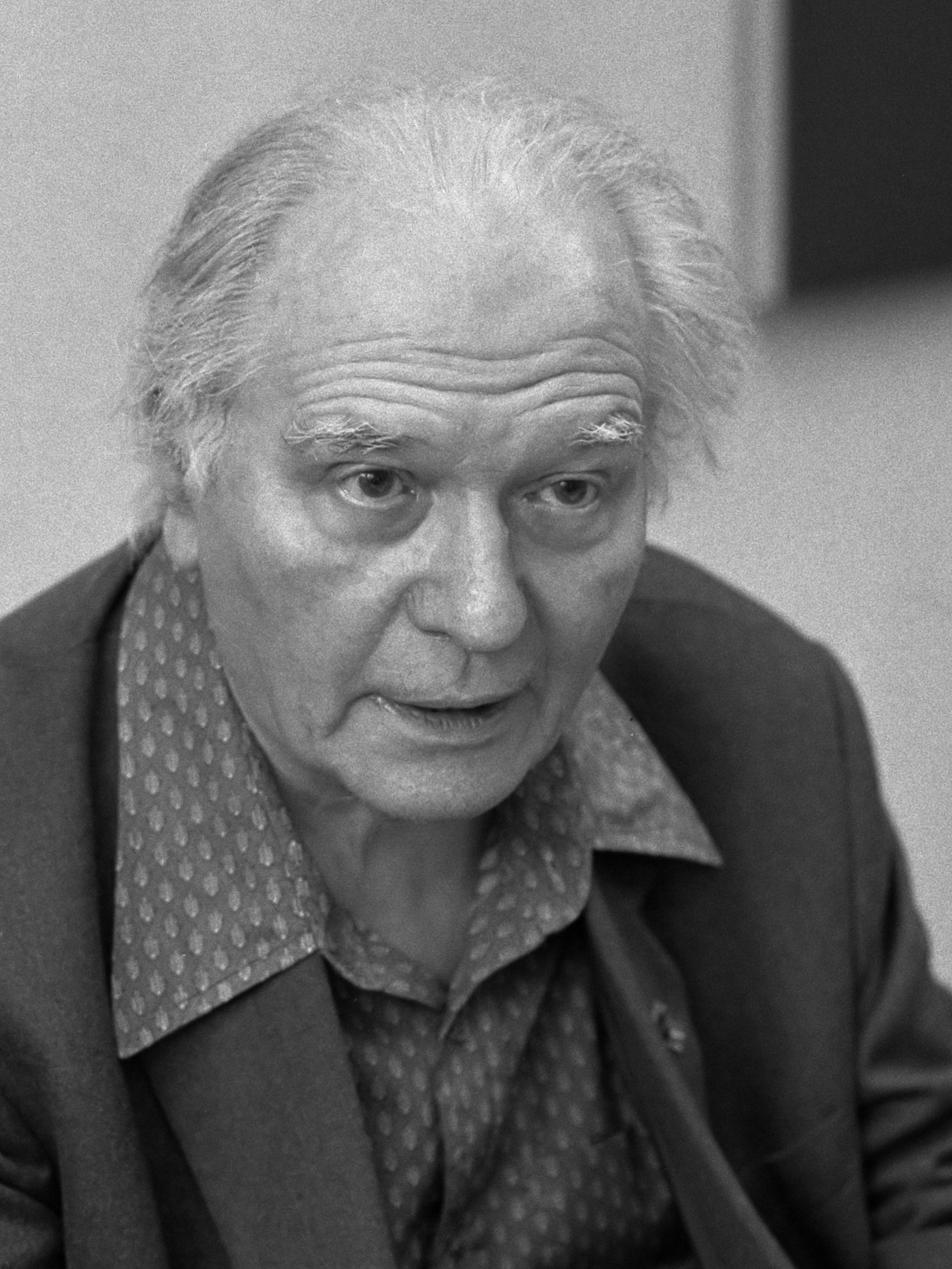
Olivier Messiaen

In France, one of the most outstanding musicians of the period was Olivier Messiaen. A student of Paul Dukas, he integrated in his style diverse influences, from classical to serialism and oriental music. He composed only one opera, Saint-François d'Assise (Saint-François d'Assise, 1983), a highly staged work, which included three Martenot waves.

Emmanuel Bondeville was director of the Opéra-Comique and the Paris Opera. He was the author of Madame Bovary (1951), based on the play by Gustave Flaubert, and Antoine et Cléopâtre (Antony and Cleopatra, 1974), based on Shakespeare.

Philippe Fénelon was a disciple of Messiaen, author of operas such as Le chevalier imaginaire (1992), Salammbô (1998) and Faust (2007).

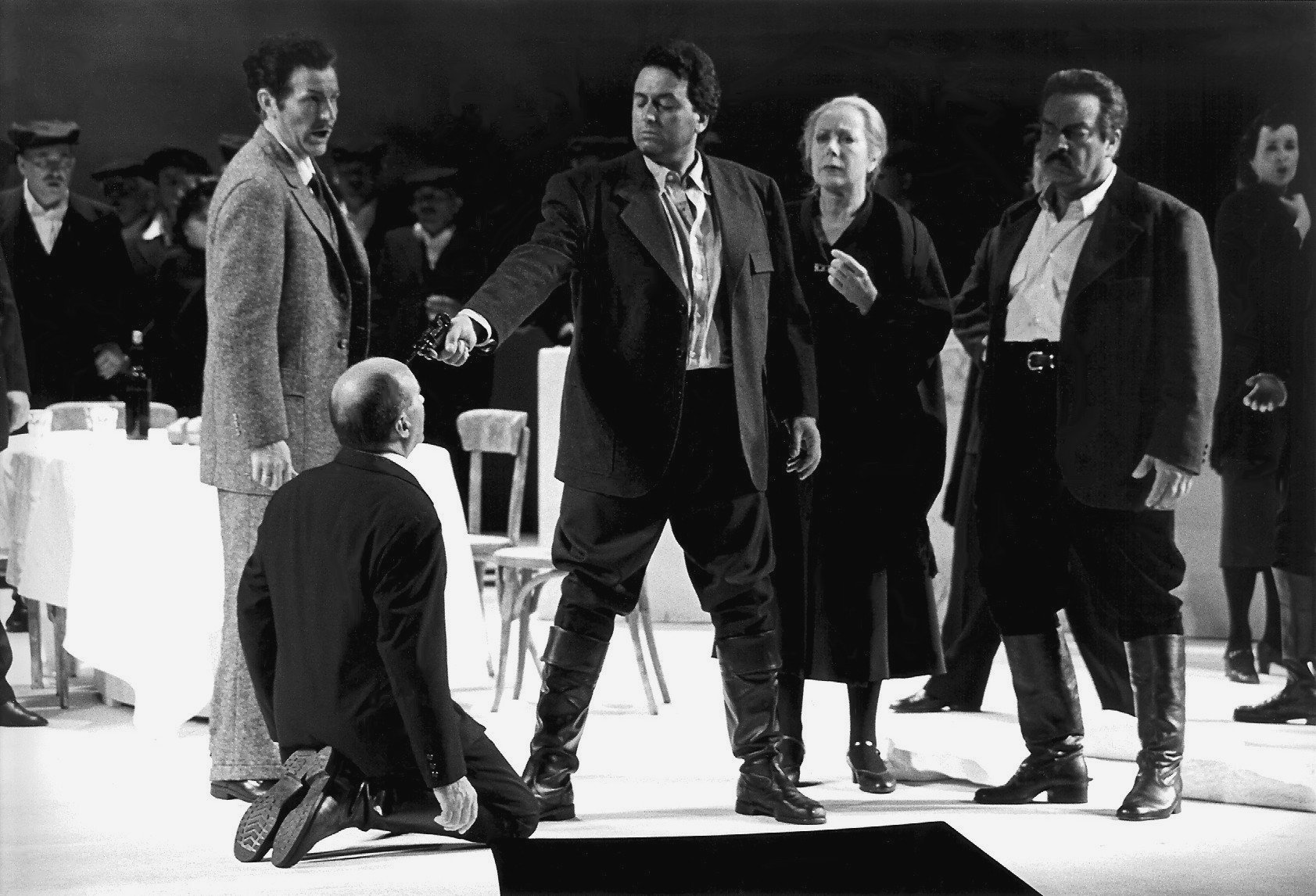
Representación de Salvatore Giuliano de Lorenzo Ferrero, Staatstheater Kassel (1996)

In Italy, Luigi Dallapiccola framed himself in serialism, with a strong influence of Schönberg, as is evident in his first opera, Volo di notte (Night Flight, 1940), based on a work by Antoine de Saint-Exupéry. In 1949 he premiered Il prigioniero, in which he used three rows of twelve tones that symbolically connected each element of the opera. It was followed by Job (1950) and Ulisse (1968), which were not as successful.

Luigi Nono started in serialism and then moved on to electronic music. He was the author of Intolleranza 1960 (1961), which was followed by Al gran sole carico d'amore (1975) and Prometeo. Tragedia dell'ascolto (1984).

Luciano Berio, a disciple of Dallapiccola, evolved from neoclassicism towards integral serialism. He composed some operas, such as Opera (Opera, 1970), La vera storia (The true story, 1982), Un re in ascolto (A king listens, 1984) – the last two with librettos by Italo Calvino – Outis (1996) and Cronaca del luogo (Chronicle of the place, 1999). He also composed a new finale for the opera Turandot by Giacomo Puccini, replacing Franco Alfano's, which he premiered in 2002.

Other exponents were: Franco Mannino (Vivì, 1957; Il diavolo in giardino, 1963; Il ritratto di Dorian Gray, 1982), Jacopo Napoli (Miseria e nobiltà, 1945; Massaniello, 1953), Goffredo Petrassi (Il cordovano, 1949; Morte dell'aria, 1960), Renzo Rossellini (La guerra, 1956; Il vortice, 1958; Uno sguardo dal ponte, 1961) and Nino Rota (Il cappello di paglia di Firenze, 1944). More recently, it is worth mentioning: Lorenzo Ferrero (Salvatore Giuliano, 1986; La Conquista, 2005; Risorgimento!, 2011) and Salvatore Sciarrino (Luci mie traditrici, 1998).

==== Germany and Austria ====
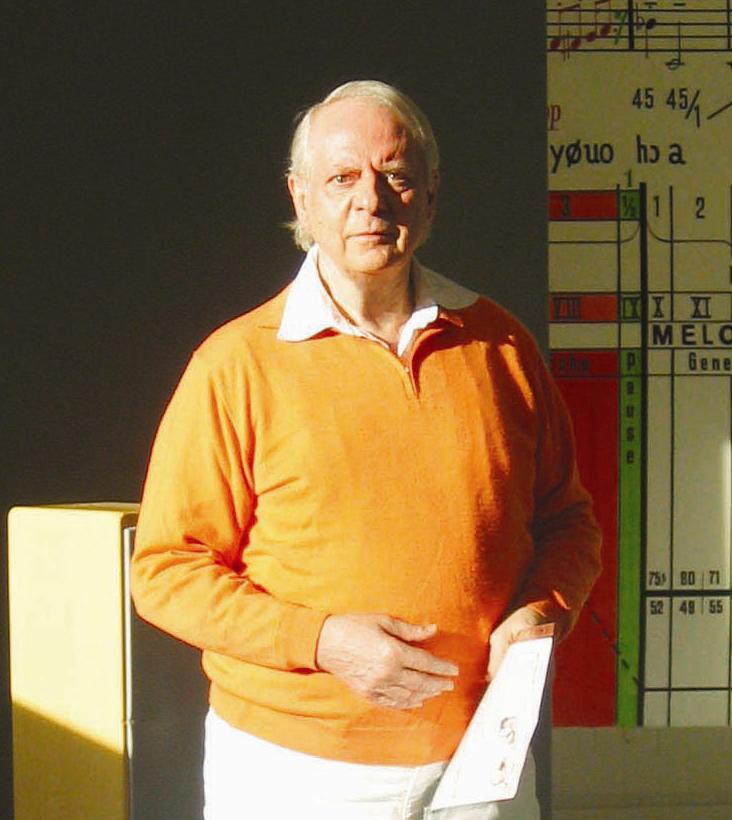
Karlheinz Stockhausen

In Germany, Karlheinz Stockhausen was one of the most prominent representatives of serialism and electronic music. He tackled one of the most complex operatic projects, Licht: Die Sieben Tage der Woche (Light: The Seven Days of the Week), a cycle of seven operas composed between 1977 and 2003. It was premiered in its entirety in 2011, although each part had already been premiered separately. Stockhausen's pretension was to realize a "cosmic theater" that would unite music and religion, in search of a transcendental vision of the human being.

Bernd Alois Zimmermann was an avant-garde musician who was influenced by Schönberg's dodecaphonism and composers such as Stravinsky, Honegger, Poulenc and Milhaud. In his work he brought together acoustic and electronic sounds, and used recording as an additional resource. He composed only one opera, Die Soldaten (The Soldiers, 1965), which was considered one of the best German operas of the second half of the century. It was an innovative work, featuring a five-level stage on which up to three scenes could be performed simultaneously.

Hans Werner Henze brought together in his work expressionism, serialism, dodecaphonism, neoclassicism and popular music such as jazz. After his first full-length opera, Boulevard Solitude (1952), he moved to Italy, where his style became more sensual and exuberant, in works such as König Hirsch (The Deer King, 1956), Der Prinz von Homburg (1960), Elegie für junge Liebende (Elegy for Young Lovers, 1961), Der junge Lord (The Young Lord, 1965) and Die Bassariden (The Bacchantes, 1962). His following works expressed his leftist political commitment: We Come to the River (1976), Die englische Katze (1983). In L'Upupa und der Triumph der Sohnesliebe (The Hoopoe and the Triumph of Filial Love, 2003) he also wrote the libretto.

Wolfgang Rihm was a pupil of Stockhausen, although he sought to move beyond experimental languages in search of greater expressiveness. Influenced by Antonin Artaud's theater of cruelty, he sought a greater communion between the musical performance and the audience, through a more textured orchestra, nuanced vocality and lyrical, dynamic music. He composed six operas: Faust und Yorick (1976), Jakob Lenz (1978), Die Hamletmaschine (1986), Oedipus (1987), Die Eroberung von Mexico (The Conquest of Mexico, 1992) and Séraphin (1994).

Wolfgang Fortner was the author of two operas based on works by Federico García Lorca: Bluthochzeit (Blood Wedding, 1958) and In seinem Garten lebt Don Perlimplín mit Belisa (Don Perlimplín con Belisa en su jardín, 1962). He also composed the opera buffa Corinna (1958) and Elisabeth Tudor (1972).

Other German composers were: Boris Blacher (Fürstin Tarakanowa, 1945; Die Flut [The Flood], 1947; Preußisches Märchen [Prussian Fairy Tale], 1949), Paul Dessau (Die Verurteilung des Lukullus [The Damnation of Lucullus], 1951; Puntila, 1966; Einstein, 1974), Giselher Klebe (Die Räuber [The Bandits], 1957; Figaro lässt sich scheiden [Figaro gets divorced], 1963), Helmut Lachenmann (Das Mädchen mit den Schwefelhölzern [The Matchgirl], 1996) and Aribert Reimann (Ein Traumspiel [Phantasmagoria], 1965; Lear, 1978; Bernarda Albas Haus [The House of Bernarda Alba], 2000).

In Austria, Gottfried von Einem was influenced by Stravinsky, Prokofiev and jazz. He made his debut with Dantons Tod (The Death of Danton, 1947), on a text by Georg Büchner, and Der Prozeß (The Trial, 1953), on the work of Franz Kafka. In 1971 he premiered Der Besuch der alten Dame (The Visit of the Old Lady), based on the play by Friedrich Dürrenmatt. His last opera was Kabale und Liebe (1976), based on the play by Friedrich Schiller that Verdi used for Luisa Miller.

==== United States ====
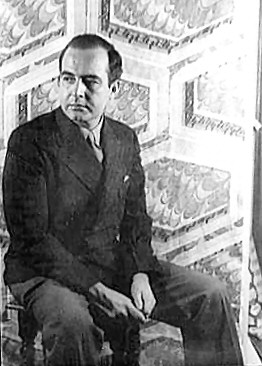
Samuel Barber

In the United States, Samuel Barber excelled as a melodist, with a conservative style sometimes described as post-romantic. He collaborated on occasions with Gian Carlo Menotti, who wrote the libretto for his first and most famous opera, Vanessa (1957), based on a play by Isak Dinesen, for which he won a Pulitzer Prize. More grandiloquent was Antony and Cleopatra (1966), commissioned for the Metropolitan Opera. For his part, the Italian-American Menotti was a precocious talent, having already written two operas by the age of thirteen. Influenced by Italian verismo, his work is notable for its melodramatism: Amelia Goes to the Ball (Amelia Goes to the Ball, 1937), The Medium (The Medium, 1946), The Telephone (1947), The Consul (1950), Amahl and the Night Visitors (Amahl and the Night Visitors, 1951), The Saint of Bleecker Street (1954).

Leonard Bernstein was a composer and conductor, author of numerous musicals and film scores. His first opera was Trouble in Tahiti (1951), which mixed the traditional operatic genre with pop music. In 1956 he premiered his comic operetta Candide, which he was not very satisfied with and tinkered with for thirty years.

Carlisle Floyd composed two operas during his student period: Slow Dusk (1949) and The Fugitives (1951). With Susannah (1955), which combined a certain post-romanticism with elements of American folklore—especially Quaker hymns—he obtained a great success and excellent reviews. His next works were not as successful: Wuthering Heights (Wuthering Heights, 1958), based on the work of Emily Brontë; and Of Mice and Men (Of Mice and Men, 1969), based on a text by John Steinbeck.

John Adams was described as a minimalist, although in his music one finds neo-Romantic echoes and elements of popular music, such as jazz, ragtime, swing, pop and rock. His first opera was Nixon in China (1987), followed by The Death of Klinghoffer (1991), the operas-oratorios El Niño (2000) and The Gospel According to the Other Mary (2012) and other stage works.

Philip Glass was one of the most prominent representatives of minimalism, a style that, as opposed to the dense structures used at the time in Europe, sought to elaborate music with few elements, using for example repetitive patterns in different speed, duration and volume, in staggered or superimposed alterations. He was also influenced by Eastern—especially Indian—and North African music. In 1967 he formed the Philip Glass Ensemble. His first opera, Einstein on the Beach (Einstein on the Beach, 1976), catapulted him to fame. It was then followed by Satyagraha (1980) and Akhnaten (1984). After his opera The Voyage (1992) he made a trilogy based on films by Jean Cocteau: Orphée (1993), La Belle et la Bête (1994) and Les enfants terribles (1996). In 1998 he released a digital opera in 3-D, Monsters of Grace. Another exponent of minimalism was Steve Reich (Three Tales, 2002).

Mention should also be made of: Mark Adamo (Little Women [Little Women], 1998; Lysistrata, 2005), George Antheil (Volpone, 1953; The Brothers, 1954; The Wish, 1955), Marc Blitzstein (Regina, 1949; Idiots First, 1963), William Bolcom (Casino Paradise, 1990; A View from the Bridge, 1999) and Aaron Copland (The Tender Land, 1954).

==== Spain and Latin America ====
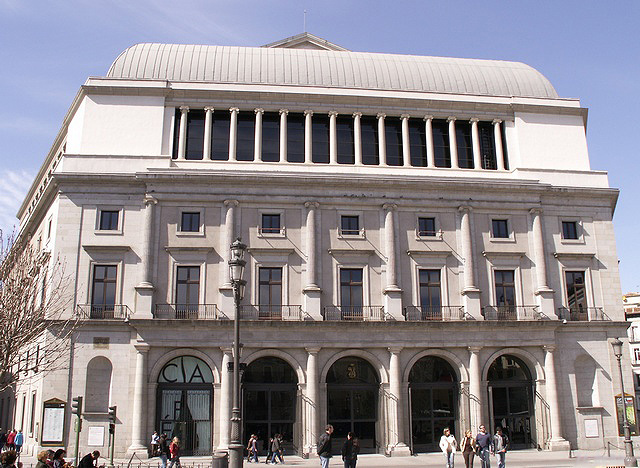
Teatro Real (Madrid)

Spain entered modernity in the second half of the century, after leaving behind musical nationalism and the virtual disappearance of zarzuela. Xavier Montsalvatge stood out for his skillful use of instrumentation, with a certain influence of Olivier Messiaen. He was the author of El gato con botas (1947) and Una voce in off (1961). Roberto Gerhard was a student of Schönberg and the first Spanish composer to use dodecaphonism. He was also influenced by Falla. He was the author of the opera The Duenna (1951). Luis de Pablo, self-taught, departed from serialism towards aleatoric music, while practicing electronic music. He was the author of the operas Kiú (1982), El viajero indiscreto (1988) and La madre invita a comer (1992). Cristóbal Halffter developed his work starting from serialism and dodecaphonism. He was the author of the operas Don Quixote (2000) and Lazaro (2007). Mention should also be made of: Salvador Bacarisse (El tesoro de Boabdil, 1958), Xavier Benguerel (Llibre vermell, 1988), José María Cano (Moon, 1998), Francisco Escudero (Gernika, 1987), Josep Mestres Quadreny (El Ganxo, 1959; Cap de Mirar, 1991), Joaquín Nin-Culmell (La Celestina, 1965), Matilde Salvador (Vinatea, 1974), Tomás Marco (Selene, 1974), Amando Blanquer (El triomf de Tirant, 1992), Carles Santos (Asdrúbila, 1992; Ricardo y Elena, 2000) and Joan Guinjoan (Gaudí, 2004).

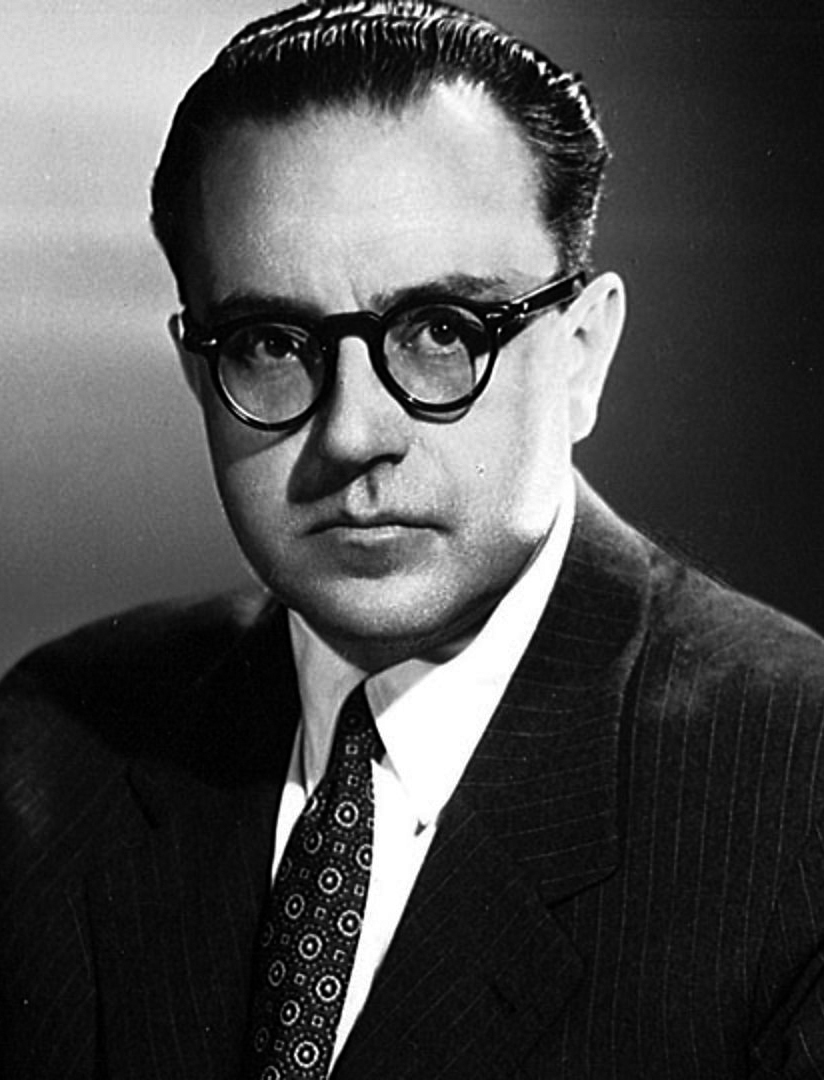
Alberto Ginastera

Latin America entered into full modernity at this time. In Argentina, Alberto Ginastera composed in a neo-expressionist style heir to serialism, as denoted in his operas Don Rodrigo (1964), Bomarzo (1967) and Beatrix Cenci (1971). Bomarzo was banned in Argentina for its scenes of sex and violence. Mauricio Kagel moved between neoclassicism and aleatoric music, with an eclectic, anti-conventional style, in which a sense of humor and irony stand out. In Sur Scène (1962), considered an anti-opera, he made a rupturist exercise with a deconstruction of traditional opera. He repeated with Staatstheater (1970), an experimental opera without libretto or plot, with recorded orchestral music, a ballet without dance and a choir of sixty voices singing solo. In Aus Deutschland (1981) he presented Schubert and Goethe singing a black spiritual. Other Argentine authors were: Juan José Castro (La zapatera prodigiosa, 1943; Bodas de sangre, 1953) and Astor Piazzolla (María de Buenos Aires, 1968, opera-tango). Already in the 21st century it is worth mentioning Osvaldo Golijov (Ainadamar, 2003).

In Brazil, Heitor Villa-Lobos, self-taught, studied the musical forms of the native tribes of his country, which influenced his music. During a stay in Paris he assimilated the novelties of the musical avant-garde, especially those of Erik Satie and Darius Milhaud. He was the author of Magdalena (1948), Yerma (1955) and A Menina das Nuvens (The Girl of the Clouds, 1957).

In Chile it is worth mentioning Juan Orrego-Salas, author of El retablo del rey pobre (1952). Ecuador's exponent was Luis Humberto Salgado (Cumandá, 1940; El centurión, 1959–1961; Eunice, 1956–1962). In Mexico, it is worth mentioning Carlos Chávez (Pánfilo y Laurita, later renamed The visitors, 1957).

==== Other countries ====
Astana Opera House (Kazakhstan), opened in 2013

In the Soviet Union (Russia since 1991), music enjoyed state protectionism, although under the stylistic and argumentative guidelines imposed by the regime, generally linked to a certain post-Romantic nationalism. Tikhon Khrennikov excelled as a symphonic musician and was the author of several operas, including Frol Skobeiev (1950) and Mat (The Mother, 1957), based on a novel by Maksim Gorky. Fikret Amirov composed ballets, symphonic and concert music and some operas, most notably Syevil (1953), which he recomposed three times until he premiered the definitive version in 1980. Other exponents were: Vissarion Shebalin (Ukroshcheniye stroptivoy [The Taming of the Shrew], 1957; Solntse nad stepyu [The Sun Above the Steppe], 1958) and Rodion Shchedrin (Oratoriya Lenina [Lenin Oratorio], 1972; Lolita, 1992).

In Hungary, György Ligeti developed an eclectic oeuvre in which each of his compositions was independent of the rest, although a certain neodadaist tendency was discernible. He composed only one opera, Le Grand Macabre (1976), with a somewhat chaotic score that included fragments alluding to other composers, as well as various heterodox sounds, both guttural and from instruments such as horns and whistles.

In Finland, Aulis Sallinen moved in a traditional tonal language, with a great sense of rapport between music and theater. His first opera, Ratsumies (The Rider, 1975), was a great success, so the Finnish National Opera commissioned another work, Punainen viiva (The Red Line, 1978). The next commission was from the BBC and the Royal Opera House in London, Kunningas lähtee Ranskaan (The King Marches to France, 1983). Other works of his were Kullervo (1988), Palatsi (The Palace, 1995, chamber opera) and King Lear (2000). Einojuhani Rautavaara was mostly devoted to symphonic music, but made a foray into opera with Apollo v. Marsyas (1973), after which he conceived a trilogy in which he elaborated text and music: Sammon Ryosto (The Myth of Sampo, 1982), Thomas (1986) and Vincent (1990). More recently noted composer Kaija Saariaho (L'amour de loin [Love from afar], 2000; Only the Sounds Remains [Only the Sounds Remain], 2015).

Polish Krzysztof Penderecki was a violin virtuoso as well as a composer, with an avant-garde style heir to atonalism. He composed four operas, of difficult vocal interpretation due to the orchestral density—with glissandos and vibratos—and the guttural sounds integrated in his compositions: The Devils of Loudun (1969), Paradise Lost (1978), Die Schwarze Maske (1986) and Ubu Rex (1991).

Slovak Eugen Suchoň showed some influence of Leoš Janáček, in operas such as Krútňava (The Whirlpool, 1949) and Svätopluk (1960).

In Sweden, worth mentioning in these years are: Karl-Birger Blomdahl (Aniara, 1959) and Hilding Rosenberg (Hus med dubbel ingäng [House with Two Doors], 1970).

In Belgium, Philippe Boesmans denoted the influence of Henri Pousseur, as seen in Reigen (1993) and Wintermärchen (Winter's Tale, 1999).

In Israel, Marc Lavry composed the first opera in Hebrew: Dan ha-shomer (Dan the guard, 1945). Subsequent works include Menachem Avidom (Aleksandrah, 1961).

John Haddock was the author of the first Australiana opera: Madelin Lee (2004).

The US-based Chinese Tan Dun was noted for his music for film and events such as the 2008 Beijing Olympics, and was the author of several operas: Marco Polo (1996), Tea: A Mirror of Soul (2002) and The First Emperor (2006).

In Thailand, the composer Somtow Papinian Sucharitkul, grand-nephew of King Rama VI, was the promoter of the establishment of opera in the country and author of the first national operas: Madana (1999), Mae Naak (2001), Ayodhya (2006).

=== Singers of the 20th century ===
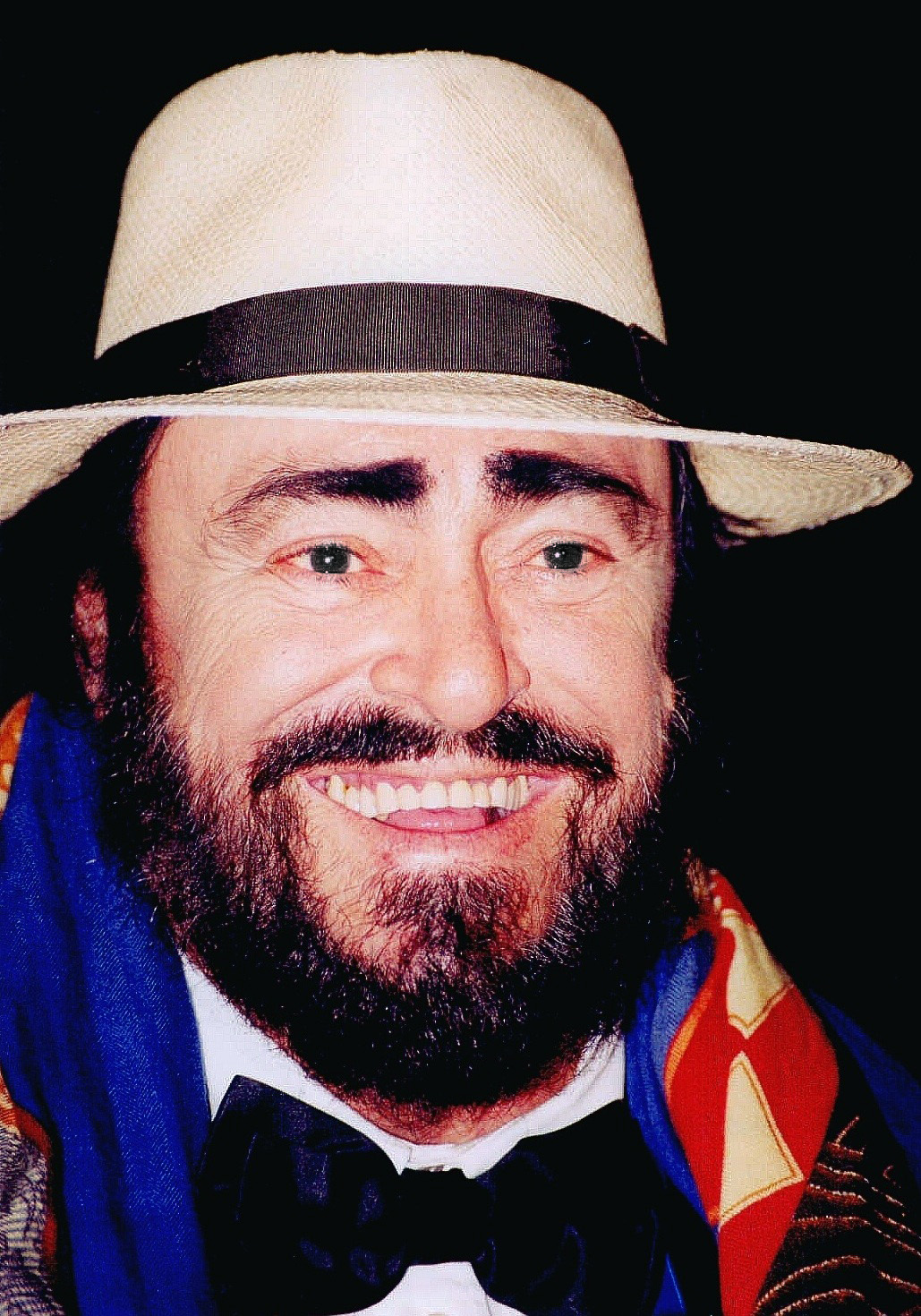
Luciano Pavarotti, one of the most outstanding tenors of the 20th century

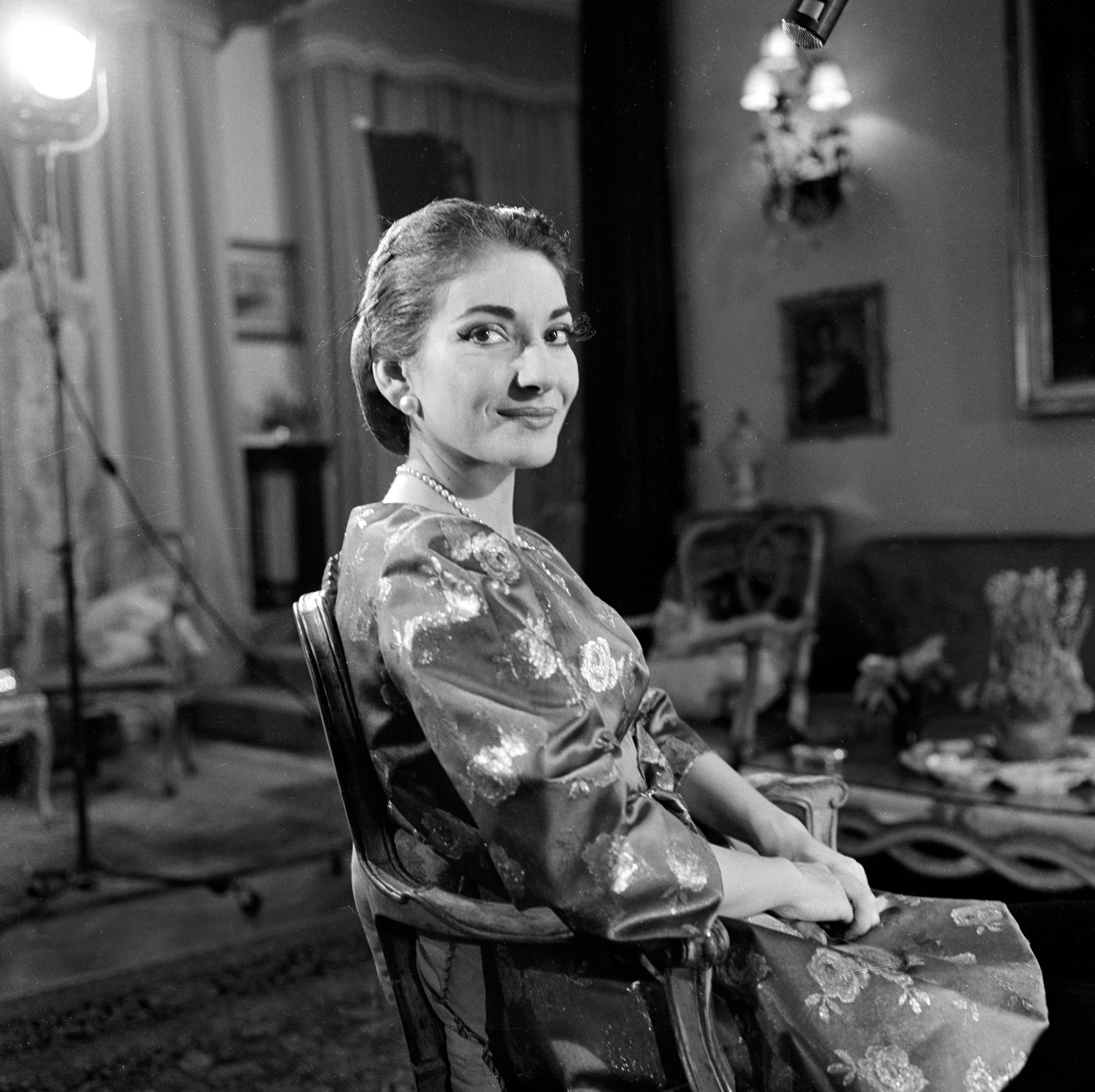
Maria Callas, one of the most outstanding sopranos of the 20th century

Among the most outstanding opera singers of the 20th century it is worth mentioning:

- Victoria de los Ángeles, Spanish soprano of great stage presence;
- Janet Baker, English mezzo-soprano interpreter of traditional works and numerous works by Britten and Walton;
- Cecilia Bartoli, Italian mezzo-soprano specialist in Handel, Mozart and Rossini;
- Teresa Berganza, Spanish mezzo-soprano described by Herbert von Karajan as the "best mezzo-soprano in the world";
- Carlo Bergonzi, Italian tenor nicknamed the "tenor of tenors", ideal in Verdian roles;
- Jussi Björling, Swedish lyric tenor who excelled in the Italian repertoire;
- Montserrat Caballé, Spanish soprano of international renown, interpreter of bel canto and minor genres such as zarzuela;
- Maria Callas, Greek soprano, one of the most famous divas of all times, who combined dramatic intensity and technical precision;
- Piero Cappuccilli, Italian baritone interpreter of Verdi;
- José Carreras, Spanish tenor, formed the group Los Tres Tenores with Domingo and Pavarotti;
- Boris Christoff, Bulgarian bass considered the best in the role of Boris Godunov, as well as in operas by Verdi;
- Plácido Domingo, Spanish tenor with a wide variety of roles, the one who has recorded the most records in history;
- Dietrich Fischer-Dieskau, German baritone and conductor, much in demand in operatic recitals;
- Kirsten Flagstad, Norwegian soprano who performed several Wagnerian roles;
- Juan Diego Flórez, Peruvian light tenor specialist in Rossini and Donizetti;
- Nicolai Gedda, Swedish tenor who mastered several languages, which allowed him a great variety of roles;
- Beniamino Gigli, Italian tenor who succeeded Caruso at the Metropolitan in New York, with a sweet and light voice;
- Tito Gobbi, Italian baritone of great stage presence;
- Elisabeth Grümmer, German soprano of pure voice and wide register;
- Marilyn Horne, American mezzo-soprano who performed Händel and bel canto works;
- Hans Hotter, German bass-baritone of the Wagnerian repertoire;
- Maria Jeritza, Czech soprano who triumphed in the interwar period;
- Alfredo Kraus, Spanish light lyric tenor, mainly Italian and French repertoire;
- Lotte Lehmann, German soprano interpreter of Wagner and Strauss;
- Christa Ludwig, German mezzo-soprano, one of Karajan's favorites;
- Giovanni Martinelli, Italian tenor of elevated tessitura, performed at the Metropolitan for thirty-three years;
- Lauritz Melchior, Danish tenor, the most famous heldentenor Wagnerian of the century;
- Birgit Nilsson, Swedish soprano with a wide and powerful voice, ideal for Wagnerian registers;
- Jessye Norman, American soprano with a wide repertoire;
- Luciano Pavarotti, Italian tenor of great vocal gifts, one of the most famous and charismatic of recent times;
- Ezio Pinza, Italian bass who performed several seasons at the Metropolitan, as well as in musicals and films;
- Rosa Ponselle, American soprano with a deep, soaring voice;
- Leontyne Price, American soprano who excelled in Verdian roles;
- Friedrich Schorr, Hungarian bass-baritone with a Wagnerian register;
- Ernestine Schumann-Heink, Austrian contralto with a wide register;
- Elisabeth Schwarzkopf, German soprano who excelled in Mozart roles;
- Léopold Simoneau, Canadian tenor specializing in Mozart; Mariano Stabile, Italian baritone who excelled in the role of Falstaff, which he performed 1200 times;
- Giuseppe Di Stefano, Italian tenor who formed an artistic couple with Maria Callas;
- Conchita Supervía, Spanish mezzo-soprano who excelled in Rossini roles;
- Joan Sutherland, Australian soprano capable of great vocal prowess, for which she excelled in bel canto;
- Renata Tebaldi, Italian soprano, one of the stars of the Metropolitan Opera along with Maria Callas, with whom she rivaled;
- Bryn Terfel, Welsh baritone with a repertoire ranging from Mozart to Wagner;
- Jon Vickers, Canadian heroic tenor who excelled in both acting and singing;
- Leonard Warren, American dramatic baritone, the only one in his time to reach the high C;
- and Fritz Wunderlich, German lyric tenor with a powerful voice.

== See also ==
- Classical music
- Development of musical theatre
- History of music
- History of theatre
- Opera and Drama
- List of opera directors
- List of opera festivals
- List of prominent operas
- Chronological list of operatic sopranos

== Bibliography ==
- Abad Carlés, Ana (2015). Historia del ballet y de la danza moderna (in Spanish). Madrid: Alianza Editorial. ISBN 978-84-206-6575-7.
- Alier, Roger (2007). Diccionario de la ópera (I) de la A a la K (in Spanish). Barcelona: Robinbook.
- —— (2007). Diccionario de la ópera (II) de la L a la Z (in Spanish). Barcelona: Robinbook. ISBN 978-84-96924-14-7.
- —— (2011). Historia de la ópera (in Spanish). Barcelona: Robinbook. ISBN 978-84-95601-66-7.
- —— (1983). Historia del Gran Teatro del Liceo (in Spanish). Barcelona: La Vanguardia.
- Azcárate Ristori, José María de; Pérez Sánchez, Alfonso Emilio; Ramírez Domínguez, Juan Antonio (1983). Historia del Arte (in Spanish). Madrid: Anaya. ISBN 84-207-1408-9.
- Atlas ilustrado de la ópera (in Spanish). Madrid: Susaeta. 2011. ISBN 978-84-677-1630-6.
- Comellas, José Luis (2010). Historia sencilla de la Música (in Spanish). Madrid: Rialp. ISBN 978-84-321-3694-8.
- Diccionario de Música (in Spanish). Barcelona: RBA Larousse. 2003. ISBN 84-8332-394-X.
- Diccionario Enciclopédico Larousse (in Spanish). Barcelona: Planeta. 1990. ISBN 84-320-6070-4.
- Enciclopèdia de Barcelona 3. Gràcia / Petritxol (in Catalan). Barcelona: Gran Enciclopèdia Catalana. 2006. ISBN 84-412-1397-6.
- Enciclopedia de la Literatura Garzanti (in Spanish). Madrid: Ediciones B. 1991. ISBN 84-406-1992-8.
- Enciclopedia Salvat (in Spanish). Barcelona: Salvat. 1997. ISBN 84-345-9707-1.
- Enciclopedia temática Argos. Bellas Artes II (in Spanish). Barcelona: Argos Vergara. 1986. ISBN 84-7017-442-8.
- Historia de la cultura occidental (in Spanish). Barcelona: Labor. 1966.
- Ketterer, Robert (10 March 2010). "Opera and the uses of the classical tradition: Four studies". International Journal of the Classical Tradition. 17 (1): 60–86. doi:10.1007/s12138-010-0165-8. ISSN 1073-0508. JSTOR 25691292.
- Menéndez Torrellas, Gabriel (2013). Historia de la ópera (in Spanish). Akal. ISBN 978-84-460-3186-4.
- Oliva, César; Torres Monreal, Francisco (2005). Historia básica del arte escénico (in Spanish). Madrid: Cátedra. ISBN 84-376-0916-X.
- Souriau, Étienne (1998). Diccionario Akal de Estética (in Spanish). Madrid: Akal. ISBN 84-460-0832-7.
