= Costumbrismo =

Art movement

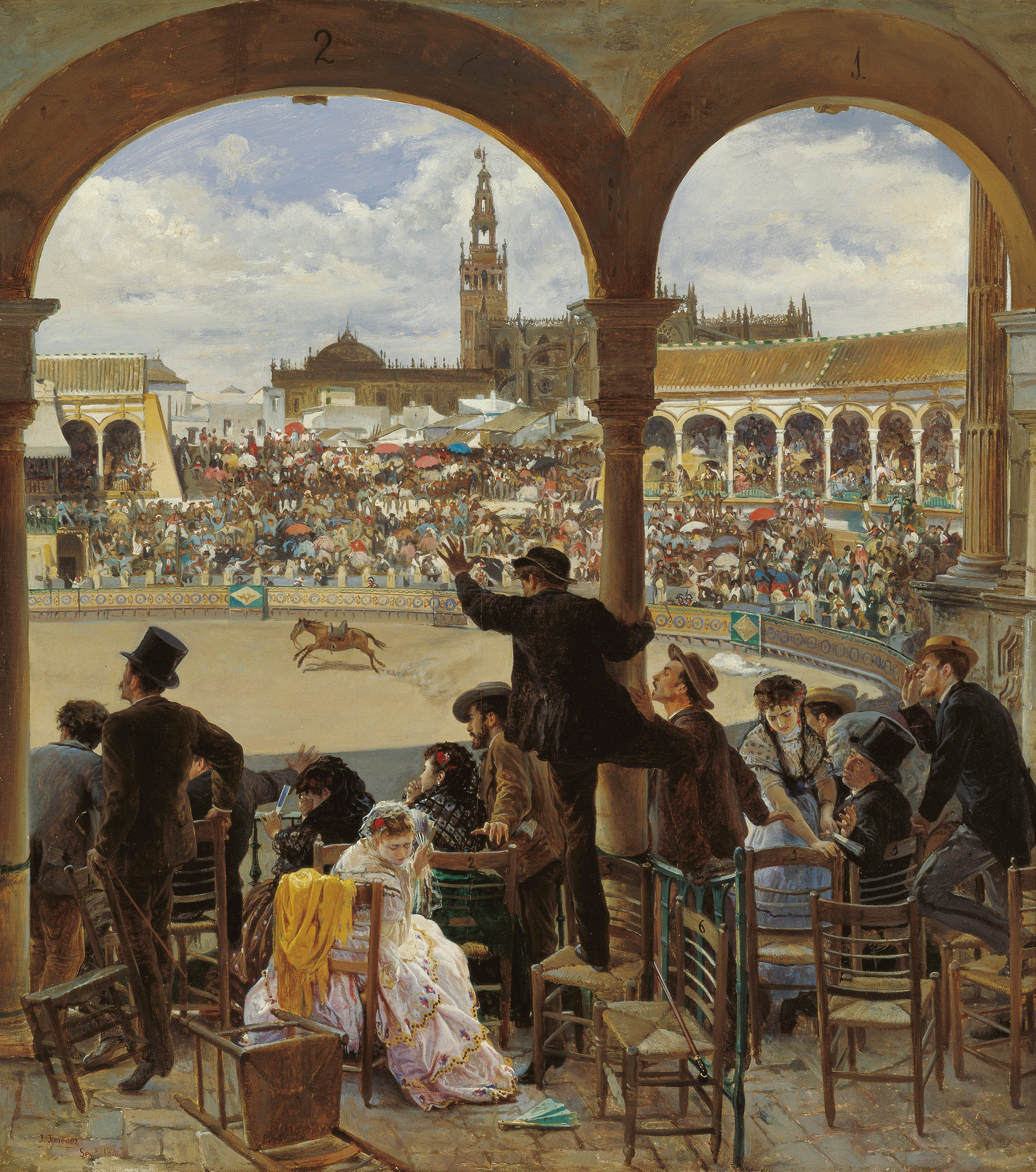
José Jiménez Aranda (1837–1903): The Bullring (1870)

Costumbrismo (in Catalan: costumisme; sometimes anglicized as costumbrism, with the adjectival form costumbrist) is the literary or pictorial interpretation of local everyday life, mannerisms, and customs, primarily in the Hispanic scene, and particularly in the 19th century, i.e. a localized branch of genre painting. Costumbrismo is related both to artistic realism and to Romanticism, sharing the Romantic interest in expression as against simple representation and the romantic and realist focus on precise representation of particular times and places, rather than of humanity in the abstract. It is often satiric and even moralizing, but unlike mainstream realism does not usually offer or even imply any particular analysis of the society it depicts. When not satiric, its approach to quaint folkloric detail often has a romanticizing aspect.

Costumbrismo can be found in any of the visual or literary arts; by extension, the term can also be applied to certain approaches to collecting folkloric objects, as well. Originally found in short essays and later in novels, costumbrismo is often found in the zarzuelas of the 19th century, especially in the género chico. Costumbrista museums deal with folklore and local art and costumbrista festivals celebrate local customs and artisans and their work.

Although initially associated with Spain in the late 18th and 19th century, costumbrismo expanded to the Americas and set roots in the Spanish-speaking portions of the Americas, incorporating indigenous elements. Juan López Morillas summed up the appeal of costumbrismo for writing about Latin American society as follows: the costumbristas' "preoccupation with minute detail, local color, the picturesque, and their concern with matters of style is frequently no more than a subterfuge. Astonished by the contradictions observed around them, incapable of clearly understanding the tumult of the modern world, these writers sought refuge in the particular, the trivial or the ephemeral."

== Literary costumbrismo in Spain ==
=== Origins ===
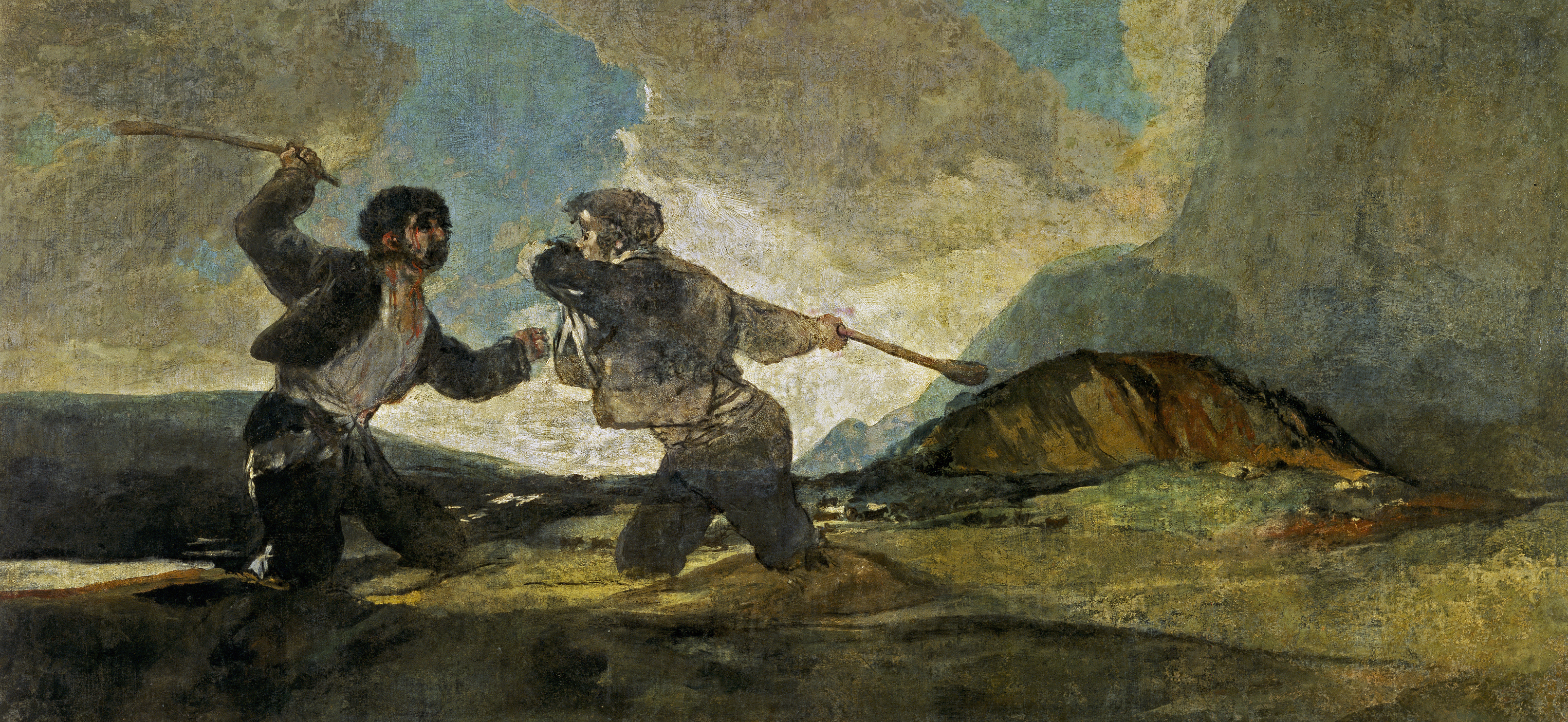
Some of the work of Goya can be seen as prefiguring costumbrismo, especially as practiced in Madrid. Here, the Fight with Cudgels, one of Goya's Black Paintings.

Antecedents to costumbrismo can be found as early as the 17th century (for example in the work of playwright Juan de Zabaleta) and the current becomes clearer in the 18th century (Diego de Torres Villarroel, José Clavijo y Fajardo, José Cadalso, Ramón de la Cruz, Juan Ignacio González del Castillo). All of these writers have, in at least some of their work, an attention to specific, local detail, an exaltation of the "typical" that would feed into both costumbrismo and Romanticism. In the 19th century costumbrismo bursts out as a clear genre in its own right, addressing a broad audience: stories and illustrations often made their first or most important appearance in cheap periodicals for the general public. It is not easy to draw lines around the genre: Evaristo Correa Calderón spoke of its "extraordinary elasticity and variety". Some of it is almost reportorial and documentary, some simply folkloric; what it has in common is the effort to capture a particular place (whether rural or urban) at a particular time.

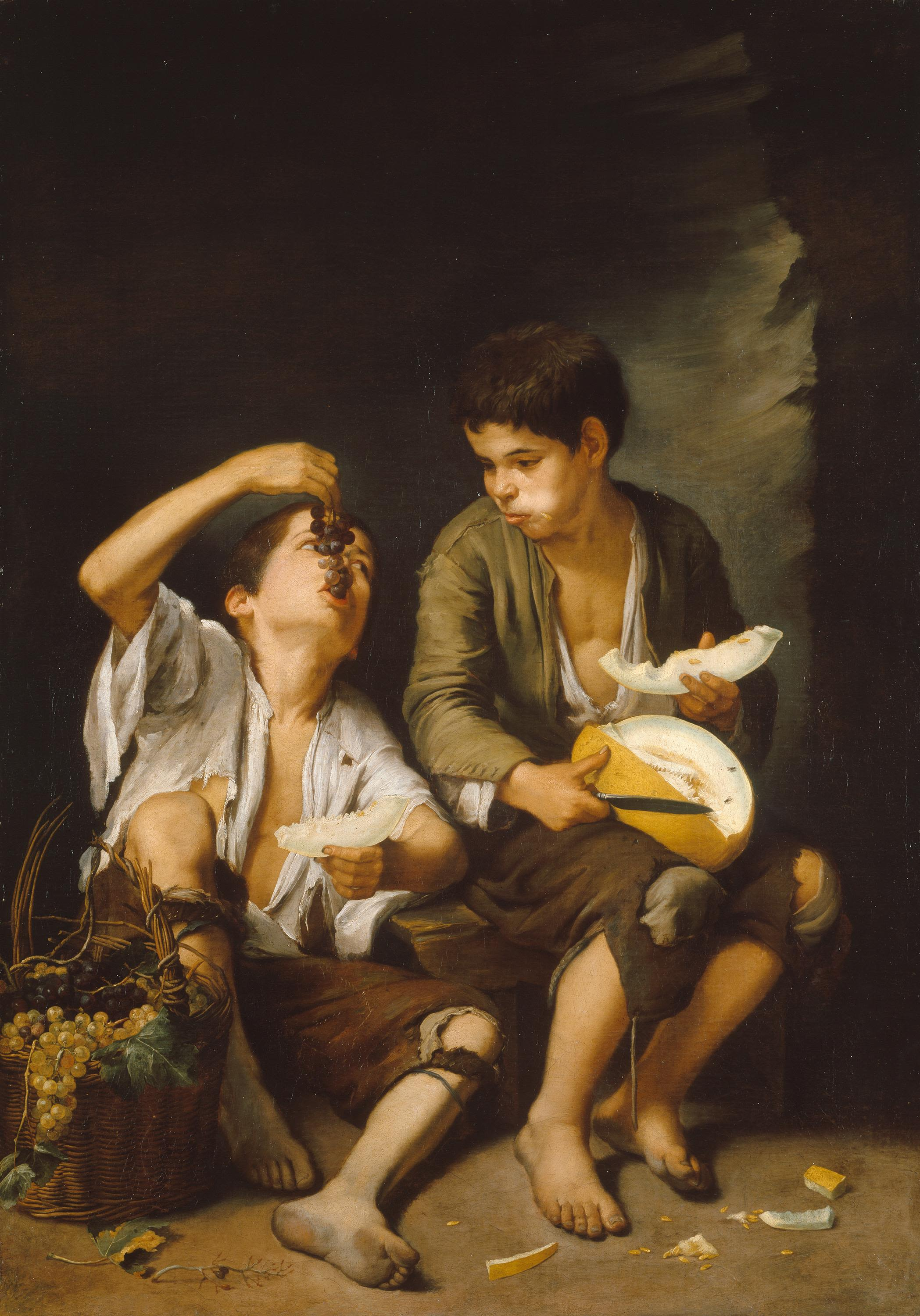
Much as Goya influenced costumbrismo in Madrid, Murillo influenced costumbrismo in Seville.

Sebastián de Miñano y Bedoya (1779–1845) is considered by some a costumbrista, although arguably his writing is too political to properly fit the genre. According to Andrés Soria, the first incontestable costumbristas are the anonymous and pseudonymous contributors to La Minerva (1817), El Censor (1820–23) and El Correo Literario y Mercantil (1828–33). Later come the major figures of literary costumbrismo: Serafín Estébanez Calderón (1799–1867), Ramón de Mesonero Romanos (1803–82), and Mariano José de Larra (1809–37) who sometimes wrote under the pseudonym "Fígaro". Estébanez Calderón (who originally wrote for the abovementioned Correo Literario y Mercantil) looked for a "genuine" and picturesque Spain in the recent past of particular regions; Mesonero Romanos (whose work began appearing anonymously in periodicals as early as 1822) was a careful observer of the Madrid of his time, especially of the middle classes; Larra, according to José Ramón Lomba Pedraja, arguably transcended his genre, using the form of costumbrismo for political and psychological ideas. An afrancesado—a liberal child of the Enlightenment—he was not particularly enamored of the Spanish society that he nonetheless observed minutely.

Costumbrismo was by no means without foreign influences. The work of Joseph Addison and Richard Steele nearly a century earlier in The Spectator had influenced French writers, who in turn influenced the costumbristas. Furthermore, Addison and Steele's own work was translated into Spanish in the early 19th century, and Mesonero Romanos, at least, had read it in French. Still, an even stronger influence came by way of Victor-Joseph Étienne de Jouy (whose work appeared in translation in La Minerva and El Censor), Louis-Sébastien Mercier (especially for Le Tableau de Paris, 1781–88), Charles Joseph Colnet Du Ravel, and Georges Touchard-Lafosse. In addition, there were the travelogues such as Richard Ford's A Handbook for Travellers in Spain, written by various foreigners who had visited Spain and, in painting, the foreign artists (especially, David Roberts) who had settled for a time especially in Seville and Granada and drew or painted local subjects.

While Estébanez Calderón, Mesonero Romanos, and (insofar as he fits the genre) Larra were the major costumbrista writers, many other Spanish writers of the 19th century devoted all or part of their careers to costumbrismo. Antonio María Segovia (1808–74), who mainly wrote pseudonymously as "El Estudiante" and who founded the satiric-literary magazine El Cócora; his collaborator Santos López Pelegrín (1801–46), "Abenámar"; many early contributors to Madrid's Semanario Pintoresco Español (1836-57), Spain's first illustrated magazine; and such lesser lights as Antonio Neira de Mosquera (1818–53), "El Doctor Malatesta" (Las ferias de Madrid, 1845); Clemente Díaz, with whom costumbrismo took a turn toward the rural; Vicente de la Fuente (1817–89), portraying the lives of bookish students (in between writing serious histories); José Giménez Serrano, portraying a romantic Andalusia; Enrique Gil y Carrasco, a Carlist from Villafranca del Bierzo, friend of Alexander von Humboldt, and contributor to the Semanario Pintoresco Español; and many other regionalists around Spain.

=== The Spanish Drawn By Themselves ===
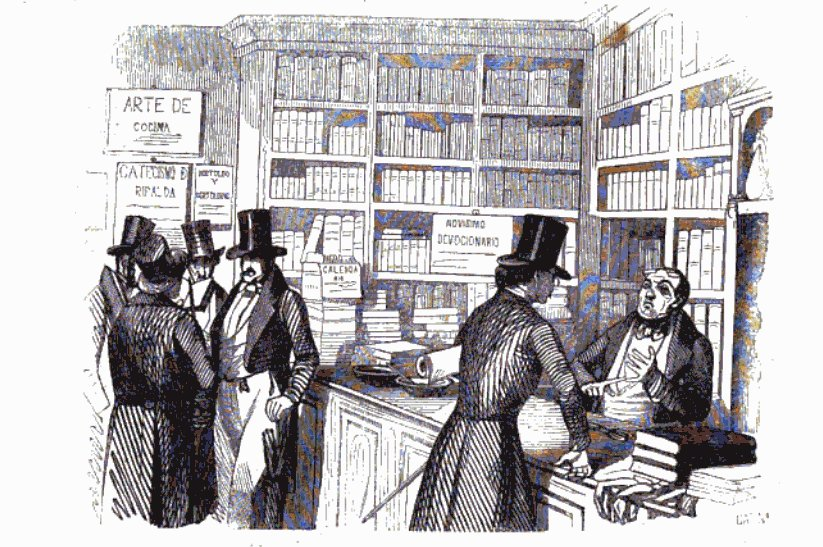
An unsigned illustration from Los españoles pintados por sí mismos: a book shop in Madrid.

Much as literary costumbrismo had been influenced by English models, often by way of France, the same occurred with the equivalent in the visual arts, but with far more recent models. In a period when physiognomy was in vogue, Heads of the People or Portraits of the English was serialized in London starting in 1838 and was published in its entirety in 1840–41. It combined essays by such "distinguished writers" (the volume's own choice of words) as William Makepeace Thackeray and Leigh Hunt with pictures of individuals emblematic of different English "types". This was followed in France by a work first serialized as Les Français, Moeurs Contemporaines ("The French, Contemporary Manners", beginning in 1839) and published in a volume in 1842 as Les Français peints par eux-mêmes. Encyclopédie Morale du dixneuviéme siécle ("The French, drawn by themselves. Moral Encyclopedia of the 19th Century"). The Spanish soon followed with Los españoles pintados por sí mismos ("The Spanish Drawn By Themselves") serialized from 1842 and published in a volume in 1843.

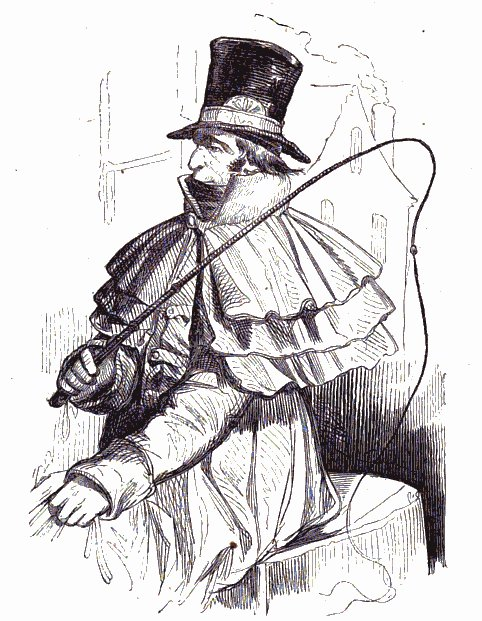
"El Coche Simón", unsigned illustration from Los españoles…

A collective and hence, necessarily, uneven anthology of "types", Los españoles… was a mixture of verse and prose, and of writers and artists from various generations. Illustrators included Leonardo Alenza (1807–45), Fernando Miranda y Casellas, Francisco Lameyer (1825–1877), Vicente Urrabieta y Ortiz, and Calixto Ortega. The writers included Mesonero and Estébanez as well as various less costumbrista writers and many not usually associated with the genre, such as Gabriel García Tassara (1817–75) or the conservative politician Francisco Navarro Villoslada (1818–95). Andrés Soria remarks that, except for the Andalusian "types", everything was from the point of view of Madrid. Unlike later costumbrismo, the focus remained firmly on the present day. In some ways, the omissions are as interesting as the inclusions: no direct representation of the aristocracy, of prominent businessmen, of the high clergy, or of the army, and except for the "popular" classes, the writing is a bit circumspect and cautious. Still, the material is strong on ethnological, folkloric, and linguistic detail.

In an epilogue to Los españoles…, "Contrastes. Tipos perdidos, 1825, Tipos hallados, 1845" ("Contrasts. Types lost, 1825, types found, 1845"), Mesonero on the one hand showed that the genre, in its original terms, was played out, and on the other laid the ground for future costumbrismo: new "types" would always arise, and many places remained to be written about in this fashion. The book had many descendants, and a major reissue in 1871. A particularly strong current came out of Barcelona: for example, José M. de Freixas's Enciclopedia de tipos vulgares y costumbres de Barcelona ("Encyclopedia of vulgar types and customs of Barcelona", 1844) illustrated by Servat, and El libro Verde de Barcelona ("The Green Book of Barcelona", 1848) by "José y Juan" (José de Majarrés and Juan Cortada y Sala. The very title of Los valencianos pintados por sí mismos (Valencia 1859) gave a nod of the hat to the earlier work,

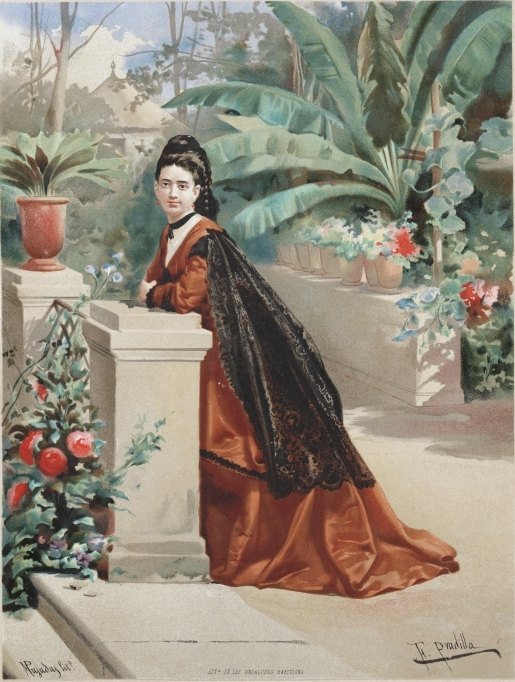
A woman from Montevideo, Uruguay, depicted by Francisco Pradilla y Ortiz in Las mujeres españolas, portuguesas y americanas…

A revival of collective works of costumbrismo in the time of the First Spanish Republic saw the reissue of Los españoles… (1872), as well as the publication of Los españoles de hogaño ("The Spanish these days", 1872), focused on Madrid, and the vast undertaking Las mujeres españolas, portuguesas y americanas… ("Spanish, Portuguese, and American Women…", published in Madrid, Havana, and Buenos Aires in 1872–1873 and 1876). Also from this time was the satiric Madrid por dentro y por fuera ("Madrid from inside and outside, 1873) by Manuel del Palacio (1831–1906).

Carlos Frontaura carried on costumbrismo in Madrid with Las tiendas ("Shops", 1886) and "Tipos madrileños" ("Madrid types", 1888). Ramón de Navarrete (1822–1897) writing variously as or "Asmodeo" (after Asmodeus, king of the demons), broke with the history of the genre by writing of the upper classes in Madrid during the Restoration, as in his Sueños y realidades ("Dreams and realities, 1878). Enrique Sepúlveda wrote about both Madrid and Barcelona, Narcís Oller (1846–1930) about Barcelona, and Sabino de Goicoechea (1826–1901), known as "Argos", about the Basque Country. Galicia was represented by the collective work El álbum de Galicia. Tipos, costumbres y leyendas ("The album of Galicia. Types, customs and legends", 1897).

=== Yesterday, Today, and Tomorrow ===
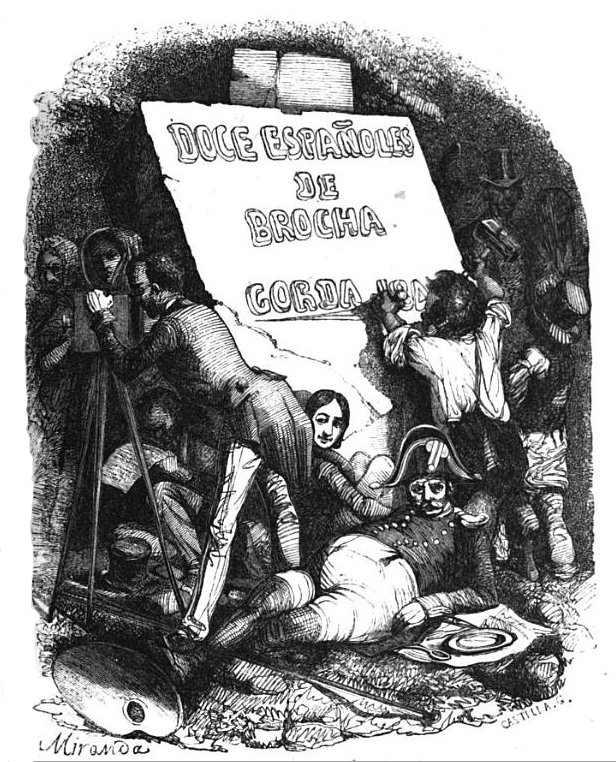
Title page of Doce españoles de brocha gorda..., drawn by Fernando Miranda y Casellas

Poet, journalist and pamphleteer Antonio Flores Algovia (1821–65), one of the contributors to Los españoles... followed up in 1846 with Doce españoles de brocha gorda, que no pudiéndose pintar a sí mismos, me han encargado a mí, Antonio Flores, sus retratos ("Twelve Spaniards with a broad brush, who not being able to portray themselves have put me, Antonio Flores, in charge of their portraits"), subtitled a "novel of popular customs" ("novela de costumbres populares"). Published in 1846 and reissued several times, the book merged the hitherto more essayistic costumbrista form with aspects of the novel (although not a particularly tightly plotted novel). Somewhat more novelistic was his Fe, Esperanza y Caridad ("Faith Hope and Charity"), published serially in La Nación in 1850–1851 and also much reprinted. Flores had been Eugène Sue's translator into Spanish, and Sue's influence is strong in this work. Flores turned to again to custumbrismo, of a sort, in 1853 with Ayer, hoy y mañana o la fe, el vapor y la electricidad (cuadros sociales de 1800, 1850 y 1899) ("Yesterday, today and tomorrow or faith, steam and electricity (social pictures of 1800, 1850, and 1899)") going Mesonero's "types lost" and "types found" one better by projecting a vision of the future influenced by the work of Émile Souvestre. His newspaper El Laberinto continued publishing his costumbrista work even posthumously, such as Tipos y costumbres españolas (1877).

Eugenio de Ochoa (1815–72) carried costumbrismo in a different direction. Born in the Basque country and moving often between Spain and France, his 1860 book Museo de las familias. París, Londres y Madrid ("Museum of families. Paris, London, Madrid") created a sort of cosmopolitan costumbrismo.

=== Costumbrismo by major Spanish realists ===
Many of the great Spanish realist writers of the 19th century worked at times in the costumbrista mode, especially at the start of their careers. Fernán Caballero (pen name of Cecilia Francisca Josefa Böhl de Faber) (1796–1877), for example, in the prose portions of her Cuentos y poesías populares andaluzas ("Popular Andalusian stories and poems", collected in 1859 from prior publication in magazines), writes within the genre, particularly in "Una paz hecha sin preliminares, sin conferencias y sin notas diplomáticas" ("A peace made without preliminaries, without conferences, and without diplomatic notes"), with its very specific setting in Chiclana de la Frontera. Pedro Antonio de Alarcón (1833–1891) issued a collection Cosas que fueron, bringing together 16 costumbrista articles.

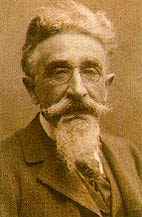
José María de Pereda

Andrés Soria sees José María de Pereda (1833–1906) as the most successful fusion of costumbrista scenes into proper novels, especially his portrayals of La Montaña, the mountainous regions of Cantabria. His Escenas montañesas (1864) is particularly in the costumbrista mode, with its mixture of urban, rural and seafaring scenes, and sections offering sketches of various milieus. Poet and novelist Antonio de Trueba (1819 or 1821–89) wrote squarely within the genre with Madrid por fuera and De flor en flor. Gustavo Adolfo Bécquer (1836–1870) portrayed Madrid, Seville, and Toledo. José María Gabriel y Galán (1870–1905), best known as a poet, also wrote costumbrista pieces about Salamanca. Armando Palacio Valdés (1853–1938) also essayed the genre in newspaper articles, collected in Aguas fuertes ("Strong waters", 1884). The writer and diplomat Ángel Ganivet (1865–98), seen by some as a precursor to the Generation of '98, wrote costumbrista scenes of Granada.

Elements of costumbrismo, or even entire works in the genre, can be found among major Spanish writers of the 20th century, though to a lesser extent. Miguel de Unamuno (1864–1936) worked in the genre for De mi país ("Of my country", 1903) and some stories such as "Solitaña" in of El espejo de la muerte ("The Mirror of Death", 1913), as did Pío Baroja with Vitrina pintoresca ("Picturesque showcase", 1935) and in passages of his novels set in the Basque Country. Azorín (José Augusto Trinidad Martínez Ruíz, 1873–1967) often wrote in this genre; one could comb the works of Ramón Gómez de la Serna (1888–1963) and Camilo José Cela (1916–2002) and find many passages that could come straight from a work of costumbrismo. Although taken as a whole these writers are clearly not costumbristas, they use the costumbrista style to evoke surviving remnants of Spain's past.

=== 20th century literary costumbrismo in Spain ===
The tradition of costumbrismo in Spain by no means ended at the turn of the century, but it simply did not play as important a role in 20th-century Spanish literature as it did in the century before. As noted above, several of the most important 20th-century Spanish writers at least dabbled in, or were influenced by, the genre. When we go beyond the first string of writers, we see more of a continuation of costumbrismo.

In the course of the century, more and more Spanish regions asserted their particularity, allowing this now established technique of writing to be given new scope. In other regions—Madrid, Andalusia—costumbrismo itself had become part of the region's identity. The magazine España, founded 1915, wrote about some new "types": the indolent golfo; the lower class señorito chulo with his airs and exaggerated fashions; the albañil or construction worker, but with far less sympathy than costumbristas in the previous century had portrayed their predecessors. Other "types" were those who were a caricature of times past: el erudito, with his vast but pointless book-learning, or El poeta de juegos florales ("the poet of floral games").

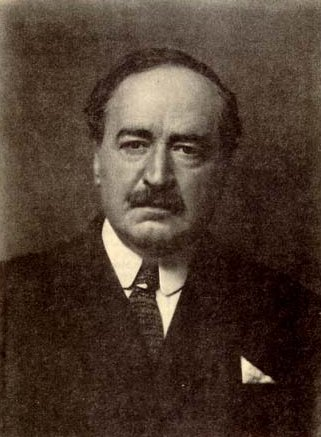
Vicente Blasco Ibáñez

Andrés Soria describes 20th century regional costumbrismo as more serious, less picturesque, and more poetic than in the 19th century. Among his many examples of the 20th century continuation of costumbrismo are Santiago Rusiñol (1861–1931), writing in Catalan about Catalonia and Mallorca; numerous chroniclers of the Basque Country: José María Salaverría (1873–1940), Ricardo Baroja (1871–1953), Dionisio de Azkue ("Dunixi"), José María Iribarren (1906–1971), and, as mentioned above, Pío Baroja; Vicente Blasco Ibáñez (1867–1928) writing about Valencia; and Vicente Medina Tomás (1866–1937), writing about Murcia.

A strong current of costumbrismo continued in 20th-century Madrid, including in poetry (Antonio Casero, 1874–1936) and theatre (José López Silva, 1860–1925; Carlos Arniches Barreda, 1866–1943). Other writers who continued the tradition were Eusebio Blasco (1844–1903), Pedro de Répide (1882–1947), Emiliano Ramírez Ángel (1883–1928), Luis Bello (1872–1935), and Federico Carlos Sainz de Robles (1899–1983). Similarly, 20th century Andalusia saw work by José Nogales (1860?–1908), Salvador Rueda (1857–1933), Arturo Reyes (1864–1913), José Mas y Laglera (1885–1940), Ángel Cruz Rueda (1888–1961), and Antonio Alcalá Venceslada (1883–1955).

== Costumbrismo in the visual arts in Spain ==
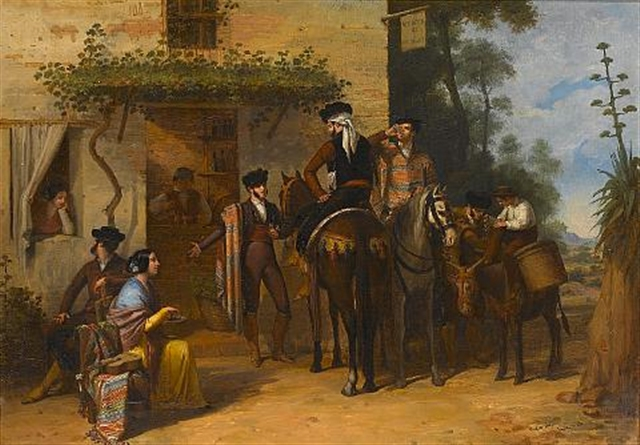
An 1849 painting by Joaquín Domínguez Bécquer is typical of Andalusian costumbrismo.

Costumbrismo is an art form developed by Spanish painters. In the 19th century, a wave of nationalistic fervour took hold, providing the stimulus for painters to focus on local customs (or costumbres). As in literary costumbrismo, Madrid and Andalusia (particularly Seville) were Spain's two great centers of costumbrismo in the visual arts. Andalusian costumbrista paintings were mainly romantic and folkloric, largely devoid of social criticism. Much of their market was to foreigners for whom Andalusia epitomized their vision of a Spain distinct from the rest of Europe. The costumbrista artists of Madrid were more acerbic, sometimes even vulgar, in portraying the life of lower class Madrid. More of their market was domestic, including to the often snobbish (and often Europeanizing and liberal) elite of the capital. Among other things, the School of Madrid often used large masses of solid color and painted with a broad brush, while the School of Seville painted more delicately. The Madrid paintings have a certain urgency, while the Seville paintings are typically serene, even misty. The Madrid painters focus more on unique individuals, the Sevillianos on individuals as representatives of a type.

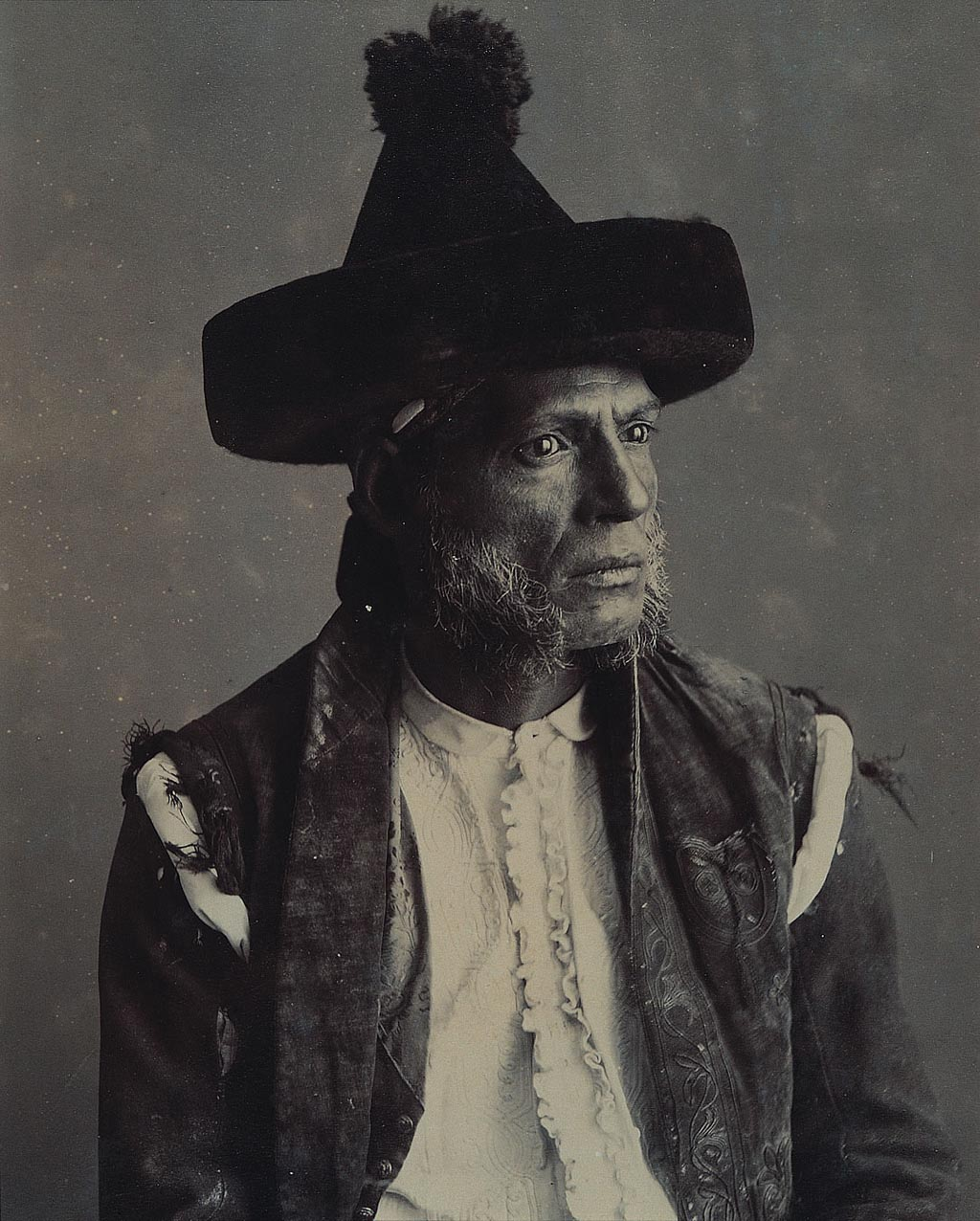
Costumbrismo can also be found in photography, as in this image of an Andalusian Gypsy wearing a sombrero de catite.

Romantic Andalusian costumbrismo (costumbrismo andaluz) follows in the footsteps of two painters of the School of Cádiz, Juan Rodríguez y Jiménez, "el Panadero" ("the Baker", 1765–1830) and Joaquín Manuel Fernández Cruzado (1781–1856), both associated with Romanticism. The trend was continued by the School of Seville, in a city much more on the path of a foreign clientele. The founding figure was José Domínguez Bécquer (1805–41), father of the poet Gustavo Adolfo Bécquer (see above) and painter Valeriano Bécquer (1833–70), who moved to Madrid. Domínguez Bécquer's influence came as an art teacher, as well as an artist. His student and cousin Joaquín Domínguez Bécquer (1817–79) was known for his acute observation of light and atmosphere. Another of José Domínguez Bécquer's students, the bold and forceful Manuel Rodríguez de Guzmán (1818–67), may have been the genre's strongest painter.

Other important early figures were Antonio Cabral Bejarano (1788–1861), best known for paintings of individuals theatrically posed against rural backgrounds, and an atmosphere reminiscent of Murillo, and José Roldán (1808–71), also very influenced by Murillo, known especially as a painter of children and urchins. One of Cabral Bejarano's sons, Manuel Cabral Bejarano (1827–91) began as a costumbrista, but eventually became more of a realist. Another son, Francisco Cabral Bejarano (1824–90), also painted in the genre.

Other painters of the School of Seville were Andrés Cortés (1810–79), Rafael García Hispaleto (1833–54), Francisco Ramos, and Joaquín Díez; history painter José María Rodríguez de Losada (1826–96); and portraitist José María Romero (1815–80).

Typical subject matter included majos (lower class dandies) and their female equivalents, horsemen, bandits and smugglers, street urchins and beggars, Gypsies, traditional architecture, fiestas, and religious processions such as Holy Week in Seville.

The School of Madrid was united less by a common visual style than by an attitude, and by the influence of Goya rather than Murillo. Notable in this school were Alenza and Lameyer, both contributors to Los españoles pintados por sí mismos. Alenza, in particular, showed a strong influence from the Flemish painters as well as from Goya. A fine portraitist who tended to take his subjects from among the common people, in some ways he epitomizes the difference between the School of Madrid and that of Seville. For him the "official" Romanticism was a topic to satirize, as in his series of paintings Suicidios románticos ("Romantic suicides").

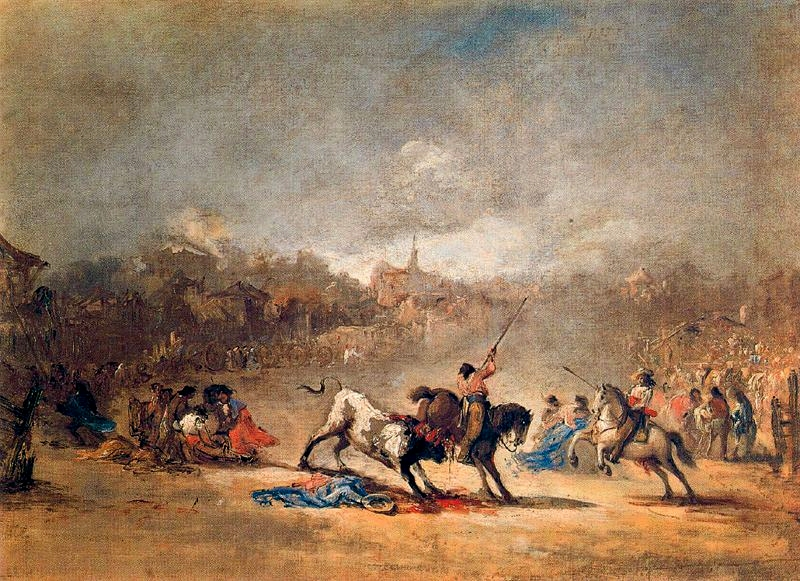
"Tercio de varas" ("Picadors"), Eugenio Lucas Velázquez c. 1850

Probably foremost in the School of Madrid was Eugenio Lucas Velázquez (1817–70). An artistic successor to Goya (though a more erratic painter than the master), Lucas Velázquez's work ranged from bullfighting scenes to Orientalism to scenes of witchcraft. His son Eugenio Lucas Villamil (1858–1918) and his students Paulino de la Linde (1837-?) and José Martínez Victoria followed in his tracks; he was also a strong influence on Antonio Pérez Rubio (1822–88) and Ángel Lizcano Monedero (1846–1929).

José Elbo (1804–44) was at least strongly akin to the School of Madrid. Although born in Úbeda in the Andalusian province of Jaén, Elbo studied painting in Madrid under José Aparicio (1773–1838), and was influenced by Goya; he was also influenced by the Central European equivalents of costumbrismo. His painting is rife with social criticism, and often angrily populist.

Also in Madrid, but not really part of the School of Madrid, was Valeriano Bécquer (transplanted son of José Domínguez Bécquer). Although also influenced by Goya (and by Diego Velázquez), his work in Madrid did partake of some of the socially critical aspects of the other painters of that city, but not of the satiric aspects: his portraits of common people emphasize their dignity, seldom their foibles.

The dark vision of 20th-century Madrid painter José Gutiérrez Solana (1886–1945) was influenced by costumbrismo and also directly by the Black Paintings of Goya that had so influenced the costumbristas.

== Visual costumbrismo in the Americas ==
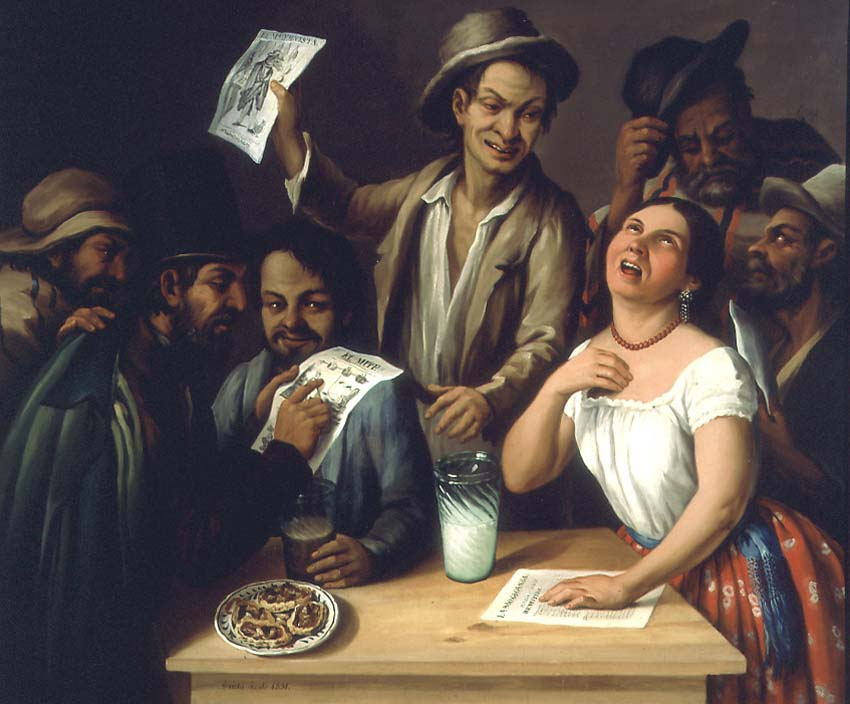
José Agustín Arrieta, Tertulia de pulquería, 1851

In nineteenth-century Mexico, colonial-era casta paintings, a type of secular genre painting depicting racial categories and hierarchy disappeared at independence when casta categories were abolished, but costumbrismo paintings resonated with the stereotypes of the earlier genre. A number of foreign visitors to Mexico produced images in the costumbrista tradition, including Claudio Linati and Edouard Pingret. The most significant Mexican costumbrista painter is José Agustín Arrieta, whose paintings of a market scene ("La Sorpresa"), a kitchen scene ("La Cocina Poblana"), and a tavern scene (Tertulia de pulquería) are well known. One less famous than Arrieta is Manuel Serrano (ca. 1830-ca. 1870s), about whom little is known. His painting Vendador de buñuelos, depicting a fritter seller in an urban night scene is in the collections of the Mexican government. Another less well known Mexican artist is es:Felipe Santiago Gutiérrez (1824-1904), who was also a writer, teacher, art critic, intellectual, and cultural diplomat."

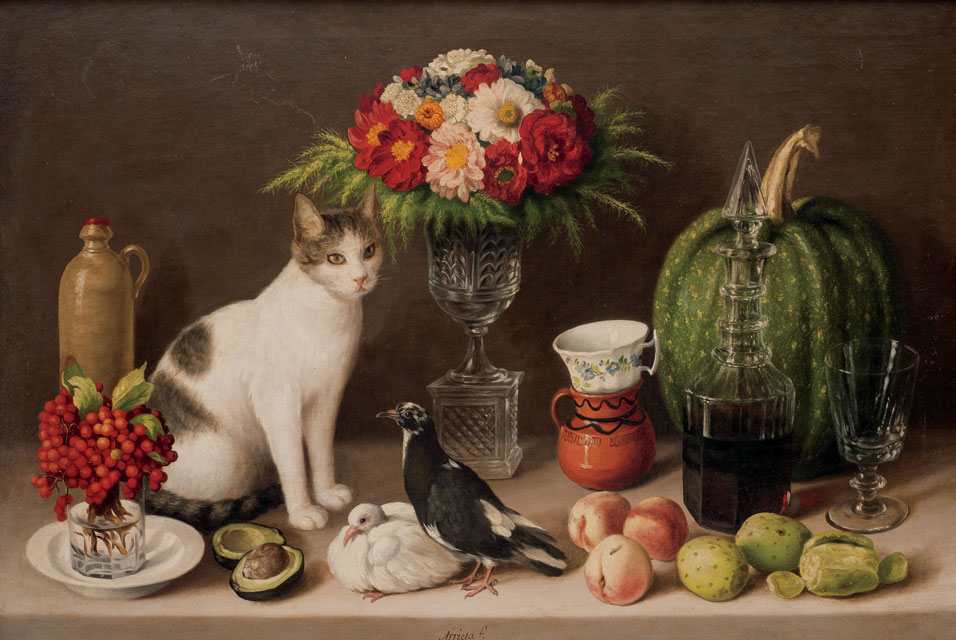
José Agustín Arrieta, Still Life with Cat and Birds

== Literary costumbrismo in the Americas ==
=== Argentina ===
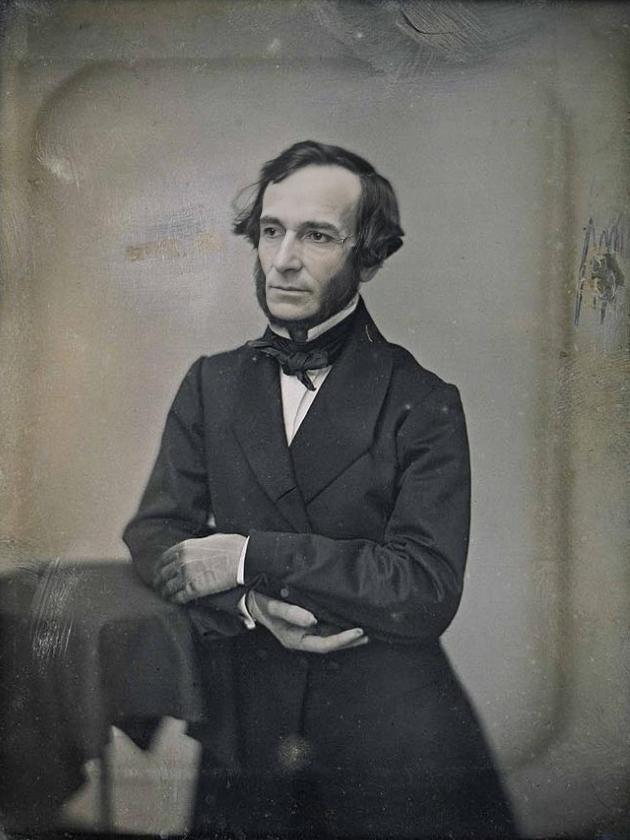
Juan Bautista Alberdi

Some of Argentina's most distinguished writers worked in the costumbrista genre in at least some of their writing, though few worked narrowly within the genre. Esteban Echeverría (1805–51) was a politically passionate Romantic writer whose work has strong costumbrista aspects; his El Matadero ("The Slaughterhouse") is still widely read. Juan Bautista Alberdi (1810–84) and Domingo Faustino Sarmiento (1811–1888) both wrote at times in the genre, as did José Antonio Wilde (1813–83), in Buenos Aires desde setenta años atrás ("Buenos Aires from seventy years ago"); Vicente G. Quesada (1830–1913), in Recuerdos de un viejo ("Memories of an old man"); Lucio V. López (1848–94), in the novela La gran aldea ("The big village"); Martín Coronado (1850–1919), playwright; Martiniano Leguizamón (1858–1935), in the novel Montaraz; José S. Alvarez (1858–1903, "Fray Mocho"), in the story "Viaje al país de los matreros" ("A trip to bandit country"); Emma de la Barra (1861–1947), who wrote under the pseudonym César Duayen, in Stella; Joaquín V. González (1863–1923), in Mis montañas ("My Mountains"); Julio Sánchez Gardel (1879–1937), in numerous comedies; and Manuel Gálvez (1882–1962), in such novels as La maestra normal ("The normal school teacher") and La sombra del convento ("The sleep of the convent").

=== Bolivia ===
Bolivian costumbristas include Julio Lucas Jaimes (1845–1914), Lindaura Anzoátegui de Campero (1846–98), Jaime Mendoza (1874–1938), Alcides Arguedas (1879–1946), and Armando Chirveches (1881–1926).

=== Central America ===
Guatemalan novelist and historian José Milla (1822–82) wrote several costumbrista works and created the character of Juan Chapín, the emblematic Guatemalan. Other Central American costumbristas are José María Peralta Lagos (1873–1944, El Salvador), Ramón Rosa (1848–93, Honduras), Carlos Alberto Uclés (1854–1942, Honduras), and a distinguished line of Costa Rican writers: Manuel de Jesús Jiménez (1854–1916), Manuel González Zeledón (1864–1936), the verse writer Aquileo Echeverría (1866–1909), and, in the 20th century, Joaquín García Monge (1881–1958).

=== Chile ===
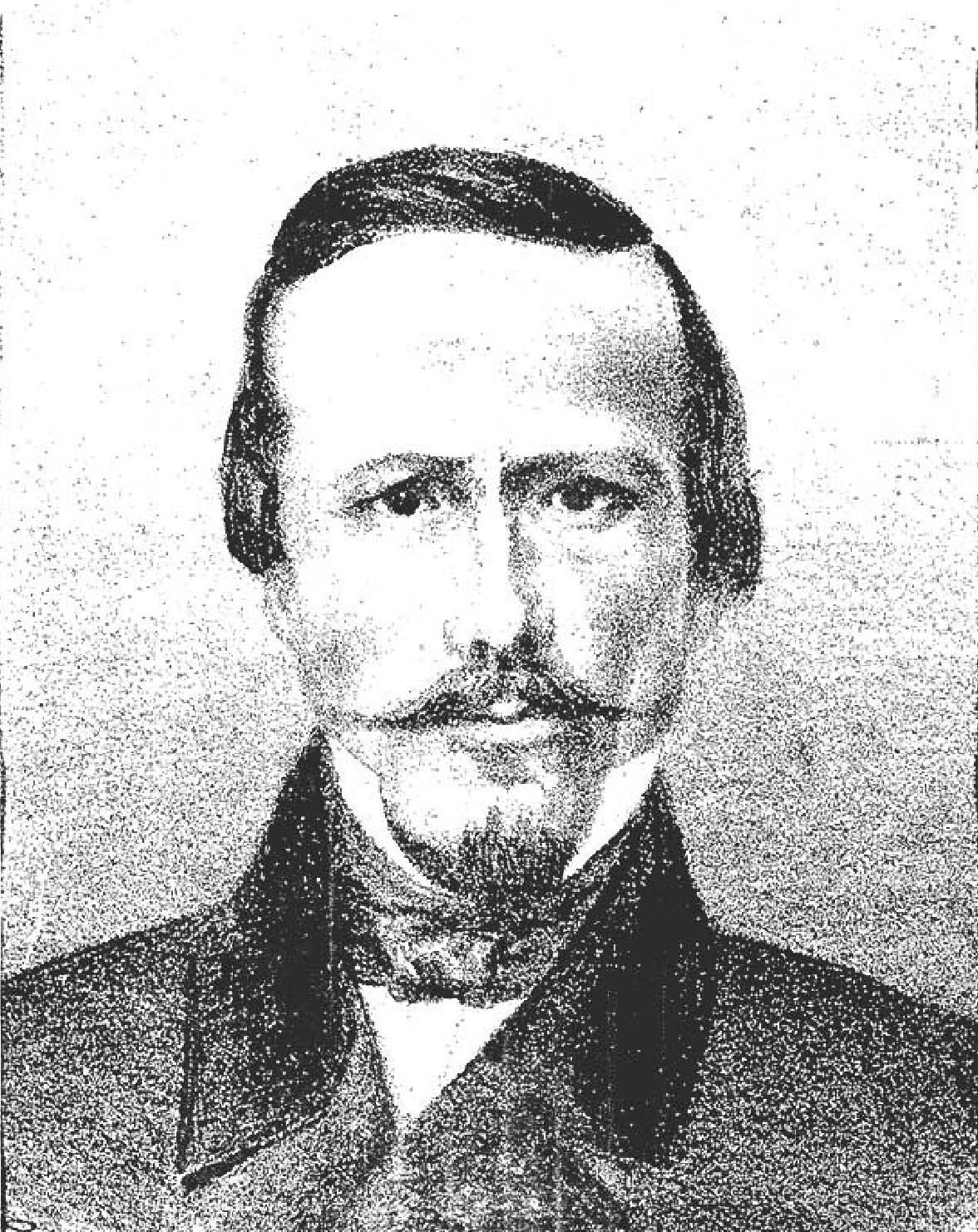
José Joaquín Vallejo ("Jotabeche") The Chilean Larra

Costumbrismo enters Chilean literature in some of the writing of José Zapiola (1804–85), Vicente Pérez Rosales (1807–86), Román Fritis (1829–74), Pedro Ruiz Aldea (ca. 1833–70) and especially José Joaquín Vallejo (1811–58), who under the name "Jotabeche" was the supreme Chilean costumbrista.

Strong aspects of costumbrismo can be seen in the novels and other works of Alberto Blest Gana (1830–1920). There are many costumbrista passages in the works of Benjamín Vicuña Mackenna (1831–86) and Daniel Barros Grez(1833–1904); Román Vial (1833–1896) entitled one of his books Costumbres chilenas; Zorobabel Rodríguez (1839–1901), Moisés Vargas (1843–98), Arturo Givovich (1855–1905), Daniel Riquelme (1854–1912), Senén Palacios (1858–1927), Egidio Poblete (1868–1940) all wrote in the mode at times. Costumbrismo figures particularly heavily in stage comedies: El patio de los Tribunales ("The courtyard of the tribunals [of justice]", by Valentín Murillo (1841–1896); Don Lucas Gómez, by Mateo Martínez Quevedo (1848–1923); Chincol en sartén ("A sparrow in the pan") and En la puerta del horno ("In the gate of horn"), by Antonio Espiñeira (1855–1907); La canción rota ("The broken song"), by Antonio Acevedo Hernández (1886–1962); Pueblecito ("Little town") by Armando Moock (1894–1942). In prose, costumbrismo mixes eventually into realism, with Manuel J. Ortiz (1870–1945) and Joaquín Díaz García (1877–1921) as important realists with costumbrista aspects.

=== Colombia ===
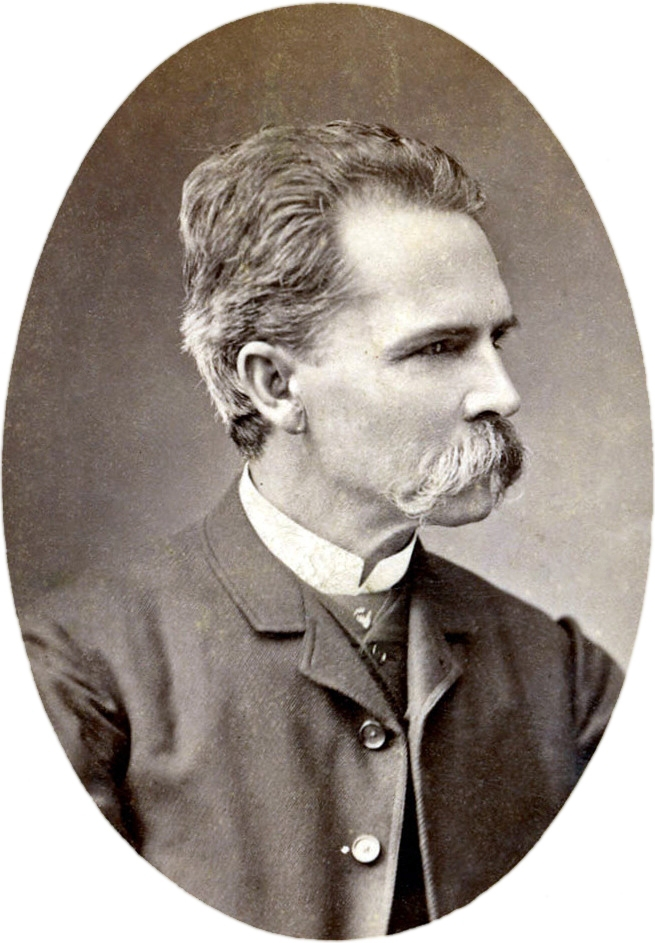
Jorge Isaacs

Colombia can claim one of the earliest antecedents to the costumbrismo in El Carnero (written 1636–38, but not published until 1859) by Juan Rodríguez Freile (1566–1638 or 1640). Rodríguez's work begins as a chronicle of the conquest of New Granada, but as it approaches his own time it becomes more and more detailed and quotidian, and its second half is a series of narratives that, according to Stephen M. Hart, give "lip service" to conventional morality while taking "a keen delight in recounting the various skullduggeries of witches, rogues, murderers, whores, outlaws, priests and judges."

Colombia can also claim a particularly rich tradition of costumbrismo in the 19th century and into the 20th: José Manuel Groot (1800–78); novelists Eugenio Díaz (1803–65), José Manuel Marroquín (1827–1908), and José María Vergara y Vergara (1831–72), all of whom collaborated on the magazine El Mosaico, la revista bogotana del costumbrismo (1858–71); Luis Segundo Silvestre (1838–87); and Jorge Isaacs (1837–95), whose sole novel María was praised by Alfonso M. Escudero as the greatest Spanish-language romantic novel.

Other Colombian costumbristas are José Caycedo Rojas (1816–1897), Juan de Dios Restrepo (1823–94), Gregorio Gutiérrez González (1826–72), Ricardo Carrasquilla (1827–86), Camilo A. Echeverri (1827–87), Manuel Pombo (1827–98), José David Guarín (1830–90), Ricardo Silva (1836–87), José María Cordovez Moure (1835–1918), Rafael María Camargo (1858–1926; wrote under the pseudonym Fermín de Pimentel y Vargas), and Tomás Carrasquilla (1858–1940).

=== Cuba ===
Cuba's leading costumbristas were Gaspar Betancourt Cisneros (1803–66, known as "El Lugareño"), Cirilo Villaverde (1812–94), and José María de Cárdenas y Rodríguez (1812–82). The patrician Betancourt published a series of Escenas cotidianas que abren camino al costumbrismo en Cuba ("Everyday scenes that pave the way for costumbrismo in Cuba, 1838–40). His work focused often on what he found vulgar or ridiculous about Cuban life, but was written with a fatherly affection. Villaverde, probably Cuba's greatest costumbrista, wrote romantic novels, most notably Cecilia Valdés (the first part of which was published in 1839, although the definitive version was not published until 1882). This costumbrista anti-slavery novel can be seen as an early realist work, and continues to be read in recent times. Villaverde also wrote the prologue for Cárdenas's 1847 collection of costumbristaarticles.

José Victoriano Betancourt (1813–75) was patron to many intellectuals in 1860s Havana; he later went into exile in Mexico. He is best remembered today as a costumbrista writer, as is another Betancourt, José Ramón Betancourt (1823–90), author of Una feria de caridad en 183… (ellipses in original title), set in Camagüey in the late 1830s.

=== Dominican Republic ===
In the Dominican Republic, Francisco Gregorio Billini (1844–98) stands out for his novel Baní o Engracia y Antoñita (1892). Still, in some ways, his vision was narrow. J. Alcántara Almánzar remarks that "black people are practically absent as important characters, and this absence is very significant in a country whose majority is 'mulatto'." Blacks are more present in the costumbrista works of Cesar Nicolas Penson (1855–1901), but he is far more sympathetic to his white characters, portraying Haitians as fierce beasts.

=== Ecuador ===
Ecuadorians who wrote at least part of the time in the costumbrista mode include Pedro Fermín Cevallos (1812–93), Juan León Mera (1832–94), José Modesto Espinosa (1833–1915), Carlos R. Tobar (1854–1920), Honorato Vázquez (1855–1933), Víctor M. Rendón (1859–1940), J. Trajano Mera (1862–1919), and Luis A. Martínez (1868–1909). Another Ecuadorian was Alfredo Baquerizo Moreno (1859–1951), a novelist and later president of the country.

=== Mexico ===
Mexican costumbrismo can claim one of the longest lineages to be found in the Americas. In the same era in which the genre was gaining an identity in Spain, José Joaquín Fernández de Lizardi (1776–1827) Mexico's first novelist (and perhaps Latin America's first novelist) wrote works that had many similar aspects, including Periquillo Sarniento (1816), recently translated into English as The Mangy Parrot. Other Mexican costumbristas are Guillermo Prieto (1818–97) and José Tomás de Cuéllar (1830–94). In addition, José López Portillo y Rojas (1850–1923), Rafael Delgado (1853–1914), Ángel del Campo (1868–1908) and Emilio Rabasa (1856–1930) can be seen as costumbristas, but their work can also be considered realist.

=== Paraguay ===
Paraguayan costumbristas include Teresa Lamas de Rodríguez Alcalá (1887–1976) and Carlos Zubizarreta (1904–72).

=== Peru ===
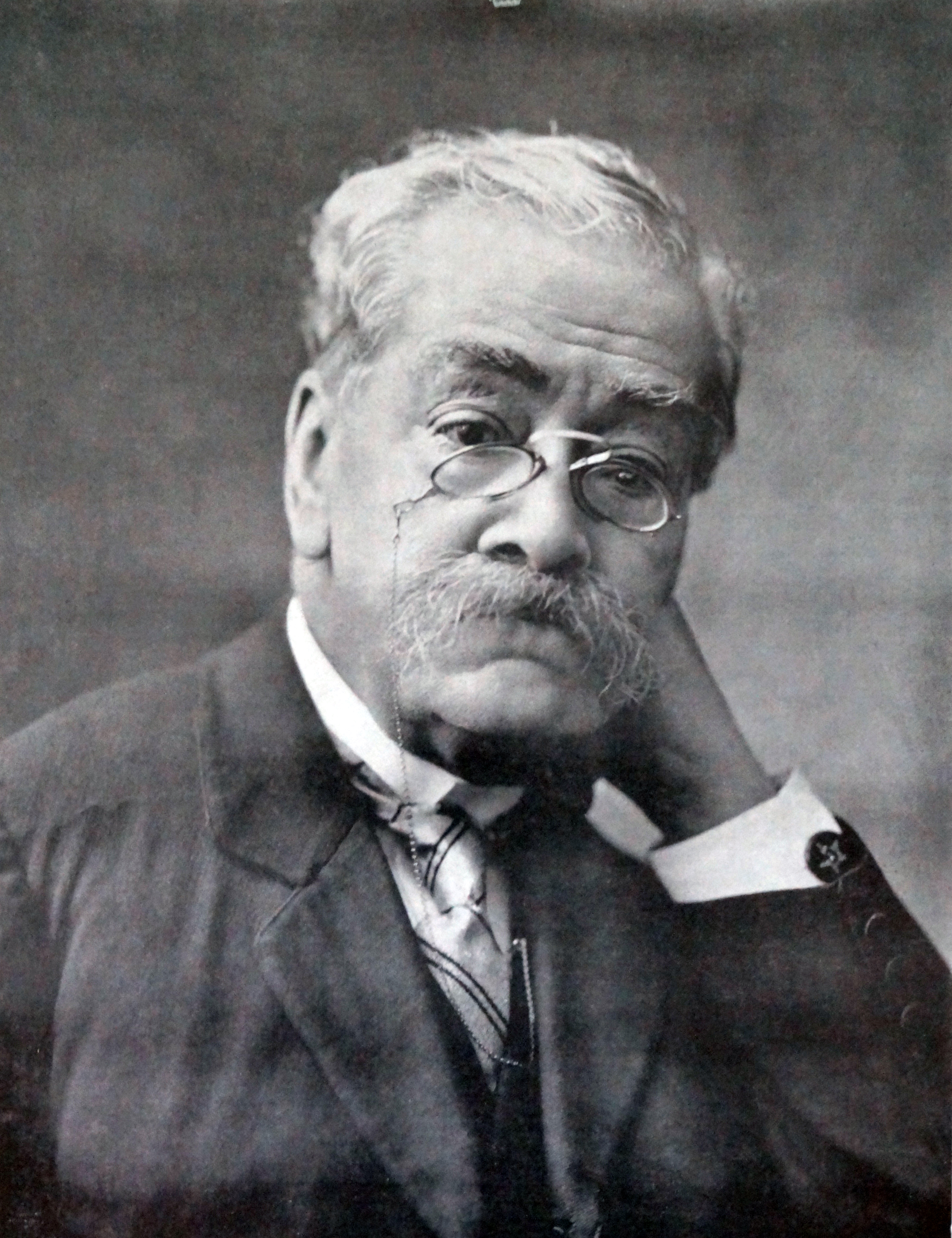
Ricardo Palma

Peruvian costumbrismo begins with José Joaquín de Larriva y Ruiz (1780–1832), poeta and journalist and his younger, irreverent, Madrid-educated collaborator Felipe Pardo y Aliaga (1806–68). A more festive and comic note was struck by Manuel Ascensio Segura (1805–71). Manuel Atanasio Fuentes (1820–29) wrote verse under the name El Murciélago ("the Bat"), a name which he also gave to a magazine he founded.

Ricardo Palma (1833–1919), best known for the multi-volume Tradiciones peruanas, was a man of letters, a former liberal politician and later the director of the National Library of Peru, who rebuilt the collection of that library after the War of the Pacific. He referred to his works in this mode as tradiciones, rather than costumbrismo.

Other Peruvian costumbristas are satirist and verse writer Pedro Paz Soldán y Unanue (1839–1895), Abelardo M. Gamarra (1850–1924), and the nostalgic José Gálvez (1885–1957).

=== Puerto Rico ===
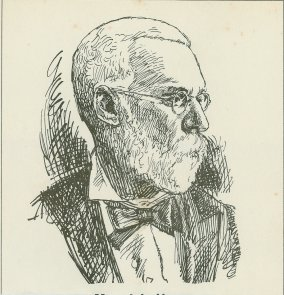
Illustration of Manuel A. Alonso

In Puerto Rico, Manuel A. Alonso (1822–89) published El gibaro: cuadro de costumbres de la isla de Puerto Rico (The Jíbaro [modern spelling]: picture of customs of the island of Puerto Rico", 1849), Puerto Rico's most important contribution to the genre. Manuel Fernández Juncos (1846–1928), born in Asturias, Spain, emigrated at age eleven to the island and wrote Tipos y caracteres y Costumbres y tradiciones ("Types and characters and customs and traditions").

=== Uruguay ===
Prominent Uruguayan costumbristas include Santiago Maciel (1862–1931), Manuel Bernárdez (1867–1942), Javier de Viana (1868–1926), Adolfo Montiel Ballesteros (1888–1971), and Fernán Silva Valdés (1887–1975). Most of these writers also did significant work outside of the genre.

=== Venezuela ===
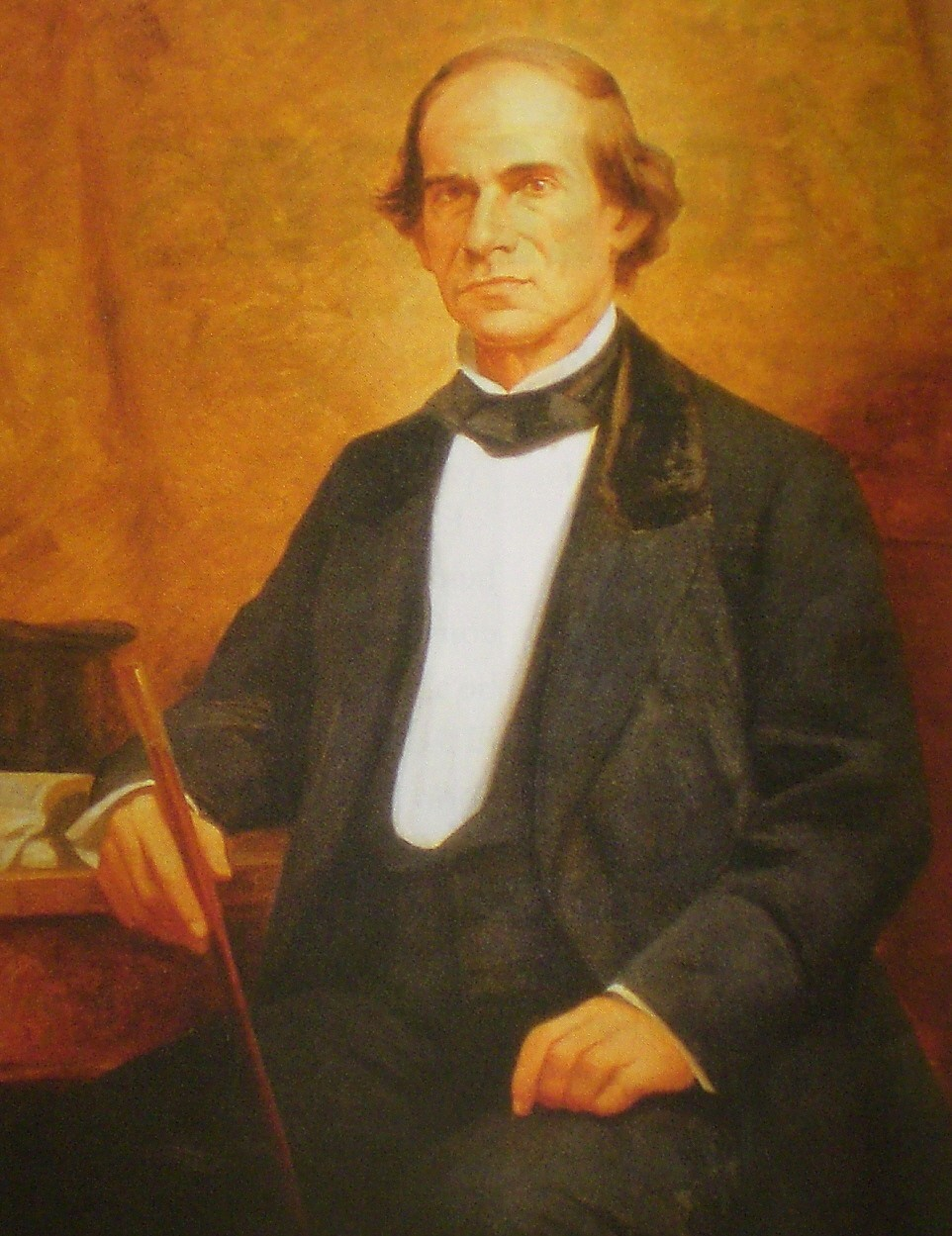
Venezuelan diplomat and writer Fermín Toro, portrait by Antonio Herrera Toro

Venezuelan costumbristas include Fermín Toro (c.1807–65), Daniel Mendoza (1823–67), Francisco de Sales Pérez (1836–1926), Nicanor Bolet Peraza (1838–1906), Francisco Tosta García (1845–1921), José María Rivas (1850–1920), Rafael Bolívar Alvarez (1860–1900), and Pedro Emilio Coll (1872–1947).

== See also ==
- Genre painting
