= Trueba =

Trueba is a Spanish surname of Basque origins. It derives from the Trueba river. Notable people with the surname include:

- Antonio de Trueba (1819–1889), Spanish poet, novelist, and folklorist
- Andrés Martínez Trueba (1884–1959), Uruguayan politician
- Vicente Trueba (1905–1986), Spanish cyclist
- Fernando Trueba (born 1955), Spanish screenwriter, film director and producer
- David Trueba (born 1969), Spanish writer, film director and screenwriter
- Jonás Trueba, born 1981) Spanish film maker
