= Francisco Lameyer =

Spanish painter

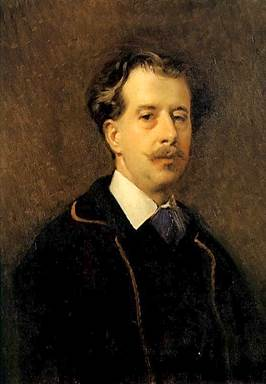
Francisco Lameyer; portrait by Raimundo Madrazo (1866)

Francisco Lameyer y Berenguer (13 September 1825 – 3 June 1877) was a Spanish painter and illustrator. His early genre works show the strong influence of Goya, but his later Orientalist works owe more to Delacroix.

== Biography ==
He was born in El Puerto de Santa María, but his family moved to Madrid when he was still a child. As soon as he was old enough, he began working with the engraver, Vicente Castelló. Later, he made contributions to El Siglo Pintoresco, a magazine founded by Castelló.

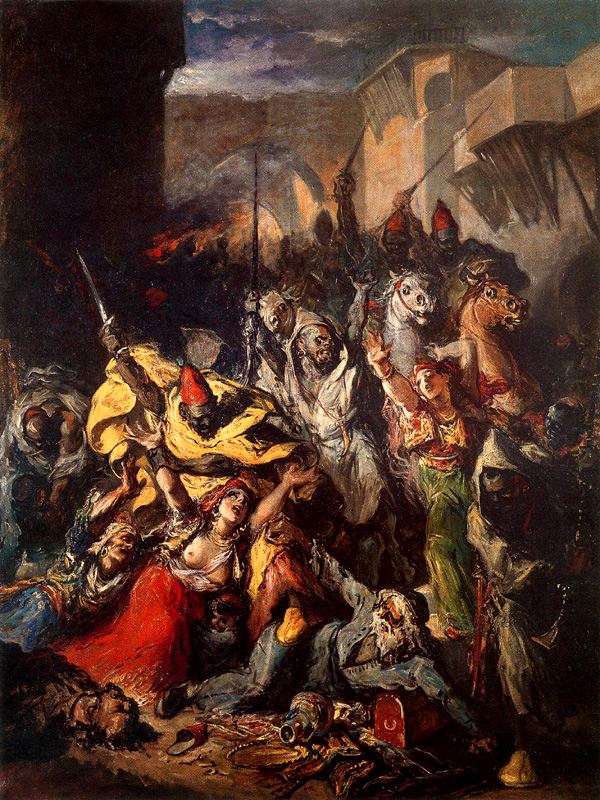
Assault of the Moors

In 1841, he entered the Real Academia de Bellas Artes de San Fernando, where he studied with José de Madrazo, met his son, Luis and, through him, became friends of the entire Madrazo family. Two years later, prompted by a need to support his family and possibly inspired by the love for ships he felt while growing up in a major port, he joined the Spanish Navy as an administrative official.

Although this prevented him from pursuing his artistic career, he continued to do work in his spare time; completing 125 drawings for Escenas Andaluzas by Serafín Estébanez Calderón (published in 1847). During this period, he may have had an affair that produced two children, but he never married.

From 1854 to 1859, he was in the Philippines, where he managed the commissary and, later, the entire post. The humid climate proved to be unhealthy for him, however and, after a brief illness, he developed rheumatism. He returned to Spain in 1860 to seek treatment, but saw little improvement. A year later, with a doctor's recommendation, he retired from the service and devoted himself entirely to his art.

In 1863, he accompanied Marià Fortuny (whom he had met through the Madrazos) on a trip to Morocco, where he visited Tangier and Tetuan. The country was still in some disarray from the recent Hispano-Moroccan War. This served as the inspiration for his best-known work, Assault of the Moors, depicting an 18th-century raid on the Jewish quarter of Tetuan. Upon returning to Madrid, he set up a studio and began to create paintings from the sketches he had made. For reasons that are unclear, he resisted the idea of participating in exhibitions.

In 1871, after his father died of a sudden "mental illness", he turned to painting portraits, beginning with one of his mother. From 1872 to 1873 he visited Egypt and Palestine. While in Egypt, he acquired several antiquities, which he sold to the National Archaeological Museum of Spain, thus relieving him of some financial burdens.

He continued to live in Madrid, but made frequent trips to Paris; partly due to the political instability in Spain that resulted in the Third Carlist War. Under the constant stress, his "rheumatism" revealed itself as tuberculosis and his health declined rapidly. His mother died early in 1877. Exhausted by the funeral and the mourning, he died five months later.

== Other selected paintings ==
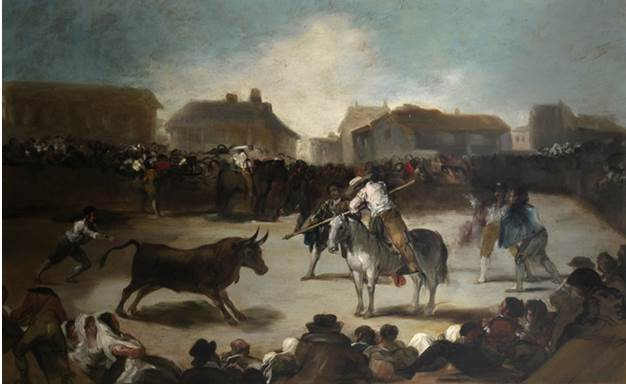
Bullfight

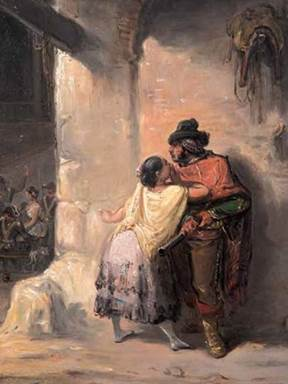
Confidences of the Bandit

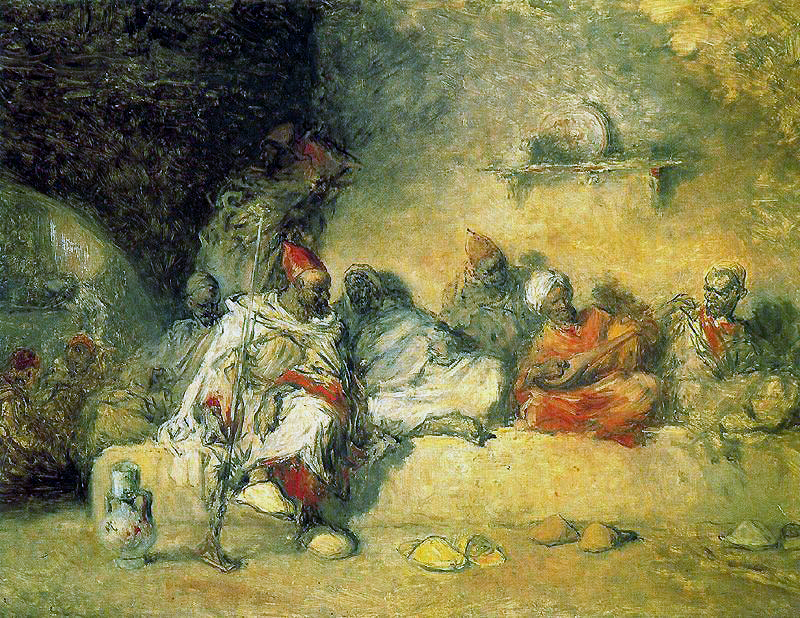
Interior with Moors

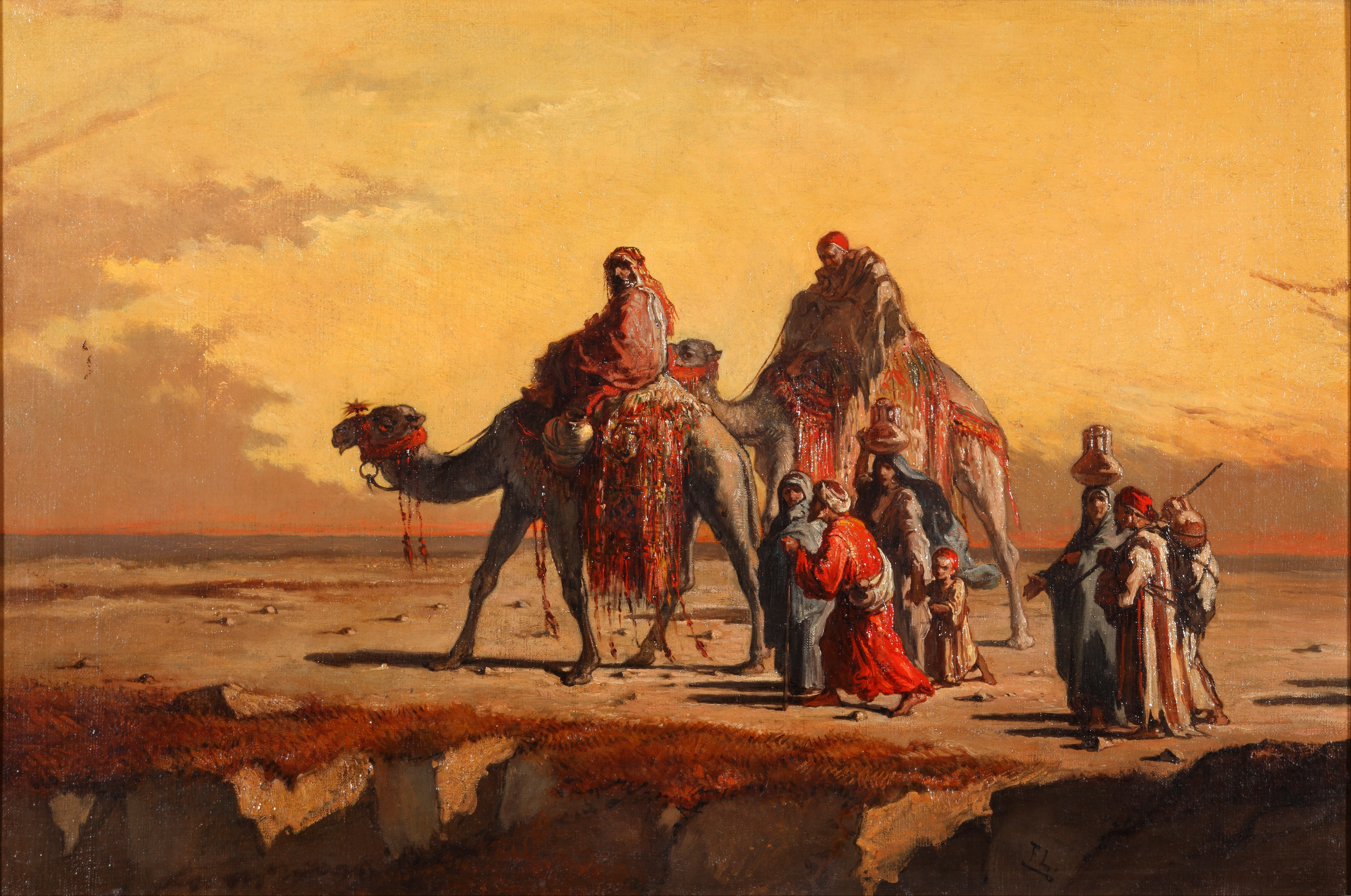
Desert Scene
