= Leonardo Alenza =

Spanish painter

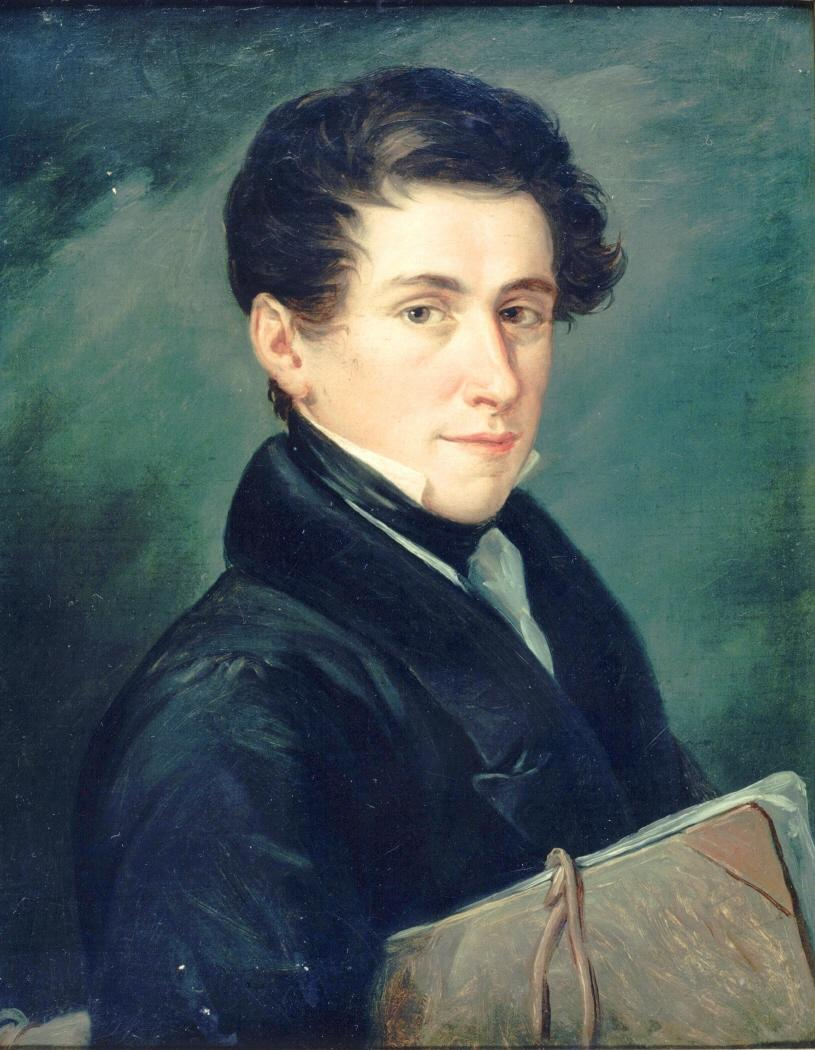
Self-portrait (1824)

Leonardo Alenza y Nieto (6 November 1807, Madrid – 30 June 1845, Madrid) was a Spanish painter and engraver in the Romantic style; associated with the Costumbrista movement.

== Biography ==
His father, Valentín, was a government employee and amateur poet, who succeeded in having some poems published in the Diario de Madrid. His mother died around 1813, when he was only six or seven.

In 1817, his father remarried. His step-mother was only eleven years older than he was. Soon after, the family moved from the busy neighborhood where they lived, to a quieter street near a Jesuit convent. He probably began his higher education there, at the Colegio Imperial de la Compañía de Jesús.

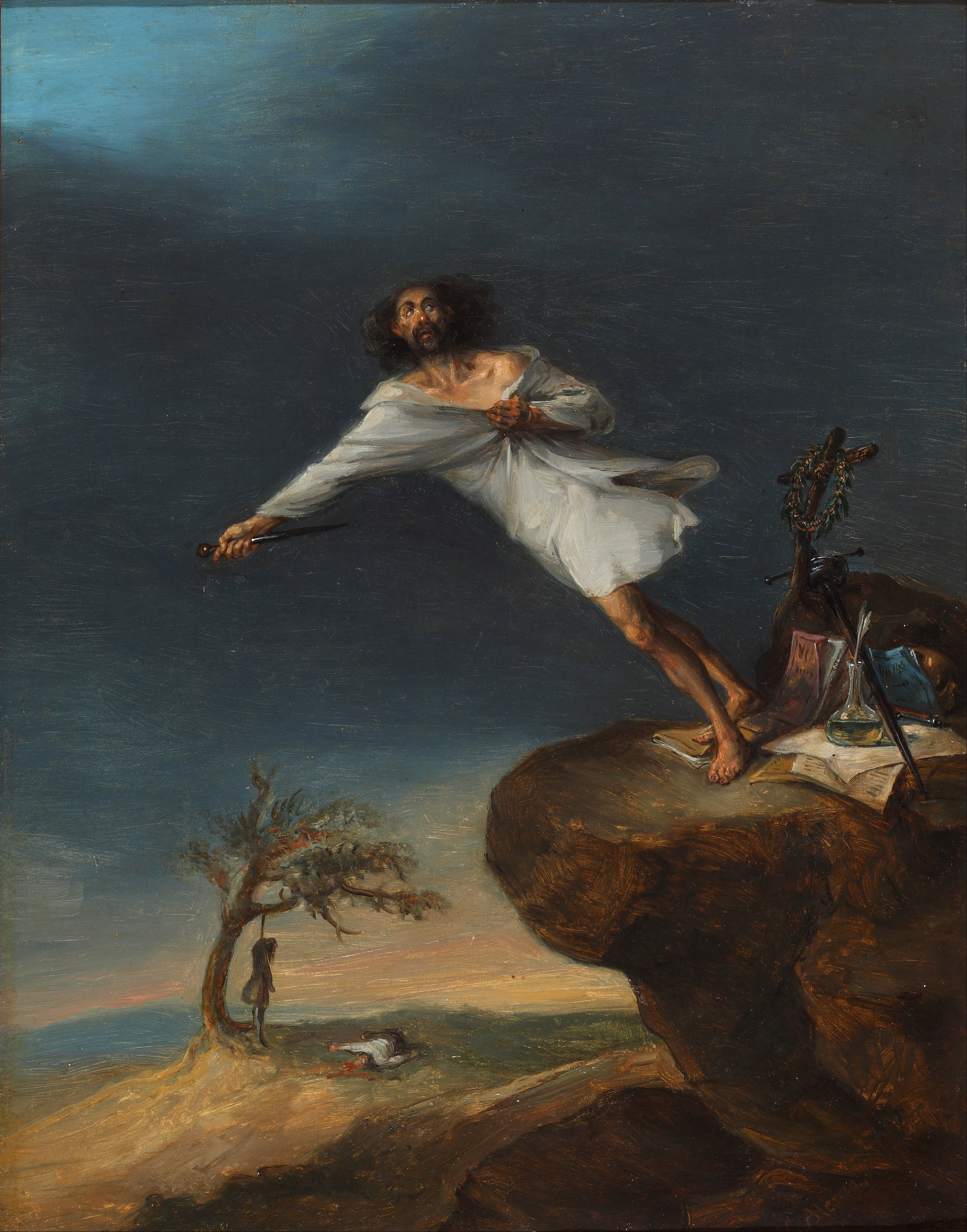
Satire on Romantic Suicide (1839), his best known work.

In 1819, at age 16, he was enrolled at the Academia de San Fernando, where he initially studied with the painters Zacarías González Velázquez, Juan Antonio Ribera and José Aparicio, as well as the engraver Vicente Peleguer (1793-1865) and the sculptor Esteban de Agreda (1759–1842). He finished his studies there with José Madrazo.

He remained attached to the Academy until 1833, when he received a commission from the Ayuntamiento of Madrid to paint an allegorical picture of Isabella becoming Queen at the age of three. The following year, he created a cenotaph honoring the late King Fernando VII, composed of five panels done in grisaille.

In 1838, he began providing drawings for the Semanario Pintoresco Español, published by Ramón de Mesonero Romanos, and exhibited some capriccios at the Academy. Two years later, he collaborated with the Semanario to produce illustrations for a new edition of the novel Gil Blas and the complete works of Francisco de Quevedo. He also created decorations for the popular Café de Levante.

In 1842, the Academy awarded him the title of "Académico de Mérito" for his painting of David cutting off the head of Goliath. This would be his last major work, as he had been suffering from tuberculosis for several years and was in very poor health. Despite this, he managed to serve as a professor for a few months.

Meanwhile, he was living in a cow barn, because he had become convinced that the fumes there were beneficial. Nothing helped, however, and he died in 1845 at the age of 38. He had become impoverished by then and his friends had to intervene to prevent his burial in a common grave.

== Other selected paintings ==
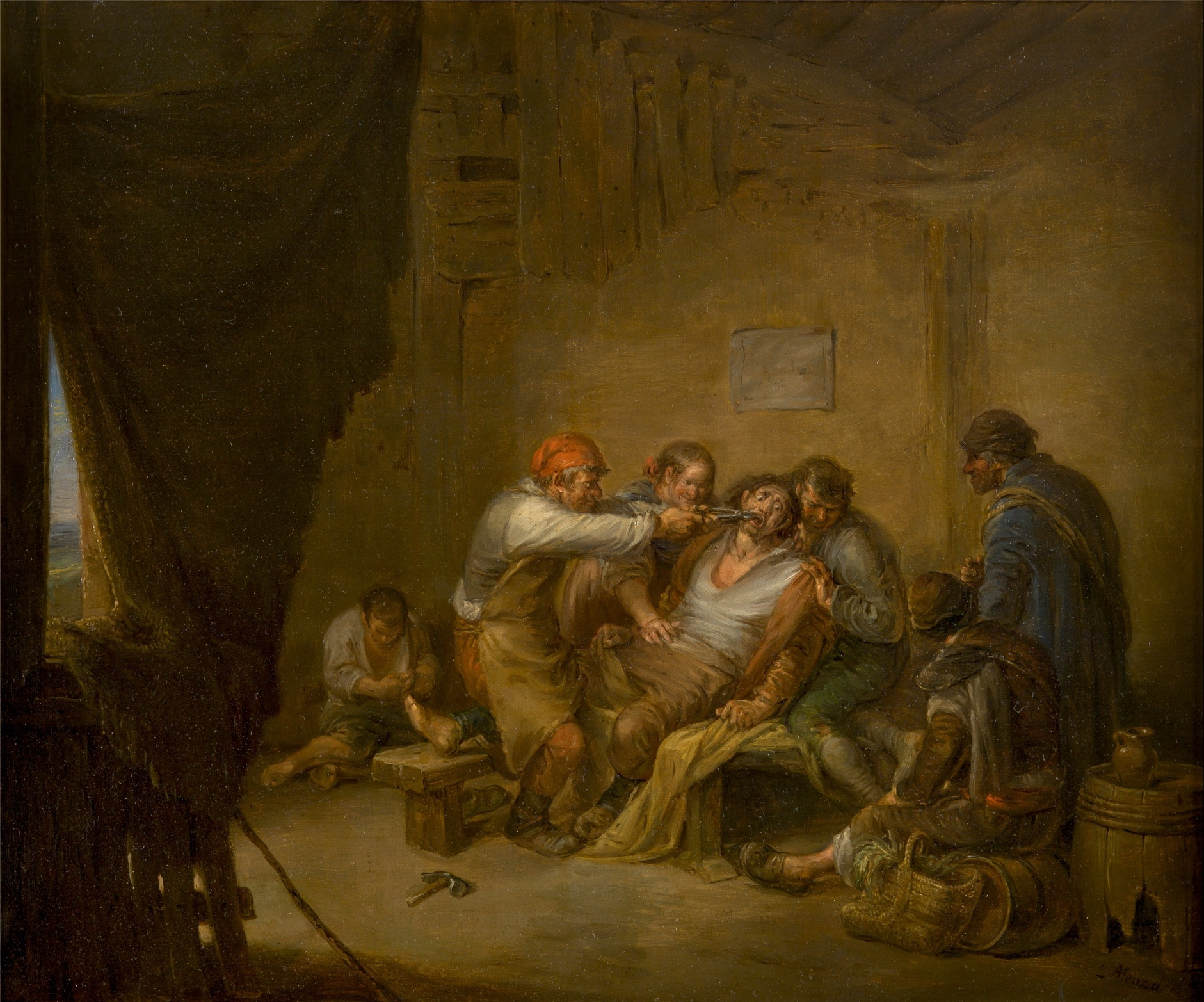
The Toothpuller (1844)

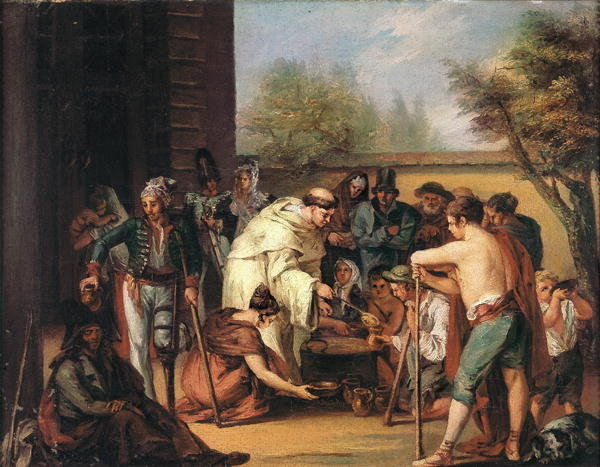
Distributing Soup (c.1835)

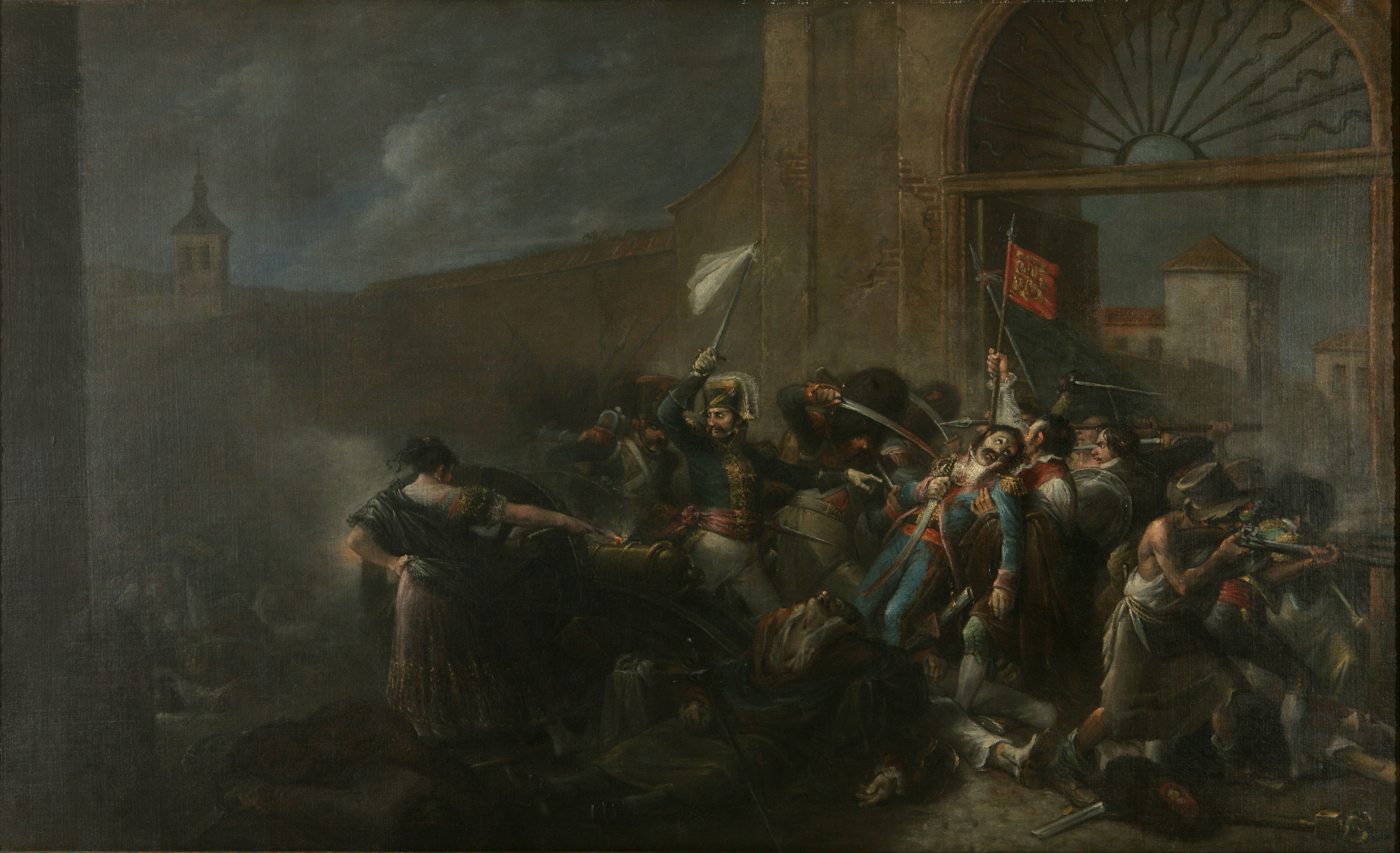
The Death of
Luis Daoíz y Torres (1835)

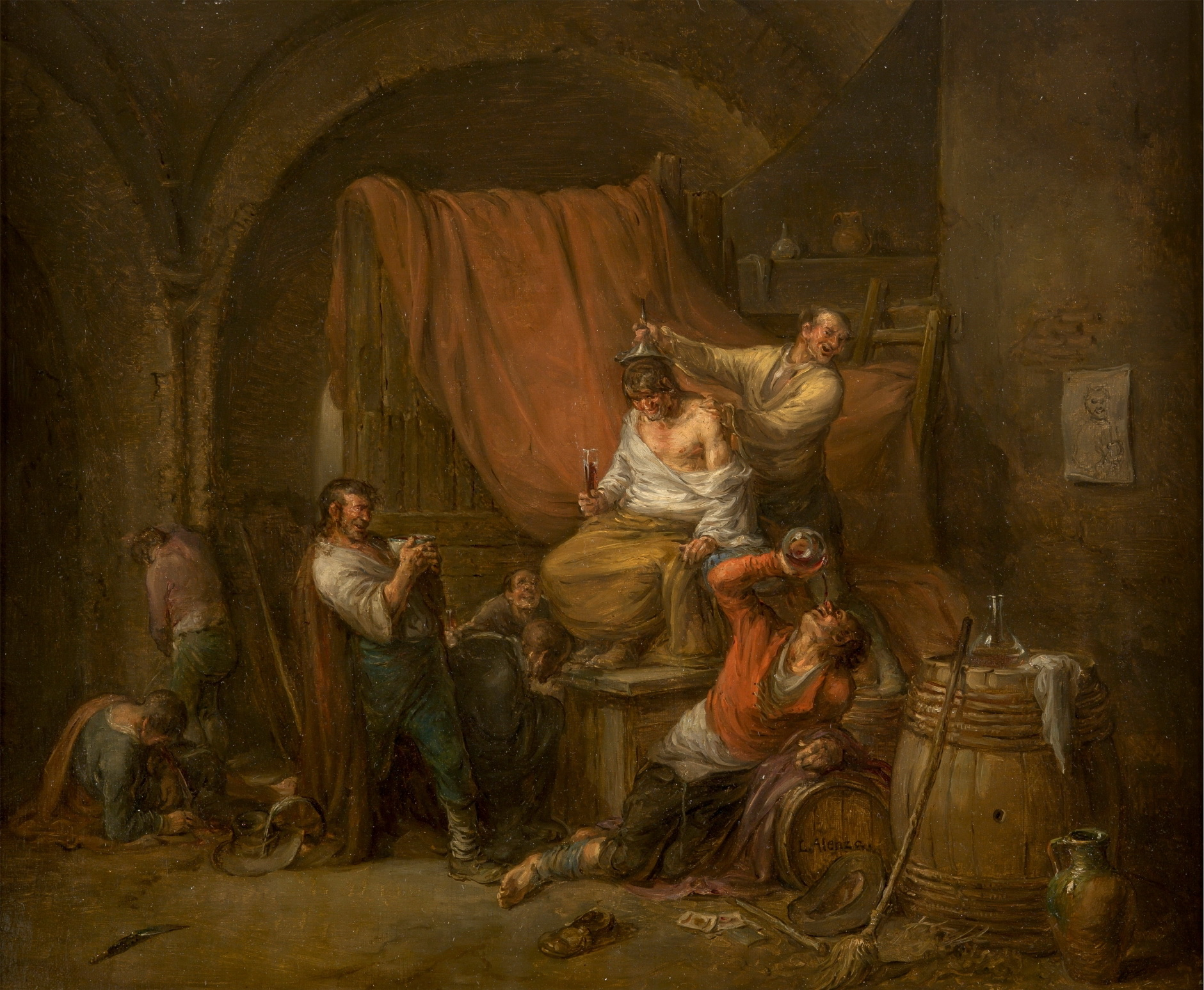
The Triumph of Bacchus (1844)
