= Emma de la Barra =

Argentine writer

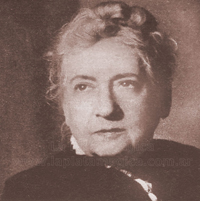
Emma de la Barra

Emma de la Barra, known by the pseudonym César Duáyen, (1861-1947) was an Argentine writer, best known for her novels Stella (1905) and Mecha Iturbe (1906) which were praised for their portrayal of modern women. She is closely associated with the Costumbrismo movement. Stella became the first best-seller in the country, and in 1943 it was adapted into a film starring Zully Moreno as the character of Stella. Other notable works include El Manantial (1908), Eleonora (1933) and La dicha de Malena (1943).

== See also ==
- Lists of writers
