= Teresa Lamas de Rodríguez Alcalá =

Paraguayan writer

Teresa Lamas Carísimo de Rodríguez Alcalá (1887 – 1976) was a Paraguayan author, writing primarily in the genre of costumbrismo. Her book Tradiciones del hogar was the first novel written by a woman in Paraguay.

== Biography ==
Lamas Carísimo was born in Asunción, Paraguay, in 1887, although her birth year is sometimes reported as being 1889. Her parents were Vicente Lamas and Clementina Carísimo, members of the local colonial elite. She received a public education and began writing at a young age; in 1919, she won first prize in a national story-writing contest.

She published Tradiciones del hogar, a collection of vignettes on family life and nationalist themes in the style known as costumbrista or tradición, in 1921. It was well received by the literary community and was important to the country's national mythmaking after the Paraguayan War. Tradiciones de hogar was followed with a second volume in 1928. She published two later works in the 1940s and '50s: Huerto de Odios and La casa y tu sombra. She also contributed to various newspapers.

Lamas Carísimo was also known for her philanthropic work; she co-founded the National Association of Charitable Dames, an anti-tuberculosis organization, in 1918 and was a member of the local Red Cross.

== Selected works ==
- Tradiciones del hogar, Volume I (1921)
- Tradiciones del hogar, Volume II (1928)
- Huerto de Odios (1944)
- La casa y su sombra (1955)
