= José Nogales =

Spanish journalist and writer

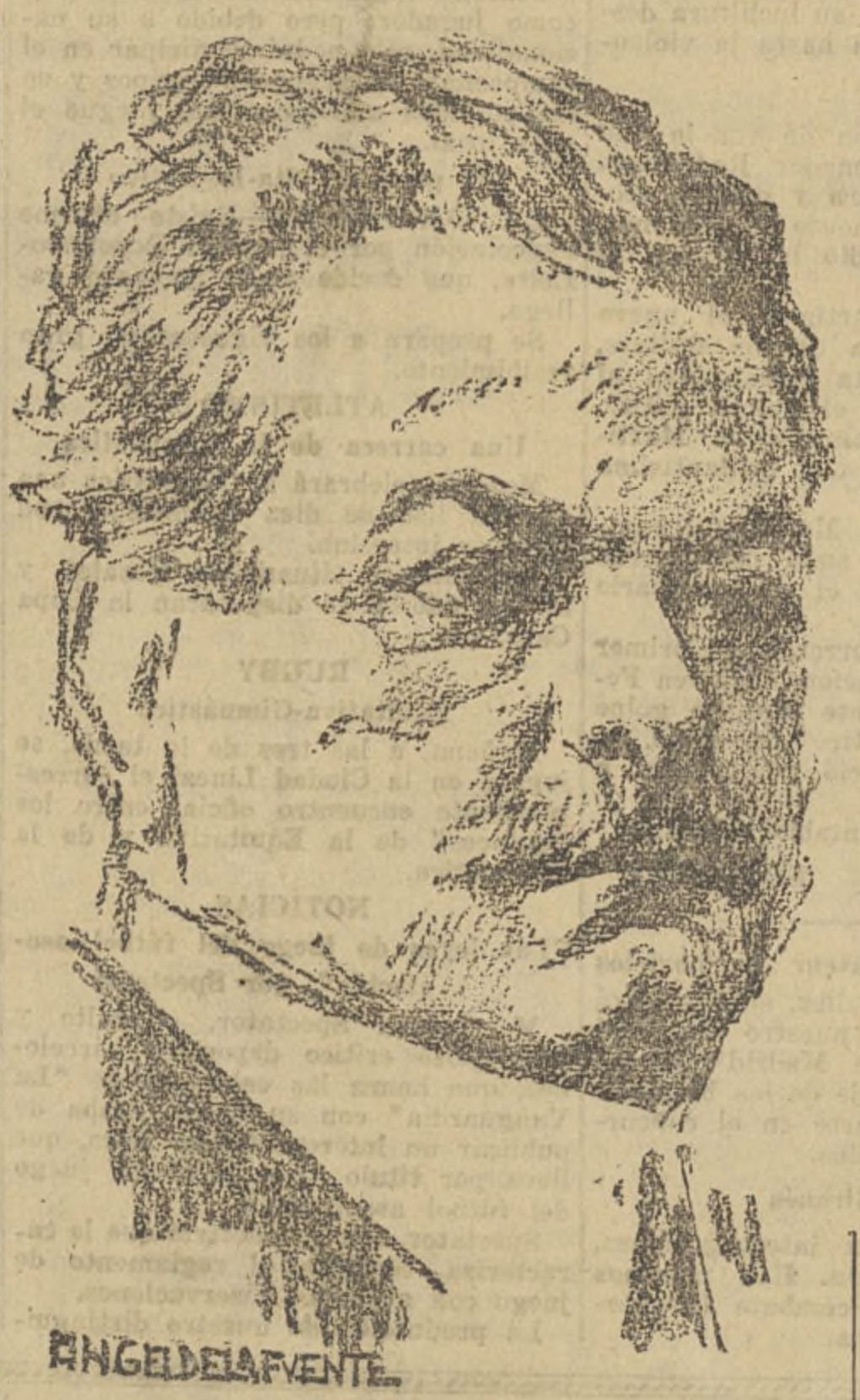
Portrait of José Nogales

José Nogales (October 21, 1860 – December 7, 1908) was a Spanish journalist and writer.

== Works ==
=== Novels ===
- Ladybug Lion (1901)
- The Patriot (1901)

=== Stories ===
- Mosaic (1891)
- In the depths of hell or zurrapas of the century (1896)
- Rocío Letters (1900)
- Types and customs (1901)
- The three things Uncle John (1905)
