= Nicanor Bolet Peraza =

Venezuelan politician and writer (1838–1906)

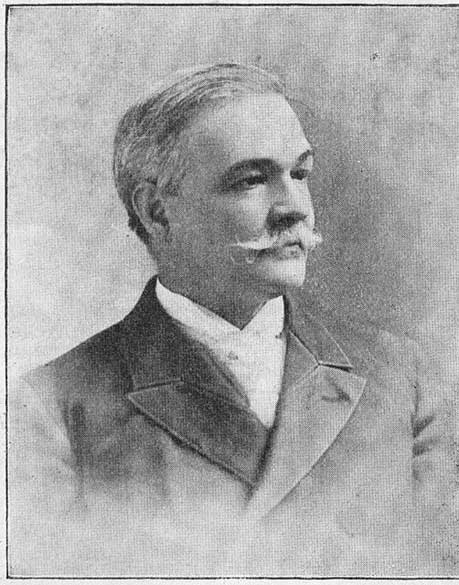
- Born: June 4, 1838; Caracas, Venezuela
- Died: March 24, 1906 (aged 67); New York City, United States
- Writing career
- Notable work: Historia de un guante (1892)

Nicanor Bolet Peraza (June 4, 1838 – March 25, 1906) was a Venezuelan writer and politician.

== Early life ==
Peraza was born in Caracas, Venezuela in 1838 to Nicanor Bolet Poleo y Egaña and María del Pilar Peraza Sosa. He was one of six siblings and was the younger brother of the artist Ramon Bolet Peraza. At the age of one Peraza and his family relocated to Barcelona, Venezuela where his father would establish a printing press. This press would soon work both Ramon and Nicanor who would both go on to pursue interests in publication. Eventually Nicanor and Ramon established their first magazine, El Oasis. Nicanor would be pushed away from publishing due to the declaration of the Federal War in 1859. At the age of 21, he enlisted in the federal army and fought in Venezuela's largest war since Spanish independence. Following the Federalist victory in 1863, Peraza would return to his birthplace of Caracas and work together with his brother to establish the Rotary Museum Illustrated, a political newspaper. Peraza would also soon marry María Perfecta Monagas Marrero and have four children.

== Political career ==
Having earned the rank of Brigadier General during the war, Peraza took an active role in national policy. He was appointed as a representative in congress while simultaneously maintaining his work in publication which largely focused on national opinion. After the former vice-president, Antonio Guzman Blanco, had assumed the presidency in 1870, Peraza had initially been supportive of the new regime in hopes of peace, prosperity, and stability, yet soon grew bitter of Guzman's abuse of power. When Guzman was ousted in 1877 and Francisco Linares Alcántara rose to power, Peraza had embraced the new policy and quickly became one of Alcántara's strongest supporters which would eventually earn him a position as secretary of the Ministry of the Interior and Justice. This prompted Peraza's push to pursue generous and reconciliation policies towards Venezuelan exiles from the war. Due to Alcántara's untimely death in 1878, Antonio Guzman would retake control of the government. To counter Guzman's regime, Peraza frequently published newspapers that censured and criticized Guzman and his government. Subsequent targeting of opposition by Guzman would cause Peraza to exile himself to the United States in 1880 along with his family for the rest of his life.

== In exile ==
In New York, after having been forced to leave a successful publishing and political career in Venezuela, Bolet Peraza found himself starting a new life at the age of 42. Despite this, Peraza managed to find success by building on his prior pursuits as an editor and writer. He became the editor of two Spanish-language illustrated magazines in New York City. From 1885-1890, he was the principle editor of La Revista Ilustrada de Nueva York (New York Illustrated Magazine), in which José Martí's essay "Nuestra América" ("Our America) first appeared. Later, he founded and edited Las Tres Américas (The Three Americas) from 1893-1896.

His editing work, however, could be seen as only part of an expansive career. Peraza’s writing prowess and political inclination fueled him in most professional endeavors. From a government position (U.S. Ambassador to Venezuela) whose offer incited his resignation from La Revista, to his own publication years down the line. Peraza had also frequently collaborated with other prominent Hispanic figures such as fellow countryman Juan Antonio Pérez Bonalde and Cuban poet José Martí. Working alongside Martí during his time in New York, Peraza (while lesser known and acknowledged) shared many similar views. Part of what may have left him lingering behind a bit might have been his lack of view into the danger’s the U.S. posed to Latin America. Instead, Peraza saw the industrialization and innovations to be something Latin America could and should have. Again unlike Marti, Peraza failed to acknowledge that the same forward movement he thought the U.S. to have would be a detriment and lethal weapon in terms of Latin America.

In 1888, the president of Venezuela, Juan Pablo Rojas Paúl, recognized Peraza's prominence as a Venezuelan writer and appointed him Plenipotentiary and Envoy Extraordinary to Washington. After a successful career in Washington, Peraza returned to New York to resume his work in publication. In 1895, Peraza was invited to attend the 100th anniversary of José Gregorio Monagas, a past Venezuelan president who fought for emancipation and had been Peraza's father-in-law. After accepting the invitation from the current president, Peraza returned to his native land in order take part in the commemorations. Though he was moved to excitement about experiencing his homeland once more, he ultimately decided to return to New York. Peraza died 11 years later at the age of 67, just a few months shy of his birthday.

== Selected Authored & Edited Works ==
- El Oasis. Barcelona (1856)
- El Museo Venezolano, Barcelona (1865-1866)
- La Opinión Nacional, Caracas (1869)
- La Tribuna Liberal, Caracas (1877)
- La Revista Ilustrada de Nueva York, New York (1885-1890)
- Las Tres Américas, Nueva York (1893-1896)
- Cosmópolis, Caracas (1894)
- Cartas Grendaleses (1900)
- El Valor Civico. A la Juventud Hispano-Americana (1901)
- Impressiones de viaje (1906)
- Artículos de costumbres y literarios. Barcelona, Editorial Araluce (1931)
