= Fernando Miranda y Casellas =

American sculptor

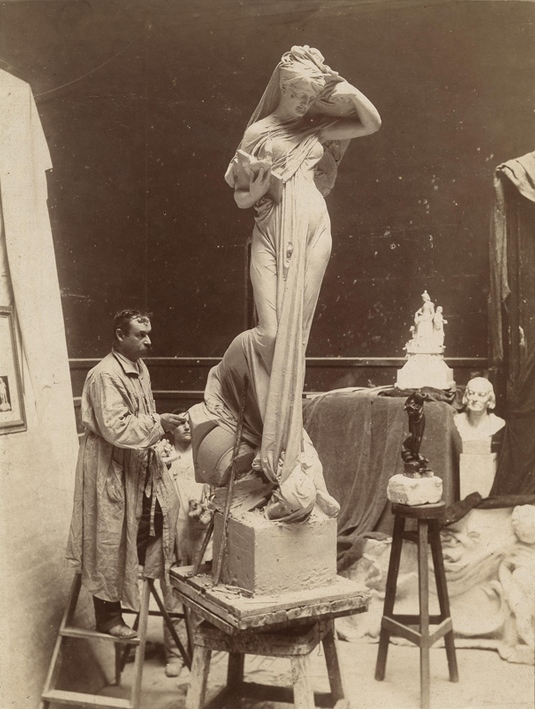
Fernando Miranda in his studio with his model of The Spirit of Research (c. 1897). His Bust of Columbus is at far right.

Fernando Miranda y Casellas (1842 – May 9, 1925) was a Spanish-American sculptor, architectural sculptor and illustrator.

He was born in Valencia, Spain, the son of an illustrator of the same name, and studied under sculptor José Piquer II. He moved to the United States prior to the 1876 Centennial Exposition, and settled in New York City. For several years he worked as an illustrator for the Spanish-language magazine La Ilustración Española y Americana, and contributed to Frank Leslie's Illustrated Newspaper.

In 1878, he designed a 30-foot monument honoring Spanish author Miguel de Cervantes to be erected in Central Park. The project was eventually abandoned due to lack of funding, but Miranda's Bust of Cervantes stood in the park for more than a quarter-century.

He designed a 100-foot diameter fountain honoring Christopher Columbus to be erected in Central Park along 5th Avenue, but sculptor Gaetano Russo's Columbus Monument already was planned for nearby Columbus Circle. Alternate sites for the fountain were proposed at Battery Park and Harlem, but this project also was abandoned. Instead of an original work by Miranda, Central Park commissioned a copy of sculptor Jeronimo Suñol's Columbus statue in Madrid, which was dedicated in 1894.

Following the Boston Public Library's notorious 1896 rejection of Frederick William MacMonnies's nude sculpture Bacchante and Infant Faun, Miranda prepared a replacement work for the courtyard's fountain. The Spirit of Research was a sober figure of a gowned woman lifting a veil—a metaphor for education. It was installed at the center of the fountain in 1898, but removed by the 1920s. A copy of MacMonnies's statue was restored to the fountain in 1993.

He was a member of the National Sculpture Society, and served as first president of the American Sculpture Society.

King Alfonso XIII of Spain made him a Knight in 1890.

== Selected works ==
- Bust of Ignacio Vergara Gimeno (1858), Plaza Temple, Valencia, Spain. A posthumous 1965 cast from a student work by Miranda. The bust was stolen in 1996, and a new cast was made in 1999.
- Cervantes Monument (1878, unexecuted), proposed for Central Park.
  - Bust of Miguel de Cervantes (c. 1878), installed in Central Park by 1892, removed after 1918.
- Bas-relief of Slumber.
- Head of Christ.
- Columbus Fountain (c. 1892, unexecuted), proposed for Central Park.
  - Bust of Columbus (c. 1892).
  - Sketch of Columbus and the Brothers Pinzon (c. 1892).
- Four terra-cotta Angels (1895–96), American Tract Society Building, 150 Nassau Street, New York City, Robert H. Robertson, architect. The 20-foot angels adorn the building's penthouse. They were restored in 2013-14 by Boston Valley Terra Cotta.
- The Spirit of Research (1897–98), made for the Boston Public Library.
- Equestrian statue of George Washington (c. 1898, unexecuted) proposed for Newark, New Jersey.
- Fame (1903–04). A colossal female figure made for the 1904 St. Louis World's Fair.
- City Hall Fountain (1906), City Hall Rotunda, Savannah, Georgia.
- The Primitive Marksman – Indian Shooting at a Soaring Eagle (1907), New York Historical Society, New York City.
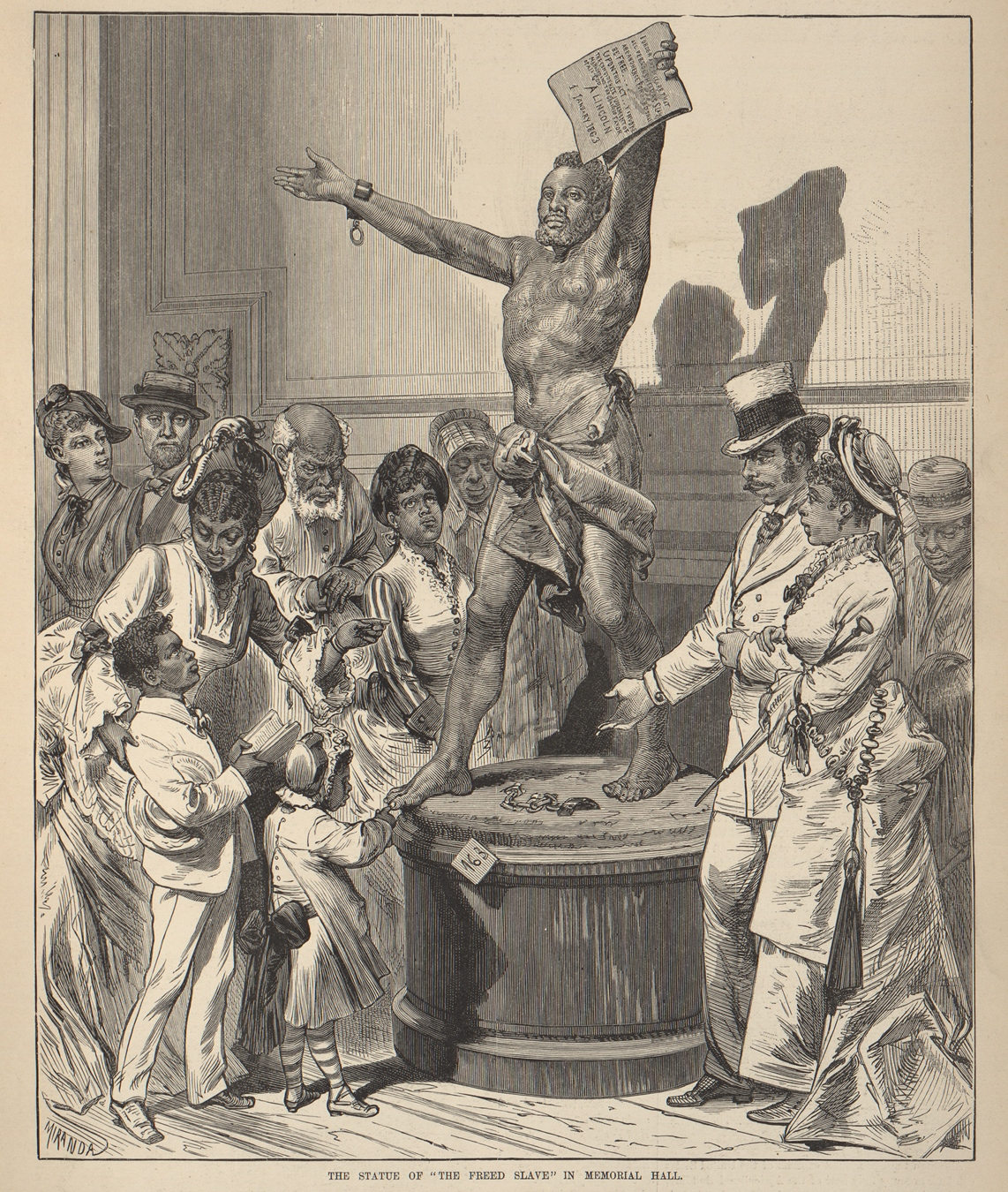
1876 illustration by Miranda.

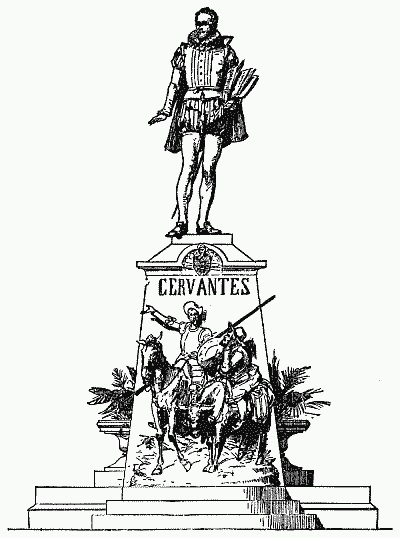
Unexecuted proposal for the Cervantes Monument in Central Park (1878).

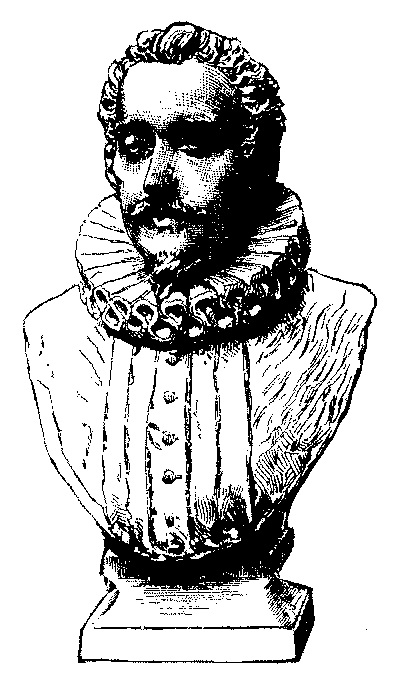
Bust of Cervantes (c. 1878).

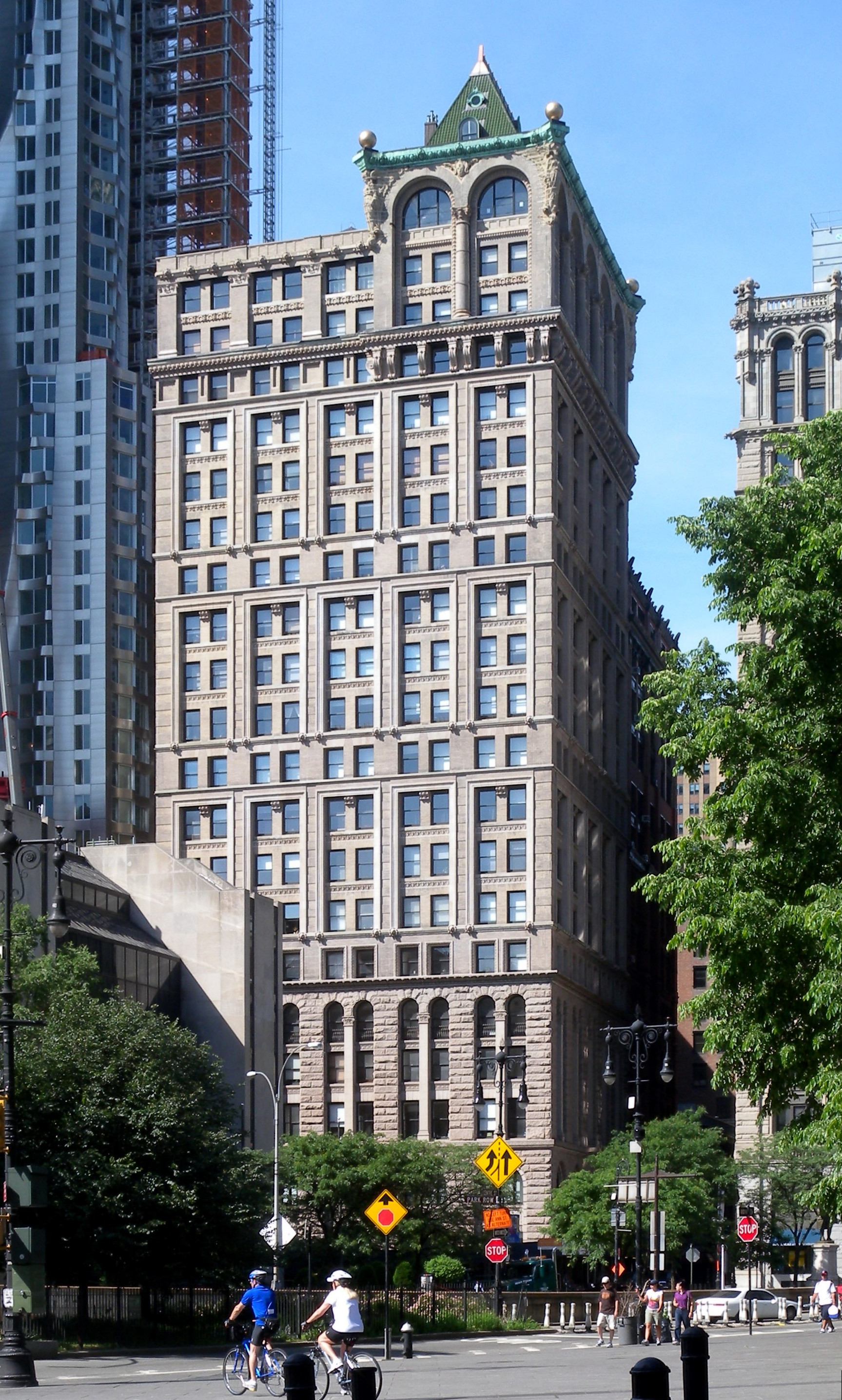
American Tract Society Building (1895–96), New York City. Miranda's angels support the globes at the corners of the penthouse.

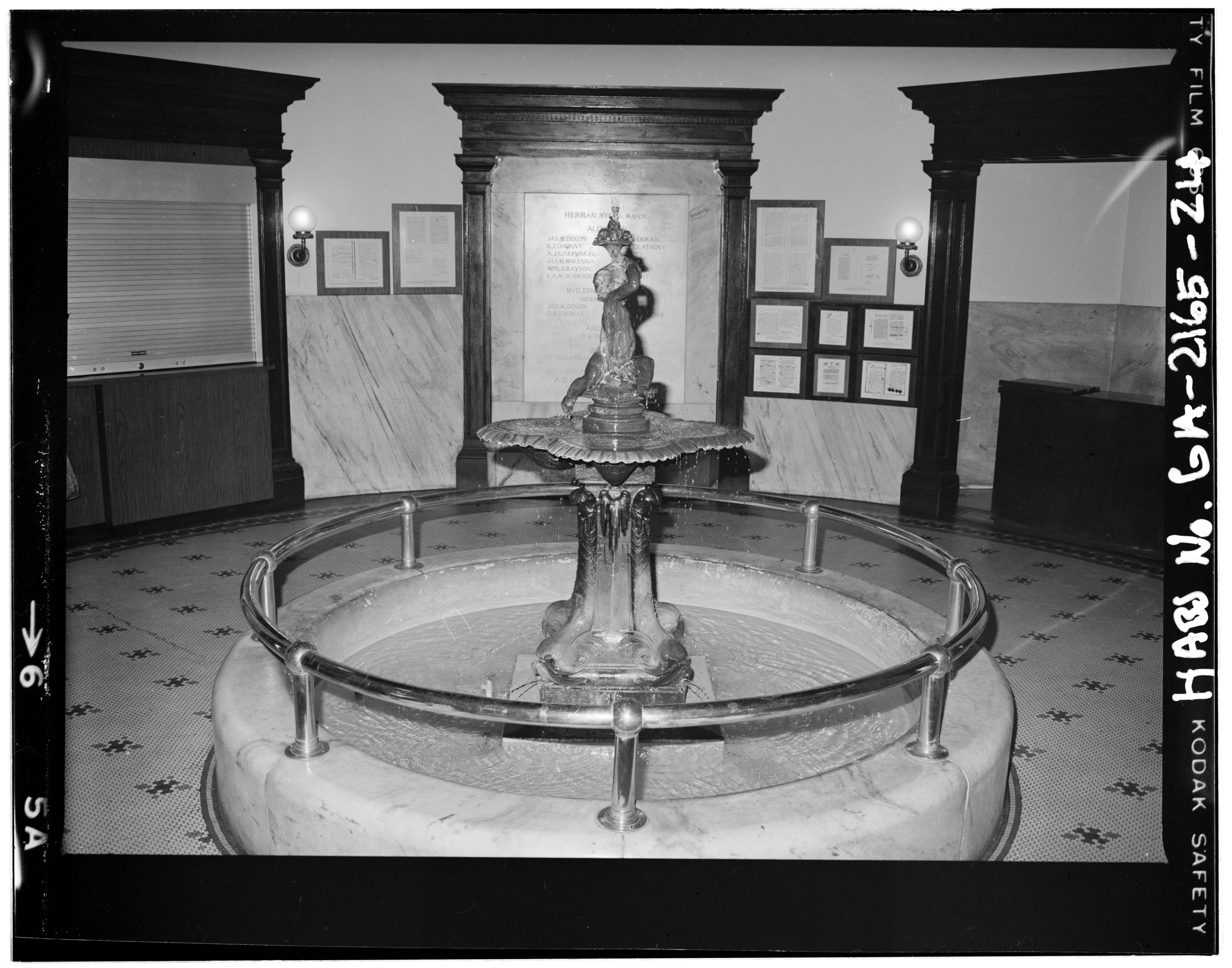
City Hall Fountain (1906), Savannah, Georgia.

== Sources ==
- Theodore Dreiser, "The Sculpture of Fernando Miranda," Ainslee's Magazine 2 (September 1898), pp. 113–18.
