= Sombrero de catite =

Traditional hat of Andalusia, Spain

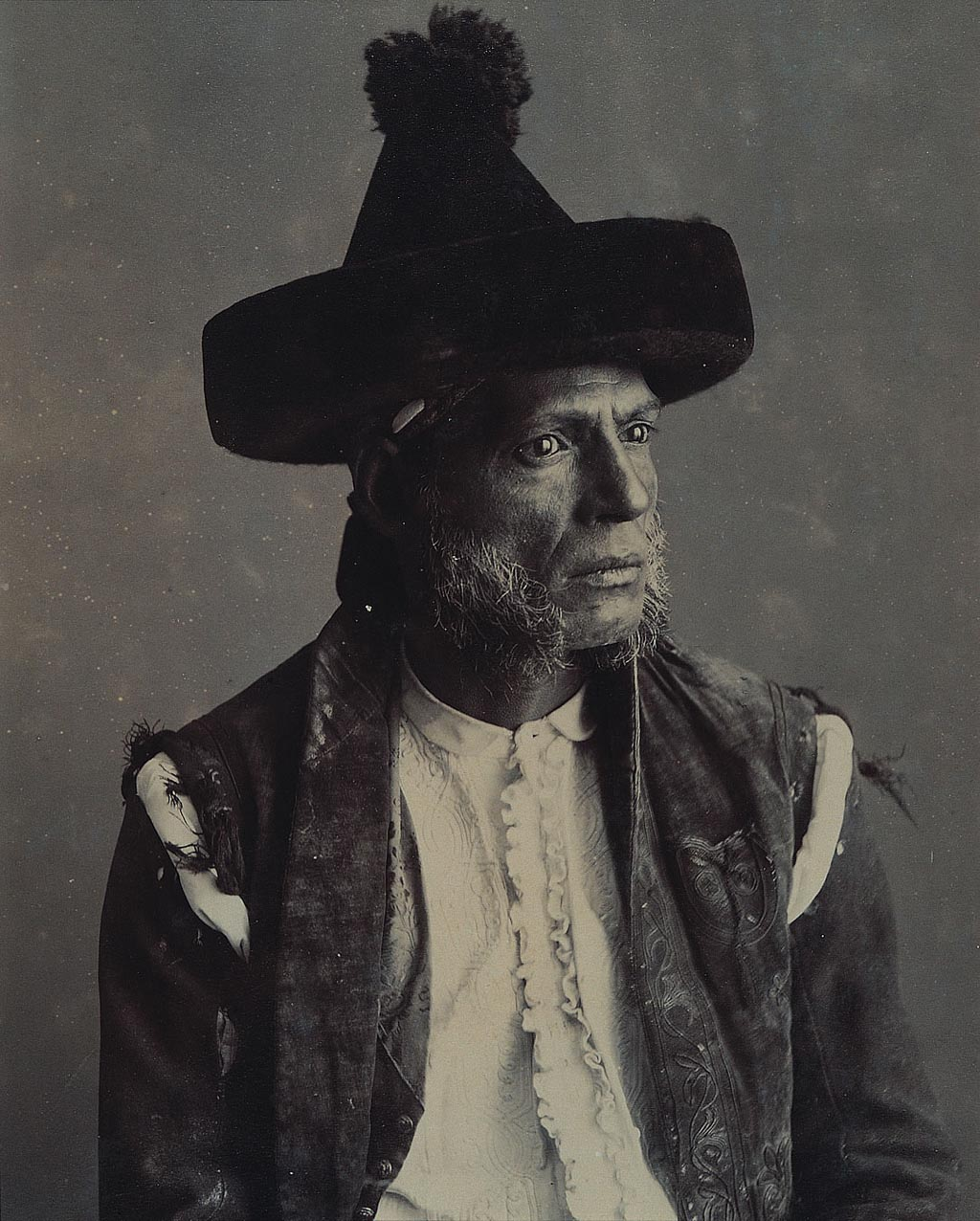
- Type: Hat
- Place of origin: Andalusia, Spain

The sombrero de catite or simply catite is a traditional Andalusian hat, which received its name from a conically shaped sweet.

It is a hat with a high conical crown and a wide brim whose upturned edge forms a rectangular profile.
