= Antonio de Trueba =

Spanish poet, novelist and folklorist

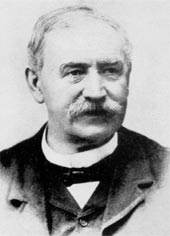
Antonio de Trueba

Antonio de Trueba (24 December 1819 – 10 March 1889) was a Spanish poet, novelist, and folklorist.

== Life ==
He was born in Galdames (at the quarter of Montellano), Biscay, in 1821 (some sources say 1819), where he was privately educated.

In 1835 he went to Madrid to learn business; but commerce was not to his taste, and, after a long apprenticeship, he turned to journalism, hoping to make a livelihood by literary pursuits. To earn his daily bread he discharged the duties of a clerk in a small commercial house, but all the while he beguiled his leisure and his moments of regret by writing little poems and tales redolent of the yearnings and sympathies of a Basque transplanted to the busy cosmopolitan center.

Won over to him by the charm of his writings, Queen Isabella II made him historiographer of the Biscayan district, and he held this post until her flight in 1868. He was reinstated after the restoration.

In 1851 he hit the popular taste with El Cid Campeador and El Libro de los Cantares. His popularity was fixed by the appearance of his first collection of lyrics, the Cantares (Madrid, 1852), and for the next eleven years he was absorbed by journalistic work, the best of his contributions being issued under the titles of Cuentos populares (1862), Cuentos de color de rosa (1864), and Cuentos campesinos (1865). Other collections of his tales, especially charming when they deal with his native region and its people, appeared in 1859, 1860, and 1866. The pleasant simplicity and idyllic sentimentalism of these collections delighted an uncritical public, and de Trueba met the demand by supplying a series of stories conceived in the same ingenious vein.

The 1913 Catholic Encyclopedia considers de Trueba a second-rate writer, but praises the pastoral sentiments of his poetry. His works contributed to the development of the novel of manners in the Spain of the 19th century.

He died at Bilbao.
