= Serafín Estébanez Calderón =

Spanish author (1799–1867)

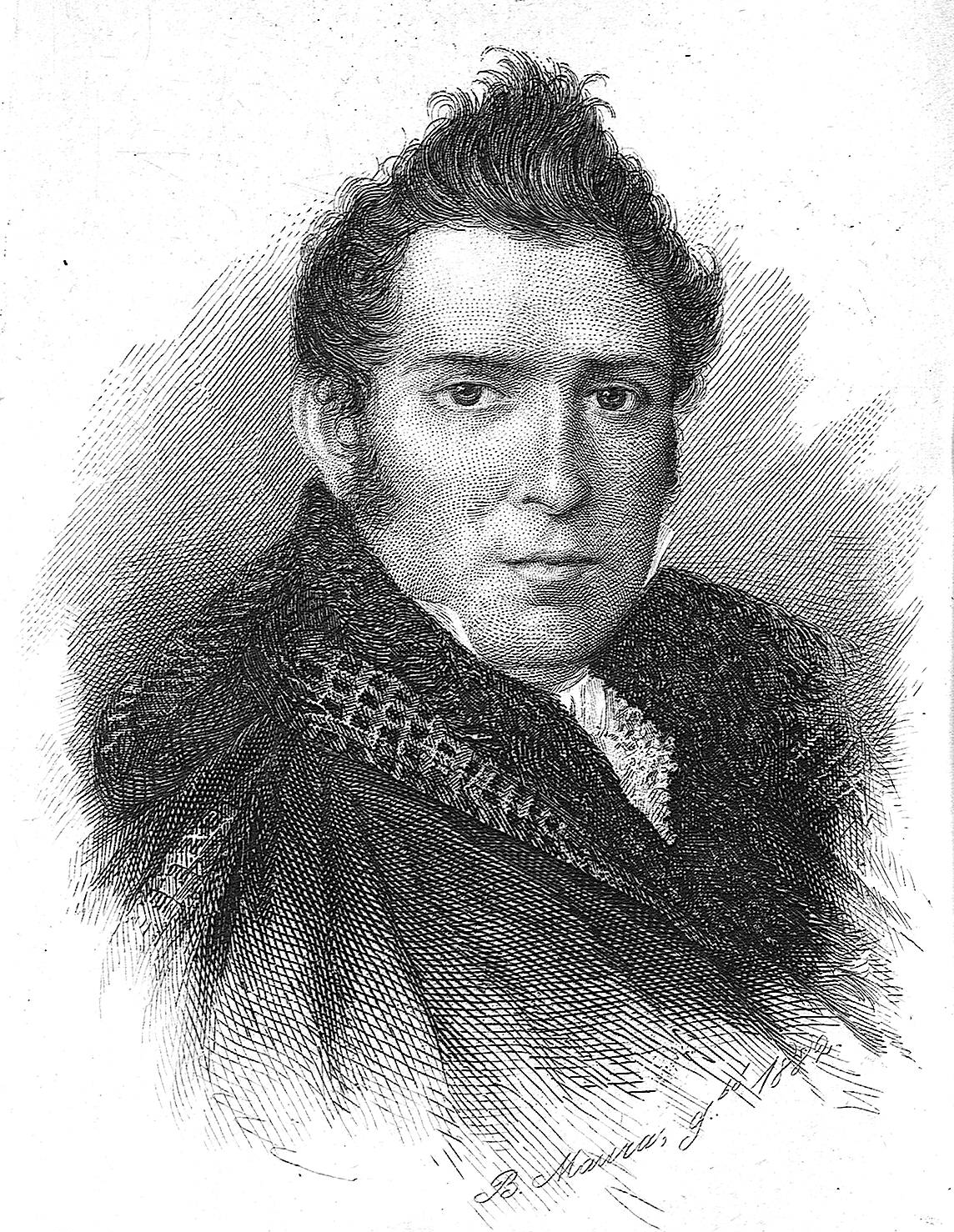
- El Solitario

Deputy of the Cortes Generales for Coín
- In office 8 January 1847 – 2 December 1847

Deputy of the Cortes Generales for Ourense
- In office 1843 – 31 October 1846

Senator of the Cortes Generales (Senator for life)
- In office 1853 – 1867

Personal details
- Born: 27 December 1799 Málaga, Spain
- Died: 5 February 1867 (aged 67) Madrid, Spain
- Occupation: Writer, politician, lawyer, historian & poet
- Nickname: El Solitario

Serafín Estébanez Calderón (27 December 1799 – 5 February 1867) was a Spanish writer, best known by the pseudonym of El Solitario. He was born in Málaga. His first literary effort was El listón verde, a poem signed "Safinio" and written to celebrate the revolution of 1820. He was called to the bar and settled for some time in Madrid, where he published a volume of verses in 1831 under the assumed name of "El Solitario." He obtained an exaggerated reputation as an Arabic scholar, and played a minor part in the political movements of his time. He died in Madrid in 1867. His most interesting work, Escenas andaluzas (1847), is in an affected style, the vocabulary being partly archaic and partly provincial; but, despite its eccentric mannerisms, it is a vivid record of picturesque scenes and local customs. Estébanez Calderón is also the author of an unfinished history, De la conquista y pérdida de Portugal (1883), issued posthumously under the editorship of his nephew, Antonio Cánovas del Castillo.
