= Literary costumbrismo =

Literary costumbrismo is a minor genre of Spanish literature most popular in the 19th century. It is the literary counterpart to the artistic movement known as costumbrismo, which depicted social customs often without analysis or critique. Its style is similar to literary realism. In its most popular and least intellectual form, it describes the commonplace and ordinary aspects of daily life. Appearing in prose and hardly ever in verse, it reached its peak with the novel of manners and in the minor genre called custom picture in journalism. In theater, it manifested in the comedy of manners and sainete, (Note: Theatrical gender that includes funny and popular topics) a continuation of the earlier entremés. (Note: Theatrical gender that includes funny and popular topics that can be written in prose or in verse.)

In England, Richard Steele (1672–1729), who published The Tatler, and Joseph Addison (1672–1719), the co-founder of The Spectator magazine, were costumbrist writers and both of them have been considered the inventors of what they themselves called Essay or Sketch of manners. While costumbrist pieces are meant as popular entertainment, there can often be an undercurrent of criticism or satire beneath the surface.

In the 20th century, the Quintero brothers are noted for their Andalusian costumbrist comedies and Carlos Arniches for his pieces from Madrid. The costumbrist element appears as fundamental in the expressionist painter and writer José Gutiérez Solana, one of the few costumbrist writers who doesn't extol the popular aspects but who shows himself brutally critical in, for example, La España negra (The Black Spain,1920)

== History and origins ==
Categorized as a minor genre in the Spanish literature and the English literature of the 19th century, there are several precedents −3 along the history of the literature- that can be regarded in the use of traditional topics. Its relevance in the context of the 19th century had aimed to be excused as a reaction of the middle class, after the romantic revolution (or even during that time), predicting the possible loss of the traditions and folklore “smashed by the Industrial Revolution". Nevertheless, it was the progress achieved by this revolution the one which would catapult the costumbrismo, as one of his most known representative authors clearly states:

The genre would have never managed to turn enthroned, but helped by the huge literary movement the perfection of the arts was bringing with it: such productions had had neither opportunity nor truth, nor not relying on the aid of the rapidity of the publication. The newspapers were, though, those who made an agreement with the writers of these light pictures of custom, whose success is deserved thanks to the style.

— Mariano José de Larra,

Larra establishes the origin of the modern literature of customs in England since Addison’s The Spectator.

- Another view of the costumbrismo was the new possibility of travelling, a romantic passion that created the literary descriptive model of the libros de viajes (literally, books of traveling), usually more focused on the pictures and hackneyed things and simple impressions or emotions, than critical analysis or ethnographic study

=== Custom pictures ===
The custom picture (also called the articles of customs) was a short sketch-like composition in which the customs, habits, landscapes, amusements and even animals representative of a particular society are relayed, sometimes with the purpose of entertaining (pleasant pictures) and sometimes clearly intended to criticize the society and call for moral reformation. The precedent of Juan de Zabaleta's poetry in the 17th century, led to the 19th century "custom picture" Transido de queja of Mariano Jose de Larras, the most calmed part of Ramon Mesonero Romanos and the Serafín Estébanez Calderón's lyric part. Then, some big collective compilations were written based on these pieces that described types and popular professions, like Los Españoles por sí mismos (The Spaniards by themselves (1843–1844), a collection that contains ninety eight articles of fifty-one authors. Its success gave birth to similar collections:

- El álbum del bello sexo o las mujeres pintadas por sí mismas (The album of the lovely sex or the women painted by themselves) (1843)
- Los cubanos pintados por sí mismos (The Cuban painted by themselves) (1852)
- Los mexicanos pintados por sí mismos (The Mexicans painted by themselves) (1854)
- Los valencianos pintados por sí mismos (The Valencian painted by themselves) (1859)
- Las españolas pintadas por los españoles (The Spanish women painted by the Spanish men) (1871–1872)
- Las mujeres españolas, portuguesas y americanas (The Spanish women, Portuguese women and American women) (1872, 1873, 1876)
- Los españoles de hogaño (This year’s Spaniards) (1872)
- El álbum de Galicia. Tipos, costumbres y leyendas (The album of Galicia. Types, customs and legends) (1897).

=== The novel of Costumbrismo ===
Some studies consider the following novels to be examples of Spanish Costumbrismo during the 19th century: Sotileza (Subtlety), Peñas arriba (Cheer up people) of Jose Maria de Pereda, La gaviota (Seagull) of Fernán Caballero, Pepita Jiménez (Pepita Jiménez) of Juan Valera, La hermana San Sulpicio (Sister San Sulpicio) of Armando Palacio Valdés, and certain passages in Benito Perez Galdós's work. Yet in the 20th century, we find examples like La casa de la Troya or Currito de la Cruz (The house of Troy) of Alejandro Pérez Lugín and the works of Pedro de Répide, among others.

=== The costumbrist comedy ===
The comedy of manners appeared in Spain in the 19th century in hand of Romantic authors like Manuel Eduardo de Gorostiza (Contigo, pan y cebolla) (With you, bread and onion) and Manuel Bretón de los Herreros with important works such as A la vejez, viruelas (To an old age, smallpoxes) (1824), A Madrid me vuelvo ( Going back to Madrid) (1828), El pelo de la dehesa (Pasture's hair) (1837) or Muérete ¡y verás! (Go Ahead and Die, You'll See!) (1840). The formula prospered and at the beginning of the 20th century it became popular in the work of the brothers Serafín and Joaquín Álvarez Quintero and in the sainetes of Carlos Arniches (Del Madrid Castizo) (From pure's Madrid).

=== Costumbrismo in English literature ===
In England, Richard Steele (1672–1729), who published his costumbrist magazine The Tatler, and Joseph Addison (1672–1719), the co-founder of The Spectator magazine, were costumbrist writers and both of them have been considered the inventors of what they themselves called Essay or Sketch of manners.

=== Costumbrismo in French literature ===
The abbé Étienne de Jouy (1764–1846), whose work that notably influenced in the Spanish costumbrist Mariano José de Larra appeared in the Gazette de France between 1811 and 1817, is a representative of the costumbrist genre in the French literature, after the translations of Pierre de Marivaux (1688–1763) and the essays of Louis Sébastien Mercier (1740–1814). Paul-Louis Courier (1772–1825) is less known among the Spaniards but also as important as Jouy.

=== Costumbrismo in Spanish literature ===
One of the features of the Spanish art, especially in its literature, is its tendency towards Realism. This tendency was already evident in the first written text of the Spanish narrative literature that is preserved, Cantar de Mio Cid (The Poem of the Cid), and that is extended through the popular element that impregnates the Libro de Buen Amor (The Book of Good Love), La Celestina (Tragicomedy of Calisto and Melibea), Lazarillo de Tormes (The Life of Lazarillo de Tormes and of His Fortunes and Adversities) or Don Quijote (Don Quixote) itself.

Costumbrismo, as one of the elements that constitute this complicated feature, began to develop in Spain especially in the 17th century because of the popularizing guidelines that come since the Council of Trent and the Counter-Reformation and because of the cultural borderlines closing ordered by the king Philip II of Spain. Thus, popular people and environments that are not presumptuous, and that enable people to identify themselves with a kind of a closer religiosity, are taken as models by painters like Caravaggio. We can see popular types in paintings of Diego Velázquez and Bartolomé Esteban Murillo, and Costumbrism becomes one of the elements that make up satiric literary genres like the picaresque novel and comic literary genres like the entremés. Generally, it is considered that Juan de Zabaleta, Francisco Santos, Antonio Liñán y Verdugo and Bautista Ramiro de Navarra are the first costumbrist baroque writers who specialized in this kind of topics.

In the 18th century, the entremés is transformed into a sainete with such important authors as Ramón de la Cruz, who specialized in a kind of Madrileñismo (from Madrid), and Juan Ignacio González del Castillo, who reproduces types and customs from Cadiz. In the 1700s some painters begin to pay attention to the popular customs and types through fads like Majismo (Kindness). Francisco Goya in his Cartones para tapices, (Note: Collection of paintings painted by Francisco de Goya for the Real Fábrica de Tapices de Santa Bárbara (Royal Tapestry Factory) between 1775 and 1792.) (Cardboards for tapestries) or in his prints about bullfighting, and the Béquer family, with their popular Sevillanas (from Seville) scenes, arrive at create quite a school of painting consecrated to the Andalucian customs, and formed by José Domínguez Bécquer (1805–1841), father of the famous poet Gustavo Adolfo Bécquer (1836–1870) and of the painter Valeriano Bécquer (1833–1870), whose cousin, Joaquín Domínguez Bécquer (1817–1879), was also a costumbrist painter. Furthermore, in the cultural environments Casticismo (literally purity), a tendency to fix a natural, popular and national pattern for the literary style based on the native tradition, was set against the Cosmopolitanism and the frenchification of the Enlightenment.

In the 19th century, that element acquires independence through the subjective element that the Romanticism covers, what makes that the interest in the colectiv or volksgeist (national or popular character) identity be renewed through the Nationalism and the Regionalism, being expressed on purpose in genres like the article or the custom picture, and cultivated in the press and then gathered in individual or collective collections by authors like Sebastián Miñano y Bedoya, Mariano José de Larra, Ramón de Mesonero Romanos and Serafín Estébanez Calderón, among many others, and the novel of manners, but also in the theater through the chico genre (literally, little genre), and it appears as a non depreciable element in the novels of the Realism (Fernán Caballero, José María de Pereda, Benito Pérez Galdós, Emilia Pardo Bazán and Juan Valera.) In the Naturalism Vicente Blasco Ibáñez, who finds an interrelationship in the attractive and dazzling valencian paintings of Joaquín Sorolla, is distinguished for his novels of Valencian ambientation. Another literary genre, the libro de viajes (literally, books of travelling), cultivated by national authors and by foreign authors, is also a son of the curiosity that feels the epoch for everything related to the picturesque customs.

Costumbrismo invades the 19th century zarzuela and a certain type of the teatro por horas heir of the entremés. The born science of the folklore, which studies in a scientific way the popular traditions, deals in compiling, classifying and studying traditional lyric, short stories, coplas, music, games, superstitions and beliefs, sayings, handicraft, gastronomy, ceremonies, rites, folklore, parties, legends, songs, dances and vulgar romances, area in which stand out a few experts like Agustín Durán, Antonio Machado Álvarez, Francisco Rodríguez Marín, Eusebio Vasco and many others. In the literature, this interest in the popular literature is spilled across the so-called Neopopularism of the 19th and 20th centuries. In the 19th it was even written serious literature in dialects like Extremaduran language (José María Gabriel y Galán, Luis chamizo), Asturian language or even the Murcian language.

In the 20th century stand out Quintero brothers for their Andalusian costumbrist comedies and Carlos Arniches for his pieces from Madrid; the costumbrist element appears as fundamental in the expressionist painter and writer José Gutiérez Solana, one of the few costumbrist writers who doesn't extol the popular aspects and who shows himself brutally critic in, for example, La España negra (The black Spain) (1920), against the obliging paintings by Julio Romero de Torres (however, expressionists in essence) or more balanced by Ignacio Zuloaga; nevertheless, since the Civil War, this Costumbrismo involutes as it is identified with the superficial and uncritical picturesqueness of the European travellers to Spain from the 19th century and with an Andalusian (from Andalusia) impoverishing reductionism that was good to the economic necessity of promote the Tourism, especially in the cinema, where this type of products became known as españoladas. Nevertheless, some prewar and postwar authors headed by Ramón Gómez de la Serna (Elucidario de Madrid, El Rastro) (Explanation of Madrid, The Track) are saved because they follow the 19th century tradition of the Sketch of manners. This group revolves around the so-called Madrileñismo (from Madrid), like Eusebio Blasco (1844–1903), Pedro de Répide (1882–1947), Emiliano Ramírez Ángel (1883–1928), Luis Bello or, in the postwar, Federico Carlos Sainz de Robles. As for the Andalucismo (meaning in English Andalusian literary expression), the deep 19th century vein is renewed by writers like José Nogales (1860–1908), Salvador Rueda (1857–1933), Arturo Reyes (1864–1913) and others. The Costumbrismo of the called Generation of ‘98 has more value and shaded dyes, and looks in its trips the real Spain opposite the official Spain: Miguel de Unamuno writes De mi país (From my country) (1903), Pio Baroja his Vitrina pintoresca (Odd display cabinet (1935), receiving in his Basque (from the Basque Country in Spain) trilogies, customs of that region, as in his etchings and literature his brother Ricardo Baroja; Azorín appears to the Castilian (from Castile in Spain) and Andalusian scenery (Los pueblos, Alma española, Madrid. Guía sentimental...) (The villages, Spanish Souls, Madrid. Sentimental Guide). Hereinafter, only authors like Camilo José Cela, seems to have counted with the costumbrista element, who is the creator of a new type of Sketch of manners, the esbozo carpetovetónico, near to the esperpento, and authors like Francisco Candel, Ramón Ayerra or Francisco Umbral, the last one is the author of a type of anti-burgues Costumbrismo with a radiant style.

== Literary Costumbrismo in Latin America ==
The costumbrist novel had a special repercussion in some countries. In Mexico or in Colombia for example, Costumbrismo influenced non-costumbrist novels. An example is the sentimental novel María, by Jorge Isaacs. Due to him, the article of customs, very popular and with wide dissemination, recreated sketches of manners of pure localism in his types and language, emphasis on the approach of the picturesque, occasionally container of a satire and social criticism with intention of reform, and other times almost photographic reproductions of the reality (sometimes with very raw scenes and rough, even rude, vocabulary.) The American costumbrist work usually abounded in local details, in its desire to reflect reality as faithfully as possible.

== Bibliography ==
- Fernández Montesinos, José (1960). Costumbrismo y novela. Ensayo sobre el redescubrimiento de la realidad española. Estudios sobre la novela española del siglo XIX; 2. Castalia.
