= Artistic and Monumental Spain =

1842 book

España Artística y Monumental
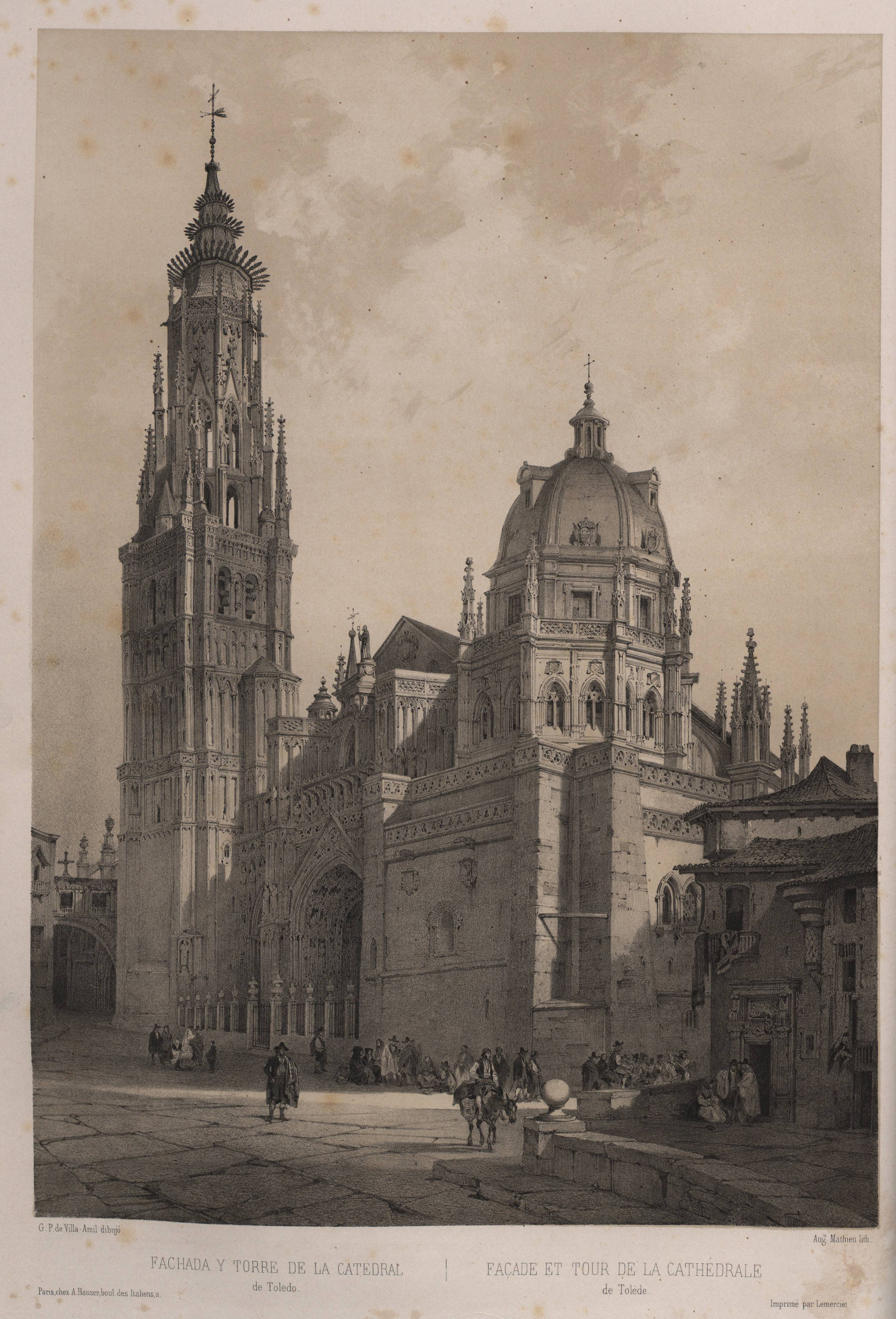
- Fachada y torre de la catedral de Toledo; Facade and tower of the Cathedral of Toledo
- Original title: España Artística y Monumental
- Illustrator: Jenaro Pérez Villaamil and others
- Language: Spanish
- Genre: Travel book
- Published: 1842
- Publisher: Veith and Hauser

Artistic and Monumental Spain (Spanish: España Artística y Monumental) is an illustrated travel book in 3 volumes, including significant structures and monuments in Spain. It was published in 1842 in Paris by Veith and Hauser. The illustrator was Jenaro Pérez Villaamil in collaboration with Patricio de la Escosura, who was responsible for the text. His patron or sponsor was the Gaspar Remisa.

== History ==
The work was created by a collaboration of writer Patricio de la Escosura, with lithographer Louis-Julien Jacottet (1806–1880), and the artist Jenaro Pérez Villaamil who also acted as editor.

Illustrated travel books of this type became popular during Romantic movement of the 19th century. España Artística y Monumental was one of the most beautiful works in this genre works along España pintoresca y artística (Francisco de Paula Van Halen) and Recuerdos y bellezas de España (Francisco Javier Parcerisa with José María Quadrado).

Most of the illustrated plates were done by Villaamil, many of them drawn from his own paintings; in these cases the illustration included his signature at the bottom «<GP de Villaamil pinxit>». Other artists also contributed including his brother Juan, Valentín Carderera, José Domínguez Bécquer, and Cecilio Pizarro.

Some parts of the work was created from original drawings purchased from other artists. In some cases the author's name is recorded on the illustration, else it is simply reads «G. Pérez de Villaamil lo dirigió». This happened to Valentin Cardedera's illustration causing him to write a letter of complaint to Villaamil:

He visto con sentimiento que entre las últimas estampas de la España Monumental, que han salido algunas cuyos originales vendí a Vd., está suprimido mi nombre. Lo propio sucede, como ya dije a Vd., con la catedral de Zamora. La Magdalena de Zamora [...] En estas últimas que han salido falta mi nombre [...]
I have seen with feeling among the last prints of Spain Monumental, which came out some original which sold it to you., My name is deleted. The same thing happens, as I said to you., With the Cathedral of Zamora. Magdalena de Zamora [...] In the latter who have gone missing my name [...]

— Valentín Carderera

== Description ==
The whole work has a romantic tinge in line with contemporary European works. The illustrations echoed Pérez Villamil's style which celebrated a romantic medieval aspect. The Paris publishing house Hauser published the work between 1842 and 1850 in three volumes - around twenty French and one Spanish lithographer worked on the plates. Despite the variety of authors and lithographers, the whole had a consistent style thanks to the good direction Pérez Villamil with the lithographers allowed to use interpretive licenses when working from the originals.

The work contains 44 views of Toledo, 19 of Burgos, as well as illustrations of various places of Castile, Aragon, Andalusia, the Basque Country, Navarre, and Galicia. The choice was arbitrary and did not represent all regions of Spain.
