= Joaquín Espín y Guillén =

Spanish composer and musician

- Born: 3 May 1812
- Died: 24 June 1882 (aged 70)
- Known for: pioneer of zarzuela
- Spouse: Josefa Pérez Colbrand

Joaquín Espín y Guillén (3 May 1812, Velilla de Medinaceli, Soria – 24 June 1882, Madrid) was a Spanish composer and musician. He is known as a pioneer of zarzuela.

== Life ==
Joaquín Espín y Guillén was born on 3 May 1812 in Velilla de Medinaceli, Soria to Joaquín Espin y Beltrán and Josefa Guillén e Igual. He spend his early years with his paternal grandparents in Cuzcurrita, La Rioja, and later with his parents. Espín studied music theory and organ with José Aramburu, organist of the Cathedral of Santo Domingo de la Calzada, and later moved to Burgos where he continued his training with the organists Vicente Pueyo and Ciriaco Olave. In 1831 Espín went to Bordeaux, France, where for nine month he was trained by the pianist Hoffmann. After returning from France Espín passed the examination as organist in Santo Domingo de la Calzada, and in 1833 moved to Madrid to continue his studies entering the Royal Conservatory of Music and Declamation. While studying in Madrid Espín started giving singing and piano classes.

On 29 January 1836, he married Josefa Pérez Colbrand, a niece of Rossini´s first wife, singer Isabella Colbran. The couple had four children: Joaquín who became a well-known conductor, Julia who became a prima donna and a muse of Gustavo Adolfo Bécquer, as well as less known Josefina and Ernestina.

== Career ==
Between 1838 and 1842, Espín was a President of the Music Section of the Artistic Lyceum, and from 1841 to 1845 he was a teacher at the Matritense Museum. He also held a position of Vice President of the Music Section at the Spanish Institute for two years.

On 2 January 1842, Espín founded the first Spanish musical newspaper La Iberia Musical. For five years until 1846, Espín was its director, owner and main contributor.

In late 1845, Espín went to Bologna at Rossini's request to fix the testament of the Rossini's first wife Isabel Colbrand, and there Espín had an opportunity to meet Giuseppe Verdi. In October 1847, Espín founded an association Círculo Filarmónico that offered an alternative musical training to that of the Madrid Conservatory.

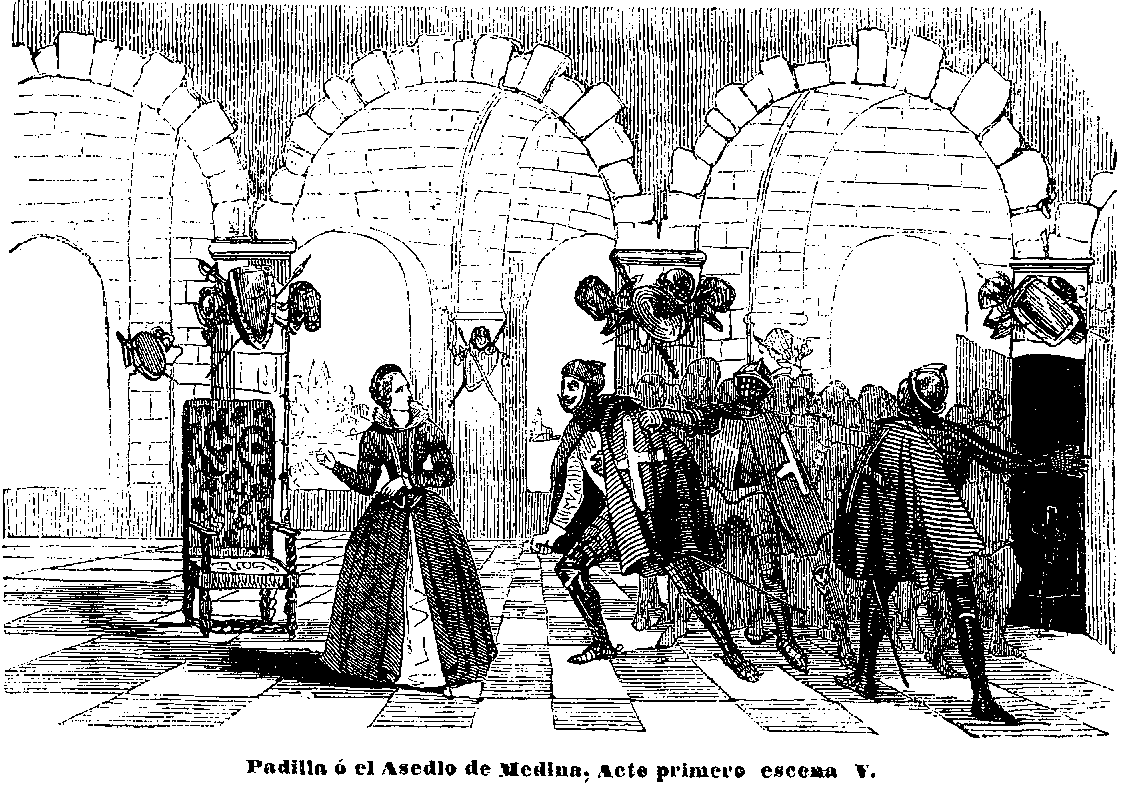
Joaquín Espín y Guillén - Padilla - act 1, scene 5

In 1851, he was a choirmaster and director of the military bad of the Royal Theater. Espín was also a president of Matritense Philharmonic Academy.

From 1851 to 1855, Espín collaborated with Ramón Mesonero Romanos and Pedro Madrano writing articles on music for Modern Encyclopedia at the initiative of Francisco de Paula Mellado.

In 1853, Espín raised an instance to Queen Isabella II to request a creation of a music section in the National Library, but the request was denied. Espín wrote his first zarzuela Carlos Broschi that was premiered in the San Fernando Theater in Seville on 12 February 1854 and was staged until 1856. His second zarzuela El encogido y el estirado was premiered at the Teatro del Circo on 14 March 1857.

In the 1850s, Espín composed four zarzuelas, considering this new genre a great possible way to create the national opera. From May 1862 Espín served as organist in the Royal Chapel, and from 1865 to 1867 he was a choirmaster at the Royal Theater. After the reform of the Madrid Conservatory, he was appointed a professor by Royal Order on 20 June 1868.

From January 1869 Espín was in charge of writing “Revistas musicales” for La Iberia, and until August 1872 collaborated with Diario Politico. For almost four years from August 1878 to February 1881, he collaborated with La Politica writing chronicles and music criticism. In February 1882 Espín returned to work as professor of solfeggio at the Madrid Conservatory.

Joaquín Espín y Guillén died on 24 June 1882 in Madrid.
