= José Domínguez Bécquer =

Spanish painter (1805–1841)

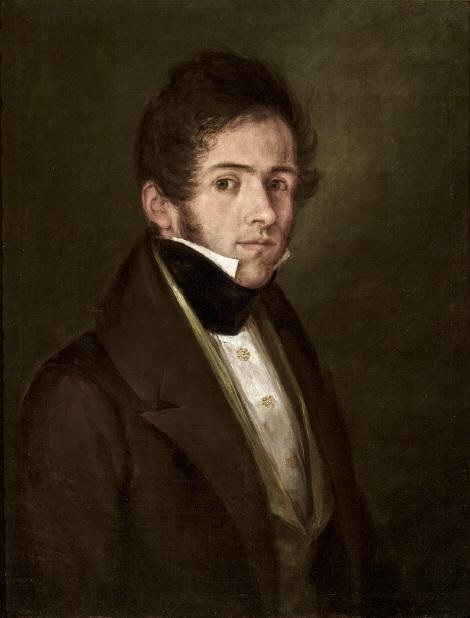
José Domínguez Bécquer (c.1830); by Antonio María Esquivel

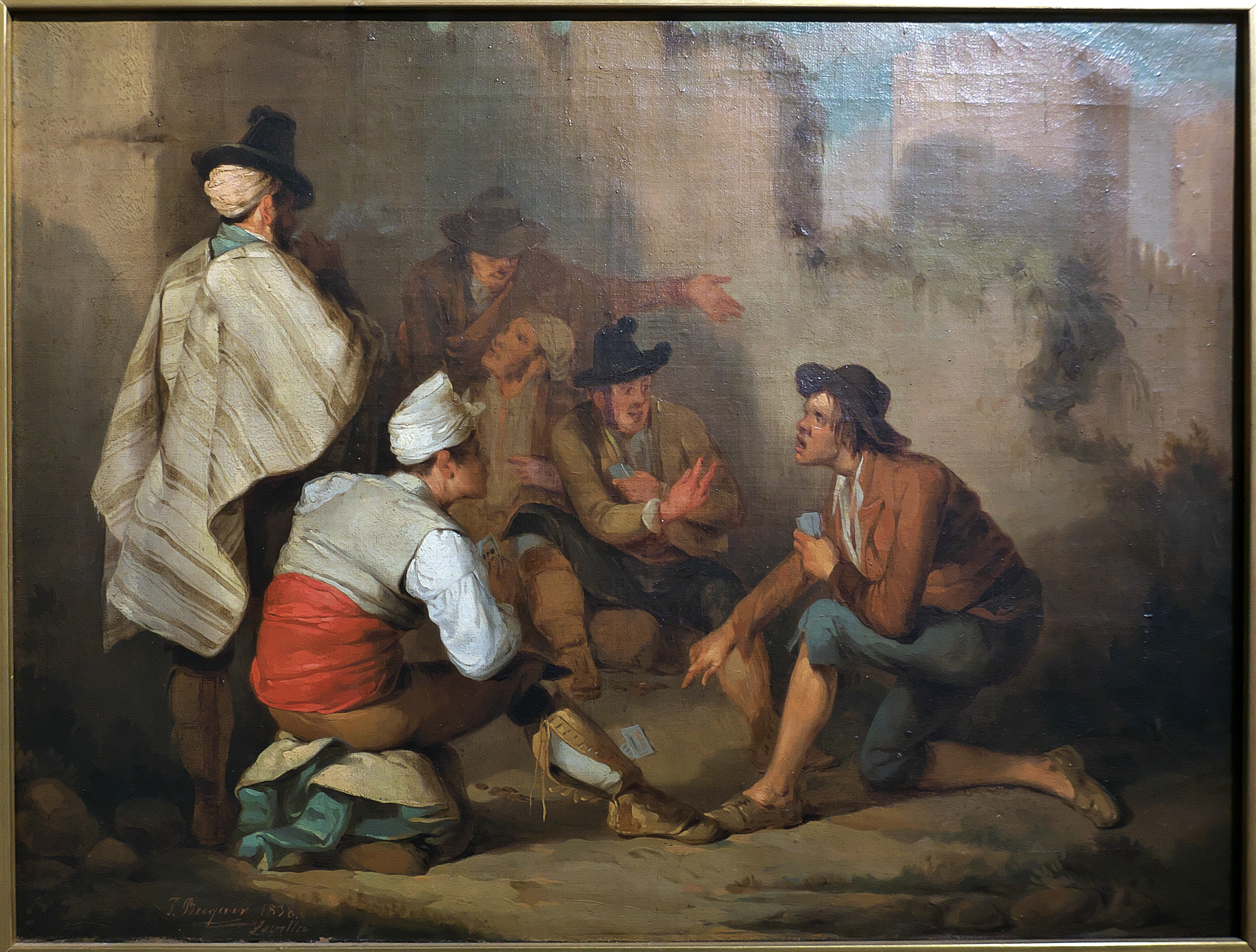
The Game of Cards (1838)

José María Domínguez Insausti, better known as José Domínguez Bécquer (22 January 1805, Seville - 28 January 1841, Seville) was a Spanish painter in the Costumbrismo style. He was the father of the famous poet, Gustavo Adolfo Bécquer, and the painter Valeriano Bécquer.

== Biography ==
He was descended from an old Flemish family, that had been established in Seville since the 16th century. Originally very wealthy, by the 18th century they had lost their fortune and fame, but retained their noble pride. His parents were Antonio Domínguez Bécquer and María Antonia Insausti, from Lucena. Later, José would adopt the name Bécquer, in preference to Insausti, as a way of recognizing his family's origins.

He studied art at the Escuela de Tres Nobles Artes, where he became lifelong friends with his fellow student, Antonio María Esquivel. When he married Joaquina Bastida y Vargas in 1827, Esquivel served as his best man. They had eight children, including the aforementioned Valeriano and Gustavo. His namesake, José, was born in 1841, after his death.

In 1830, he became associated with the Academia de Bellas Artes de Sevilla and established his own studio. From 1837 to 1841, he kept a meticulous record of everything associated with the studio. He socialized with the British painters who visited Spain, such as David Roberts and John Frederick Lewis, and many of his works were sent to England from Cádiz, with the assistance of the Consul there, John MacPherson Brackenbury (1778-1847). It was often said that his works were better known in England than in Spain.

He died suddenly, of undisclosed causes, aged only thirty-six. His cousin, Joaquín, who had lived with them and been an assistant in the studio, became Valeriano's guardian.

He was one of the many artists who contributed illustrations for Artistic and Monumental Spain, a three-volume travel book, under the direction of Jenaro Pérez Villaamil, which was published in 1842.
