= Julia Espín y Pérez de Collbrand =

Spanish opera singer

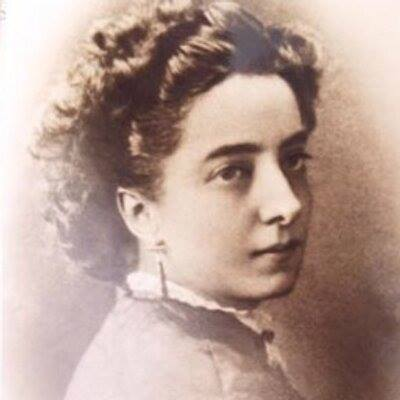

Background information
- Born: 18 November 1838; Madrid, Spain
- Died: 20 December 1906 (aged 68)
- Genres: opera singer, soprano
- Years active: 1856–1869

Julia Espín y Pérez de Collbrand (18 November 1838, Madrid – 20 December 1906, Soprano) was a Spanish opera singer, daughter of a composer Joaquín Espín y Guillén and sister of a composer Joaquín Espín y Pérez Colbran. She is especially known for being the muse of the Spanish poet Gustavo Adolfo Bécquer.

== Early life ==
Julia Espín was born on 18 November 1838 in Madrid. She belonged to a family with a great musical tradition. Her father, Joaquín Espín y Guillén, was a director of the choirs of the Teatro Real and her mother, Josefina Pérez, was the niece of the singer Isabella Colbran, first wife of the famous composer Gioachino Rossini. Espín was the first of three daughters and received her first musical lessons from her father. Her father considered that musical training offered by Madrid Conservatory was excessively oriented towards the Italian operatic canon and lacked comprehensive education for future Spanish lyrical singers and composers. Espín's first performances as a singer took place in Círculo Filarmónico, an association founded by her father.

== Career ==
In 1856, at the age of eighteen, Espín was invited to sing for Queen Isabella II. In 1858 Espín wrote to Queen Isabella II requesting royal protection to carry out her career as a singer. However, she unlike her brother Joaquín, who was granted a training at the Imperial Conservantory of Music and Declamation in Paris, didn't obtain the protection of the monarch.

Most likely, through a mutual friend Ramón Rodríguez Correa Espín met a poet Gustavo Adolfo Bécquer. She became his muse while keeping in touch through the artistic-literary gathering in Espín's family house. Espín became protagonist of some of the Bécquer's verses of “Rimas” (“Rhymes”). Additionally Bécquer presented Espín two albums with poems and drawings of her that is now kept in the National library of Spain in Madrid.

In 1866 Espín, recommended by her uncle composer Gioachino Rossini, deputed as soprano at the Teatro de La Scala in Milan with the premiere of the opera Turanda, composed specially for her by Antonio Bazzini. Espín adopted a stage name Giuletta Collbrand. She was awarded the third prize of the contest organized by La Gazetta Musicale di Milano.

In the first half of 1868 Espín sang Il Barbiere again at the Teatro Bellini in Palermo, played roles of Desdemona, Margarita, Leonora and Leila in Otello, La Favorite, Faust and L 'Ebreo, respectively. In summer 1868 she went to Russia where she was hired to sing in the imperial theaters for 8 month. Espín deputed at the Novgorod Opera House and Odessa Opera and Ballet Theater.

In September 1869 Espín was hired to sing in Moscow and Saint Petersburg. It is also known that she performed in Paris for some time. In December 1869 Espín had to return to Madrid due to her throat condition and after that she never sang again abroad or within the country.

In 1873 Espín married Benigno Quiroga, who was elected a deputy for the province of Lugo and served as Minister of the Interior during the reign of Alfonso XII. They had three children: Jose, Luis and Joaquín.

Julia Espín died of bronchopneumonia on 20 December 1906 at the age of 68. She was buried in the Quiroga family pantheon next to the Romanesque church of San Pedro Fiz de Hospital.
