= Valeriano Bécquer =

Spanish painter (1833–1870)

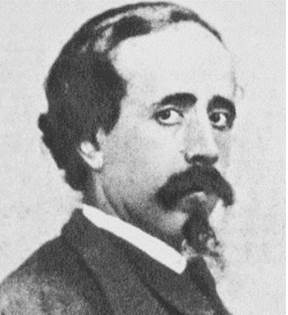
Valeriano Domínguez Bécquer (1863)

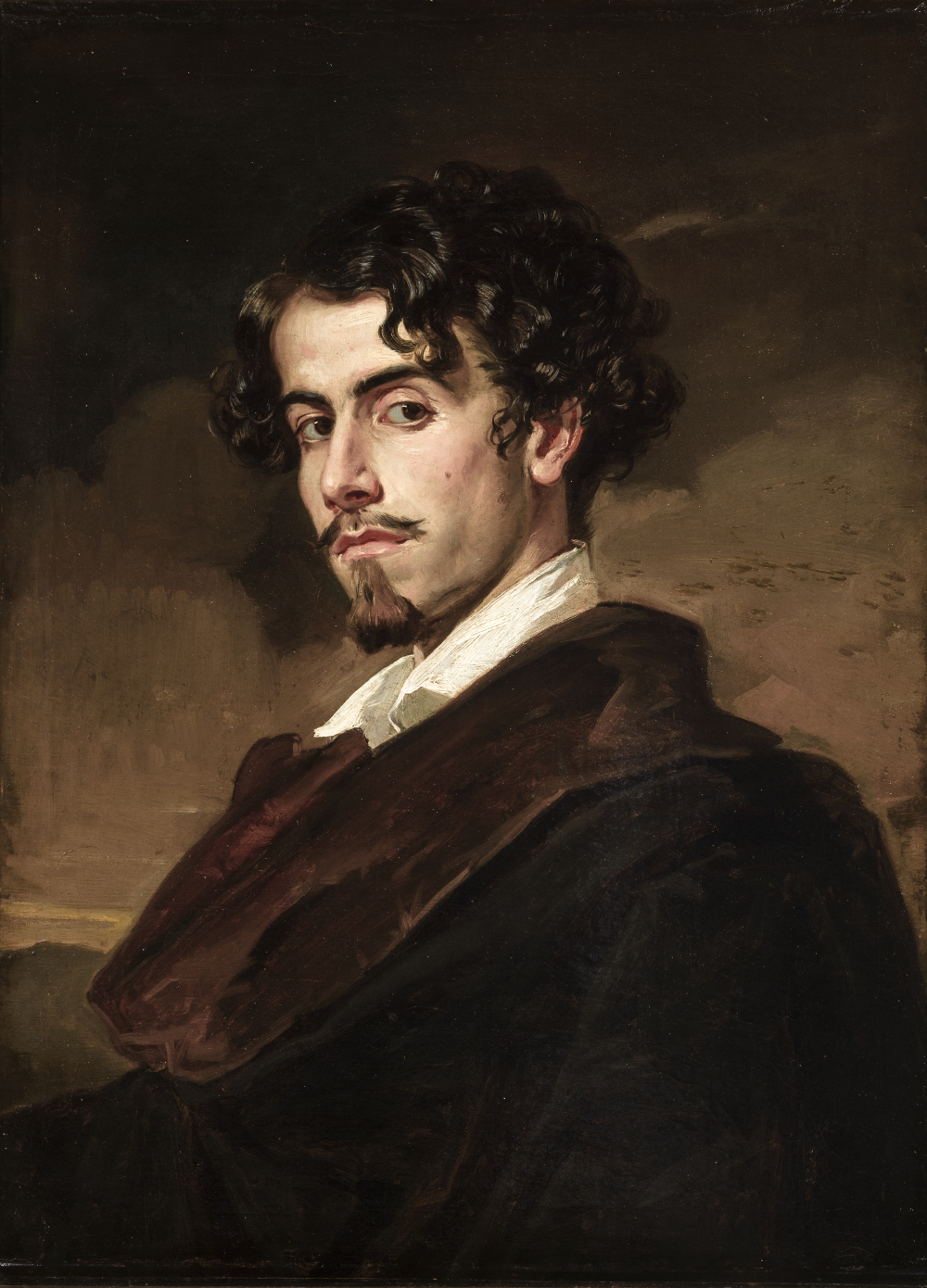
Portrait of his brother Gustavo (1862)

Valeriano Domínguez Bécquer (15 December 1833 – 23 September 1870) was a Spanish painter and graphic artist, who often worked in the costumbrismo style.

== Biography ==
He was born in Seville. His father, José Domínguez Bécquer, was also a painter and his younger brother was the poet Gustavo Adolfo Bécquer. His first art lessons came from his father, who died when Valeriano was only eight. Afterwards, he was raised by his mother's family and took lessons from his uncle Joaquín Domínguez Bécquer, assisting in his workshop until 1853. Later, he also studied with Antonio Cabral Bejarano.

His brief marriage to the daughter of an Irish seaman failed in 1862, after producing two children, and he followed his brother to Madrid. In 1865, he received a government commission to paint scenes of festivals, costumes and customs from the various Spanish regions, which resulted in several years of travelling. The project was left unfinished, however, when the Glorious Revolution resulted in the grant for his commission being withdrawn. To supplement his income, he worked as a cartoonist and illustrator for several publications, including La Ilustración Española y Americana and El Museo Universal, often in conjunction with Gustavo.

A series of pornographic satirical drawings, Los Borbones en Pelota (playing in private), by "SEM" have been attributed to him and his brother, but some researchers believe they are actually the work of Francisco Ortego Vereda, a radical opponent of the Royalists. They were privately distributed at first, and not published until 1991.

He died of liver disease in Madrid, aged 36, just three months before his brother. In fact, Gustavo's death may have been hastened by this event, as he fell into a deep depression afterward and his health had always been fragile. Valeriano's portrait of Gustavo was used on the 100 Peseta Spanish banknote from 1965 to 1970 and was the model for a memorial bust in Maria Luisa Park.
