= Joaquín Domínguez Bécquer =

Spanish painter (1817–1879)

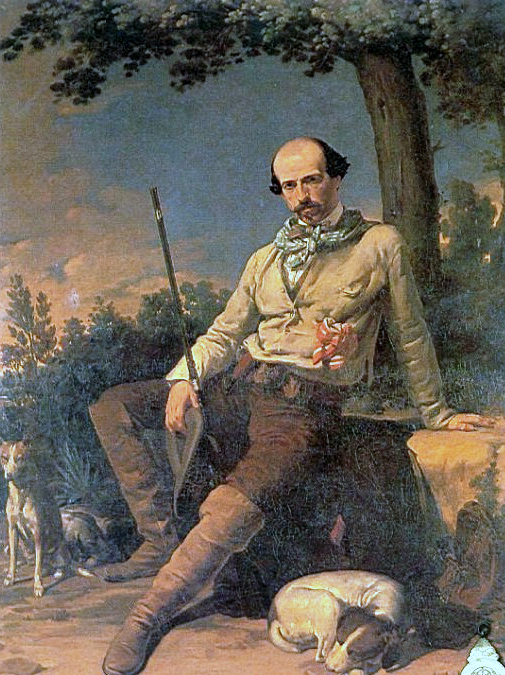
Self-portrait (c. 1860)

Joaquín Domínguez Bécquer (25 September 1817, Seville – 26 July 1879, Seville) was a Spanish Costumbrista painter.

== Biography ==
His family was originally from the Spanish Netherlands, and their name was "Becker". He studied in his hometown at the Academia de Bellas Artes with his cousin, the painter José Domínguez Bécquer. Later, he would become a teacher there, and a full member in 1847. When José Domínguez died, in 1841, Joaquín became the guardian of his son, Valeriano, who would also become a painter.

His first major commission came from the court of Queen Isabella II to direct the artistic work being done on the occasion of the restoration of the Alcázar of Seville. This earned him the honorary title of Court Painter, and he was appointed Master of Drawing for the Queen's nephews; the sons of Luisa Fernanda de Borbón and Antoine de Orleans.

He was a renowned exponent of the Costumbrista style, with Sevillian themes; many of which may be seen at the Museum of Romanticism in Madrid and the Carmen Thyssen Museum in Málaga.

He also did portraits, urban landscapes, and historical scenes; notably a large canvas depicting the Treaty of Wad Ras, which is displayed in the headquarters of the City Council of Seville. Several works may also be seen at the Museo del Prado. Much of his work, however, remains in private collections.

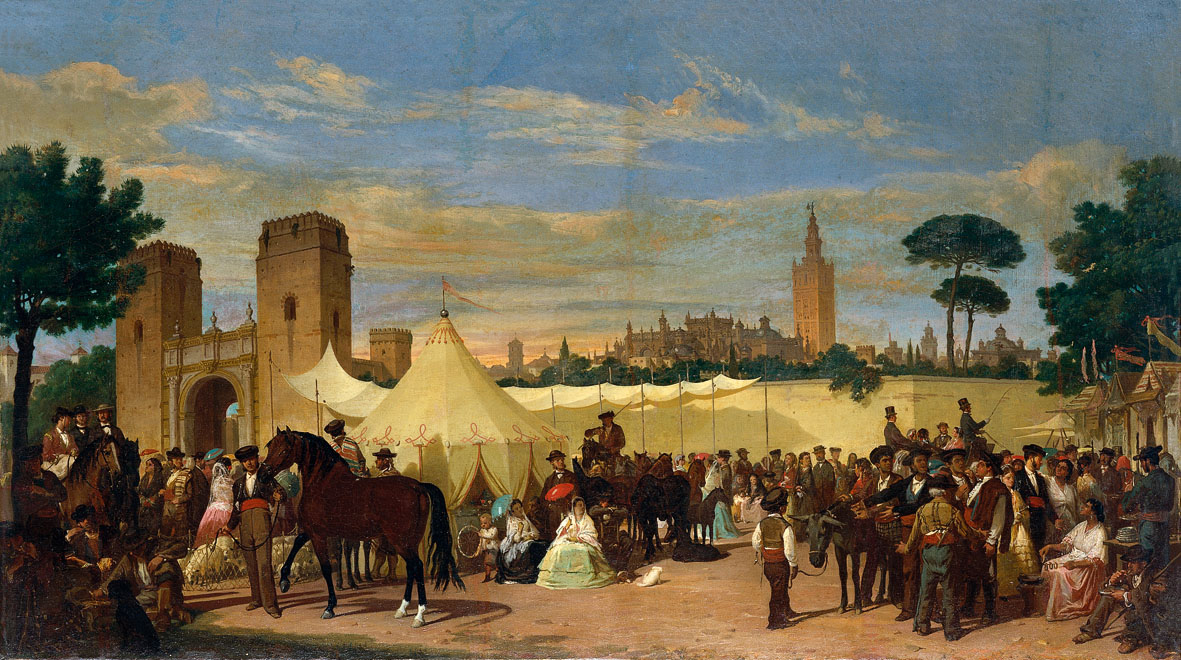
The Fair in Seville
