= Romance literature =

Romance literature may refer to:

- Chivalric romance, a style of heroic prose and verse narrative current in Europe from the Middle Ages to the Renaissance
- Romance novel, a literary genre developed in Western culture which focuses on the romantic relationship between two or more people
- Romance (prose fiction), a type of novel
- Literature of Romanticism, a movement from the 18th century away from neoclassicism and emphasizing the imagination and emotions, with English Romanticism emphasizing sensibility, autobiography, external nature, melancholy, the primitive, the common man, and the remote.
- Literature in the Romance languages
