= Gustavo Adolfo Bécquer =

Spanish poet and writer (1836–1870)

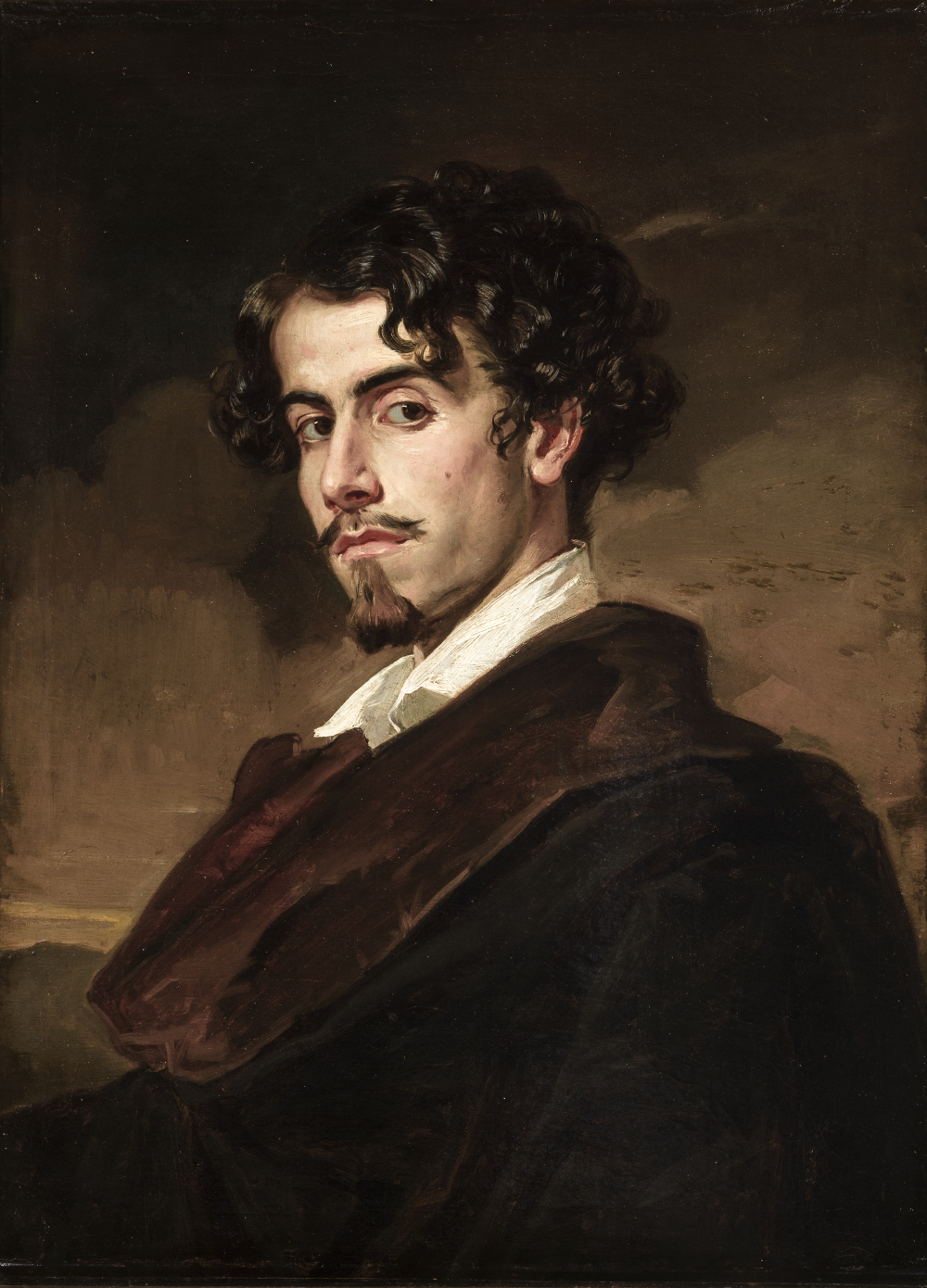
- Gustavo Adolfo Bécquer by his brother, Valeriano Bécquer
- Born: Gustavo Adolfo Domínguez Bastida; 17 February 1836; Seville, Spain
- Died: 22 December 1870 (aged 34); Madrid, Spain
- Occupations: Poet, writer, journalist

Gustavo Adolfo Claudio Domínguez Bastida (17 February 1836 – 22 December 1870), better known as Gustavo Adolfo Bécquer (Spanish pronunciation: [ɡusˈtaβo aˈðolfo ˈβekeɾ]), was a Spanish Romantic poet and writer (mostly short stories), also a playwright, literary columnist, and talented in drawing. He is one of the most important figures in Spanish literature, with some considering him the most read Spanish writer after Miguel de Cervantes. He adopted the alias of Bécquer as his brother Valeriano Bécquer, a painter, had done earlier. He was associated with the romanticism and post-romanticism movements and wrote while realism enjoyed success in Spain. He was moderately well-known during his life, but it was after his death that most of his works were published. His best-known works are the Rhymes and the Legends, usually published together as Rimas y leyendas. These poems and tales are essential to studying Spanish literature and common reading for high-school students in Spanish-speaking countries.

His work approached the traditional poetry and themes in a modern way, and he is considered the founder of modern Spanish lyricism. Bécquer's influence on 20th-century poets of the Spanish language can be felt in the works of Luis Cernuda, Octavio Paz, Giannina Braschi, Antonio Machado, and Juan Ramón Jiménez. Bécquer himself was influenced – both directly and indirectly — by Cervantes, Shakespeare, Goethe, and Heinrich Heine.

== Biography ==
Gustavo Adolfo Bécquer was born in 1836, in Sevilla, Spain, with the last name of Domínguez Bastida, but he chose his Flemish father's second last name of Bécquer, as the family was known around town. His father, José Domínguez Bécquer, who descended from an originally-Flemish family established in the Andalusian capital in the 16th century that was well respected in the city, was a painter of relatively good repute in his native town. His paintings were sought after, particularly among tourists visiting the area. José had a great talent, and this greatly influenced young Gustavo, who showed a love for painting and an innate ability for drawing and sketching at an early age. He was very talented, and continued drawing throughout his life, though it was never his main focus.

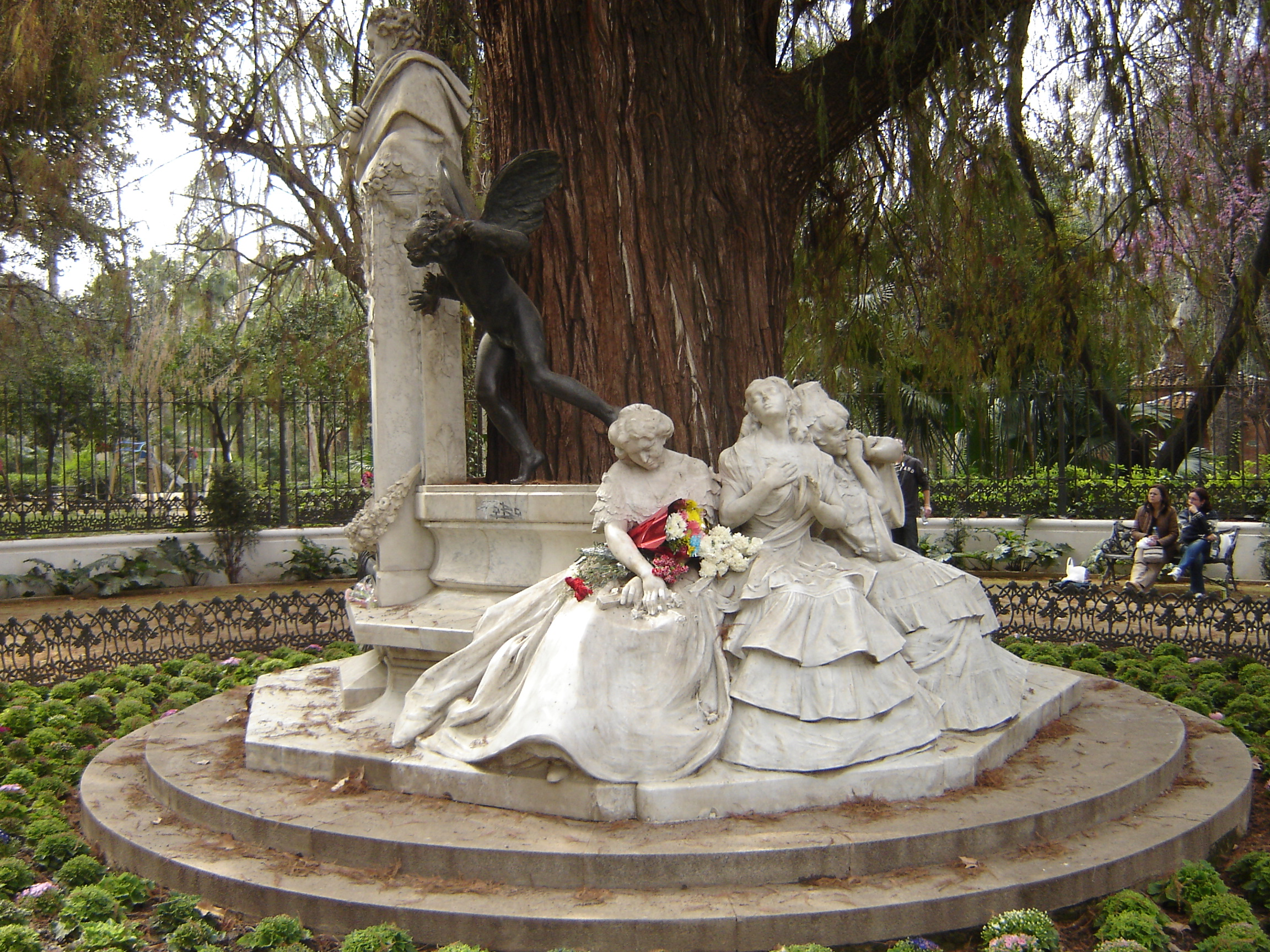
Glorieta de Bécquer in Seville, Spain

Bécquer was left an orphan at an early age: he lost his father at age 5, and his mother only 6 years later. Young Gustavo began his education at San Antonio Abad school, until he was admitted as a student of San Telmo school in 1846, a nautical institution. It was at that school where he met Narciso Campillo, with whom he built a strong friendship. It was also with Campillo that Bécquer began to show his literary vocation, as the two boys started writing while sharing time at San Telmo. A year later, the school was closed by royal order. Gustavo and his siblings were then taken in by their uncle, Don Juan de Vargas, who cared for the children as if they were his own. Shortly after, Gustavo went on to live with his godmother, Doña Manuela Monahay, whose extensive library provided young Bécquer with endless hours of entertainment, which Doña Manuela allowed with pleasure. During this period, Campillo remembers that the poet barely left his godmother's house, as he spent hours devouring the volumes of her library. Gustavo's godmother, a well-educated person and also well-to-do, supported his passion for study of the arts and history. However, she wanted Gustavo to have a profession, so in 1850 she got him admitted as a pupil into the studio of Don Antonio Cabral Bejarano, at the Santa Isabel de Hungría school. Gustavo worked at the studio for only two years, when he moved to his uncle Joaquin's studio and continued developing his skills alongside his brother Valeriano, who was already studying there. Gustavo and Valeriano became from this point very close friends, and they both influenced each other greatly throughout their lives. Luciano, another brother of the poet, also studied with them during this period. Studying the art of drawing did not distract Gustavo from his passion for poetry; furthermore, his uncle Joaquin paid for his Latin classes, which brought him closer to his beloved Horace, one of his earliest influences. Joaquin also noticed the great aptitude of his nephew for words, and encouraged him to pursue writing as a career, contrary to the designs of Doña Manuela, with whom Gustavo was still living at the time.

In 1853, at the age of seventeen, he moved to Madrid to follow his dream of making a name for himself as a poet. Along with his friends Narciso Campillo and Julio Nombela, both poets also, they had dreamed of moving to Madrid together and selling their poetry for good money, though reality proved to be quite different. Nombela was the first to leave for Madrid that year, alongside his family. After long arguments over the trip with Doña Manuela, who resisted the idea, Bécquer finally left for Madrid in October of that same year, alone and quite poor, except for the little money that his uncle provided for him. The third friend, Campillo, did not leave Seville until some time later.

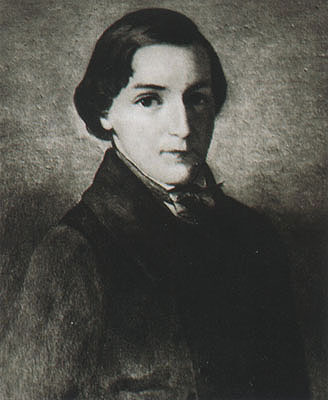
Bécquer at 19

Life in Madrid was not easy for the poet. The dream of fortune that had guided his steps towards the city were replaced by a reality of poverty and disillusionment. The two friends were soon joined by Luis García Luna, also a poet from Seville, who shared the same dreams of greatness. The three began writing and trying to make themselves known as authors, without much luck. Bécquer, the only one of the three without a real job and a steady income, went to live with an acquaintance of Luna, Doña Soledad. A year later, in 1854, he moved to Toledo with his brother Valeriano, a lovely place in which he was able to write his book: "History of the Spanish temples". The poet was interested in Lord Byron and his "Hebrew Melodies" or his "Heine del Intermezzo", with Eulogio Florentino's help in the translation.

The poet died on 22 December 1870 from tuberculosis, an illness known as "the romantic illness" because of how common it was during the romantic period in Spain. Before this tragic sickness took his life away, Bécquer asked his good friend, Augusto Ferrán, also a poet, to burn all his letters and publish his poems instead, since he thought once he was dead, his work would be more valuable. His body was buried in Madrid, and afterwards was moved to Seville along with his brother's.

== Early career ==
After several failed commercial attempts with his friends, the writer finally accepted a job as a writer for a small newspaper. This, however, did not last long, and soon Gustavo was out of a job again. It was then that, in 1855, Valeriano arrived in Madrid, and Gustavo went to live with his brother. They would never be apart after that.

After a few other unsuccessful attempts at publishing their work, Bécquer and Luna began working together writing comic plays for theater, as a means of making a living. This collaboration continued until 1860. At that time, Bécquer worked intensively on his belated project Historia de los templos de España (History of Spain's temples), the first volume of which saw the light of day in 1857. It was also during this period that he would meet the young Cuban poet Rodríguez Correa, who would later play a major role in collecting his works for posthumous publication. It was around this time, between 1857 and 1858, that Bécquer became ill, and was left to the care of his brother and friends. Shortly after, he met by chance a girl by the name of Julia Espín, with whom he fell deeply in love, and who also served as an inspiration for much of his romantic poetry. This love, however, was unrequited.

Around 1860, Rodríguez Correa found Bécquer a government position, from where he was fired shortly after for spending his time writing and drawing while on the job.

== Love life and literary career ==
In 1861, Bécquer met Casta Esteban Navarro, and married her in May 1861. Bécquer was believed to have had a romance with another girl named Elisa Guillén shortly before the marriage, which is also thought to have been arranged, (if not somewhat forced), by the parents of the girl. The poet was not happy in the marriage, and took any chance he got to follow his brother Valeriano on his constant trips. Casta began to take up with a man with whom she had had a relationship shortly before marrying Bécquer, something that was later blamed on Bécquer's trips and lack of attention by Casta's acquaintances. The poet wrote very little about Casta, as most of his inspiration at this time, (as it is the case with the famous rima LIII), came from his feelings towards Elisa Guillén. Casta and Gustavo had three children: Gregorio Gustavo Adolfo, Jorge, and Emilio Eusebio. The third child was possibly fruit of the extramarital relations of Casta.

In 1865, Bécquer stopped writing for the prolific literary section of the newspaper El Contemporáneo, where he had finally gained fame as a writer, and began writing for two others, El Museo Universal and Los Tiempos, the latter founded after El Contemporáneo was dissolved. He had also been appointed to a government post, fiscal de novelas (supervisor attorney for novels and published literature) by his friend, patron and benefactor, founder of both newspapers El Contemporáneo and Los Tiempos, former President of Spain, and the then Spanish Minister of Home Affairs, Luis González Bravo. This was a well-paid job, which Bécquer held on and off until 1868. From this government job he was able to get his brother Valeriano a government pension as an art painter of "Spanish regional folk costumes and traditions". During this period, the poet concentrated on finishing his compilations of poems Rimas (Rhymes) and Libro de los gorriones (Book of the Sparrows), so he did not publish a great deal of his works. A completed manuscript of his poems was given for its publication to Luis González Bravo, (President of Spain for a second time in 1868), as he had supportively offered so to Bécquer, but regrettably it was lost during the political revolution of 1868, which hastily exiled President Luis González Bravo and Queen Isabella II of Spain to France. It was at this time that the poet left Spain for Paris, although he returned not long after. By 1869, the poet and his brother went back to Madrid together, along with Gustavo's sons. Here, he started re-writing the book that had gone missing, due to his loyal benefactor Luis González Bravo's forced exile to France the year before. Gustavo was, by then, living a bohemian life, as his friends later described. With the sole purpose of putting bread on the table, Bécquer went back to writing for El museo universal, and then left to take the job of literary director of a new artistic magazine called La ilustración de Madrid. Valeriano also collaborated with this project. Gustavo's publications in this magazine consisted mostly of short texts to accompany his brother's illustrations. Around this time, between 1868 and 1869, the two brothers published a book of satiric and erotic illustrations under a pseudonym, which humorously critiqued the life of royalty in Spain, called Los Borbones en pelotas.

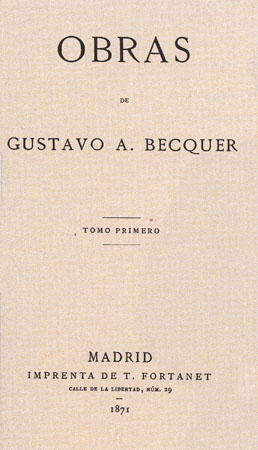
Title page of Bécquer's 'Obras' (1871), First Edition

In 1870, Valeriano fell ill and died on September 23. This had a terrible impact on Gustavo, who suffered a serious depression as a result. After publishing a few short works in the magazine, the poet also became gravely ill and died in poverty in Madrid, on December 22, almost three months after his beloved brother. The cause of death is debated: while his friends described symptoms of pulmonary tuberculosis, a later study indicates that he may have died of liver complications. Some of his last words are said to be "Acordaos de mis niños" ("remember-don't forget- my children".)

After his death, his friend Rodríguez Correa, with the collaboration of Campillo, Nombela, and Augusto Ferrán, collected and organized his manuscripts for publication, as a way to help the widow and children of the poet. The first edition of their effort was published in 1871, and a second volume was published six years later. Further revisions came out on the editions released in 1881, 1885, and 1898.

In such prose tales as El Rayo de Luna, El Beso, and La Rosa de Pasión, Bécquer is manifestly influenced by E. T. A. Hoffmann, and as a poet he has analogies with Heine. His work is unfinished and unequal, but it is singularly free from the rhetoric characteristic of his native Andalusia and, according to the Encyclopædia Britannica Eleventh Edition, its lyrical ardor is of a beautiful sweetness and sincerity. He also wrote in an epistolary style: Cartas desde mi Celda – written during his travels to Veruela's Monastery – or La Mujer de Piedra or little theatre plays La novia y el pantalón. It is not so well known that he was an excellent graphic artist. Most of his work concentrated on spontaneity of love and the solitude of nature. His work, and in particular his Rimas, are considered some of the most important work in Spanish poetry, greatly influencing the following generations of writers, notably authors like Antonio Machado and Juan Ramón Jiménez, writers belonging to the Generation of '27, such as Federico García Lorca and Jorge Guillén, and many Hispano-American writers like Rubén Darío.

== Works ==
=== Rhymes (Rimas) ===
Bécquer's poems were recited from memory by his contemporaries, and greatly influenced the generations afterwards. Modeled in brief stanza forms, both musical and erotic, Bécquer's 77 Rimas came to a few thousand lines, considered the foundation of modern Spanish poetry. Luis Cernuda wrote: "There is in Bécquer an essential poet quality: that of expressing with a clarity and firmness that only classics have... Bécquer plays in our modern poetry a role equivalent to Garcilaso's in our classic poetry: that of creating a new tradition, which he bestows upon his descendants." His book was composed after his death from many sources, the primary one being a manuscript by Bécquer himself, The Book of Sparrows.

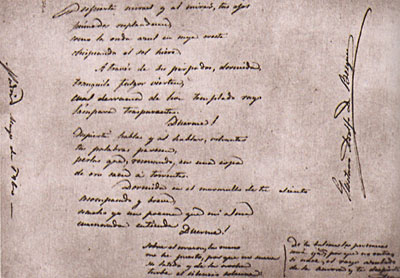
Autograph of Bécquer's Rima XXVII

Birds are a motif that shows up frequently in Bécquer's canon, such as in "Rima LIII" (Rhyme 53), where swallows appear as a sign of the end to a passionate relationship.

Volverán las oscuras golondrinas
En tu balcón sus nidos a colgar
Y otra vez con el ala a sus cristales,
Jugando llamarán.

Pero aquellas que el vuelo refrenaban
Tu hermosura y mi dicha a contemplar,
Aquellas que aprendieron nuestros nombres,
¡Esas... no volverán!

Translation:

The dark swallows will return
to hang their nests upon your balcony.
And once more with their wings to its windows,
Playing, they will call.

But the ones that used to slow their flight
to behold your beauty and my bliss,
The ones, that learned our names,
Those... will not return!

In Rhymes (Rhyme 21) Bécquer wrote one of the most famous poems in the Spanish language. The poem can be read as a response to a lover who asked what was poetry:

¿Qué es poesía?, dices mientras clavas
en mi pupila tu pupila azul.
¡Qué es poesía! ¿Y tú me lo preguntas?
Poesía... eres tú.

Translation:

What is poetry? you ask, while fixing
your blue pupil on mine.
What is poetry! And you are asking me?
Poetry... is you.

=== Legends ===
The Legends are a variety of romantic tales. As the name implies, most have a legendary tone. Some depict supernatural and semi-religious (Christian) events, like The Mount of the Souls, The Green Eyes, The Rose of the Passion (a blood libel) with references to the Holy Child of La Guardia and The miserere (a religious song). Others cover more or less normal events from a romantic view, like The Moonlight Ray and Three Dates.

The Leyendas (Legends) are:

- El caudillo de las manos rojas, 1858.
- La vuelta del combate, 1858. (Continued: El caudillo de las manos rojas).
- La cruz del diablo, 1860.
- La ajorca de oro, 1861.
- El monte de las ánimas, 1861.
- Los ojos verdes, 1861.
- Maese Pérez, el organista, 1861.
- Creed en Dios, 1862.
- El rayo de luna, 1862.
- El Miserere, 1862.
- Tres fechas, 1862.
- El Cristo de la calavera, 1862.
- El gnomo, 1863.
- La cueva de la mora, 1863.
- La promesa, 1863.
- La corza blanca, 1863.
- El beso, 1863.
- La Rosa de Pasión, 1864.
- La creación, 1861.
- ¡Es raro!, 1861.
- El aderezo de las esmeraldas, 1862.
- La venta de los gatos, 1862.
- Apólogo, 1863.
- Un boceto del natural, 1863.
- Un lance pesado.
- Memorias de un pavo, 1865.
- Las hojas secas.
- Historia de una mariposa y una araña.
- La voz del silencio, 1923, Released by Fernando Iglesias Figueroa.
- La fe salva, 1923, Released by Fernando Iglesias Figueroa.
- La mujer de piedra, Unfinished.
- Amores prohibidos.
- El rey Alberto.

=== Narrative ===
He also wrote some narrative pieces in prose, "Narraciones", which are loaded with imagination and implausibility, such as "Memorias de un Pavo" (Memoirs of a Turkey) in which, as the title implies, he describes the trip of a turkey from its home farm to the city, and its purchase to be eaten, when its writings are discovered inside the already cooked body.
