= Jenaro Pérez Villaamil =

Spanish painter

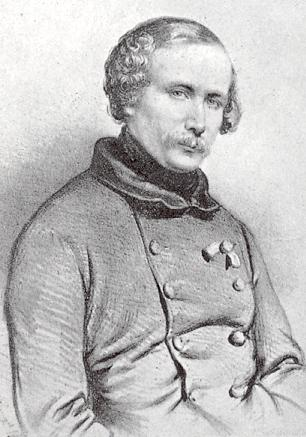
- Portrait of Jenaro Pérez Villaamil by Louis-Joseph Ghémar, 1843
- Born: 3 February 1807; Ferrol, Galicia, Spain
- Died: 5 June 1854 (aged 47); Madrid, Spain
- Education: Santiago de Compostela
- Known for: Painter
- Movement: Orientalist; Romantic

Jenaro Pérez de Villaamil y d'Huguet (3 February 1807 – 5 June 1854) was a Spanish painter in the Romantic style who specialized in landscapes with figures and architectural scenes. He often inflated the scale of the buildings relative to the figures to make them more impressive.

== Biography ==
He was born in Ferrol, Galicia. In 1812, he was enrolled at the military academy in Santiago de Compostela, where he assisted his father, who was a professor there. He went to Madrid in 1820 to study at the "Reales Estudios de San Isidro" (now part of the Colegio Imperial de Madrid). Three years later, he went to Cádiz to enlist in the army fighting the "Hundred Thousand Sons of Saint Louis" sent by the Duke of Angoulême. He was wounded and briefly held as a prisoner of war. Afterwards, he remained there to study at the "Escuela de Bellas Artes".

In 1830, he went to San Juan, Puerto Rico, with his brother Juan (died 1863), who was also a painter, where they decorated the Teatro Tapia and remained there for a few more years, working as scenographers. Upon his return to Spain in 1833, he made the acquaintance of the Scottish painter David Roberts, who had a decisive influence on his style.

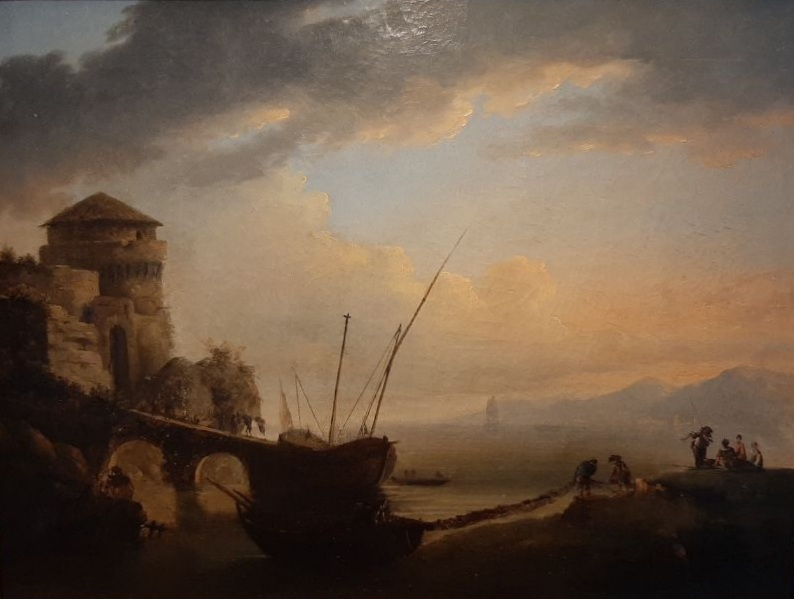
Fishermen on the Shore

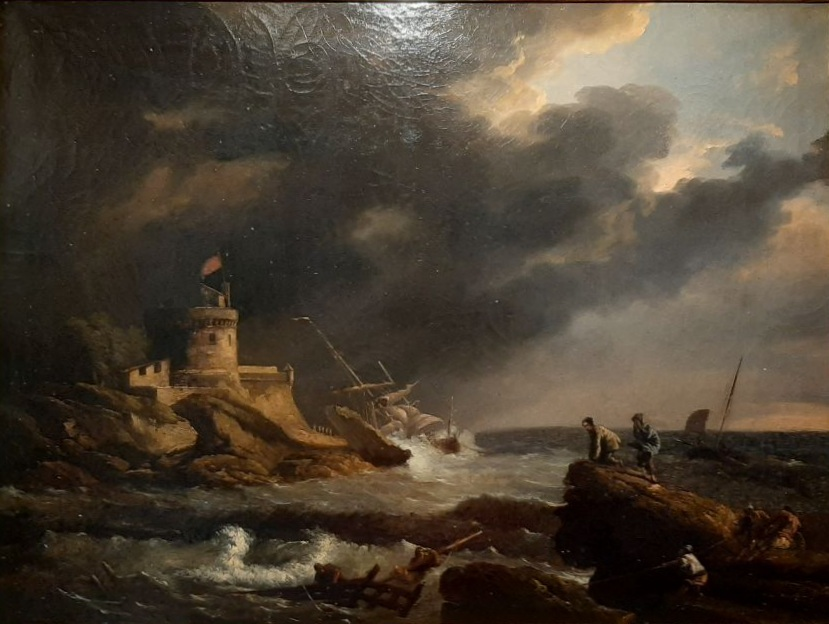
The Tempest

He settled in Madrid in 1834 and became a member of the Real Academia de Bellas Artes de San Fernando the following year. In 1840, he was named honorary court painter to Queen Isabella II. During the regime of Baldomero Espartero, from 1840 to 1844, he left his wife and young child and lived in self-imposed exile in France and Belgium, using artistic affairs as an excuse for his absence. After travelling through Europe, he returned in 1845 and obtained the chair of landscape painting at the Academia, where he later became the director.

He returned to Galicia for an extended stay in 1849 and made extensive travels throughout Spain until 1852, when he began to suffer from liver disease. He died in Madrid two years later, aged only forty-seven.

== Selected paintings ==
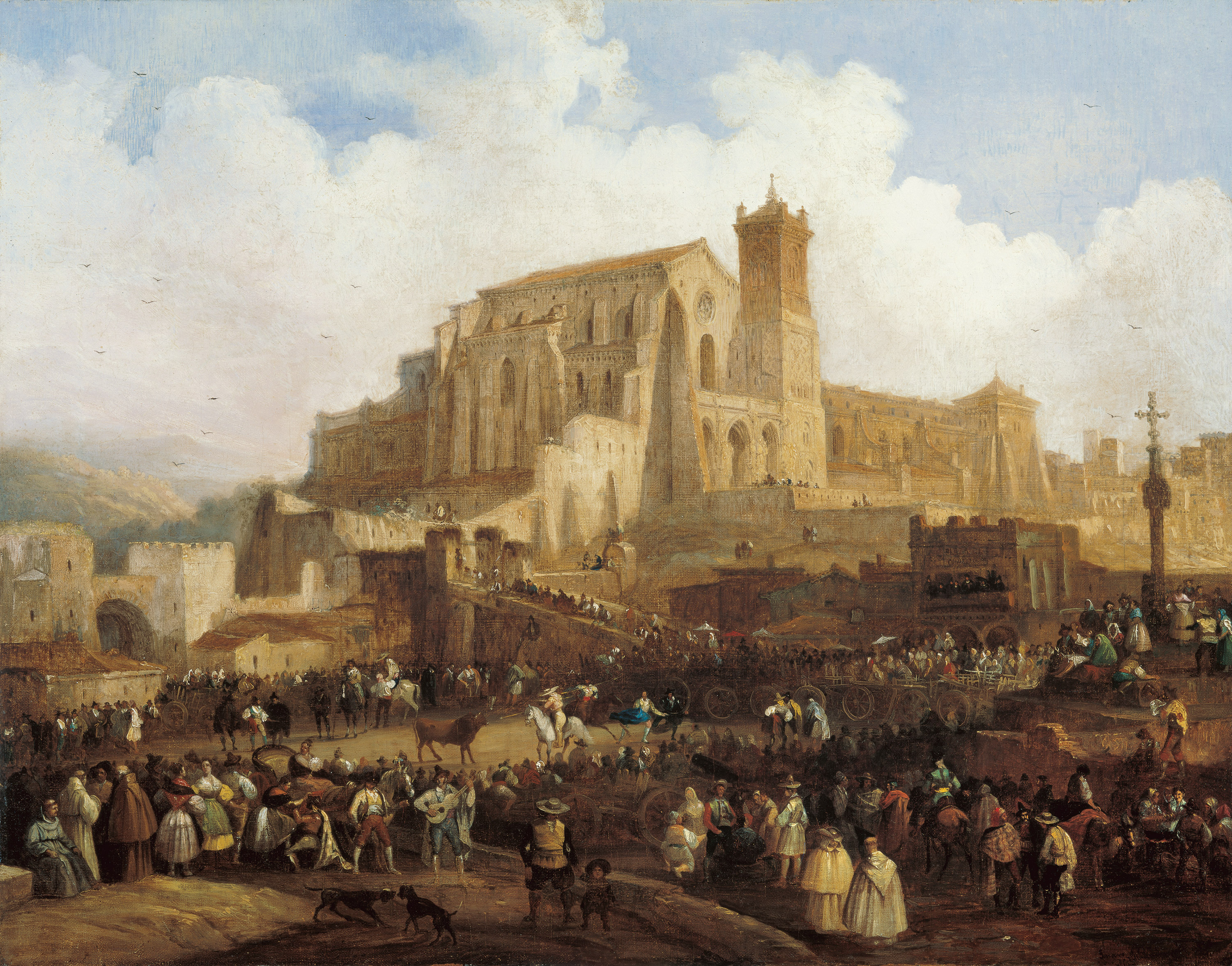
Village Bullfight (1838)

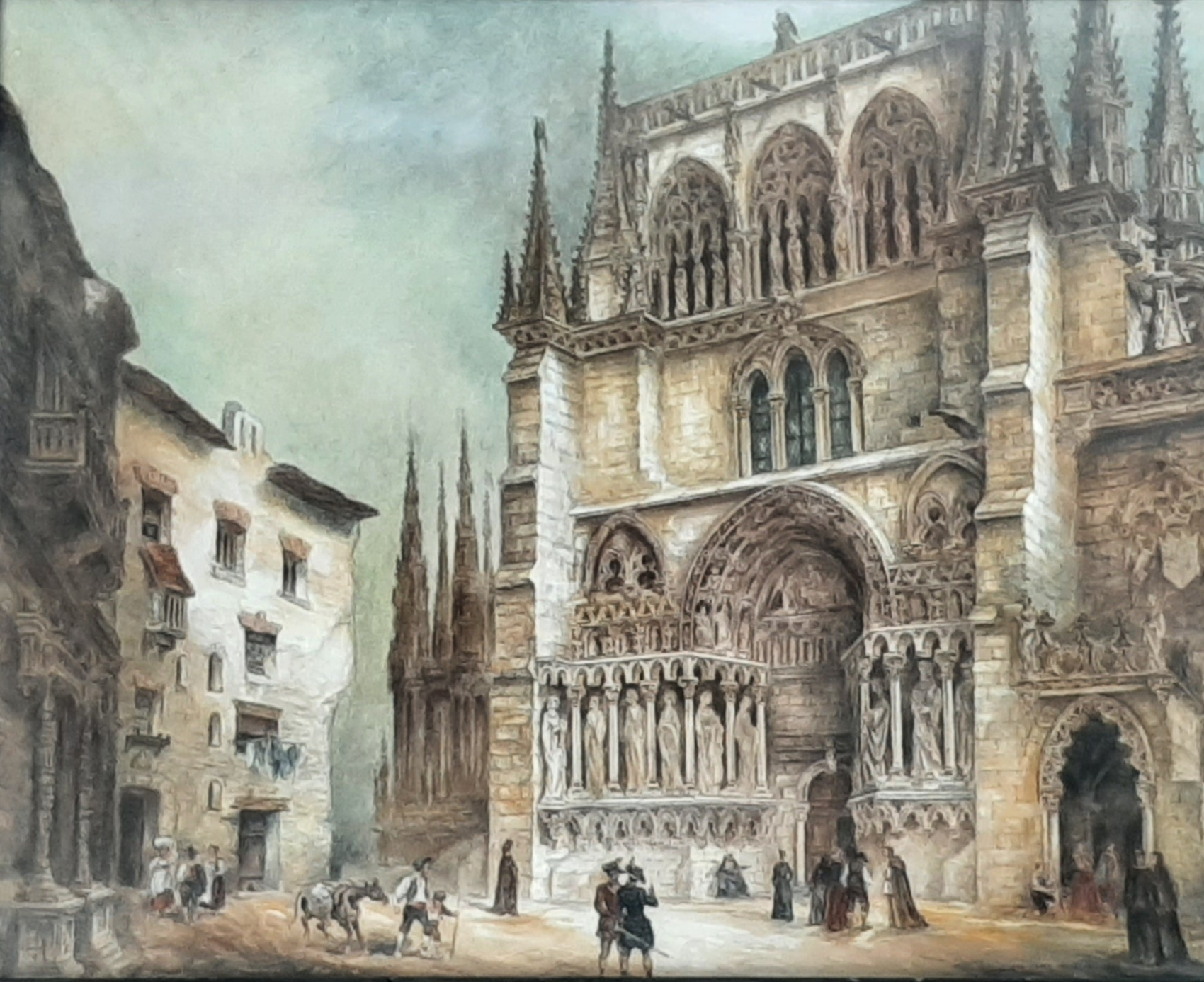
Facade of the Cathedral (before 1842)

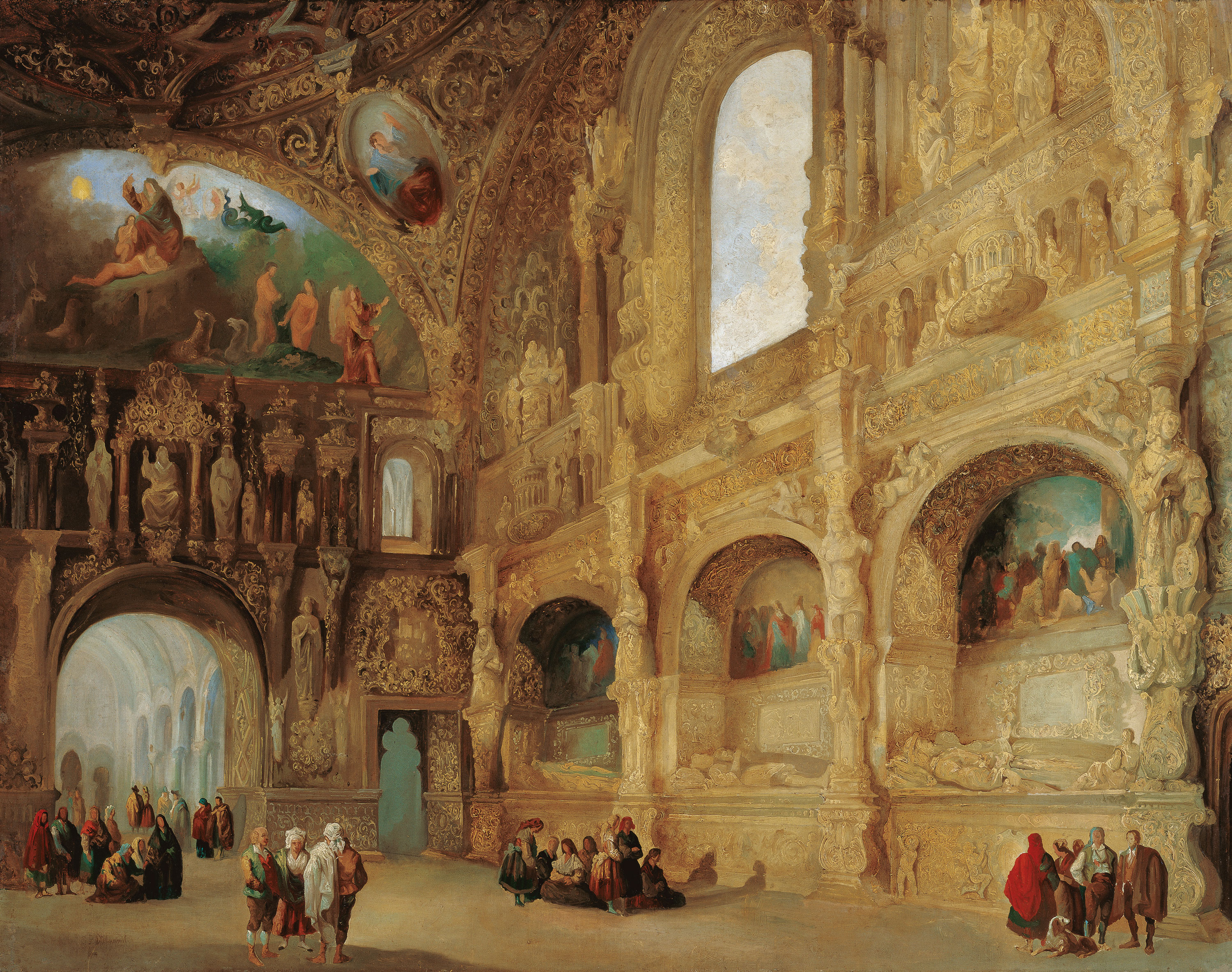
The Chapel of the Benavente Family in Medina de Rioseco (1842)

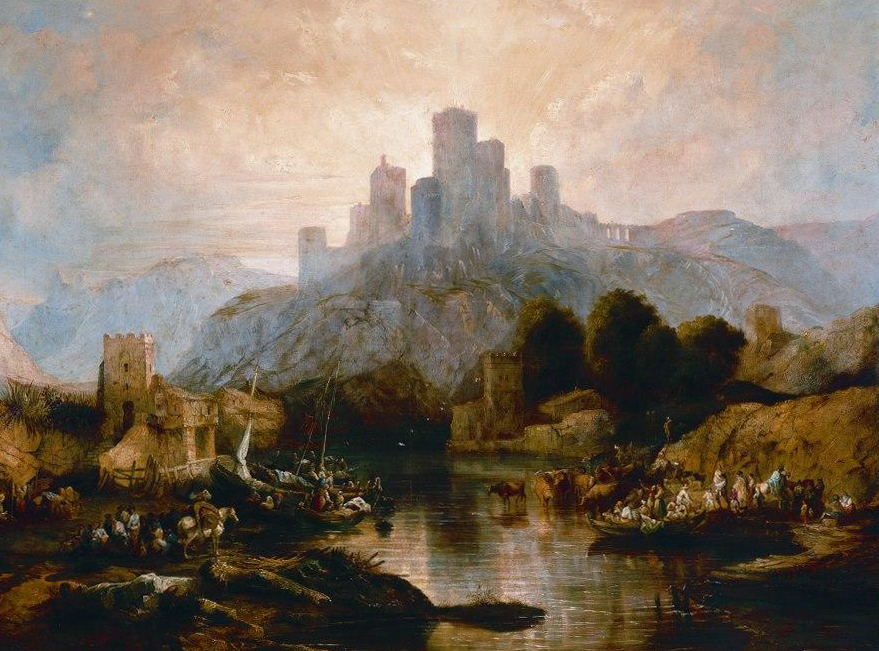
Castle of Alcala de Guadaira (1843)

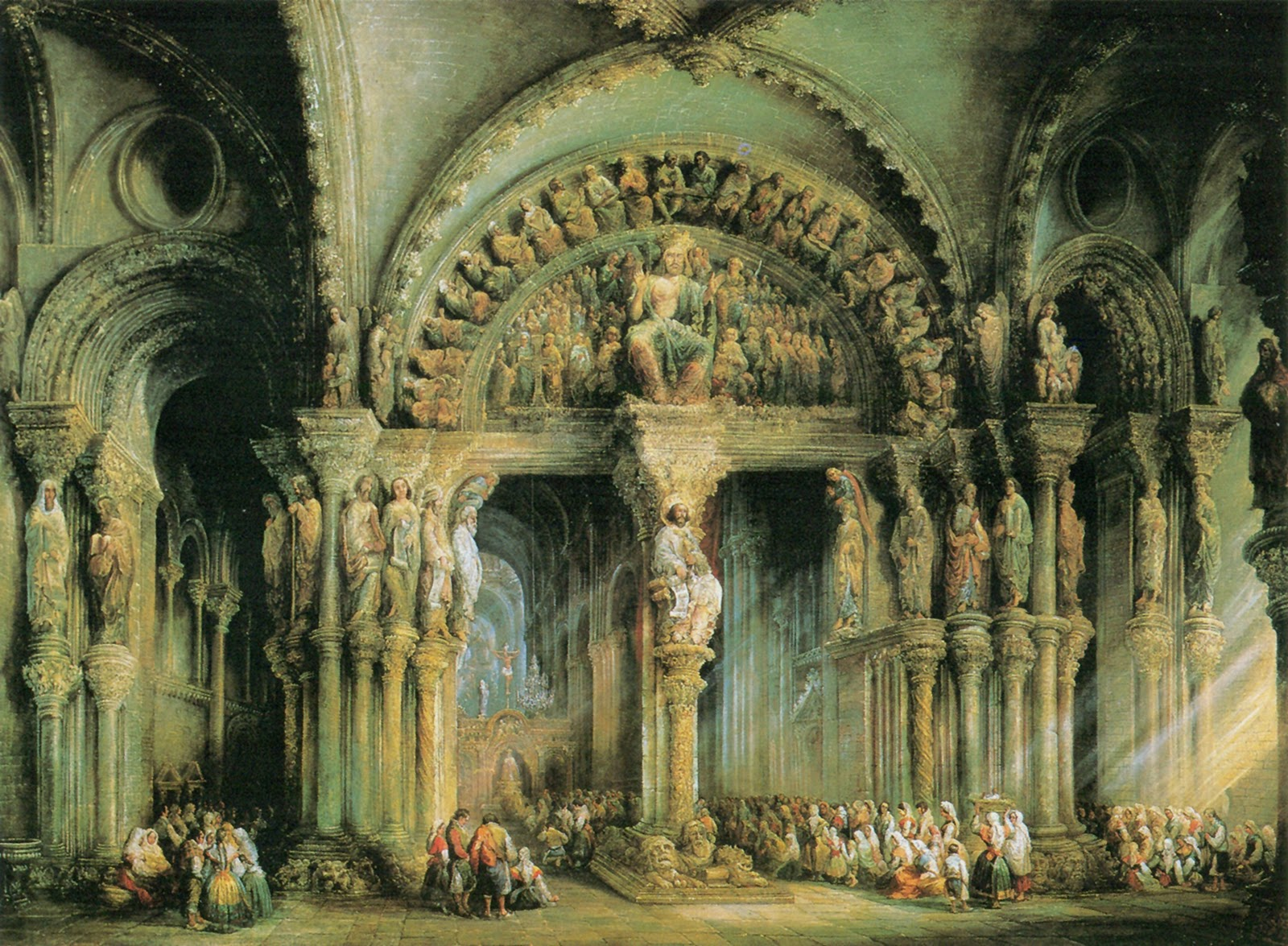
Pórtico de la Gloria, Santiago de Compostela Cathedral (1849)

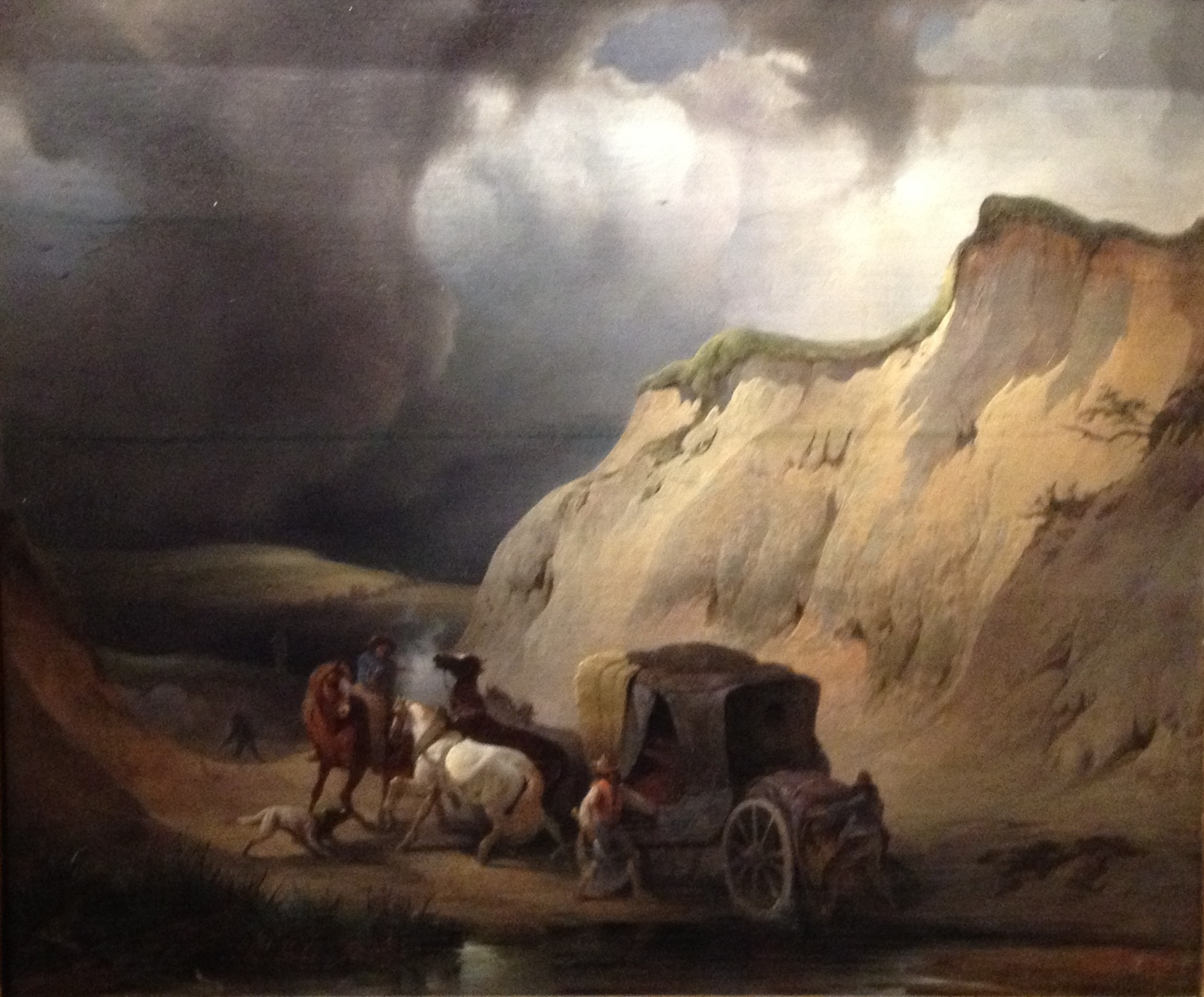
Attack on the Stagecoach (1850)

== Publications ==
- Jenaro Pérez de Villaamil, with text by Patricio de la Escosura: España artística y monumental: vistas y descripción de los sitios y monumentos más notables de España. París: Alberto Hauser (Imprint of Fain & Thunot); Vol.I 1842, Vol.II 1844, Vol.III 1850.
