= Hôtel du Petit-Bourbon =

Parisian town house of the royal House of Bourbon

Coordinates: 48.85950°N 2.33970°E

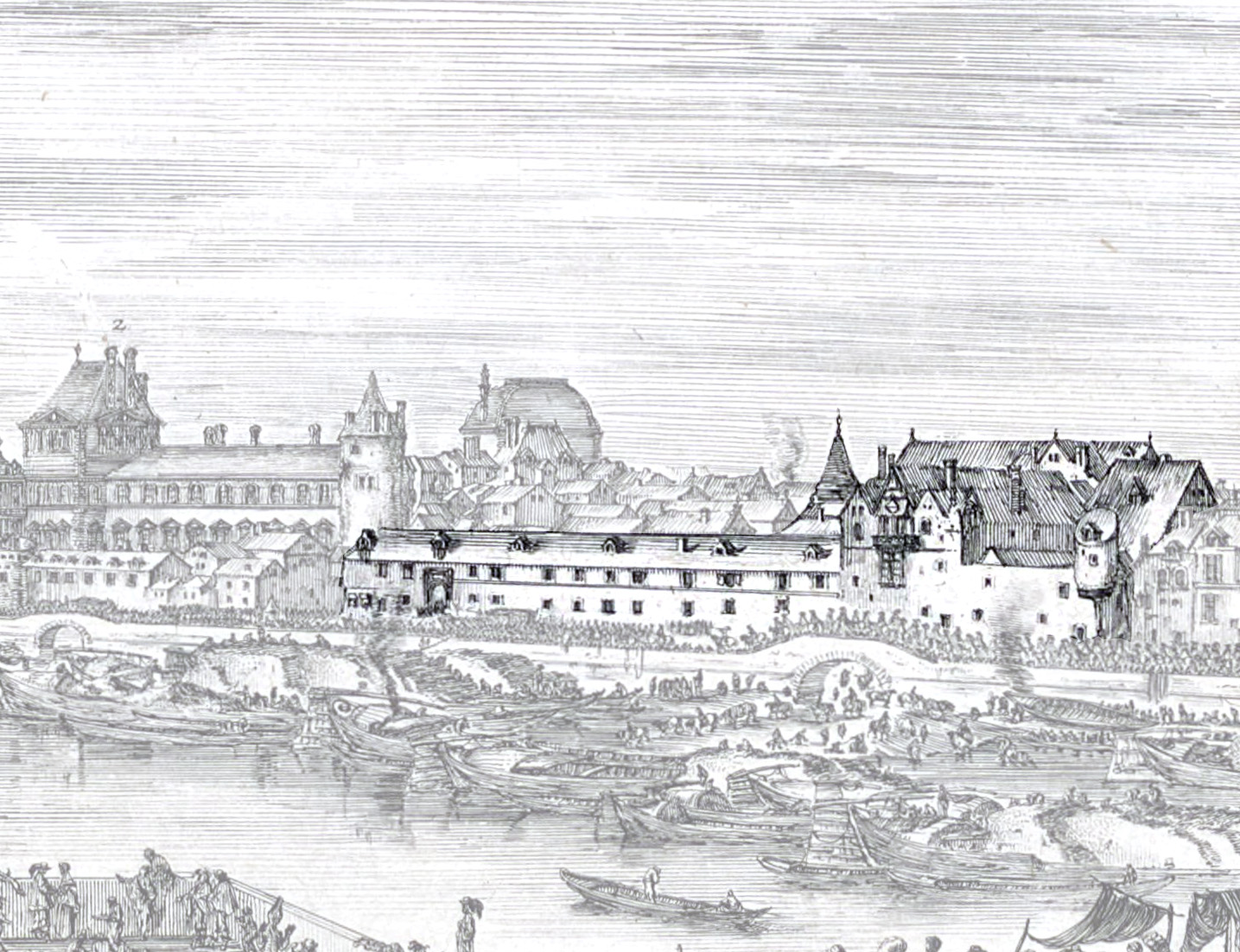
View of the river facade of the Petit-Bourbon (with the Louvre on the left) from a 1646 engraving by Stefano della Bella

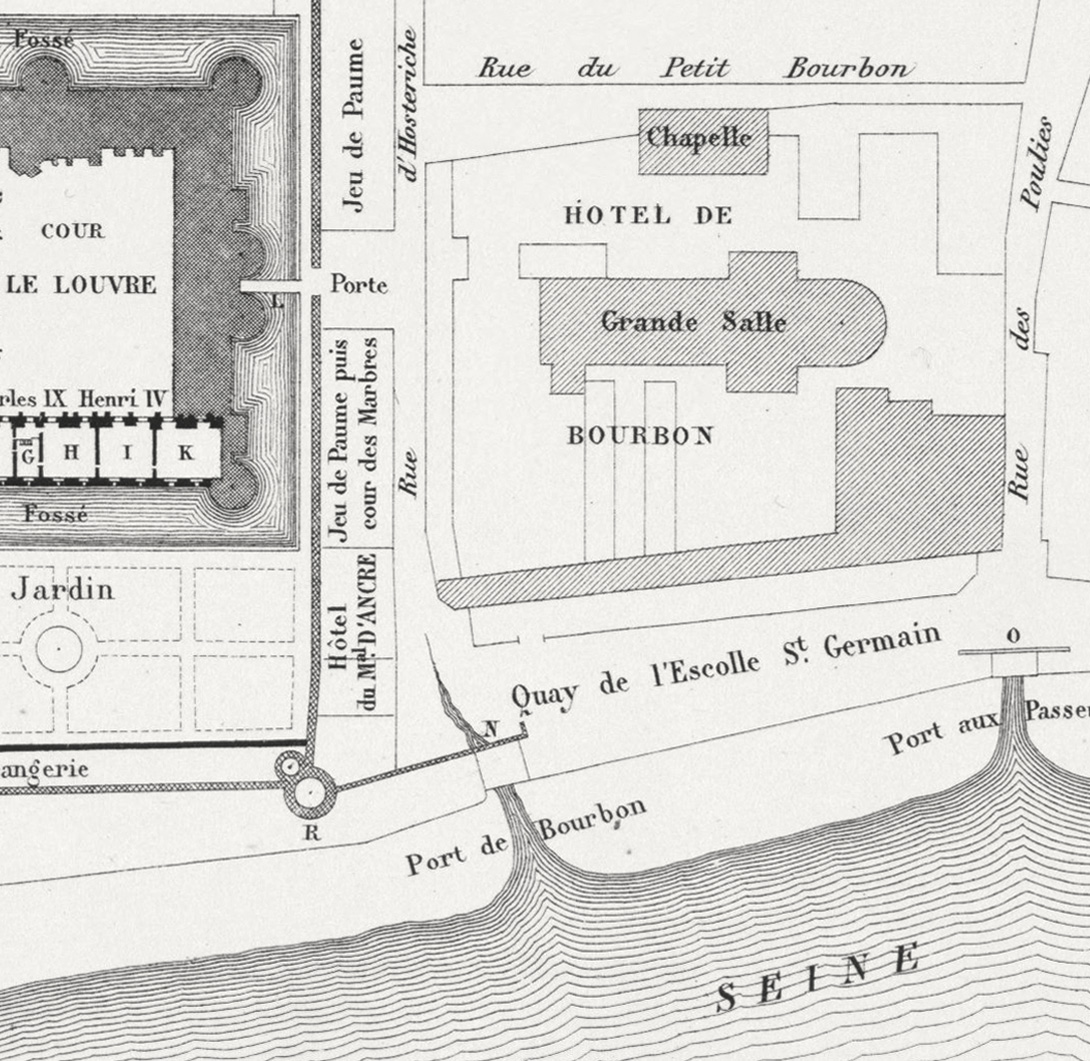
Site plan of the Petit-Bourbon

The Hôtel du Petit-Bourbon (French pronunciation: [otɛl dy pəti buʁbɔ̃]), a former Parisian town house of the royal House of Bourbon, was located on the right bank of the Seine on the rue d'Autriche, between the Louvre to the west and the Church of Saint-Germain l'Auxerrois to the east. It was constructed in the 14th century, not long after the Capetian kings of France enlarged the fortress of the Louvre in order to use it as a royal residence. On two 1550 maps it is shown simply as the Hôtel de Bourbon, but by 1652, as the Petit-Bourbon on the map of Gomboust (see below). The Bourbons took control of France in 1589, at which time they also acquired the Louvre.

The Great Hall, the Grande Salle du Petit-Bourbon, was larger than any room in the Louvre, and served as the first theatre of the troupe of Molière upon their arrival in Paris in 1658; but by 1660 Molière and his actors were evicted, and the Petit-Bourbon was pulled down to make space for the construction of the Louvre Colonnade.

== History ==
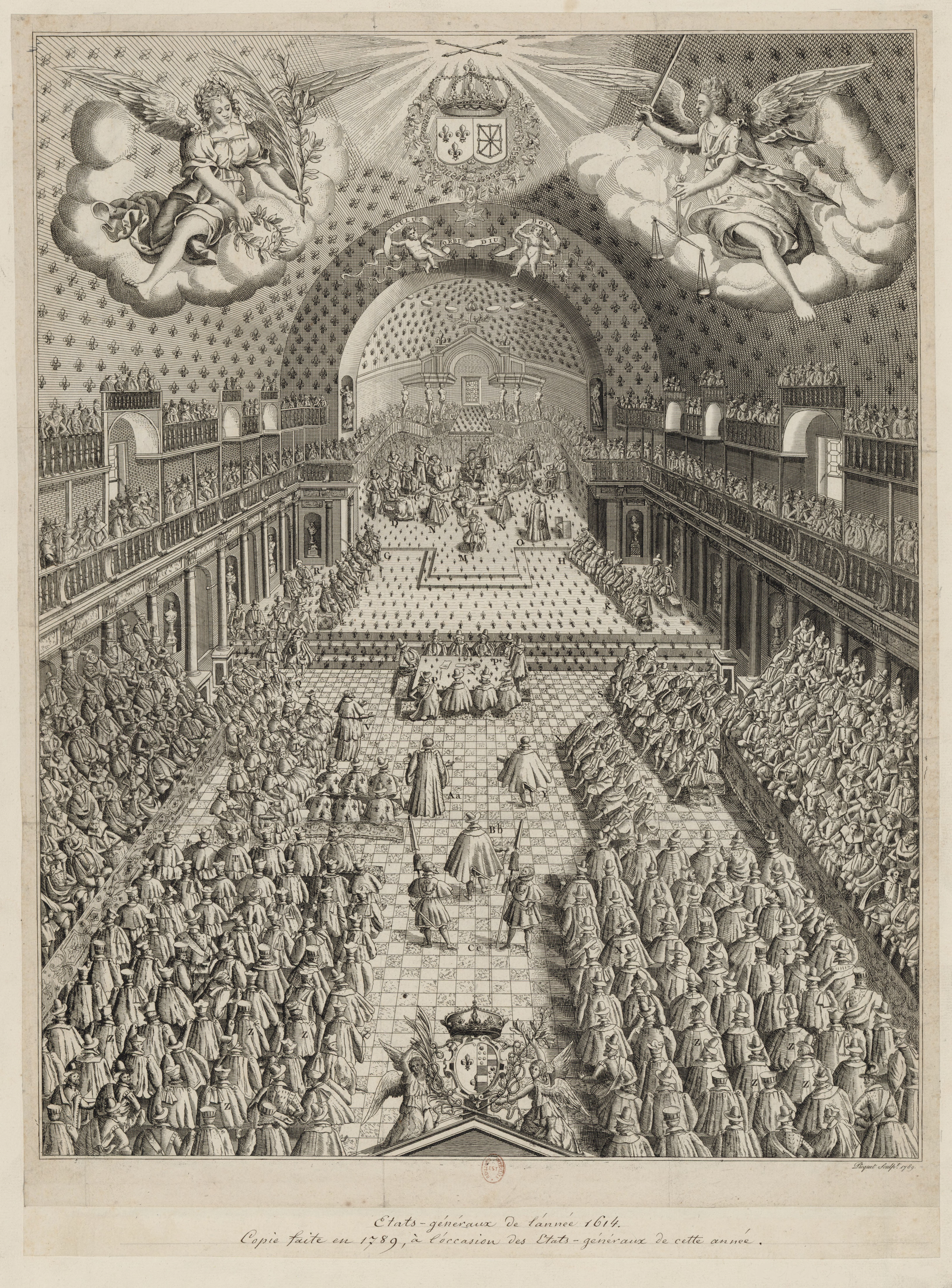
Estates General of 1614 in the Salle du Petit-Bourbon

When in the fourteenth century the kings of France began to use the Louvre as their primary Paris residence, courtiers needed to be in Paris in order to pay their respects to the king and to receive his favors. They therefore constructed magnificent town houses (hôtels particuliers) in the vicinity of the Louvre, very few of which have survived to the present day.

According to Henri Sauval, from 1303 to 1404 the Bourbons purchased houses of more than 300 persons to assemble the site on which their new hotel was built. Over the years they augmented and embellished it such that it became one of the most magnificent in the kingdom. Henri Sauval describes the great hall and the chapel (which both still existed at the time he was writing), as the largest and most sumptuous of their kind in Paris.

In 1523 Charles III, Duke of Bourbon, who was Constable of France at the time, plotted to partition France against the will of King Francis I. When the plot was uncovered, Charles was forced to flee to Italy, and as a result the Hôtel de Bourbon was partly demolished. "Salt was strewed upon the ground which it occupied; the armorial ensigns of the offender were effaced, and the windows and doors that remained were smeared by the executioner with yellow ochre."

== The Grande Salle ==
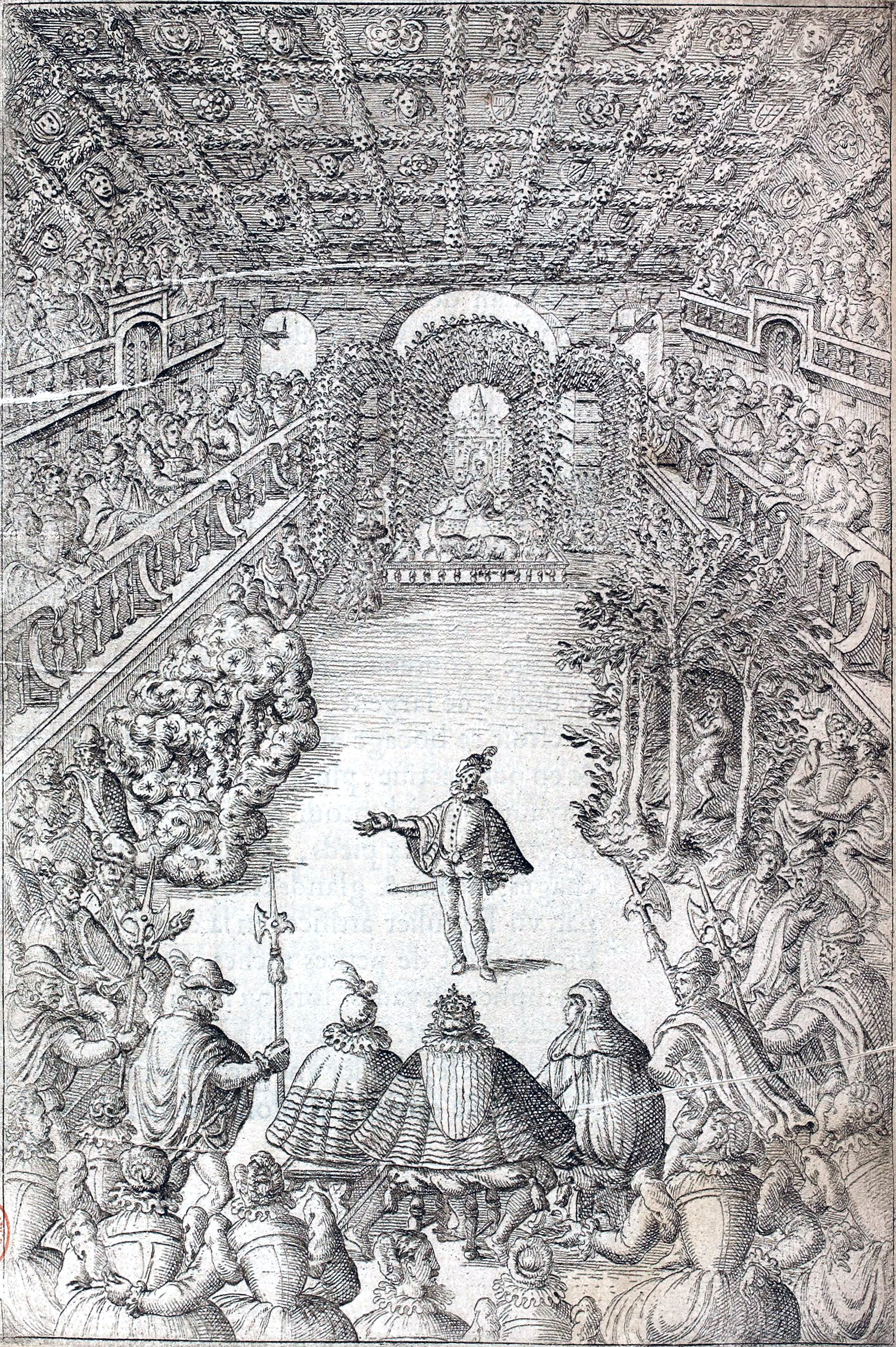
The Ballet Comique de la Reine at the Petit-Bourbon, 1581

The Great Hall (French: Grande Salle) was used for numerous court functions. Catherine de' Medici staged the "politically charged" Paradis d'amour at the Petit-Bourbon on 20 August 1572, at the time of the wedding of the Catholic Marguerite de Valois and the Protestant Henri of Navarre. It was a dramatic ballet with scenery and sung recitatives, and introduced the new genre of ballet de cour.

The Ballet Comique de la Reine, regarded by James R. Anthony as the first true ballet de cour, was performed at the Petit-Bourbon on 15 October 1581, during the festivities surrounding the marriage of the Duke of Joyeuse and Queen Louise of Lorraine's sister, Marguerite de Vaudémont. The French court's first great carousel (a type of tourney performed as a ballet) was held in the Grande Salle in February 1605. The Estates General of 1614 and 1615 and some of the celebrations accompanying the marriage of Louis XIII in 1615 were also held there.

Louis XIII selected the subject for the ballet de cour La délivrance de Renaud, based on the story of Rinaldo in Torquato Tasso's popular 1581 epic poem Gerusalemme liberata. It was first performed on 29 January 1617, when the King danced a demon of fire. It was not difficult to draw a parallel between Tancrède and his knights fighting the monsters of the enchanted forest and Louis XIII and his favorite, Charles d'Albert, 1st Duke of Luynes, rescuing France from its enemies. According to the livret published by Pierre Ballard in 1617, the opening grand concert de musique was performed by "sixty-four voices, twenty-eight viols, and fourteen lutes conducted by le sieur Mauduit."

The dimensions of the hall were ample by Parisian standards: 15 meters wide and 35 meters long with an apse adding an additional 13.5 meters at one end. During the Estates General of 1614, the King and his courtiers sat in the apse, which was decorated with fleur-de-lis. Lawrenson suggests that on some occasions, such as the Ballet Comique de la Reine, a kind of stage was located in the apse. The general public was accommodated in two tiers of balconies on the walls.

La finta pazza, an Italian play by Giulio Strozzi mixed with an opera by Francesco Sacrati was given under the auspices of Cardinal Mazarin in December 1645. The production employed elaborate stage scenery with set changes and special effects accomplished via theatre machines designed by Giacomo Torelli.

In February 1650, during the Fronde when all things Italian were suspect, Pierre Corneille's French play Andromède was premiered. This was yet another spectacular play designed by Torelli. The incidental music composed by Charles Coypeau d'Assoucy was intended to cover up the noise of the machinery.

Mazarin's triumph over the Frondeurs and return from exile was celebrated with the Ballet de la Nuit, produced on 23 February 1653 with sets and machinery by Torelli. The young Louis XIV appeared as the "Sun brilliant with light" and danced five other roles. The Italian opera Le nozze di Peleo e di Teti by Carlo Caproli was performed on 14 April 1654 with Torelli's scenic machinery again the main attraction, and again Louis XIV danced six roles: Apollo, a Fury, a dryad, an academician, a courtier, and War.

== The Petit-Bourbon on old maps of Paris ==
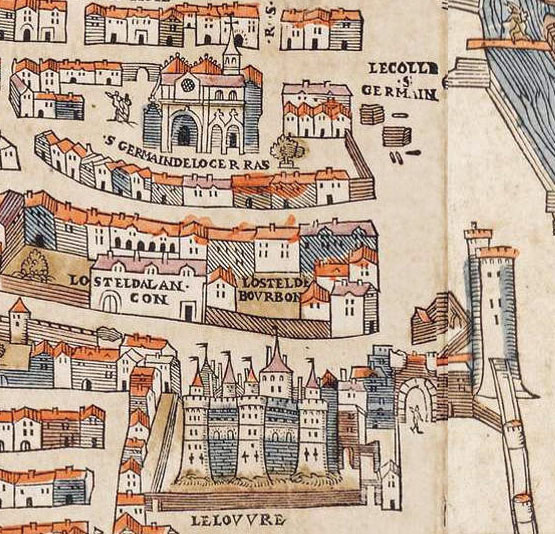
ca. 1550 (Truschet & Hoyau)

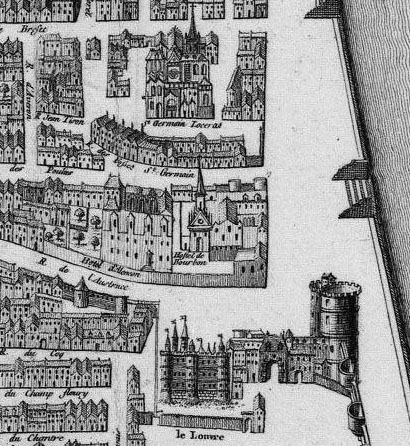
ca. 1550 (Saint Victor)

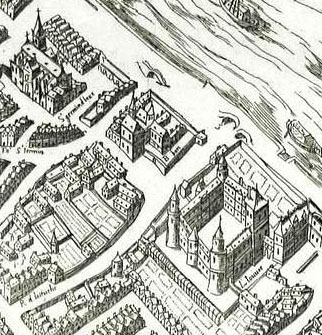
1609 (Quesnel)

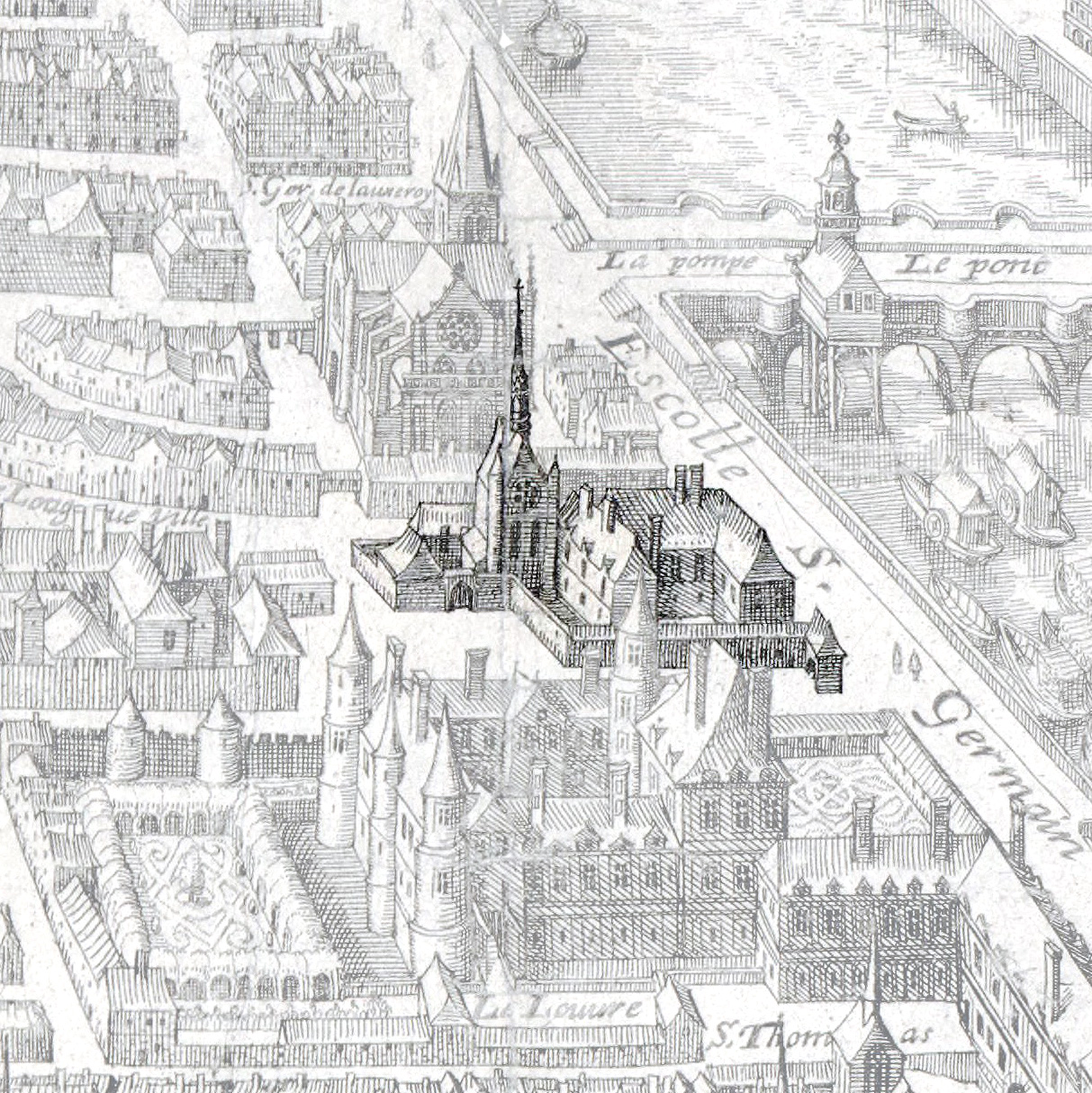
1615 (Mérian)

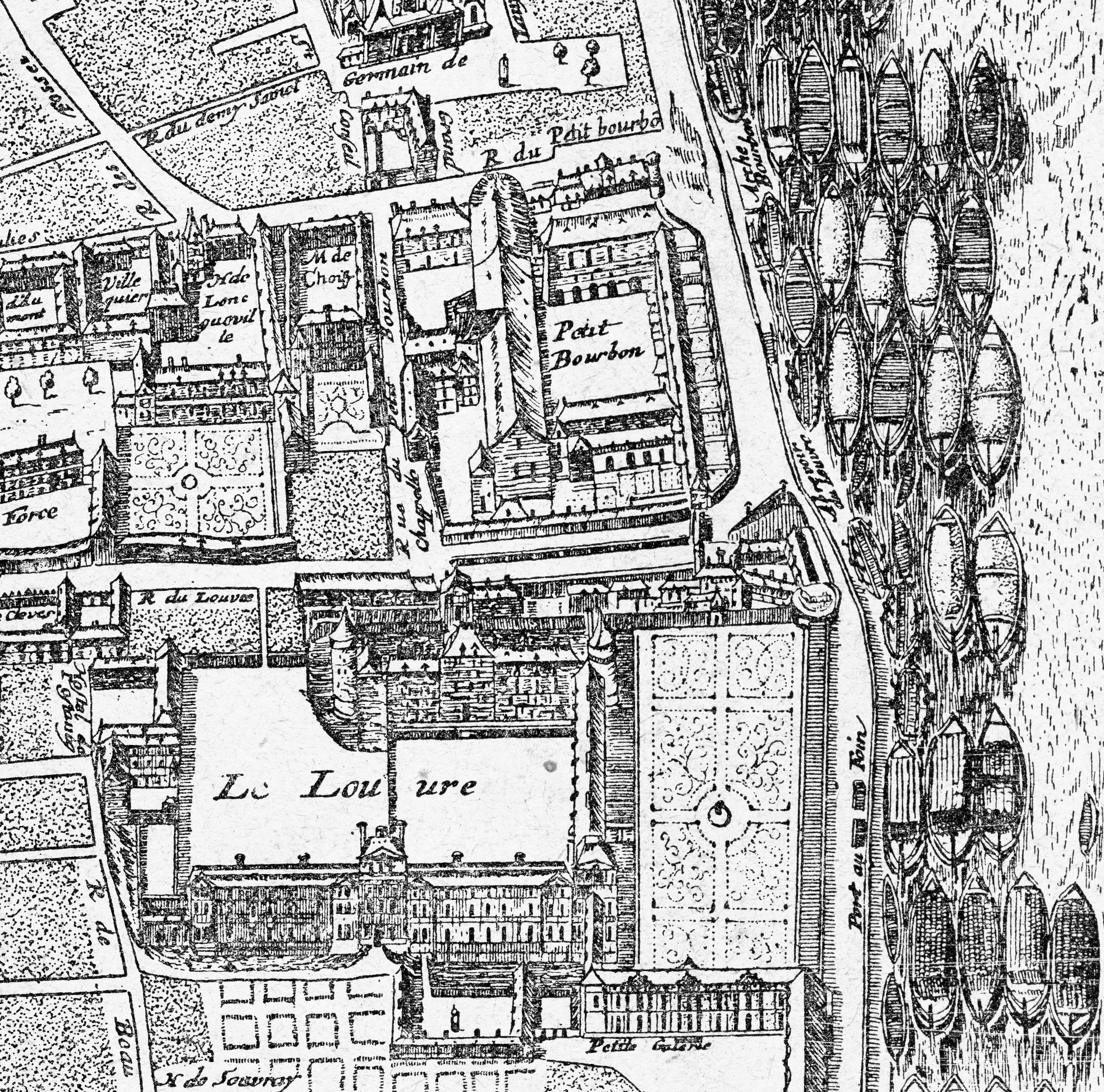
1652 (Gomboust)

== Bibliography ==
- Anthony, James R. (2001). "Ballet de cour" in Sadie 2001. Also at Oxford Music Online (subscription required).
- Bjurström, Per (1962). Giacomo Torelli and Baroque Stage Design, 2nd revised edition, translated from the Swedish. Stockholm: Almqvist & Wiksell. OCLC 10226792.
- Félibien, Michel (1725). Histoire de la ville de Paris, vol. 4. Paris: Guillaume Desprez; Jean Desessartz. View at Google Books.
- Galignani, A.; Galignani, W., publishers (1825). The History of Paris from the Earliest Period to the Present Day, 3 volumes. Paris: A. and W. Galignani. Vols. 1 (2nd ed., 1832), 2 (1825), and 3 (1825) at Google Books.
- Hare, Augustus J.C. (1888). Walks in Paris. New York: George Routledge and Sons. View at Google Books.
- Howarth, William D., editor (1997). French Theatre in the Neo-classical Era, 1550–1789. Cambridge: Cambridge University Press. ISBN 9780521100878.
- Isherwood, Robert M. (1973). Music in the Service of the King. France in the Seventeenth Century. Ithaca: Cornell University Press. ISBN 9780801407345.
- Lawrenson, T. E. (1986). The French Stage and Playhouse in the XVIIth Century: A Study in the Advent of the Italian Order, second edition, revised and enlarged. New York: AMS Press. ISBN 9780404617219.
- Sadie, Stanley, editor (2001). The New Grove Dictionary of Music and Musicians, 2nd edition. London: Macmillan. ISBN 9781561592395 (hardcover). OCLC 419285866 (eBook).
- Sauval, Henri (1724). Histoire et recherches des antiquite's de la ville de Paris, 3 volumes. Paris: Charles Moette; Jacques Chardon. Vols. 1, 2 and 3 (copies 1 and 2) at Google Books.
- Timms, Colin (2001). "Tourney" in Sadie 2001. Also at Oxford Music Online (subscription required).
