= La finta pazza =

1641 opera

- Opera by Francesco Sacrati
- Title page of the libretto printed in 1644
- Translation: The feigned madwoman
- Librettist: Giulio Strozzi
- Language: Italian
- Premiere: 1641 (Carnival season); Teatro Novissimo, Venice

La finta pazza (The feigned madwoman) is an opera composed by Francesco Sacrati to a libretto by Giulio Strozzi. Its premiere in Venice during the Carnival season of 1641 inaugurated the Teatro Novissimo. It became one of the most popular operas of the seventeenth century.

== History ==
=== Venice, 1641 ===
On 30 May 1640, the decision was made to create a new opera house in Venice, to compete with the existing three opera houses, the Teatro San Cassiano, the Teatro Santi Giovanni e Paolo, and the Teatro San Moisè. The Teatro Novissimo marked the first time that a building was created specifically for opera.

Early in 1641, before the opera had been performed for the first time, the libretto was already printed. This was highly unusual and a first for Venice, but would become standard practice at the Teatro Novissimo. Giulio Strozzi was already a well-established libretto writer at the time, and had in 1627 collaborated with Claudio Monteverdi on La finta pazzi Licori, an aborted opera for which no libretto or music has survived.

Francesco Sacrati not only wrote the music but also arranged for the singers, with the role of Deidamia, the "madwoman" from the title, given to the young soprano Anna Renzi, who had only made her debut in Rome the previous year and would now perform in Venice for the first time.

The stage designs and visual effects were made by Giacomo Torelli and described in a 55-page booklet, the Cannocchiale per la finta pazza ("Telescope on the feigned madwoman") that appeared after the opera season.

La finta pazza, the tenth opera ever in Venice, premiered in the Carnival season, and partly due to the good publicity campaign it was a great success, with 12 performances in Venice in 17 days. The libretto was reprinted already the same month, and for the first time in Venice, the opera house reopened after Easter to produce more performances of the work.

=== Later performances ===
The opera was produced in Piacenza in 1644, by the Accademici Febiarmonici; the libretto was printed (with some modifications, omitting the name of Strozzi and references to Venice) in Codogno. The same year, Strozzi again reprinted the libretto under his own name, in reaction to this. The Codogno version was reprinted in Bologna in 1647.

Further performances happened in 1645 in Florence and in Paris (see below).

1647 saw productions in Bologna, by the Accademici Discordati with the probable participation of Francesco Sacrati, and in Genoa; the next year it could be seen in Turin and Reggio Emilia, and in 1652 it appeared in Naples and Milan.

In 1679, it again appeared in Reggio Emilia, this time titled Gli Amori Sagaci. All these performances were using the same libretto, but it is unknown whether they used the same music by Sacrati or other music (having different music for the same libretto at the same time was not unusual).

The opera is considered to be one of the most successful operas of the seventeenth century, and the first big hit of the genre.

=== Paris production of 1645 ===
The Paris production of 1645, presumably the second opera ever in France, was organized by Cardinal Mazarin in December 1645 and staged again by Giacomo Torelli. It featured additional ballets by Giovan Battista Balbi. The performance, in the Hôtel du Petit-Bourbon, was seen by Anne of Austria, queen consort of France, and her son, Louis XIV. Torelli had Nicolas Cochin engrave his designs and published them in a booklet with the libretto and much information about the stage design and dramatics.

Torelli's sets for Paris were not like the ones for Venice, since the published descriptions are quite different and for the Paris production he introduced a new setting for the prologue, which now took place in Flora's garden, and the inferno scene was omitted. Hoping to flatter his French patrons, Torelli included in the background for Act I, scenes 1–2 (The port of Skyros), a view of the Place Dauphine and the relatively new equestrian statue of Henri IV on the Pont Neuf. He was unsure about the reception of this set, since it may have been regarded as inappropriate. The remainder of this design was based on the one he used in Venice for the 1642 premiere of Sacrati's Bellerofonte, which in turn was based on Chenda's Ermiona, produced in Padua in 1636. Ship's prows were visible on the right and on the left, a tall city wall with round towers, evoking the Tour de Nesle in Paris, while for Bellerofonte he had used square towers like those of the Arsenal in Venice.

Giacomo Torelli's set designs for Paris in 1645, engraved by Nicolas Cochin

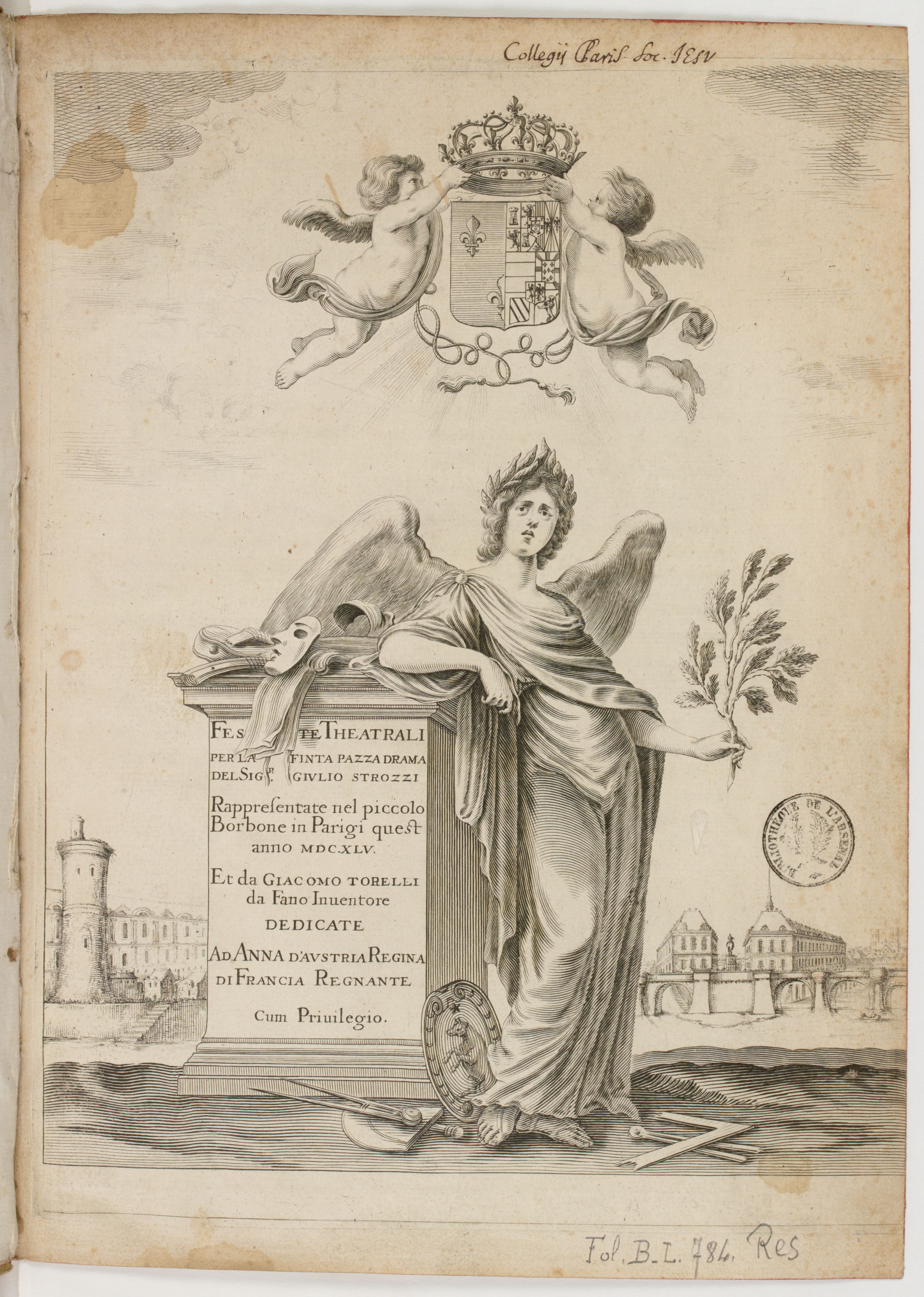
Frontispiece

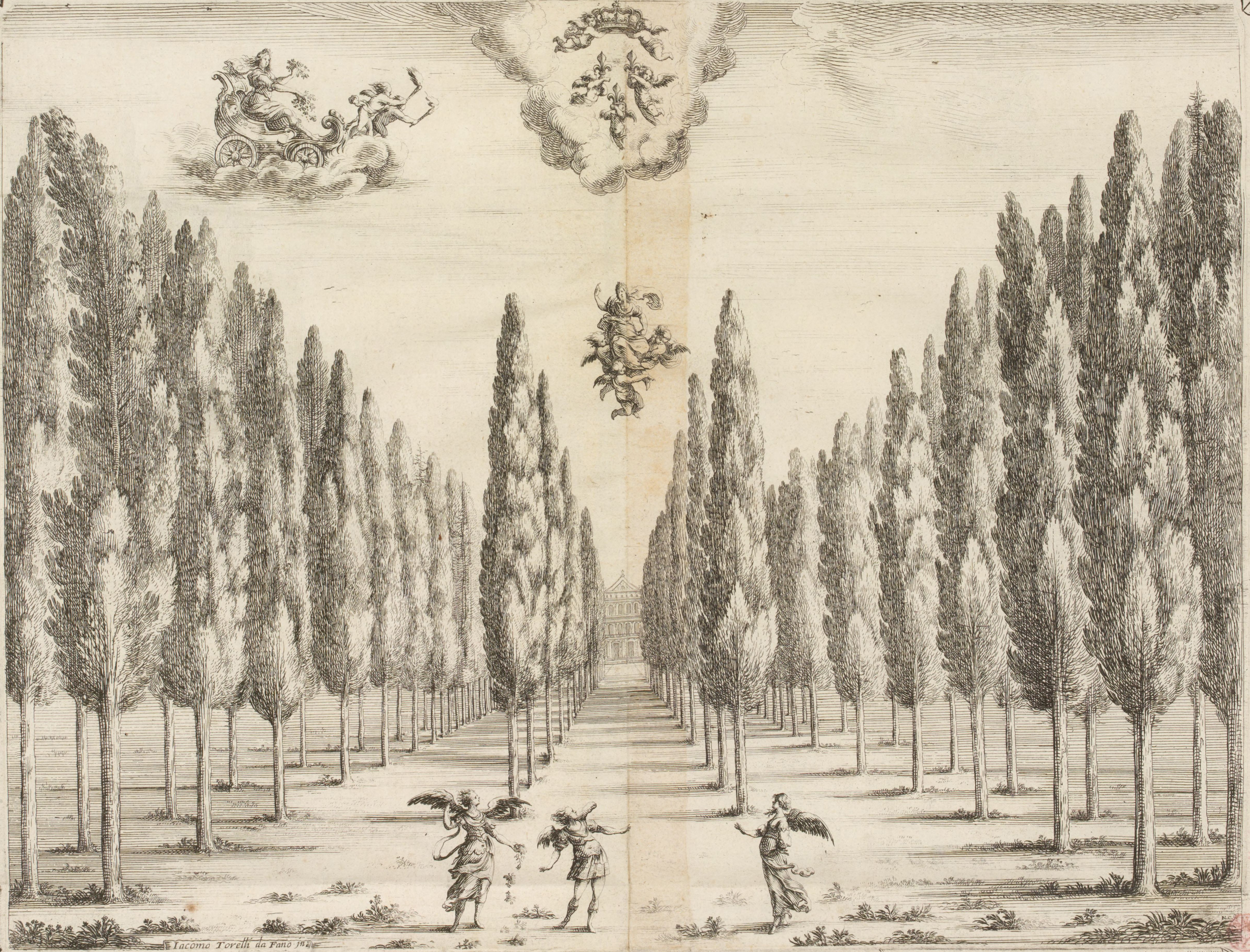
Prologue

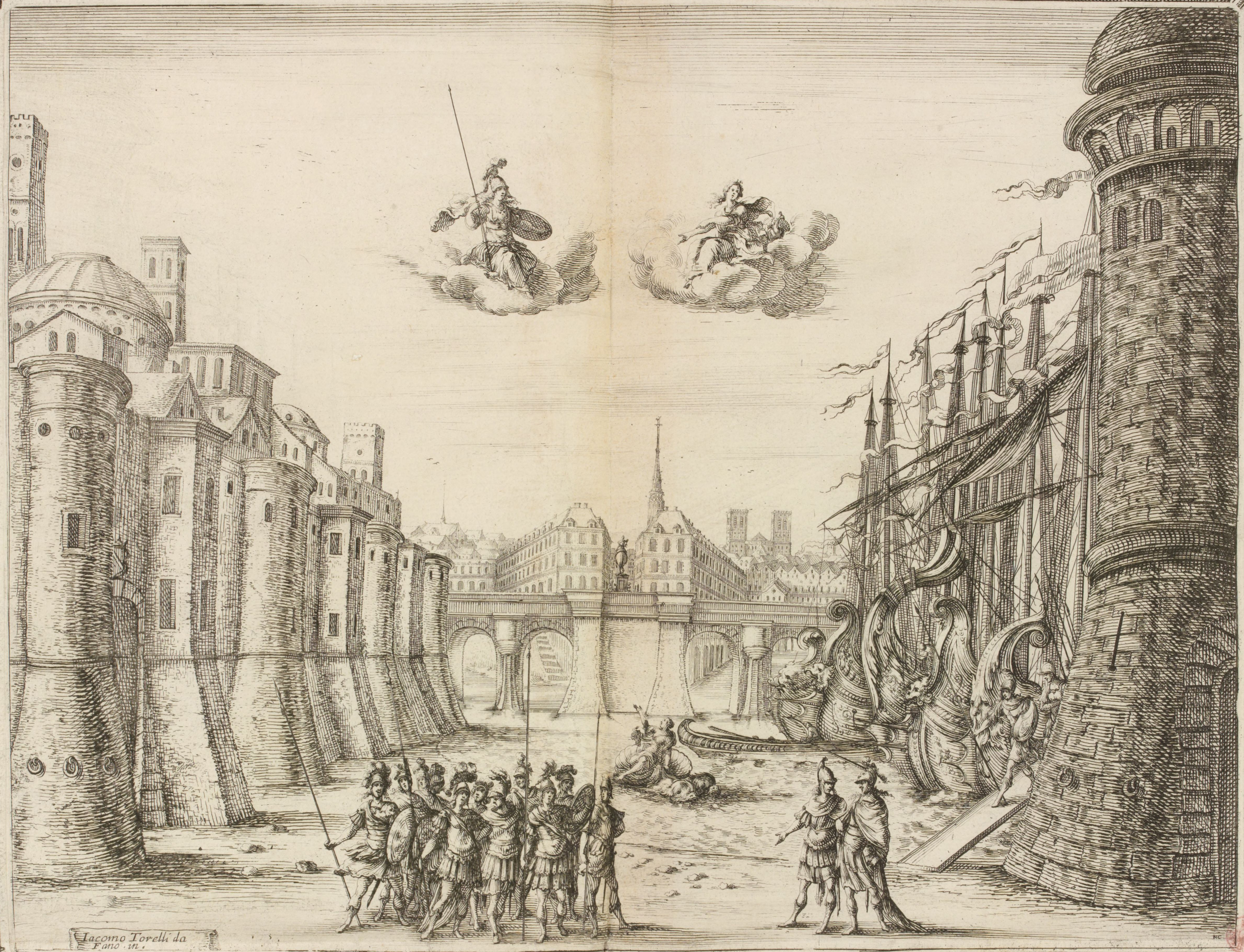
Act I 1–2

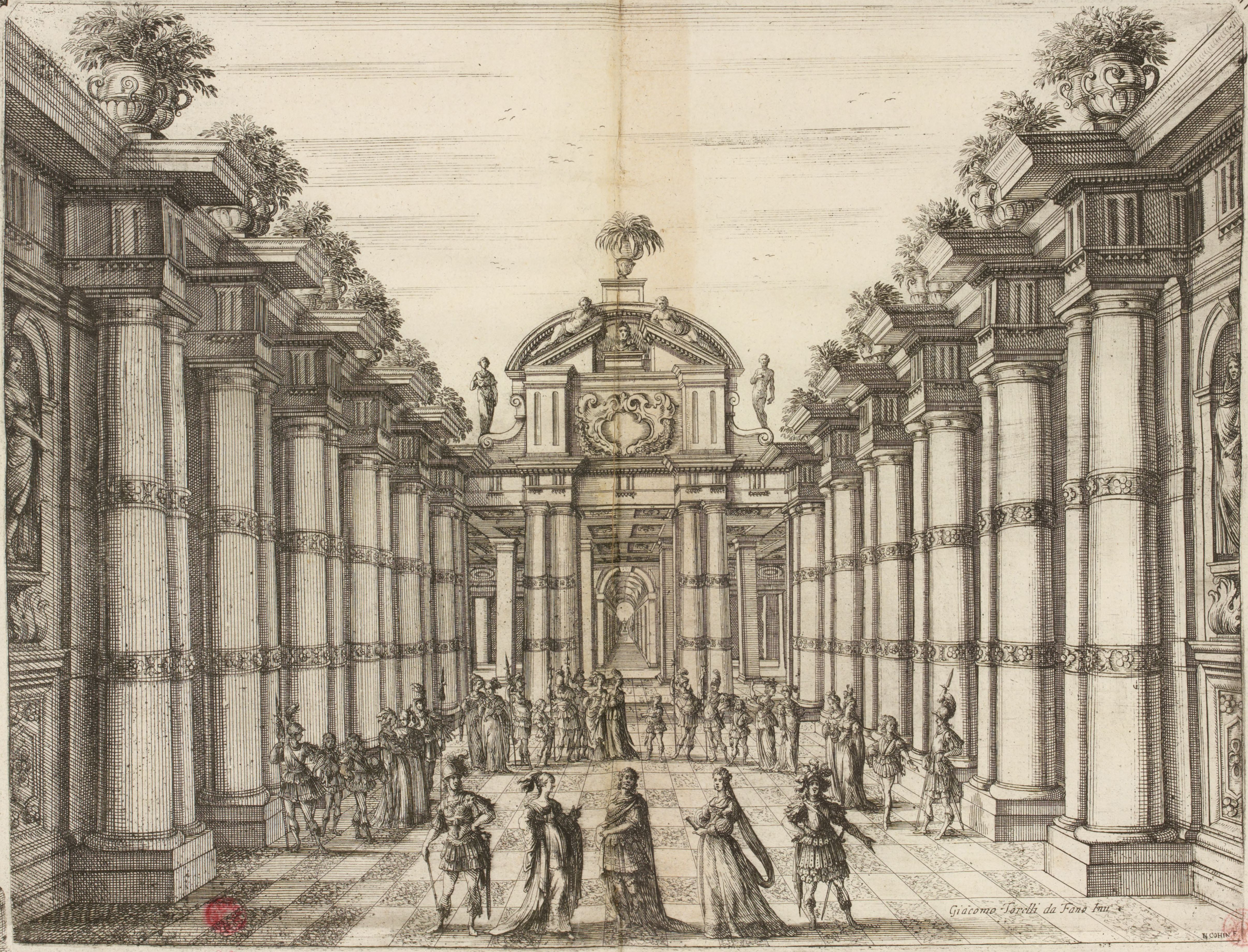
Act I 3 – Act II 7

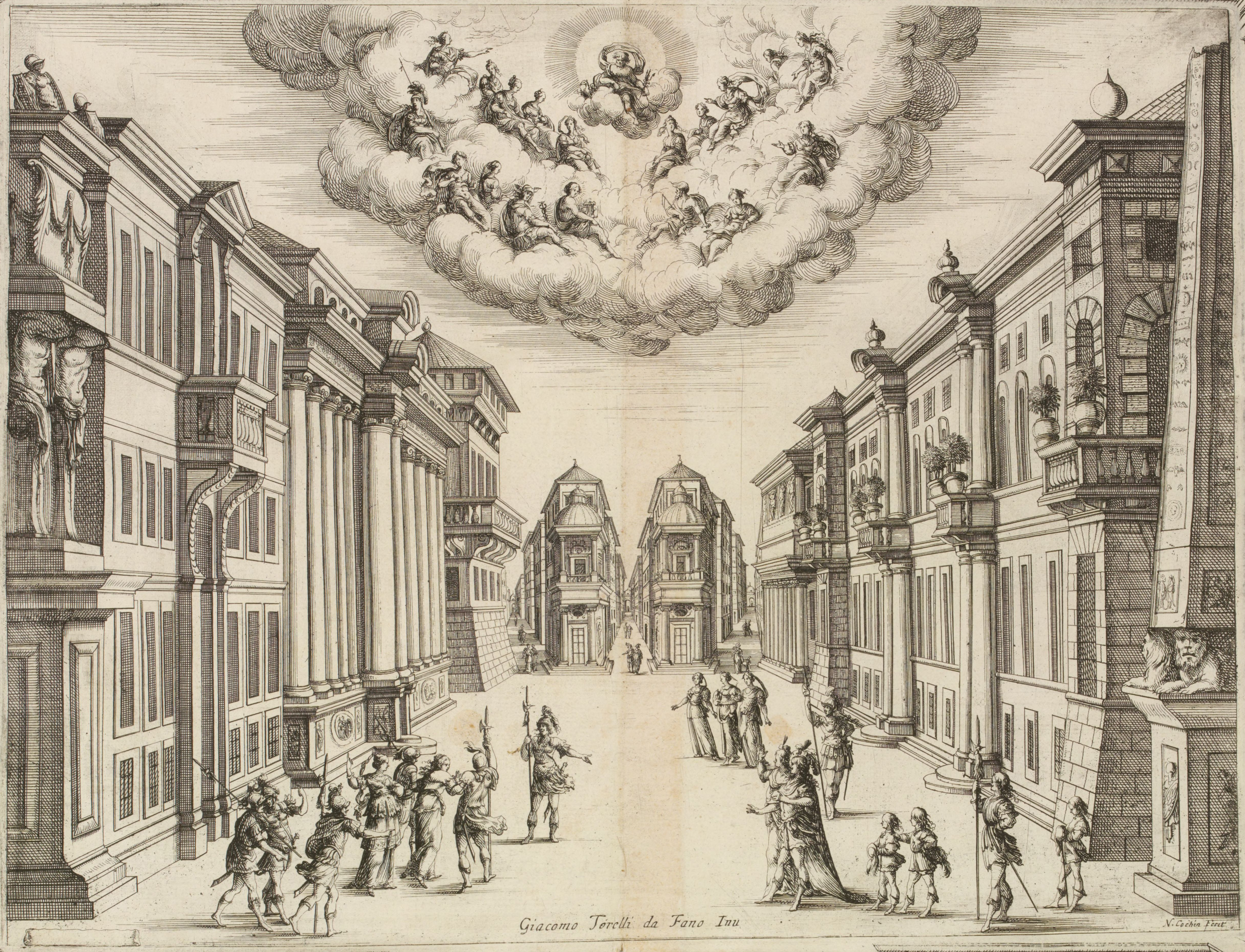
Act II 8 – Act III 4

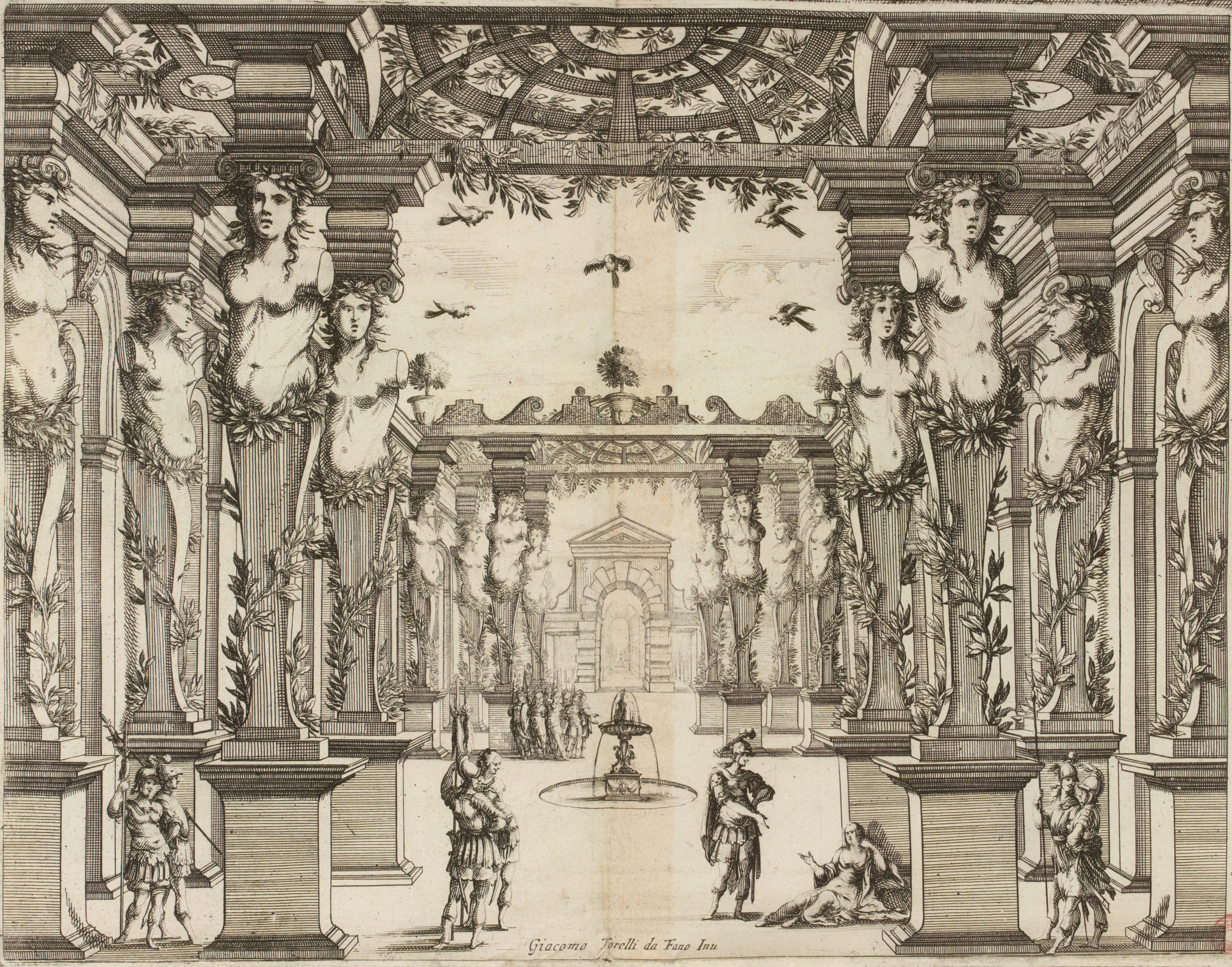
Act III 5–8

=== Aftermath and influence ===
Strozzi returned to the Teatro Santi Giovanni e Paolo for which he made two further operas, La finta savia and Romolo e Remo, which are considered to form a trilogy with La finta pazza, with stories about the origins of Venice (which was said to be related to the fall of Troy). Sacrati, Torelli and Renzi stayed with the Teatro Novissimo for new operas in 1642, but followed Strozzi to the Giovanni e Paolo in 1643. The Novissimo closed down in 1646.

La finta pazza is said to have been responsible for the use of disguise as a central plot element in many later operas, even though its "men-disguised-as-woman" theme was usually reversed in later works. Other aspects of the work which were highly influential include its use of song (with a character who is a singer), the plot element of sleep, and especially the use of madness. Real or feigned madness was used in many operas in the next fifteen years, starting already in 1641 with Didone by Francesco Cavalli, and with the end of the craze in 1657 with Le fortune di Rodope e Damira by Aurelio Aureli and Pietro Andrea Ziani, which was also the final role of Anna Renzi in Venice.

While the story of Achilles in Scyros was known since ancient times, it was the first time that it had been turned into an opera. The opera remained influential in the next century as well, when Pietro Metastasio created in 1736 his hugely popular libretto Achille in Sciro, which was set to music more than sixty times in the next hundred years. Metastasio countered the more comical and female-oriented approach of Strozzi with a text which was much more serious and used Achilles as the main role instead of Deidamia.

== Story ==
La finta pazza is a variation on the story of Achilles on Skyros, with Deidamia and Achilles as the main characters, and also starring Licomedes, Ulysses, Caronte and Diomedes. It is set on the island Skyros in the months before the start of the Trojan War. Deidamia is the secret lover of Achilles, and together they have a son, Pyrrhus. Achilles was sent to the island by his mother to avoid him being caught up in the Trojan War, and he lives there undercover, disguised as a princess. Ulysses and Diomedes, looking for allies in the war, have come to the island; when Achilles wants to join the war, Deidamia feigns madness to keep him on the island. In the end they marry and depart together.

== Recordings ==
=== Audio ===
- 2021: Cappella Mediterranea, conducted by Leonardo García Alarcón; Mariana Flores (Deidamia), Paul-Antoine Bénos-Djian (Achille), Carlo Vistoli (Ulisse), Valerio Contaldo (Diomede), Alejandro Meerapfel (Licomede), Kacper Szelążek (Eunuco), Marcel Beekman (Nodrice), Salvo Vitale (Capitano), Julie Roset (Aurora/Giunone), Fiona McGown (Tetide/Vittoria), Alexander Miminoshvili (Vulcano/Giove), Norma Nahoun (Fama/Minerva), Aurélie Marjot (Donzella 1), Anna Piroli (Donzella 2), Sarah Hauss (Donzella 3). Recorded from 9 to 13 June 2021 at the Royal Opera of Versailles. Château de Versailles Spectacles, 3 CDs.

=== Video ===
- 2022: Orchestre de l'Opéra Royal, conducted by Leonardo García Alarcón; Mariana Flores (Deidamia), Filippo Mineccia (Achille), Gabriel Jublin (Ulisse), Valerio Contaldo (Diomede), Alejandro Meerapfel (Licomede), Norma Nahoun (Minerva/La Fama), Kacper Szelążek (Eunuco), Marcel Beekman (Nodrice), Salvo Vitale (Capitano), Julie Roset (Aurora/Giunone), Fiona McGown (Tetide/Vittoria), Ruben Ruf (Pirro). Jean-Yves Ruf (stage director); a co-production of Château de Versailles Spectacles/Ozango. Recorded at the Royal Opera of Versailles. Streaming HD video (2h 48m): Medici.tv

== Bibliography ==
- Bjurström, Per (1962). Giacomo Torelli and Baroque Stage Design, second revised edition. Stockholm: Almquist & Wiksell. OCLC 515763843.
- Strozzi, Giulio (1641). La finta pazza. Venice: Giovanni Battista Surian. (The original 1641 libretto)
