= Anna Renzi =

17th-century Italian opera singer

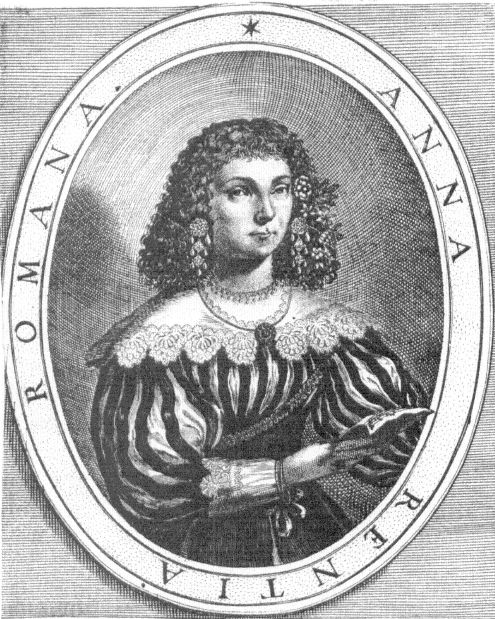
Anna Renzi

Anna Renzi (c. 1620 – after 1661) was an Italian soprano renowned for her acting ability as well as her voice, who has been described as the first diva in the history of opera.

== Career ==
Born in Rome, Anna Renzi was highly popular in Vienna in the 1640s and made her debut in 1640 at the Palazzo Pallavicini-Rospigliosi of the French ambassador, in the presence of Cardinal Richelieu, as Lucinda in Il favorito del principe (music lost) by it:Ottaviano Castelli and the young composer Filiberto Laurenzi who continued to function as her teacher and/or accompanist in later years. In 1641 she made her sensational Venetian debut as Deidamia, the title role of La finta pazza (The Feigned Madwoman) by Giulio Strozzi and Francesco Sacrati, which inaugurated the Teatro Novissimo, the sets designed by the celebrated stage designer Giacomo Torelli. In 1642, she created Archimene (probably doubling as Venere) in Il Bellerofonte (music lost) by Vincenzo Nolfi and Sacrati at the Novissimo, and in the same year Orazio Tarditi dedicated a collection of two- and three-part canzonette to her, which bears witness to her fame.

In 1643, she created two roles at the Teatro Santi Giovanni e Paolo: Aretusa, the title role of La finta savia (The Feigned Wise-Woman; music survives in excerpts) by Strozzi and Laurenzi, and Ottavia in L'incoronazione di Poppea by Giovanni Francesco Busenello and Claudio Monteverdi, in which opera she is also likely to have created the parts of La Virtù and Drusilla. In 1644, she returned to the Novissimo, creating the title role of La Deidamia (music lost) by Scipione Herrico and an unknown composer (possibly Laurenzi). In the same year, she was the subject of Le glorie della signora Anna Renzi romana, a collection of encomiums edited by Strozzi, which gives a vivid impression of her characteristics as a performer and of her effect on audiences. In 1645, she sang in Ercole in Lidia (music lost) by Maiolino Bisaccioni and Giovanni Rovetta at the same theatre, probably in the roles of Giunone and Fillide. In the same year, a marriage contract between Renzi and the Roman violinist Roberto Sabbatini was drawn up, but there is no evidence that the nuptials ever took place.

After the closing of the Novissimo, Renzi, who was by now the most celebrated and highest-paid singer of the age, turned to the Santi Giovanni e Paolo. In 1646 she probably sang in a revival of Poppea there, in 1648 she created the title role (probably doubling as a Villanella) in La Torilda (music lost) by Pietro Paolo Bissari and an unknown composer (possibly Francesco Cavalli), and in 1649 she apparently created the title role in Argiope (music lost) by Giovanni Battista Fusconi and Alessandro Leardini. In 1650 she sang in La Deidamia in Florence, and in 1652 she may have created the role of Cleopatra (probably doubling as Venere in the prologue) in Il Cesare amante (music lost) by Dario Varotari the Younger and Antonio Cesti at the Santi Giovanni e Paolo. In 1653 she seems to have sung in La Torilda and Il Cesare amante in Genoa, and in 1654 she sang in a revival of the latter opera (retitled La Cleopatra, perhaps in her honour) at the court theatre in Innsbruck. In 1655, she returned to Venice, apparently creating the title role (probably doubling as Giunone) in L'Eupatra (music lost) by Giovanni Faustini and Pietro Andrea Ziani at the Teatro Sant'Apollinare. Later that year she created the role of Dorisbe in L'Argia by Giovanni Filippo Apolloni and Cesti in Innsbruck: an opera commissioned by Ferdinand Charles, Archduke of Austria, in celebration of the conversion to Catholicism of Christina, Queen of Sweden, who was greatly pleased with Renzi's performance. In 1657, Renzi bade farewell to the stage as Damira (probably doubling as Giunone in the prologue) in Le fortune di Rodope e Damira by Aurelio Aureli and Ziani at the Sant' Apollinare. The last known reference to her stems from 1660.

== Renzi as a performer ==
Composers tended to make use of the full extent of Renzi's voice, which spanned from middle C to high B-flat, and the four surviving non-Monteverdian settings of roles written for her (by Sacrati, Laurenzi, Cesti and Ziani) are characterized by strong dramatic, emotional and stylistic contrasts, probably designed to show off her uncanny command of vocal and expressive means. Most of the thirteen leading roles she sang, and which were probably all written with her special gifts in mind, feature violent juxtapositions of comic and tragic scenes and moods, and they often involve disguises (in La Deidamia a lamenting princess disguises herself as a charming youth; in Argiope, L'Eupatra and Le fortune di Rodope e Damira a scheming princess or queen disguises herself as an ingenuous shepherdess), or other forms of deceit, such as feigned simplicity (Il favorito del principe and Il Bellerofonte), feigned madness (La finta pazza, L'Eupatra and Le fortune di Rodope e Damira), feigned piety (La finta savia) or feigned amorousness (L'Argia). Schneider argues that Renzi could hardly have been satisfied to sing only the role of Ottavia in Poppea, which is half the size of any other role written for her, lacks any hint of comedy, is dramatically and emotionally uniform, is set purely with recitative, and primarily explored the lower range of her voice, and hence he suggests that Ottavia and Drusilla may have been written for her as a virtuoso quick-change part. Strozzi described her art as follows in 1644:

The action that gives soul, spirit, and existence to things must be governed by the movements of the body, by gestures, by the face and by the voice, now raising it, now lowering it, becoming enraged and immediately becoming calm again; at times speaking hurriedly, at others slowly, moving the body now in one, now in another direction, drawing in the arms, and extending them, laughing and crying, now with little, now with much agitation of the hands. Our Signora Anna is endowed with such lifelike expression that her responses and speeches seem not memorised but born at the very moment. In sum, she transforms herself completely into the person she represents, and seems now a Thalia full of comic gaiety, now a Melpomene rich in tragic majesty.

== Sources ==
- Belgrano, Elisabeth: ″Lasciatemi Morire″ o farò ″La Finta Pazza″. Embodying vocal NOTHINGNESS on stage in Italian and French 17th century operatic LAMENTS and MAD SCENES, ArtMonitor, diss. Gothenburg, 2011
- Glixon, Beth L.: "Private Lives of Public Women: Prima Donnas in Mid-Seventeenth-Century Venice". Music & Letters, Vol. 76, No. 4 (November 1995), pp. 509–31.
- Glixon, Beth L. & Glixon, Jonathan E.: Inventing the Business of Opera: The Impresario and His World in Seventeenth-Century Venice, Oxford University Press, Oxford & New York 2006.
- Murata, Margaret: "Why the First Opera Given in Paris Wasn't Roman". Cambridge Opera Journal, Vol. 7, No. 2 (Jul., 1995), pp. 87–105.
- Wolfgang Osthoff: "Neue Beobachtungen zu Quellen und Geschichte von Monteverdis Incoronazione di Poppea". Die Musikforschung, 1958, No. 11, p. 129–38.
- Rosand, Ellen: Opera in Seventeenth-Century Venice: The Creation of a Genre, University of California Press, Berkeley 1991.
- Sartori, C.: "La prima diva della lirica italiana: Anna Renzi", Nuova Rivista Musicale Italiana (NRMI), ii (1968), 430–52
- Schneider, Magnus Tessing: "Seeing the Empress Again: On Doubling in L'incoronazione di Poppea". Cambridge Opera Journal, Vol. 24, No. 3 (Nov., 2012), pp. 249–91.
- Whenham, John: "Perspectives on the Chronology of the First Decade of Public Opera at Venice". Il saggiatore musicale, 2004, No. 11, pp. 253–302.
