= La finta savia =

1643 drama by Giulio Strozzi

cover of Strozzi's libretto

La finta savia is a 1643 drama by Giulio Strozzi written for the Teatro Santi Giovanni e Paolo with music by Filiberto Laurenzi. It is a sequel to Strozzi's La finta pazza (1641) whi was set to music by Francesco Sacrati. The music was mainly by Laurenzi but was supplemented in act 1 with scenes 3 to 5, 10 and 12 by Tarquinio Merula, in scene 6 mainly by Arcangelo Crivelli except for a canzonetta by Laurenzi. In act 1, scenes 2 and 3 were by Crivelli and in act 3 scenes 1 and 7 to 9 by Benedetto Ferrari.

== Recording ==
- Filiberto Laurenzi La finta savia – Arias, Elena Cecchi Fedi, Carlo Vistoli, Sezione Aurea Ensemble, Filippo Pantieri, Brilliant Classics 2018
