= Sacrati =

Sacrati is an Italian surname, ultimately derived from Latin săcrāti meaning "sanctified", "consecrated" or "initiated".

Notable people with this surname include:

- Alfonso Sacrati (1585–1647), Italian prelate
- Francesco Sacrati (1605-1650), Italian composer
- Francesco Sacrati (cardinal) (1567-1623), Italian cardinal
