= Filiberto Laurenzi =

Italian composer and harpsichordist

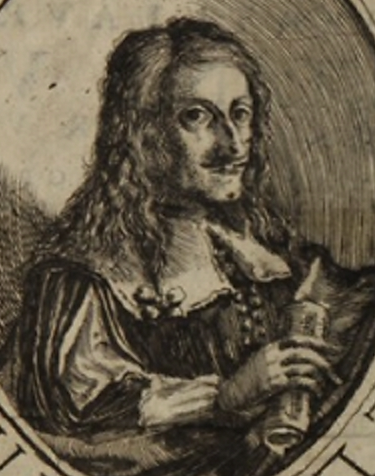
Filiberto Laurenzi

Filiberto Laurenzi (Bertinoro, 1618 – ...) was an Italian composer and harpsichordist. He was tutor and accompanist of soprano Anna Renzi for whom he wrote her debut work Il favorito del principe (1640, music lost). He followed her to Venice where he collaborated with Monteverdi in the composition of L'incoronazione di Poppea (1643), and was the main composer of La finta savia (also 1643) to a libretto by Giulio Strozzi. His Trionfo della fatica was performed in Rome in 1647.
