= Teatro Novissimo =

Former opera theatre (1641–1647) in Venice

Coordinates: 45°26′21″N 12°20′29″E

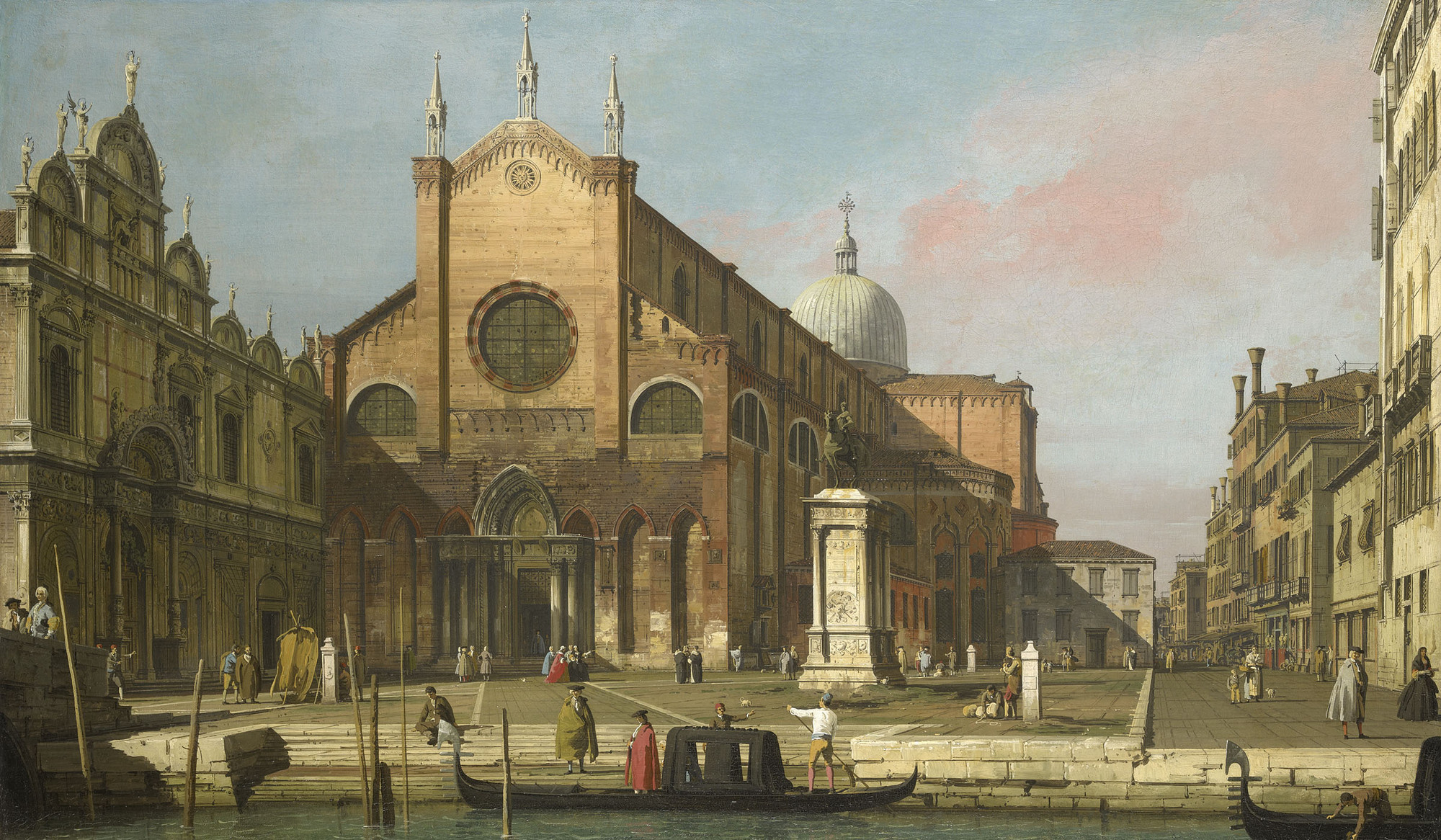
Canaletto's 1740 depiction of the Campo Santi Giovanni e Paolo, where the Teatro Novissimo once stood. It was demolished in 1647.

The Teatro Novissimo was a theatre in Venice located in the Campo Santi Giovanni e Paolo with its entrance on the Calle de Mendicanti. It was the first theatre built in Venice specifically for the performance of opera. Because it was purpose-built, it had a wider stage than its existing competitors which allowed for the elaborate productions which became the Novissimo's hallmark. The theatre opened in the Carnival season of 1641 with the premiere of Sacrati's opera La finta pazza. After its last production in 1645, the theatre was closed amidst mounting debts and was demolished in 1647.

== History ==
Public commercial opera had begun in Venice in 1637. By the time the Teatro Novissimo was conceived and planned three years later, there were already three theatres staging operas in the city, Teatro San Cassiano, Teatro Santi Giovanni e Paolo, and Teatro San Moisè. The Novissimo (the word means "Newest" in English) would be unique in that it was purpose-built for staging opera and, unlike the other three, was built and owned by a consortium rather than a single noble family. (Note: The San Cassiano was built and owned by the Tron family, the Santi Giovanni e Paolo by the Grimani family, and the San Moisè by the Giustiniani family.) The consortium consisted of the patrician Luigi Michiel and members of the Accademia degli Incogniti who included the librettists Giulio Strozzi, Giacomo Badoaro, and Giovanni Francesco Busenello.

On 30 May 1640 the consortium signed a contract with the Dominican friars of Santi Giovanni e Paolo allowing them to construct and operate a theatre on land adjacent to the monastery which at the time was occupied by a large shed. The contract stipulated that the new theatre would be only used for the performances of "heroic" operas, not comedies. Girolamo Lappoli, a businessman from Arezzo, was also involved in the project as the theatre's impresario and later claimed to have "built" the theatre. By October 1640, the composer Francesco Sacrati and the stage designer and architect Giacomo Torelli had joined the project along with the Venetian noblemen Gerolamo Landò, Giacomo Marcello, and Giacomo da Mosto who provided further financing. Torelli would not only create the sets and stage machinery, but also design the theatre itself. The stage, almost 11 metres wide, was able to accommodate Torelli's complex stage sets and machinery which would characterise the theatre's productions.

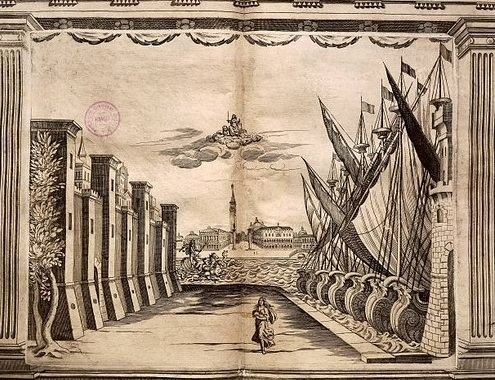
One of Torelli's set designs for the Teatro Novissimo depicting the City of Venice

The Teatro Novissimo was inaugurated in the Carnival season of 1641 with the premiere of La finta pazza composed by Francesco Sacrati to a libretto by Giulio Strozzi with elaborate stage machinery by Giacomo Torelli. According to Ellen Rosand, it "became the first and possibly the greatest operatic 'hit' of the century". Unusually for the time, the complete libretto was published prior to the opening night, and the performances were also advertised through the writings of various members of the Incogniti. The libretto itself contained paeans to the opera's star singer Anna Renzi and the "magical effects" of its stage designs.

Following the run of La finta pazza a 55-page book, Cannocchiale per la finta pazza, written by another Incognito, Maiolino Bisaccioni, gave a detailed account of the opera's visual effects. The "cannocchiale" ("telescope") of the title refers to the book's stated purpose of providing a description of the visual effects not only for those who had been unable to attend, but also for those who had been seated far from the stage, implying that the Novissimo was probably a fairly large theatre. According to Rosand, the book also explicitly asserted for the first time the relationship between opera itself and "the miraculous city of Venice". The theme was continued in Bisaccioni's Apparati scenici per lo Teatro Novissimo di Venetia. Printed in 1644, the text was illustrated with plates showing Torelli's set designs for the theatre's 1643 production of Sacrati's Venere gelosa and the 1644 production of Cavalli's Deidemia.

The 1645 season, which saw the premiere of Rovetta's Ercole in Lidia, proved to be the theatre's last. (Note: For John Evelyn's description of the 1645 production of Ercole in Lidia, the music for which is now lost, see Carter, Tim (2005). The Cambridge History of Seventeenth-Century Music, vol. 1, p. 246. Cambridge University Press. ISBN 0521792738) Debts had continued to mount and the friars were pressing for the return of their land. Girolamo Lappoli ceded the theatre to Maiolino Bisaccioni in May of that year. Several investors plus Giacomo Torelli, Paulo Morandi (the theatre's costume designer), and four singers, including Anna Renzi, sued Lappoli for unpaid debts and wages in the summer of 1645. The following year, Lappoli left Venice with his debts unpaid. The friars re-possessed the theatre and had it demolished in October 1647. In 1648 an equestrian school and stables were constructed on the site.

== Opera premieres ==
- Francesco Sacrati's La finta pazza; libretto by Giulio Strozzi; Carnival, 1641
- Francesco Manelli's Alcate; libretto by Marcantonio Tirabosco; Carnival, 1642
- Sacrati's Bellerofonte; libretto by Vincenzo Nolfi; Carnival, 1642
- Sacrati's Venere gelosa; libretto by Niccolò Enea Bartolini; January, 1643
- Francesco Cavalli's Deidemia; libretto by Scipione Errico; January, 1644
- Giovanni Rovetta's Ercole in Lidia; libretto by Maiolino Bisaccioni; 1645
