= Giacomo Torelli =

Italian painter

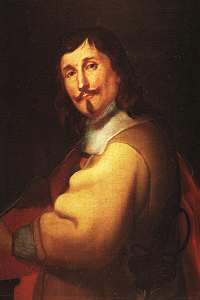
- Portrait of Giacomo Torelli. Unknown author of the 17th century. Work exhibited at the civic museum of Fano
- Born: 1 September 1608; Fano
- Died: 17 June 1678 (aged 69); Fano
- Occupations: Scenographer; Scenery painter; Engineer; Architect

Giacomo Torelli (1 September 1608 – 17 June 1678) was an Italian stage designer, scenery painter, engineer, and architect. His work in stage design, particularly his designs of machinery for creating spectacular scenery changes and other special effects, was extensively engraved and hence survives as the most complete record of mid-seventeenth-century set design.

== Biography ==
=== Early life and career in Italy ===
Torelli was born in Fano, where he may have first worked on amateur theatre productions at the commune's Palazzo della Ragione, and he may also have gained experience in theatre design in nearby Pesaro or Urbino. His first documented work was in January 1641 for the opening of the Teatro Novissimo in Venice, where he was involved in the design of scenery and stage machinery for Francesco Sacrati's opera La finta pazza. This was followed by designs for two other works by Sacrati at the same theatre, Bellerofonte in 1642 and Venere gelosa in January 1643. He may also have worked on Francesco Cavalli's Deidamia, staged in 1644, also at the Teatro Novissimo. Torelli's last work in Venice was for Sacrati's L'Ulisse errante, performed during the carnival season of 1644 at the Teatro Santi Giovanni e Paolo.

=== Career in France ===
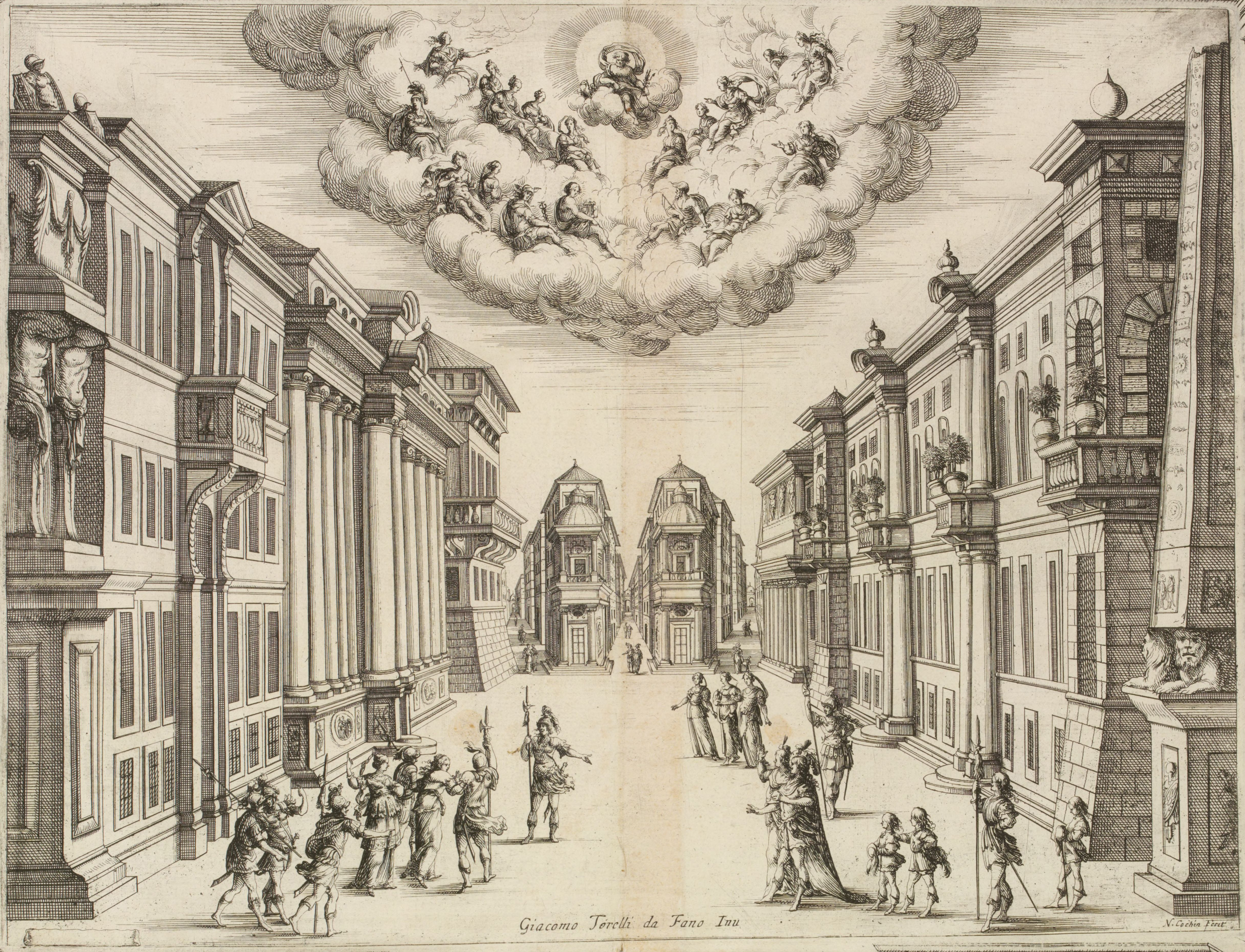
Set design for La finta pazza (Paris, 1645)

When the Italian-born Cardinal Mazarin succeeded Cardinal Richelieu as the chief minister of France in 1642, he decided to introduce Italian opera to Paris. In June 1645, at the request of the regent Anne of Austria, the Duke of Parma sent Torelli to France to work on a production of La finta pazza in which Torelli largely repeated his designs for Venice. Mazarin had recruited Italian singers from Florence, but catering to French taste, comic ballet interludes choreographed by Giambattista Balbi replaced the choruses at the ends of the acts, and some of the recitative was spoken rather than sung. Performed in the large hall of the Petit-Bourbon beginning on 14 December 1645, the production was a great success, and the spectacular scenic effects created by Torelli were received with enthusiasm.

The success of La finta pazza encouraged Mazarin's ambitions, and he proceeded to mount another Italian opera, Egisto. Although the composer has not been identified with certainty, it is considered likely to have been the Egisto with music by Francesco Cavalli. According to the memoirs of Madame de Motteville, the opera was given in the smaller theatre of the Palais-Royal, but it is now believed that it was presented in the larger theatre in the east wing, and that Torelli made alterations for the installation of stage machinery. Egisto was performed in 1646, but was not as successful as La finta pazza.

Nevertheless, Mazarin proceeded with a newly composed Italian opera, Luigi Rossi's Orfeo. Torelli worked with the French stage designer Charles Errard and his assistants Noël Coypel and Gilbert de Sève in creating the sets and scenic effects, and more extensive alterations for the installation of the stage machinery were made to the Palais-Royal theatre, where the opera was to be performed. Another group of Italian singers was brought to France, and after many delays Orfeo finally premiered on 2 March 1647. By this time, opposition to Italian opera (and Mazarin) was beginning to arise, and the work was criticised for being too Italian and too costly, but even so, Torelli's scenic effects were well received.

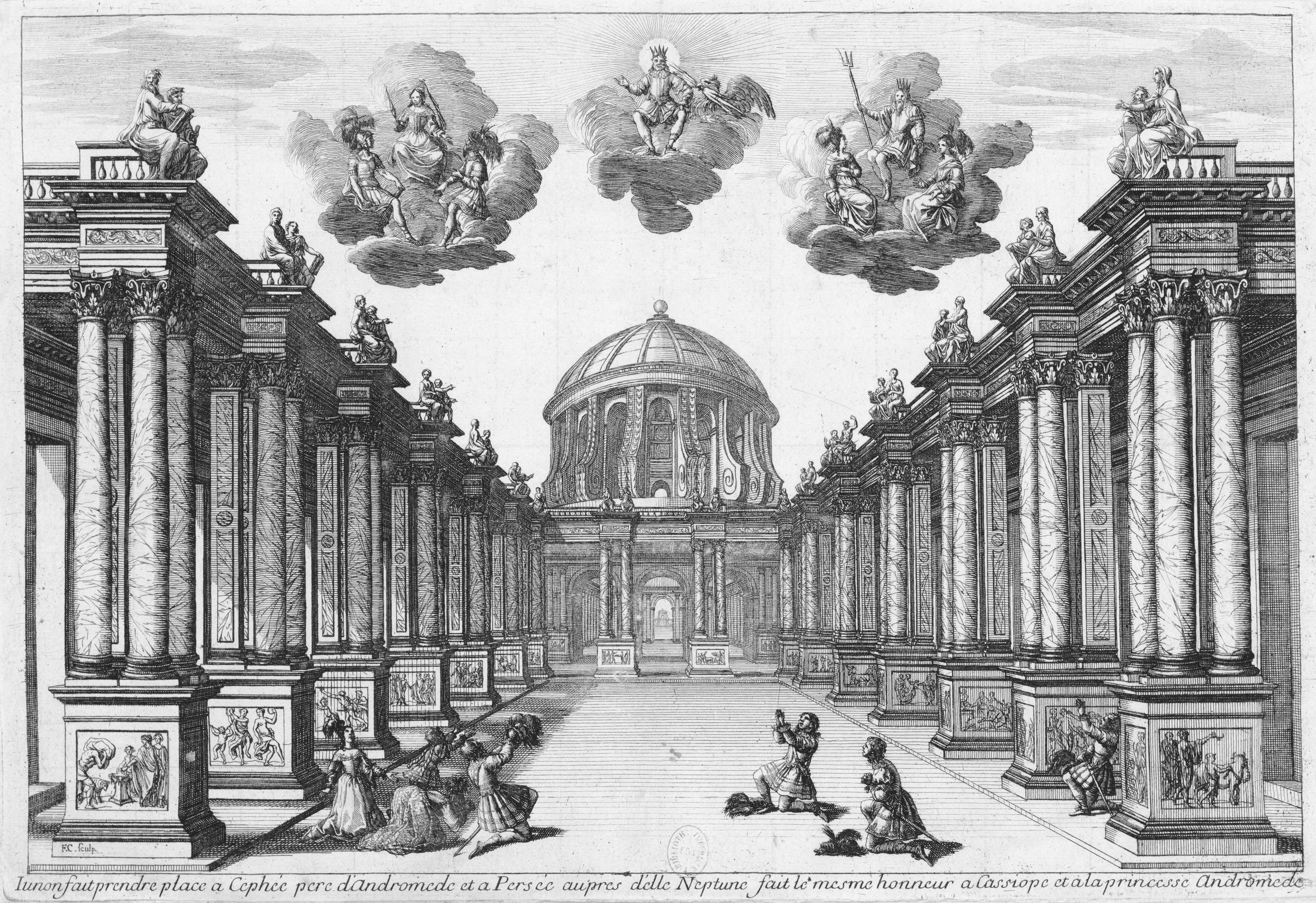
Torelli's set design for Act 5 of Pierre Corneille's Andromède as performed at the Petit-Bourbon in 1650

Although ostracised as a dependant of Mazarin during the Fronde (1648–1653), Torelli managed to stay in Paris and designed the scenery for a new French play, Pierre Corneille's Andromède (with music by Dassoucy). The Troupe Royale of the Hôtel de Bourgogne were to perform it, but their usual stage was unsuitable for the scene-shifting machinery and special effects of a pièce à machine. Originally planned for the theatre in the Palais-Royal, Andromède was transferred sometime before the first performance to the Petit-Bourbon, which could accommodate a larger audience. Many of Torelli's set pieces created for Orfeo were moved and reused for Andromède, which premiered on 1 February 1650. François Chauveau engraved a series of six depictions of the settings of the prologue and five acts, which were published at Rouen in 1651, both separately and with the second edition of the play.

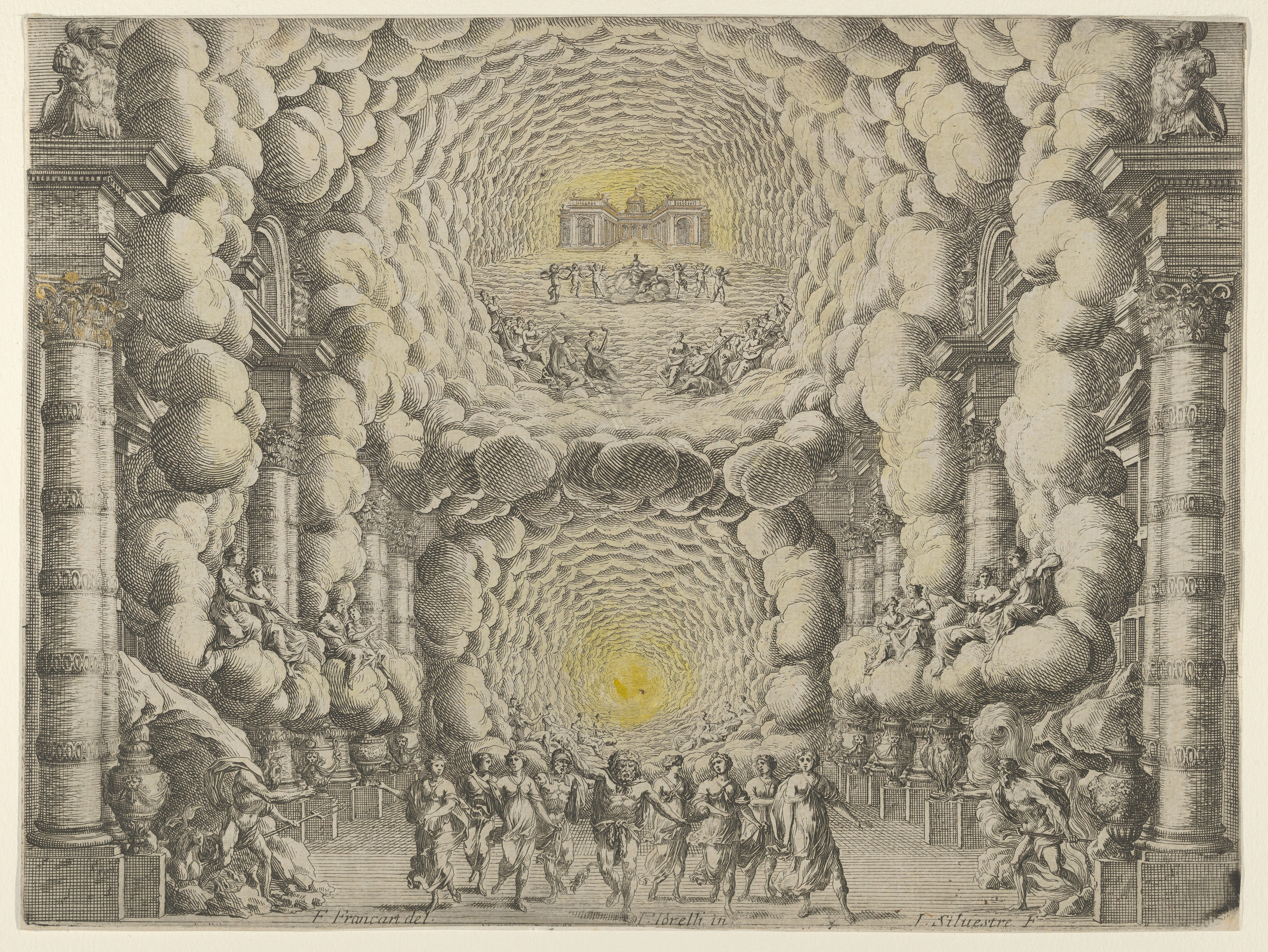
Design for a theater set created by Giacomo Torelli da Fano for the ballet 'Les Noces de Thétis', from 'Décorations et machines aprestées aux nopces de Tétis, Ballet Royal' 1654

After King Louis XIV's return to Paris in 1653, Torelli became involved more in ballet de cour than in opera, reflecting the passion of the king for dancing. He has traditionally been credited with the designs for the Ballet de la Nuit, performed on 23 February 1653 at the Petit-Bourbon, although there is no definitive evidence for it. In 1659, with the arrival in Paris of the Italian theatre-designing family of Gaspare Vigarani and his sons Carlo and Lodovico, Torelli soon fell from royal favour. Torelli's career in France came to a definitive end in 1661, when he worked on sets for Molière's Les fâcheux, presented by Nicholas Fouquet as part of his grand fête at Vaux-le-Vicomte in honour of the King, an overly ostentatious display which ultimately led to Fouquet's imprisonment.

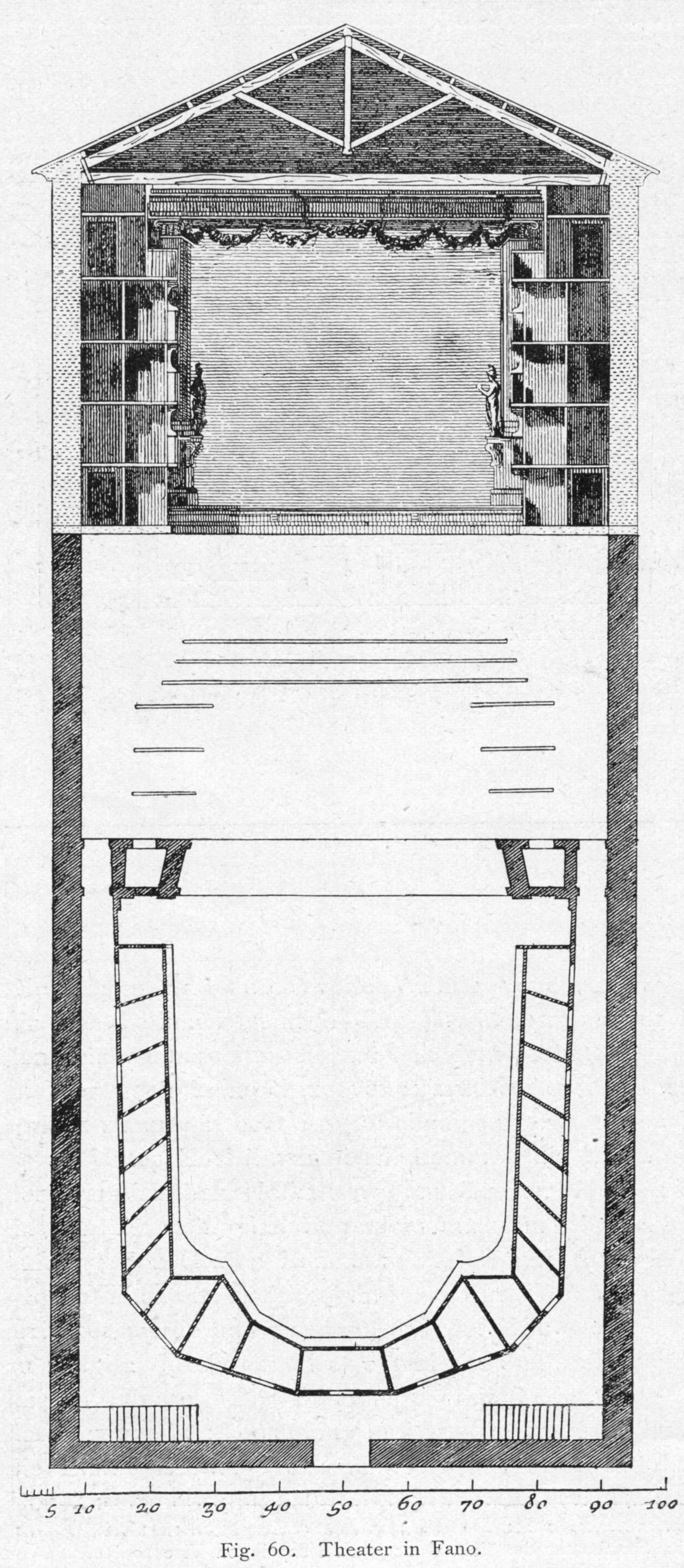
Teatro di Fano (designed by Torelli)

=== Return to Italy ===
Torelli returned to Fano, designing a theatre, the Teatro della Fortuna, and a final stage setting for Il trionfo della continenza in 1677. He died in Fano in 1678.

== Accomplishments ==
Torelli's most significant innovation was the Pole and Chariot system of stage machinery, consisting of sub-stage trolleys connected by ropes to a central drum, that allowed multiple flats to be changed quickly in full view of the audience in a highly coordinated manner by a single assistant under the stage, rather than slowly by a crew of as many as sixteen stagehands. This not only saved labour, amongst other things, but also created spectacular scenic effects, the popularity of which led to a notable increase in the number of set changes per opera. Torelli also designed machinery for flying characters around the stage, mimicking weather effects, and so on, and was nicknamed the 'grand stregone' (great magician).

Torelli brought the one-point-perspective set to its apogee with designs that revelled in a use of perspective that drew the eye to the horizon and beyond: the theatre stage seemed to extend to infinity. Despite this apparent obsession with the infinite, however, Torelli also brought 'closed' space to the stage. Interior scenes became more common and were often quite shallow. His innovations in stage machinery allowed not only stage flats to be changed, but also the borders of the sky. This allowed an interchange between interior and exterior sets, and Torelli would often alternate between open and enclosed sets to create a new sense of rhythm in the visual aspect of opera. His experimentation with different types of stage spaces was not limited to the contrast between interior and exterior either. Torelli would often delimit the foreground of an exterior set with a structure such as a hill or a fountain, allowing the audience only glimpses of the background perspective.

When the Petit-Bourbon was demolished in 1660 for the eastward expansion of the Louvre, Vigarani managed to acquire Torelli's stage machines; he destroyed them rather than install them in his new Salle des Machines in the Palais des Tuileries, but Torelli's drawings survived and were reproduced in Diderot's Encyclopédie under the article "Machines du Théâtre" in 1772. Torelli is also thought to have been the anonymous author of a severe critique of Vigarani's theatre at the Tuileries, Reflessioni sopra la fabrica del nuovo teatro.

== Bibliography ==
- AA.VV. (a cura di Massimo Puliani) (1996). Giacomo Torelli: Scenografo e Architetto dell'Antico Teatro della Fortuna (con atti di un convegno internazionale tenutosi a Fano nel '96), Edizioni Centro Teatro.
- Aronson, Arnold; Roy, Donald (1995). "Torelli, Giacomo" in Banham 1995, pp. 1116–1117.
- Banham, Martin (1995). The Cambridge Guide to the Theatre, second edition. Cambridge, England: Cambridge University Press. ISBN 9780521434379.
- Benezit 2006. "Torelli, Giacomo Cavalein", vol. 13, p. 1074, in Benezit Dictionary of Artists. Paris: Gründ.
- Bjurström, Per (1962). Giacomo Torelli and Baroque Stage Design, 2nd revised edition, translated from the Swedish. Stockholm: Almqvist & Wiksell. OCLC 10226792.
- Bryan, Michael (1889). Dictionary of Painters and Engravers, Biographical and Critical. Vol. II: L-Z, new edition, revised and enlarged, edited by Walter Armstrong & Robert Edmund Graves. London: George Bell and Sons. View at Internet Archive. View at Google Books.
- Coeyman, Barbara (1998). "Opera and Ballet in Seventeenth-Century French Theatres: Case Studies of the Salle des Machines and the Palais Royal Theatre" in Radice 1998, pp. 37–71.
- Howarth, William D., editor (1997). French Theatre in the Neo-classical Era, 1550–1789. Cambridge: Cambridge University Press. ISBN 9780521100878.
- John, Richard (1998). "Torelli, Giacomo" in Turner 1998, vol. 31, pp. 165–166.
- Lawrenson, T. E. (1986). The French Stage and Playhouse in the XVIIth Century: A Study in the Advent of the Italian Order, second edition, revised and enlarged. New York: AMS Press. ISBN 9780404617219.
- Milesi, Francesco (2000). Giacomo Torelli: l'invenzione scenica nell'Europa barocca (catalog of an exhibition held in Fano, Italy, 8 July – 30 September 2000, in Italian). Fano: Fondazione Cassa di Risparmio di Fano. OCLC 45215348.
- Murata, Margaret (1992). "Orfeo (ii)" in Sadie 1992, vol. 3, p. 743.
- Powell, John S. (2000). Music and Theatre in France 1600–1680. Oxford: Oxford University Press. ISBN 9780198165996.
- Radice, Mark A., editor (1998). Opera in Context: Essays on Historical Staging from the Late Renaissance to the Time of Puccini. Portland, Oregon: Amadeus Press. ISBN 9781574670325.
- Sadie, Stanley, editor (1992). The New Grove Dictionary of Opera (4 volumes). London: Macmillan. ISBN 9781561592289.
- Turner, Jane, editor (1998). The Dictionary of Art, reprinted with minor corrections, 34 volumes. New York: Grove. ISBN 9781884446009.
- Walker, Thomas; Branconi, Lorenzo (1992). "Sacrati, Francesco" in Sadie 1992, vol. 4, pp. 117–118.
- Whenham, John (1992). "Strozzi, Giulio" in Sadie 1992, vol. 4, pp. 586–587.
