= Teatro della Fortuna =

Music and theater venue

Coordinates: 43.843811°N 13.017811°E

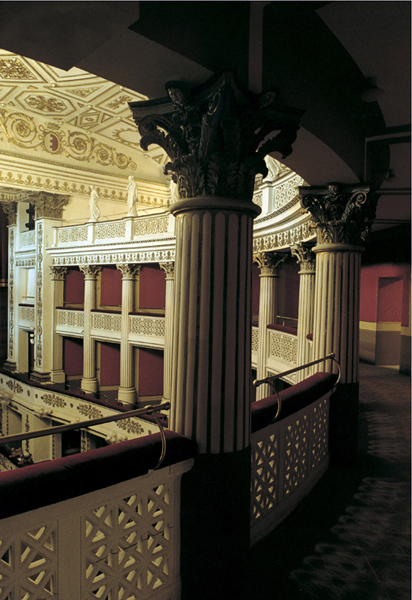
Interior of present theater by Gianni Fabbri

The Teatro della Fortuna is a music and theater venue (opera house) in Fano, province of Pesaro and Urbino, region of Marche, Italy.

The present building is, in general, the result of at least two nearly complete reconstructions. A palace built in 1299 at this site housed the Palazzo del Podestà of Fano. It was converted into a theater by the scenographer and entrepreneur Giacomo Torelli between 1665 and 1677. In 1839, that theater was closed due to the deterioration in the architecture and replaced in 1845-1869 by a new opera house designed by Luigi Poletti. That theater was severely damaged and nearly burned down in 1944 due to bombardments during the Second World War. After a laborious restoration in 1998 the theater was reopened. In recent years, the theater has hosted visiting performances from the Rete Lirica delle Marche.

The main hall, the Sala Poletti, recalls the Neoclassical-style of the Poletti-designed opera house, but updated in various forms. The ceiling has a concentric crown motive with a repainted copy of the original fresco of the Fasti di Apollo painted by Francesco Grandi. Grandi also designed the sipario or theater curtain that depicts the Entrance of the Emperor Caesar Augustus into the ancient Colonia Iulia Fanestris. Other less well preserved lunettes by Gioachino and Mariano Grassi are in the vaults of the first atrium. There are a few remnants of the 16th-century frescoes once found in the loggia of the Palazzo del Podestà.

A second Verdi Hall is used for concerts, conferences, and cultural events; the auditorium was designed by architect Gianni Fabbri.

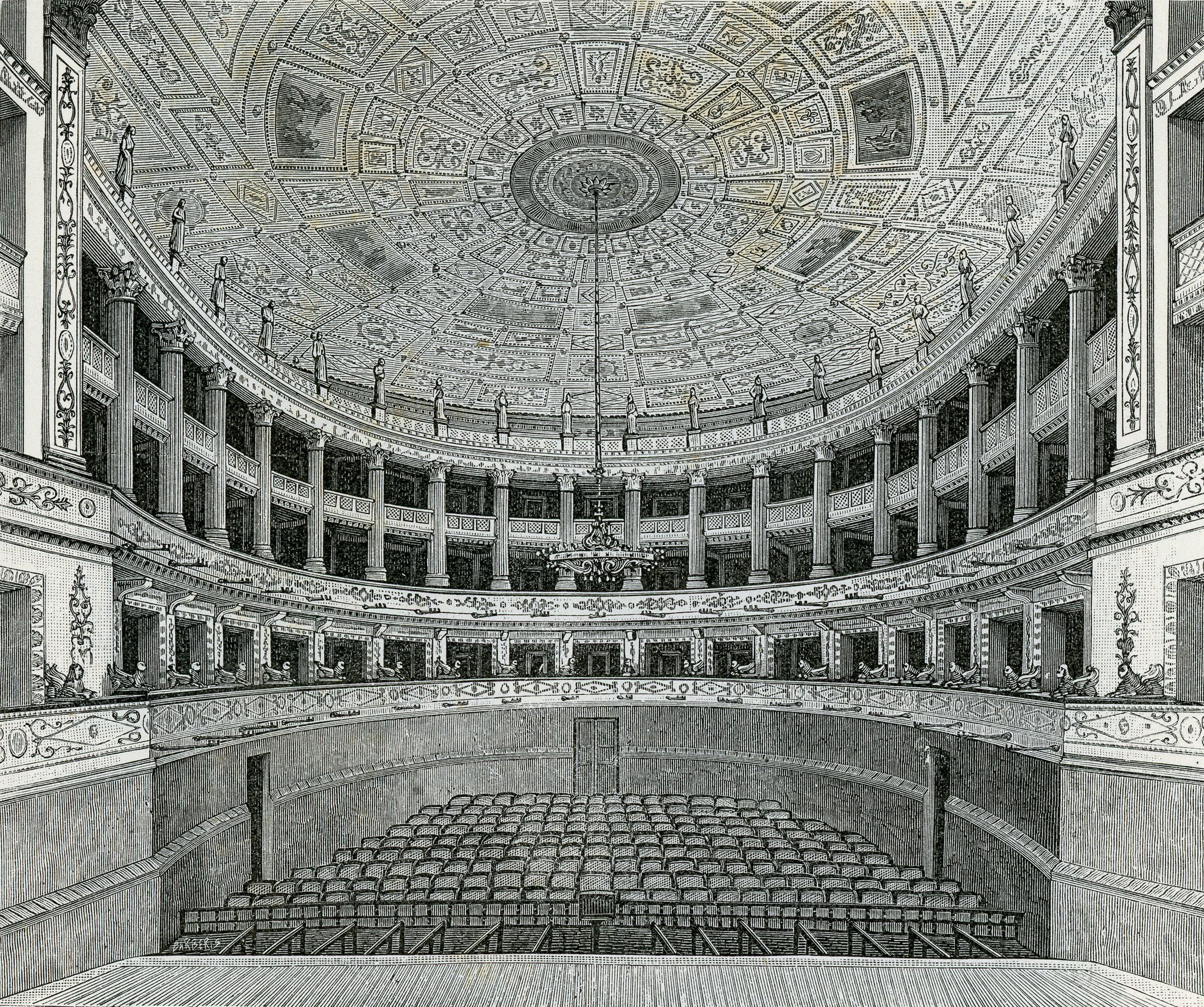
Interior plan of Theater

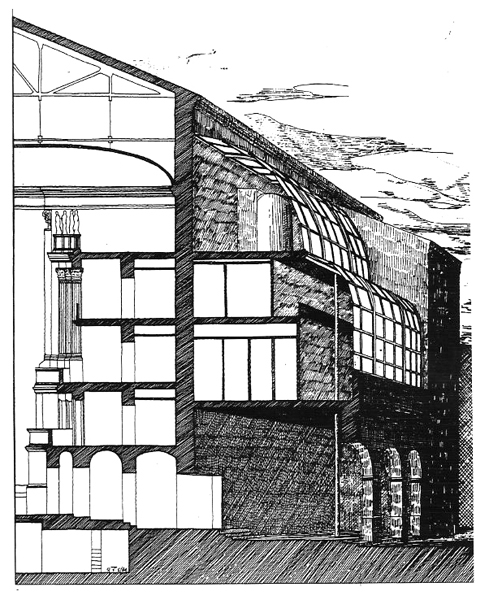

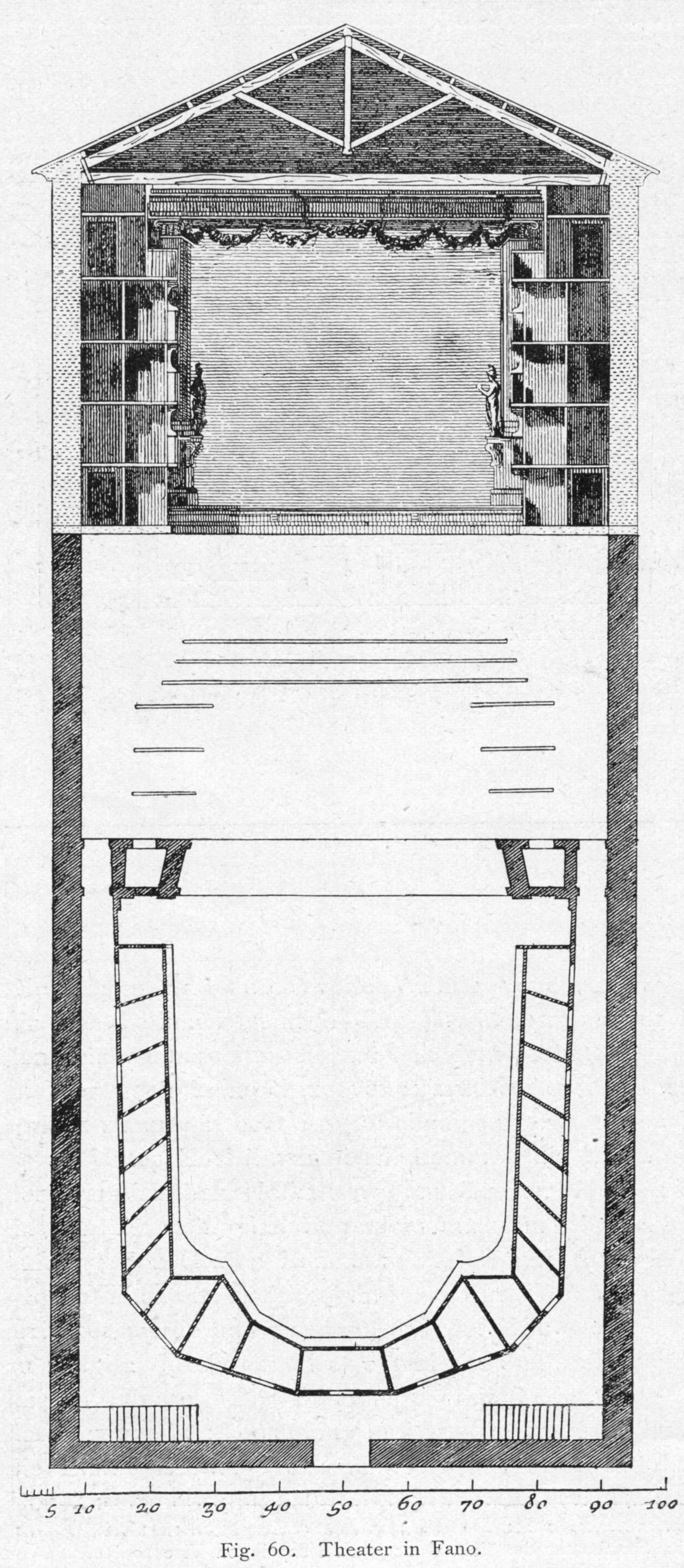
Teatro di Fano
(designed by Torelli)
