= Totila (opera) =

1677 opera by Giovanni Legrenzi

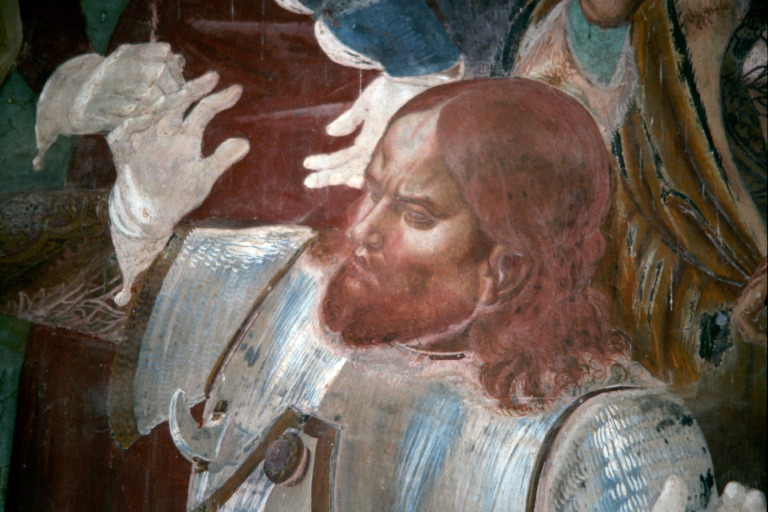
Totila, King of the Ostrogoths, as portrayed by Luca Signorelli

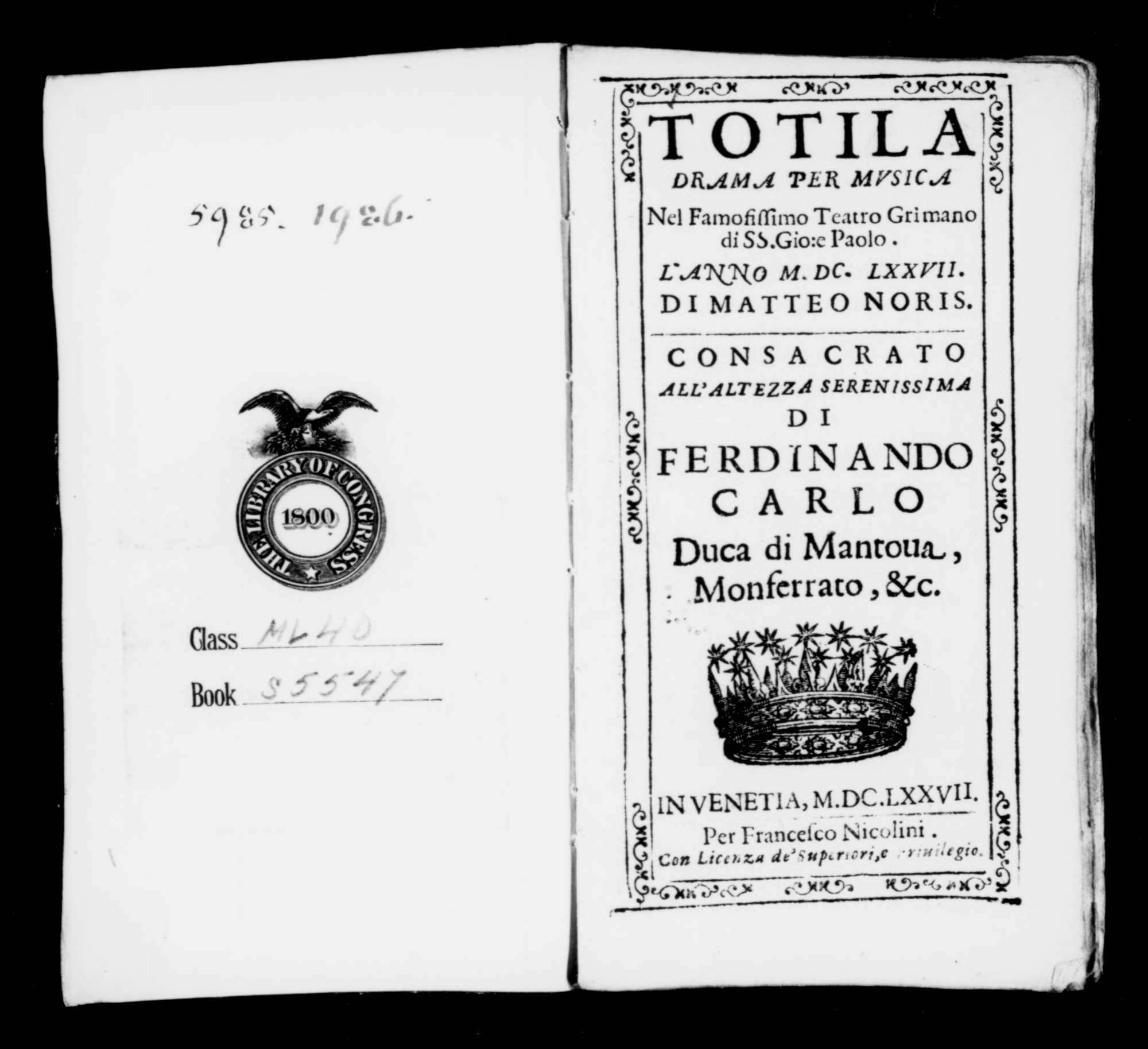
Frontispiece of the libretto for Legrenzi's 'Totila'

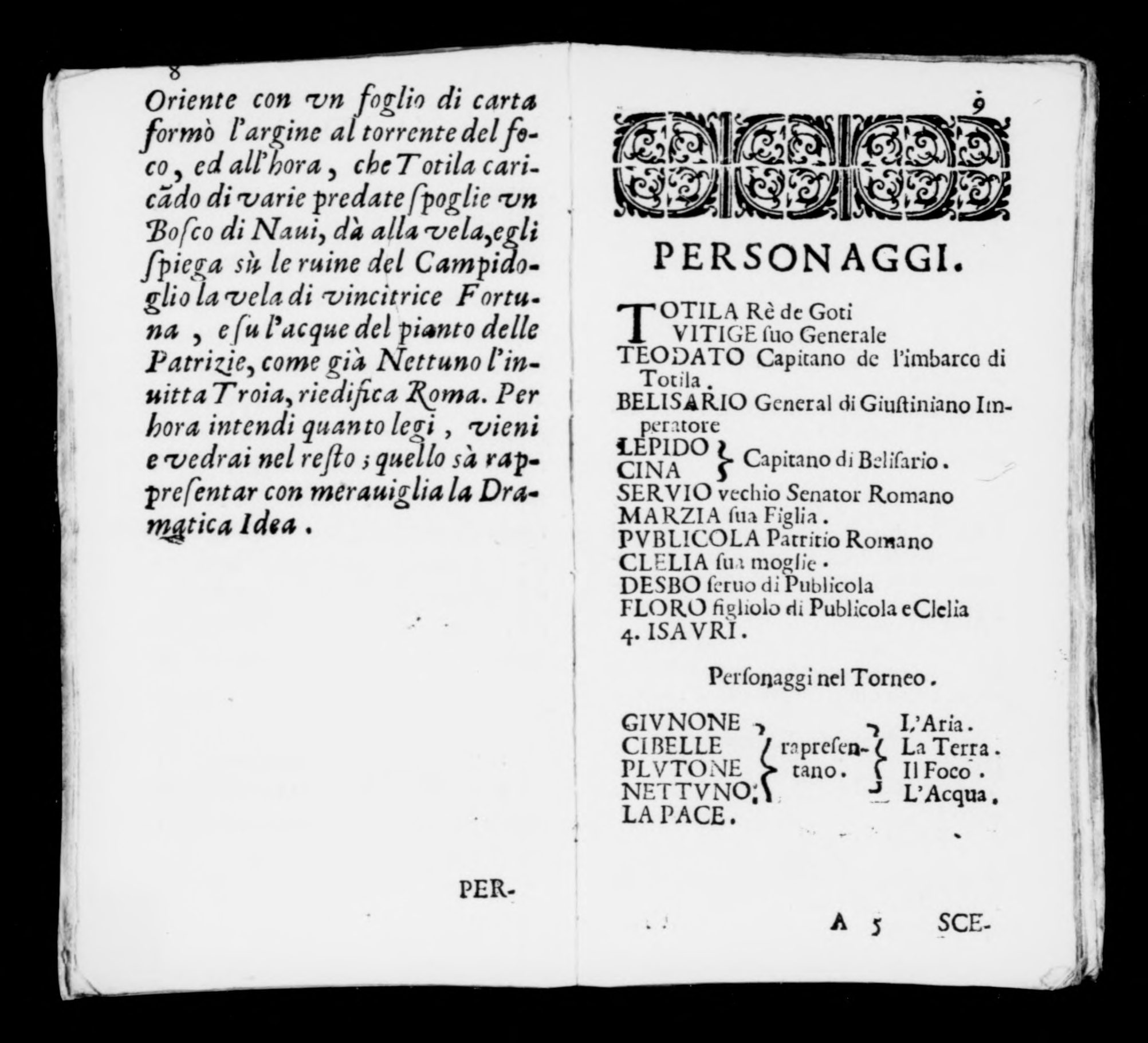
List of roles in Legrenzi's 'Totila'

Totila is an opera by Giovanni Legrenzi, written in 1677 to a libretto by Matteo Noris and first performed at the Teatro Santi Giovanni e Paolo in Venice. Another opera called "Totila in Roma", based on the same libretto, was written by Francesco Gasparini and first performed at the Teatro Santa Cecilia in Palermo.

== Roles ==
The singing roles in the opera are: Belisario (tenor), Cinna (tenor), Clelia (soprano), Desbo (alto), Floro (soprano), first Isaurian (soprano), second Isaurian (alto), Lepidus (soprano), Marzia (soprano), Publicola (alto), Servio (bass), Theodatus (bass), Totila (soprano), Vitige (mezzo-soprano).

== Plot ==
The action is set in the Gothic Wars and is based on the conflict between king Totila of the Ostrogoths and the Byzantine general Belisarius. In reality Totila sacked Rome twice, in 546 and again in 550 but the libretto is not specific about whether the action is meant to take place in either of these two events or in an amalgam of them.

In the first act, set in Rome under siege, Clelia, wife of the consul Publicola, plans to resist Vitige and shows that she is willing to kill her sleeping child to prevent him falling into the hands of the invaders and then to commit suicide. There is then a scene in which the Goths put Rome to the torch. Marzia throws herself from a window and falls into the arms of Totila, who falls in love with her and has her father senator Servius arrested. A comic interlude follows in which the servant Desbo mistakenly informs Publicola that Clelia is dead; he then loses his mind and rails against poor Desbo, who tries to defend herself. Clelia, meanwhile, has decided to offer herself to Vitige in return for her freedom, but he is moved to spare her. The first act ends with spectacular stage effects as a trumpet sounds, a giant elephant opens, and Belisario, Lepido and Cinna come out.

The second act opens with a scene of Publicola's melancholy and madness. Another scene depicts Marzia boarding Totila's ship. The woman makes fun of Totila but when he tries to kiss her, she rejects him. Totila, furious, then has Marzia bound to a ship's mast. Belisario and Lepido arrive and battle with Totila as a storm rages. Totila's ship sinks and Marzia is rescued by Lepidus. Clelia, disguised as a soldier, challenges Vitige to a duel but he recognizes her and declares his love; she rejects him again. Belisario imprisons Vitige and frees Servius, while Totila is believed to be dead.

In the third act Totila, in disguise, orders Vitige to kill Belisario but he refuses, moved by the general's magnanimity. Publicola and Desbo appear in another comic interlude: in his delusion Publicola mistakes Desbo for Narciso and tries to seduce him. Desbo escapes, pursued by Publicola who, armed with a bow, wounds Totila. Belisarius arrives but, instead of killing Totila, helps him. Clelia and Publicola reunite, while Belisario and Lepido declare themselves willing to renounce their love for Marzia, if Totila will become a vassal of Giustiniano.

== Music ==
Legrenzi's writing for the opera has several noteworthy points, including the expression of jealousy through the juxtaposition of a constant bass overlapping with a slower-moving vocal line, and the use of trumpet arias as well as vocal imitations of them to reflect the military setting of the action. He also managed to include elements of comedy within an opera seria.

Legrenzi's music depicts the four leading roles as distinctive types. Belisarius embodies generosity and magnanimity and his arias are heroic in character while Totila, his opposite, is prone to violence. The delineation of the female lead roles is similarly clear. Clelia's conduct is unwaveringly moral; in contrast Marzia makes fun of Totila and mocks her own destiny, but eventually surrenders to both.
