= Teatro Santi Giovanni e Paolo =

Former theatre (1683–1715) in Venice

Teatro SS. Giovanni e Paolo
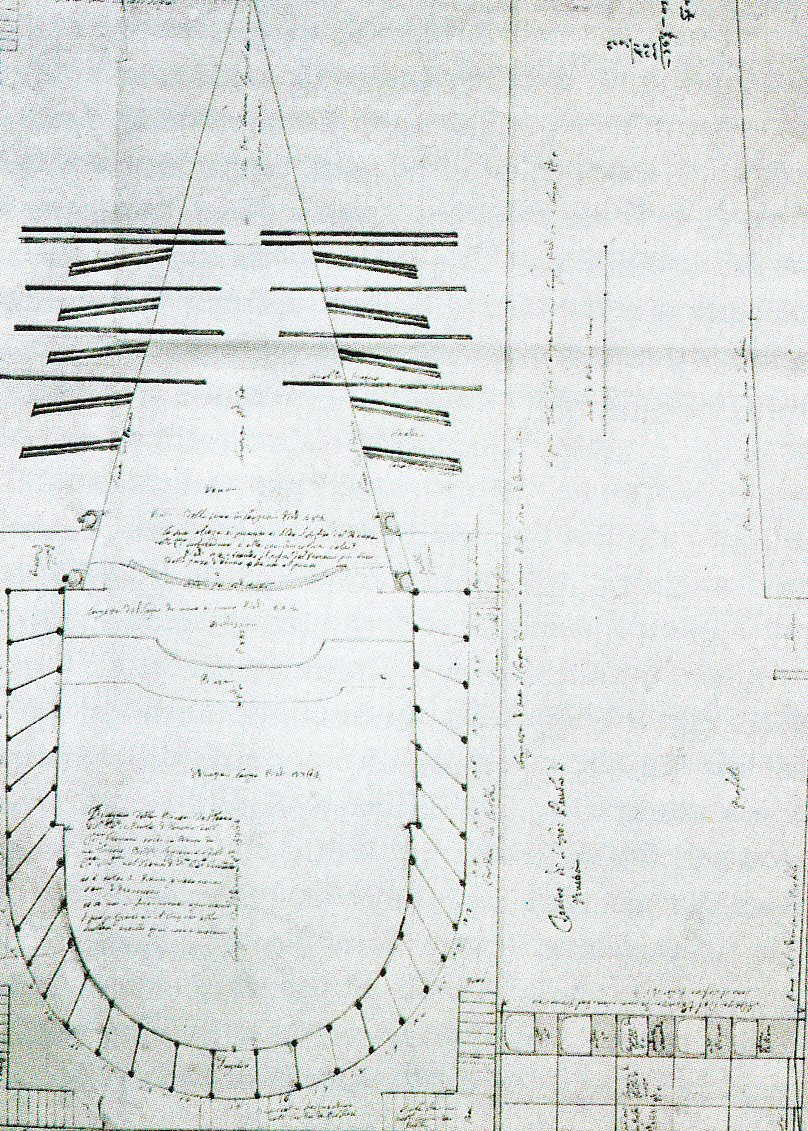
- Carlo Fontana's 1654 sketch of the theatre's floor plan
- Interactive map of Teatro SS. Giovanni e Paolo
- Address: Venice; Italy
- Coordinates: 45°26′N 12°20′E
- Type: Theatre and opera house

Construction
- Opened: 1638
- Closed: 1715
- Architect: Carlo Fontana

The Teatro Santi Giovanni e Paolo (often written as Teatro SS. Giovanni e Paolo) was a theatre and opera house in Venice located on the Calle della Testa, and takes its name from the nearby Basilica of Santi Giovanni e Paolo, Venice. Built by the Grimani family in 1638, in its heyday it was considered the most beautiful and comfortable theatre in the city. The theatre played an important role in the development of opera and saw the premieres of several works by Francesco Cavalli, as well as Monteverdi's Il ritorno d'Ulisse in patria and L'incoronazione di Poppea.

== History ==
The Grimani family originally built the theatre as a wooden structure on the Fondamenta Nuove around 1635. It was then rebuilt on a grander scale using both stone and wood in 1638 when it moved to the nearby Calle della Testa. It was built primarily for the performance of spoken drama, but from the very beginning operas were also performed there. In fact, the new theatre was inaugurated on 20 January 1639 with the premiere performance of Francesco Manelli's opera La Delia o sia La sera sposa del sole.

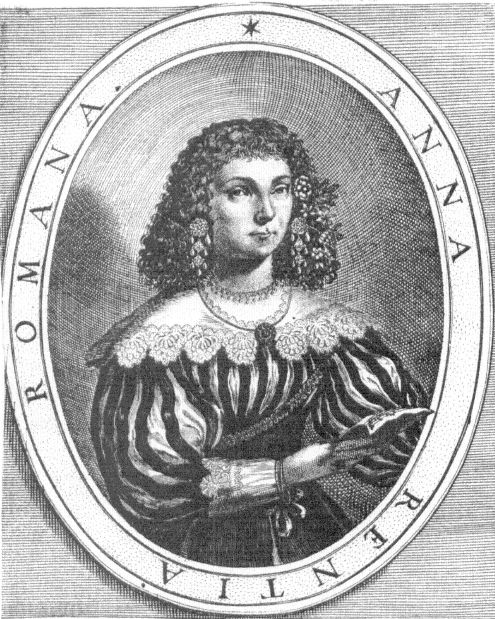
Anna Renzi who sang Ottavia in the premiere of L'incoronazione di Poppea

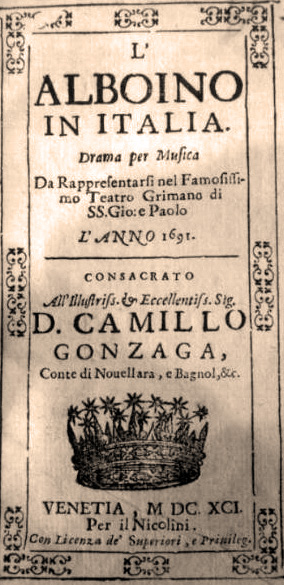
Libretto for L' Alboino in Italia which premiered at the Teatro Santi Giovanni e Paolo in 1691

The librettist of La delia, Giulio Strozzi, became primarily based at the nearby Teatro Novissimo but returned to SS. Giovanni e Paolo for the 1642–1643 season, bringing with him the singers Barbara Strozzi and Anna Renzi (who sang Ottavia in the premiere of L'incoronazione di Poppea) and the pioneering set designer Giacomo Torelli. According to Rosand, it may have been at Santi Giovanni e Paolo that Torelli developed his machinery for changing several sets simultaneously.

In 1654 the theatre was remodelled specifically as an opera house by the architect Carlo Fontana in one of his earliest commissions, and became the first fully developed horseshoe-shaped opera house in Italy, a design which remained essentially unchanged for over two centuries. Its magnificent interior could seat about 900 people with five tiers of boxes and additional seating on the U-shaped floor (or platea) in front of the stage. The theatre was described in 1663 by an observer as having:

...marvellous scene changes, majestic and grand appearances [of performers] ... and a magnificent flying machine; you see, as if commonplace, glorious heavens, deities, seas, royal palaces, woods, forests...

Marco Faustini became the theatre's impresario in 1660, and for the next fifteen years the Teatro Santi Giovanni e Paolo and the Teatro di San Salvatore a San Luca (owned by the Vendramin family) were to be the dominant opera houses in Venice, each putting on two new operas every year.

By 1700, the Grimani family had built two more theatres in Venice, the Teatro San Samuele and the Teatro San Giovanni Grisostomo. An economic crisis made the Teatro Santi Giovanni e Paolo increasingly difficult to maintain, and it finally closed in 1715.

== Premieres ==
Operas which had their first public performance at the theatre include:

- La Delia by Francesco Manelli (1639)
- Il ritorno d'Ulisse in patria by Monteverdi (1640)
- L'incoronazione di Poppea by Monteverdi (carnival season 1642/43)
- Xerse by Francesco Cavalli (1654)
- Statira principessa di Persia by Francesco Cavalli (1655, possibly 1656)
- Scipione affricano by Cavalli (1664)
- Il Tito by Antonio Cesti (1666)
- Totila by Giovanni Legrenzi (1677)
- La Gerusalemme liberata by Carlo Pallavicino (1687)
- L' Alboino in Italia by Carlo Francesco Pollarolo (1691)
- Zenobia, regina de' Palmireni by Tomaso Albinoni, (carnival season 1694)
- Marsia deluso by Francesco Pollarolo (1713)

== See also ==
- List of theatres and opera houses in Venice
