= Giulio Strozzi =

Italian poet and librettist (1583-1652)

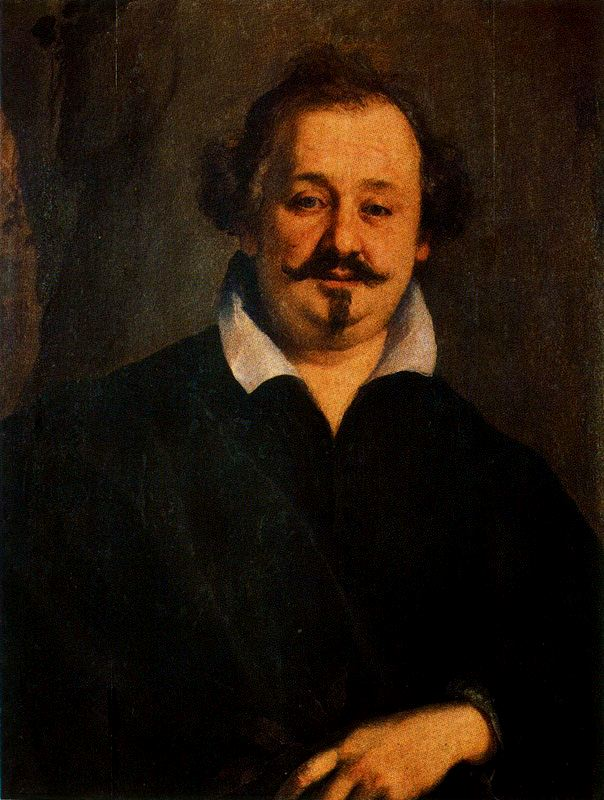
- Portrait painting of the poet Giulio Strozzi, by Tiberio Tinelli, in the Galleria degli Uffizi, Florence
- Born: 1583; Venice
- Died: 31 March 1652; Venice
- Education: University of Pisa
- Occupations: Poet, librettist, playwright
- Notable work: La finta pazza, La finta savia
- Movement: Baroque

Giulio Strozzi (1583 - 31 March 1652) was a Venetian poet and libretto writer. His libretti were put to music by composers like Claudio Monteverdi, Francesco Cavalli, Francesco Manelli, and Francesco Sacrati. He sometimes used the pseudonym Luigi Zorzisto.

== Biography ==
Giulio Strozzi was a bastard, and later legitimized, son of Roberto Strozzi, from the Strozzi family. Born in Venice in 1583, he first studied there before going to the University of Pisa to study law.

He lived and worked in Rome, Padua, and Urbino before returning to Venice in the 1620s. He was the adoptive father of composer Barbara Strozzi (born in 1619 from Isabella Garzoni, a woman servant living in Strozzi's house, and possibly his illegitimate daughter). He remained there until his death on 31 March 1652.

== Work ==
He wrote poetry and plays, but is best remembered as one of the first writers of libretti, the texts used for all kinds of musical plays but most specifically opera.

His earliest known work was in 1609, an oration for the burial of Ferdinando I de' Medici, Grand Duke of Tuscany, for whom he also organized the burial rites. It was the first in a long-term series of efforts to get the patronage of the Medici family during the next decades, including a lengthy dedication of his 1624 reprint of the Venetia edificata to Ferdinando II de' Medici, Grand Duke of Tuscany.

In 1621, he wrote his only epic poem, Venetia edificata. It was expanded and reprinted in 1624. Celebrating the glory of the Republic of Venice, it was at the same time written in support of Galileo Galilei and his controversial scientific theories. He also wrote a translation of the Spanish Lazarillo de Tormes which remained unpublished.

From 1627 on, he mostly dedicated himself to writing opera libretti, and he was probably the most important opera writer in Venice in the 1630s and 1640s. He wrote La finta pazza Licori for Claudio Monteverdi in 1627. The two had first met in 1621. The opera was never performed and it is unknown how much of the music for it had been written before the project was abandoned. Both the music and the libretto are lost.

In the 1630s and 1640s, Strozzi was one of the driving forces behind the successful growth of opera in Venice. He wrote the libretto for the opening of the Teatro Santi Giovanni e Paolo in 1639 (La Delia, music by Francesco Manelli), and for the 1641 opening of the Teatro Novissimo (La finta pazza, music by Francesco Sacrati).

In 1630 Strozzi wrote Proserpina Rapita. His last libretto, Veremonda, l'amazzone di Aragona, was written for Francesco Cavalli in 1652.

He was a member of the Accademia degli Incogniti in Venice. He was the founder of some cultural "academies", gatherings of like-minded intellectuals; these included the Ordinati during his stay in Rome, and the Dubbiosi in Venice. In 1637 he founded the Accademia degli Unisoni, a gathering of musicians where his adopted daughter Barbara sang.

== Bibliography ==
=== Poetry and plays ===
- 1611: Erotilla, a tragedy (reprinted 1616)
- 1621: Il natale di amore, poetry (second impression)
- 1621: La Venetia edificata, a heroic poem in twelve cantos about Venice (expanded to 24 cantos in 1624, reprinted 1626)
- 1625: Il Barbarigo, play (reprinted 1650)
- 1628: I cinque fratelli, poetry, set to music by Claudio Monteverdi

=== Libretti ===
- 1627: La finta pazza Licori, music by Claudio Monteverdi: unfinished and lost
- 1629: Gelosia placata, music by Giovanni Rovetta
- 1630: Proserpina rapita, music by Claudio Monteverdi (reprinted 1644)
- 1639: La Delia, music by Francesco Manelli (reprinted 1644)
- 1641: La finta pazza, music by Francesco Sacrati (reprinted in 1641, 1644 and 1645: reprints with changes and without Strozzis name in 1644 and 1647)
- 1643: La finta savia
- 1645: Il Romolo e'l Remo (last part of a trilogy together with the two finta libretti)
- 1652: Veremonda, l'amazzone di Aragona

=== Other works ===
- 1609: Oration for the burial of Ferdinando I de' Medici, Grand Duke of Tuscany
- 1621: Oration for the burial of Cosimo II de' Medici, Grand Duke of Tuscany
- 1632: Lettere famigliarmente scritta, a collection of letters
- 1644: Le glorie della Signora Anna Renzi romana, a laudatio for the opera singer Anna Renzi who had sung title roles in a few of his works
