= Henri Sauval =

French historian (1623–1676)

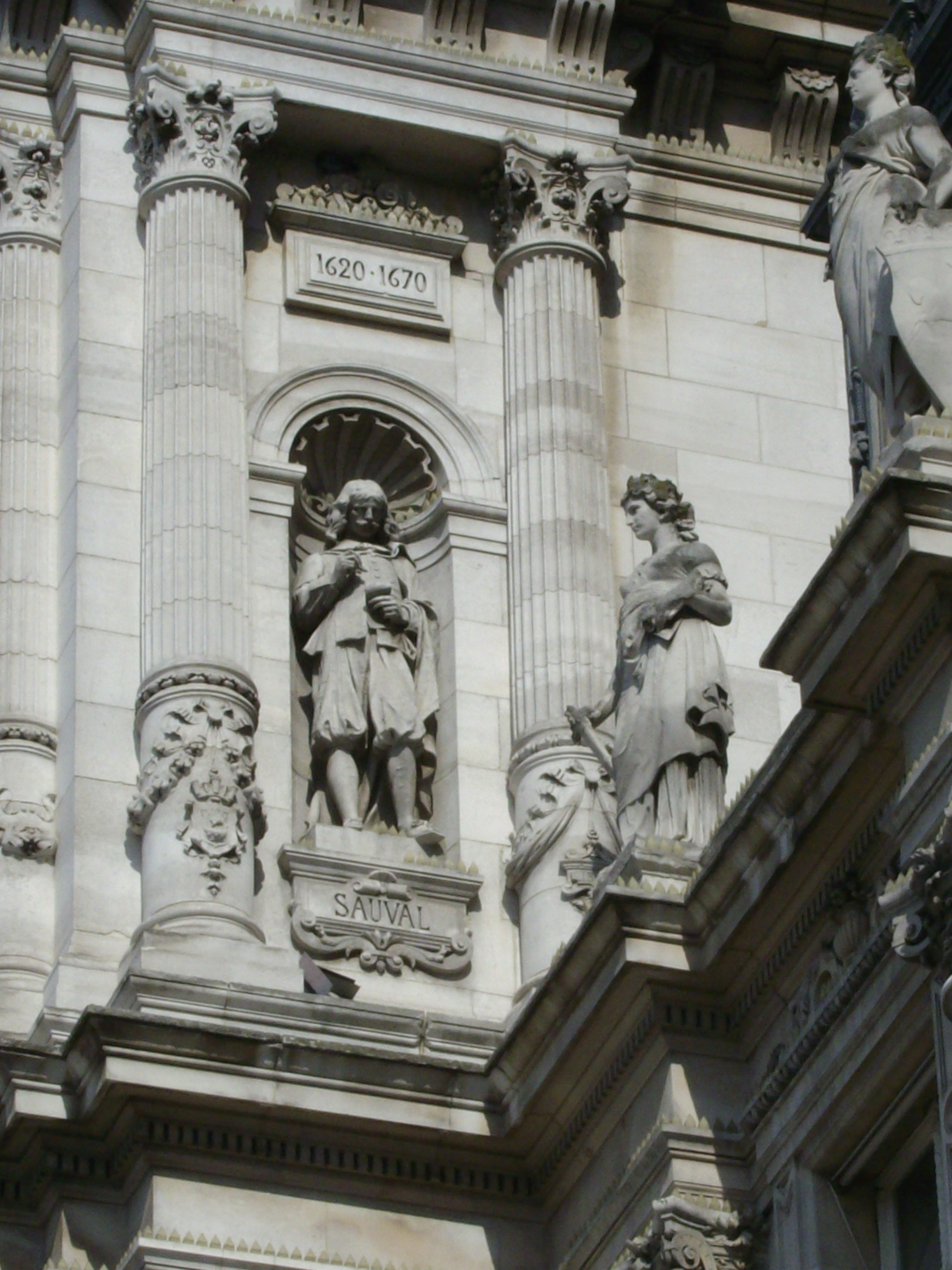
Statue said to depict Sauval, on the Louvre in Paris

Henri Sauval (5 March 1623 (baptised) – 21 March 1676) was a French historian.

== Biography ==
Sauval was the son of an advocate in the Parlement. He was born in Paris, and baptized on 5 March 1623. He spent much of his life to conducting research in the archives of Paris. In 1656, he obtained a licence to publish his work Paris ancien et moderne, but at the time of his death on 21 March 1676, the whole work was still in manuscript form. It was later published in 1724 by Claude Bernard Rousseau, who had worked with Sauval on the book, under the title of Histoire et recherches des antiquites de la ville de Paris. The edition was revised and included additional commentary which was not from Sauval.

The work was re-issued in 1733 and 1750. The original manuscript first belonged to Montmerqué, and then passed into the possession of Le Roux de Lincy, who prepared an annotated edition. Both the manuscript and Lincy's materials were lost in the fires during the Paris Commune in 1871. However, Le Roux de Lincy's research survives in a series of articles on Sauval which appeared in the Bulletin du bibliophile et du bibliothcaire in 1862, 1866 and 1868.

Rue Sauval is a street in Paris' 1st arrondissement.
