= Nicolas Cochin =

French draughtsman and engraver (1610–1686)

Nicolas Cochin (1610–1686), called the Elder, was a French draughtsman and engraver. He was born at Troyes in 1610, the son of a painter named Noel Cochin. About 1635, he went to Paris, where he died in 1686. He often imitated and copied Jacques Callot, but chose for his model Stefano della Bella, some of whose drawings he engraved. Like these two artists he excelled in small figures, which he grouped and delineated with lifelike animation. His specialty was topography, including battles, sieges, and encampments. He engraved several hundred subjects, the most important of which are those he executed for the "Glorieuses Conquêtes de Louis le Grand", called the "Grand Beaulieu", published between 1676 and 1694. The best of these plates may be the "Siege of Arras", engraved on 16 plates by Cochin and Jean Frosne.

Cochin is the best of the engravers whom Troyes has produced. His drawing is firm, and his engraving fine and delicate. His plates are marked with his name in full, or with his initials only, or with a monogram. M. Corrard de Breban has given in his "Graveurs Troyens", 1868, a list of Cochin's works, among which the following are noteworthy:

- The Life of the Virgin; after Albrecht Dürer; 18 plates
- The Marriage in Cana; after Paolo Veronese
- The Miracle of the Loaves; after Devos
- The Parable of the Prodigal Son; after Audran; 4 plates
- Christ bearing the Cross; after Callot
- The Ascension of the Virgin; after the same
- The Passion; 12 plates
- The Conversion of St. Paul
- The Procession of St. Genevieve in 1652; extremely curious
- The Entry of Louis XIV. and his Queen into Paris in 1660; an enormous work composed of several plates.
- The Entry of the Queen of Sweden. 1658.
- The Fair of Guibray; after F. Chauvel. 1658.
- Portrait of Boutmie, the goldsmith; rare and highly esteemed.
- View of Tournay; after Van der Meulen; 2 sheets.
