= Francesco Manelli =

Italian composer

Francesco Manelli (Mannelli) (c. 1595 – 1667) was a Roman Baroque composer, particularly of opera, and a theorbo player. He is most well known for his collaboration with fellow Roman composer Benedetto Ferrari in bringing commercial opera to Venice. The first two works, in 1637 and 1638, to be put on commercially in the Teatro San Cassiano were both by Manelli – his L'Andromeda and La Maga Fulminata.

Francesco Manelli was for many years confused with the Franciscan friar Giovanni Battista Fasolo, because of the resemblances between Manelli's cantata Luciata (published in Musiche varie, op. 4 Venice, 1636), and Fasolo's dialogue Il carro di Madama Lucia (Rome, 1628), and the shared text of the first piece in both collections. In a comparison of the two cantatas Fasolo's version is "languid and melancholy", while Manelli's version is "spirited and biting".

A mid-14th-century Florentine scholar of the same name, also called dei Pontigiano, was a close friend of Giovanni Boccaccio.

== Works ==
Operas, music for all of which is lost.

- L'Andromeda (libretto: Benedetto Ferrari) (1637)
- La maga fulminata (Ferrari) (1638)
- Delia ossia La sera sposa del sole (Giulio Strozzi) (1639)
- Il pastor regio (Ferrari) 1640
- L'Adone (Paolo Vendramin) (1640)
- L'Alcate (Marc' Antonio Tirabosco) (1642)
- Ercole nell'Erimanto (Bernardo Morando) (1651)
- Le vicende del tempo (Morando) (1652)
- Il ratto d'Europa (Paolo Emilio Fantuzzi / Elvezio Sandri) (1653)
- La Filo, overo Giunone repacificata con Ercole (Francesco Berni) (1660)
- La Licasta (Ferrari) (1664)

Cantatas

- Musiche varie Op. 4 (1636)

== Recordings ==
- Duet - Ti lascio empia, inconstante. Musiche varie, Op. 4, Suzie LeBlanc (Soprano), Derek Lee Ragin (Countertenor), Love and Death in Venice, Teatro Lirico, dir. Stephen Stubbs, Virgin Classics, 1996

== See also ==
- Grove Music Online Article, Manelli (Mannelli), Francesco
- The New Grove Dictionary of Opera, Manelli (Mannelli), Francesco (? ‘Il Fasolo’)
