= Francesco Sacrati =

Italian composer

Francesco Sacrati (17 September 1605 in Parma, Italy – 20 May 1650 in Modena, Italy) was an Italian composer of the Baroque era, who played an important role in the early history of opera. He wrote for the Teatro Novissimo in Venice as well as touring his operas throughout Italy. His most famous piece is La finta pazza ("The Feigned Madwoman", 1641), said to be the first opera ever performed in France (in 1645). The manuscript of this work was long thought to be lost, but a touring edition of the manuscript was discovered by musicologist Lorenzo Bianconi in 1984. Some of the music bears striking similarities to the score of Monteverdi's L'incoronazione di Poppea, prompting scholars to speculate that Sacrati had a part in composing the surviving version of that opera. The United States premiere of La finta pazza, and first performance outside Europe, occurred in April 2010 at Yale University.

== Operas ==
- La Delia (1639)
- La finta pazza (1641)
- Bellerofonte (1642)
- Venere gelosa (1643)
- Proserpina Rapita (1644)
- L'Ulisse errante (1644)
- La Semiramide in India (1648)
- L'isola di Alcina (1648)
- Ergasto (1650)
