= Operas performed at the Teatro San Cassiano =

This is the list of operas performed at the Teatro San Cassiano in Venice.

No.	Year	Title	Librettist	Composer	Notes
1	1637	Andromeda	Benedetto Ferrari	Francesco Manelli	
2	1638	La maga fulminata	Benedetto Ferrari	Francesco Manelli	
3	1639	Le nozze di Teti e di Peleo	Orazio Persiani	Francesco Cavalli	
4	1640	Gli amori d'Apollo e di Dafne	Giovanni Francesco Busenello	Francesco Cavalli	
5	1641	La Didone	Giovanni Francesco Busenello	Francesco Cavalli	
6	1642	La virtù de' strali d'Amore	Giovanni Faustini	Francesco Cavalli	
7	1643	L'Egisto	Giovanni Faustini	Francesco Cavalli	
8	1644	L'Ormindo	Giovanni Faustini	Francesco Cavalli	
9	1645	Doriclea	Giovanni Faustini	Francesco Cavalli	
10	1645	Il Titone	Giovanni Faustini	Francesco Cavalli	
11	1649	Giasone	Giacinto Andrea Cicognini	Francesco Cavalli	
12	1650	Orimonte	Nicolò Minato	Francesco Cavalli	
13	1651	L'Armidoro	Bortolo Castoreo	Francesco Cavalli	
14	1658	L'incostanza trionfante overo il Theseo	F. Piccoli	Pietro Andrea Ziani	
15	1658	Antioco	Nicolò Minato	Francesco Cavalli	
16	1659	Elena	Nicolò Minato	Francesco Cavalli	
17	1666	Il Giasone	Giacinto Andrea Cicognini	Francesco Cavalli	
18	1666	La Zenobia	Matteo Noris	Giovanni Antonio Boretti	
19	1679–80	Candaule	Adriano Morselli	Pietro Andrea Ziani	
20	1680	Tomiri	A. Medolago	A. Vitali	
21	1683	Temistocle in bando	Adriano Morselli	Antonio Gianettini	
22	1683	L'innocenza risorta overo Etio	Adriano Morselli	Pietro Andrea Ziani	
23	1690	Il gran macedone	Giulio Pancieri	Giuseppe Boniventi	
24	1691	L'Almerinda	Giulio Pancieri	Giuseppe Boniventi	
25	1696	Basilio re d'Oriente	G. B. Neri	F. Navarra	
26	1696	La Clotilde	G. B. Neri	G. M. Ruggieri	
27	1696	Zenone imperator d'Oriente	A. Marchi	Tomaso Albinoni	
28	1697	Il Tigrane re d'Armenia	Giulio Cesare Corradi	Tomaso Albinoni	
29	1697 (–98?)	Primislao primo re di Boemia	Giulio Cesare Corradi	Tomaso Albinoni	
30	1698	L'ingratitudine castigata	Francesco Silvani	Tomaso Albinoni	
31	1698	L'Egisto re di Cipro	Giulio Cesare Corradi	Marc'Antonio Ziani	
32	1699	Gl'amori fra gl'odii o sia il Ramiro in Norvegia	M. A. Remena	Marc'Antonio Ziani	
33	1699	Il Teodosio	Vincenzo Grimani	Marc'Antonio Ziani	
34	1700	L'Aristeo	Giulio Cesare Corradi	Antonio Pollarolo	
35	1701	Griselda	Apostolo Zeno	Antonio Pollarolo	
36	1702	L'ingratitudine castigata	Francesco Silvani	Tomaso Albinoni	
37	1702	L'arte in gara con l'arte	Francesco Silvani	Tomaso Albinoni	
38	1702	La pastorella al soglio	Giulio Cesare Corradi	Various	
39	1702–03	Gli imenei stabiliti dal caso	Francesco Silvani	Francesco Gasparini	
40	1703	Il miglior d'ogni amore per il peggiore d'ogni odio	Francesco Silvani	Francesco Gasparini	
41	1703	Il più fedele fra i vassalli	Francesco Silvani	Francesco Gasparini	
42	1704	La fede tradita e vendicata	Francesco Silvani	Francesco Gasparini	
43	1704	La maschera levata al vitio	Francesco Silvani	Francesco Gasparini	
44	1705	La Fredegonda	Francesco Silvani	Francesco Gasparini	
45	1705	Il principato custodito dalla frode	Francesco Silvani	Francesco Gasparini	
46	1705	Antioco	Apostolo Zeno; Pietro Pariati	Francesco Gasparini	
47	1705	Ambleto	Apostolo Zeno; Pietro Pariati	Francesco Gasparini	
48	1706	Statira	Apostolo Zeno; Pietro Pariati	Francesco Gasparini	
49	1706	Sidonio	Pietro Pariati	Antonio Lotti	
50	1707	Taican re della Cina	U. Rizzi	Francesco Gasparini	
51	1707	L'amor generoso	Apostolo Zeno	Francesco Gasparini	
52	1707	Achille placato	U. Rizzi	Antonio Lotti	
53	1707	Anfitrione	Pietro Pariati	Francesco Gasparini	
54	1707–08	Teuzzone	Apostolo Zeno	Antonio Lotti	
55	1708	Flavio Anicio Olibrio	Apostolo Zeno; Pietro Pariati	Francesco Gasparini	
56	1708	Astarto	Apostolo Zeno; Pietro Pariati	Tomaso Albinoni	
57	1709	Il falso Tiberino	Apostolo Zeno; Pietro Pariati	Carlo Francesco Pollarolo	
58	1709	Engelberta	Apostolo Zeno; Pietro Pariati	Francesco Gasparini; Tomaso Albinoni	
59	1709	La principessa fedele	A. Piovene	Francesco Gasparini	
60	1709–10	Ciro	Pietro Pariati	Tomaso Albinoni	
61	1710	Sesostri re d'Egitto	Apostolo Zeno; Pietro Pariati	Francesco Gasparini	
62	1710	La ninfa Apollo	Francesco de Lemene	Francesco Gasparini; Antonio Lotti	"scherzo scenico pastorale per musica"
63	1710	L'amor tirannico	Domenico Lalli	Francesco Gasparini	
64	1710	Il tiranno eroe	V. Cassani	Tomaso Albinoni	
65	1711	Tamerlano	A. Piovene	Francesco Gasparini	
66	1711	Costantino	Apostolo Zeno; Pietro Pariati	Francesco Gasparini	
67	1712	Merope	Apostolo Zeno	Francesco Gasparini	
68	1712	Le gare generose	A. Zaniboni	Tomaso Albinoni	
69	1712–13	I veri amici	Francesco Silvani; Domenico Lalli	A. Paulati	
70	1713	La verità nell'inganno	Francesco Silvani	Francesco Gasparini	
71	1717	L'Argippo	Domenico Lalli	Giovanni Porta	
72	1718	Farnace	Domenico Lalli	Carlo Francesco Pollarolo	
73	1718	Antigona	B. Pasqualigo	Giuseppe Maria Orlandini	
74	1724	Antigona	B. Pasqualigo	Giuseppe Maria Orlandini	
75	1724	Despina e Niso	G. Papis (?)	Alessandro Scarlatti	"intermezzo in musica"
76	1724–25	Didone abbandonata	Pietro Metastasio	Tomaso Albinoni	
77	1725	Alcina delusa da Ruggero	A. Marchi	Tomaso Albinoni	
78	1725	L'impresario delle Canarie	Pietro Metastasio	Tomaso Albinoni	"intermezzo in musica"
79	1725–26	L'inganno innocente	Francesco Silvani	Tomaso Albinoni	
80	1726	Amor e sdegno	M. Boccardi	L. Tavelli	
81	1727	Il Bertarido re de' Longobardi	Antonio Salvi	Giuseppe Boniventi	
82	1728	Griselda	Apostolo Zeno	Tomaso Albinoni	
83	1728	Ormisda	Apostolo Zeno	Bartolomeo Cordans	
84	1728–29	Gianguir	Apostolo Zeno	Geminiano Giacomelli	
85	1729	La generosità di Tiberio	Nicolò Minato	S. Lapis; Bartolomeo Cordans	
86	1729	Adelaide	Antonio Salvi	Giuseppe Maria Orlandini	
87	1730	La fede in cimento	Apostolo Zeno	Francesco Gasparini; S. Lapis	
88	1730	La donna nobile	Unknown	Giuseppe Maria Orlandini	"intermezzo in musica"
89	1735	L'Anagilda	A. Zaniboni	Antonio Gaetano Pampani	
90	1736	La Zoe	Francesco Silvani	Luca Antonio Predieri	
91	1736–37	L'Arsace	Antonio Salvi	Geminiano Giacomelli	
92	1737	Demetrio	Pietro Metastasio	Johann Adolph Hasse	revival
93	1737	Lucio Papirio	Antonio Salvi	Nicola Porpora	
94	1742	Barsina	Francesco Silvani	G. A. Paganelli	
95	1742	Atalo	Francesco Silvani	G. Chinzer	
96	1743	Engelberta	Apostolo Zeno	G. Paganelli	
97	1743	Ambleto	Apostolo Zeno; Pietro Pariati	G. Carcani	
98	1743	La forza del sangue	B. Vitturi	G. A. Paganelli	
99	1744	La libertà nociva	G. Barlocci	R. di Capua	
100	1744	Madama Ciana	G. Barlocci	G. Latilla	
101	1744–45	L'ambizione delusa	F. Vanneschi	R. di Capua	
102	1744–45	La finta cameriera	G. Barlocci	G. Latilla	
103	1745	La forza d'amore	P. Panicelli	Baldassare Galuppi	
104	1745	Lo scialacquatore alla fiera	A. Borghesi	G. Orlandini; various	
105	1745	I rigiri delle cantarine	B. Vitturi	F. Maggiore	
106	1746	La vedova accorta	A. Borghesi (?)	F. Bertoni	
107	1746	La fata meravigliosa	Unknown	G. Scolari	
108	1746	Alcibiade	G. Roccaforte	G. Carcani	
109	1746–47	Il Catone in Utica	Pietro Metastasio	L. Vinci; (N. Jommelli)	
110	1747	Caio Marzio Coriolano	Z. Seriman	P. Pulli	
111	1747	Arminio	Antonio Salvi	B. Galuppi	
112	1748	L'Adriano	Pietro Metastasio	V. Ciampi	
113	1748	La clemenza di Tito	Pietro Metastasio	G. Pampani	
114	1748	Clotilde	F. Passarini	B. Galuppi	
115	1748	Il conte immaginario	Unknown	P. Auletta	"intermezzo in musica" for Clotilde
116	1748–49	Camilla regina de' Volsci	S. Stampiglia	Various	
117	1749	Il vello d'oro	G. Palazzi; M. Zanetti (?)	G. Scolari	
118	1749	La commedia in commedia	G. G. Barlocci; F. Vanneschi (?)	R. di Capua	
119	1749	Tra due litiganti il terzo gode	G. B. Lorenzi	G. B. Pescetti	
120	1749	Il finto principe	C. Goldoni	Various	
121	1749	Il protettore alla moda	G. M. Buini	G. M. Buini; B. Galuppi	
122	1750	Alcimena principessa dell'isole fortunate ossia l'amore fortunato ne' suoi disprezzi	P. Chiari	B. Galuppi	
123	1750	Il ciarlatano fortunato nelle sue imposture	Unknown	Unknown	"farsa per musica" – intermezzo for Alcimena
124	1750	Ernelinda	Francesco Silvani	Francesco Gasparini; A. Vivaldi; B. Galuppi	
125	1750	La preziosa ridicola	M. Trotti	Giuseppe Maria Orlandini	"intermezzo in musica" for Ernelinda
126	1750	Il mondo alla roversa, ossia le donne che comandano	C. Goldoni	B. Galuppi	
127	1750–51	La mascherata	C. Goldoni	G. Cocchi (?); B. Galuppi (?)	
128	1751	Le donne vendicate	C. Goldoni	G. Cocchi	
129	1751	Griselda	Apostolo Zeno	G. Latilla	
130	1752	Venceslao	Apostolo Zeno	Antonio Gaetano Pampani	
131	1752	L'Adriano in Siria	Pietro Metastasio	G. Scarlatti	
132	1752	L'olimpiade	Pietro Metastasio	G. Latilla	
133	1753	Alessandro nell'Indie	Pietro Metastasio	G. Latilla	
134	1753	Semiramide riconosciuta	Pietro Metastasio	G. Cocchi	
135	1753	Il pazzo glorioso	C. Goldoni (after A. Villani)	G. Cocchi	
136	1753–54	De gustibus non est disputandum	C. Goldoni	G. Scarlatti	
137	1754	La maestra	A. Palomba	G. Cocchi	
138	1763	La morte di Dimone o sia l'innocenza vendicata	J. J. F. von Kurz; G. Bertati	A. Tozzi	
139	1764	Li creduti spiriti	J. J. F. von Kurz; G. Bertati	J. G. Naumann; various	
140	1764	Achille in Sciro	Pietro Metastasio	F. Bertoni	
141	1764	L'ingannatore ingannato	P. Chiari	F. Bertoni	
142	1765	L'olimpiade	Pietro Metastasio	F. Bertoni	
143	1765	Semiramide	Pietro Metastasio	T. Traetta	
144	1765	L'amore industrioso	F. Casorri	G. M. Rutini	
145	1765	Le villeggiatrici ridicole	A. Bianchi	A. Boroni	
146	1765	I matrimoni in maschera	F. Casorri	G. M. Rutini	
147	1765	Gli amori di Zeffiro	–	Unknown	"ballo" by G. Fabiani (choreographer)
148	1765	La ghirlanda incantata	–	Unknown	"ballo" by G. Fabiani (choreographer)
149	1766	La buona figliuola supposta vedova	A. Bianchi	G. Latilla	
150	1766	La notte critica	C. Goldoni	A. Boroni	
151	1766	Solimano	G. Migliavacca	G. Sciroli	
152	1769	Il contratto malizioso o sia sior Bastian Marzer	P. Candoni	Unknown	"farsa" in "lingua veneziana"
153	1770	La villeggiatura di Mestre	G. Dolfin	S. Perillo	"farsa per musica"
154	1770	La marenda alla Zuecca	G. Dolfin	Unknown	"farsa per musica"
155	1771	La serenata in tartana	G. Dolfin	Unknown	"farsa per musica"
156	1771	La ritornata dalla villeggiatura di Mestre	G. Dolfin	S. Perillo (?)	"farsa per musica"
157	1772	La fiera	G. Dolfin	Unknown	"farsa per musica"
158	1772	Le putte della Zuecca	Unknown	Unknown	"farsa per musica"
159	1773	La serva astuta	Unknown	Unknown	"farsa per musica"
160	1773	Le finezze d'amore o sia la farsa non si fa ma si prova	G. Bertati (?)	G. Astarita	"farsa per musica"
161	1773	Amore in puntiglio	Unknown	J. M. Pfeiffer	"farsa per musica"
162	1773	La costanza d'amore o sia l'inganno per necessità	Unknown	Unknown	"farsa per musica"
163	1774	Li cavalieri lunatici	Unknown	G. Rust	"farsa per musica"
164	1774	Le nozze concluse alla Zueccha	Unknown	Unknown	"farsa per musica"
165	1775	La critica teatrale	R. Calzabigi	G. Astarita	
166	1775	Li due amanti in inganno	Unknown	G. Rust; M. Rauzzini	
167	1776	Il baron di Lago Nero	Unknown	M. Mortellari	
168	1776	Il Giove di Creta	P. Pisoni	G. Rust	
169	1776	Li tre vagabondi	Unknown	S. Perillo	
170	1777	Il convitato di pietra	Pietro Pariati (?)	G. Callegari	
171	1777	L'idolo cinese	Unknown	G. Rust	
172	1779	L'isola d'amor	Unknown	A. Sacchini	
173	1780	Le nozze alla Mira	Unknown	A. Gagni	"farsa per musica"
174	1780	Le donne rivali	Unknown	D. Cimarosa	"intermezzo in musica"
175	1781	L'amor per rigiro	N. Tassi	A. Gagni	"intermezzo in musica" for five voices
176	1781	Il matrimonio per inganno	G. Bertati (?)	P. Anfossi	"intermezzo in musica"
177	1781	Rosina consolata o sia l'innocenza protetta	P. A. Bagliacca	G. Valentini	"intermezzo in musica" for four voices
178	1782	Li tre difettosi rivali in amore	G. Prettini	Unknown	"intermezzo in musica"
179	1783	Le due finte gemelle	G. Petrosellini	N. Piccinni	"intermezzo in musica" for four voices
180	1783	I matti gloriosi	Unknown	A. Gagni	"intermezzo in musica"
181	1784	Il parigino in Italia	Unknown	L. Baini	"intermezzo in musica"
182	1784	Il finto parigino	Unknown	L. Baini	"intermezzo in musica"
183	1784	Il matrimonio inaspettato	Unknown	G. Paisiello	"intermezzo in musica"
184	1787	Le stravaganze in campagna	Unknown	A. Brunetti	
185	1787	Li tre Orfei	Unknown	M. Bernardini	
186	1788	L'impostor punito	G. Neri	P. Guglielmi	
187	1791	I capricci in amore	Unknown	G. Astarita	
188	1791	Don Mirtillo contrastato	Unknown	G. Giordani	
189	1792	Il medico parigino o sia l'ammalato per amore	G. Palomba	G. Astarita	
190	1792	L'ultima che si perde è la speranza	F. S. Zini (?)	M. Bernardini (?)	"farsa per musica"
191	1793	Attila	–	V. Trento	"ballo" by D. Ballon (choreographer)
192	1793	La cifra	L. Da Ponte	Antonio Salieri	
193	1793	Le trame amorose	A. Valli	F. Paër (o G. Paisiello?)	
194	1794	Il mercato di Monfregoso	C. Goldoni	N. A. Zingarelli	
195	1794	L'amante statua	A. Valli	L. Piccinni	"farsa per musica"
196	1794	I veneziani a Costantinopoli	–	V. Trento	"ballo" by D. Ballon (choreographer)
197	1794	La finta ammalata	G. Squilloni	V. Trento	
198	1798	La sposa di stravagante temperamento	Unknown	P. Guglielmi	
199	1798	Gli umori contrari	G. Bertati	S. Nasolini	

== Bibliography ==
- Alm, Irene (1993). Catalog of Venetian Librettos at the University of California. Los Angeles, Berkeley, Oxford: University of California Press. ISBN 9780520097629.
- Bonlini, Giovanni Carlo (1730). Le glorie della poesia e della musica [...]. Venice: C. Buonarrigo. Copy at Google Books.
- Groppo, Antonio (1745). Catalogo di tutti i drammi per musica recitati ne’ teatri di Venezia [...]. Venice: A. Groppo. OCLC 11395876.
- Loewenberg, Alfred (1978). Annals of Opera 1597–1940 (third edition, revised). Totowa, New Jersey: Rowman and Littlefield. ISBN 978-0-87471-851-5.
- Sartori, Claudio (1990–1994). I libretti italiani a stampa dalle origini al 1800. Catalogo analitico con 16 indici, 7 vols. Cuneo: Bertola & Locatelli. OCLC 21782984.
- Selfridge-Field, Eleanor (2007). A New Chronology of Venetian Opera and Related Genres, 1660–1760. Stanford: Stanford University Press. ISBN 978-0-8047-4437-9.
- Sonneck, Oscar George Theodore (1914). Catalogue of Opera Librettos Printed Before 1800, 2 vols. Washington: Government Printing Office. Vol. 1 and 2 at Internet Archive.
- Whenham, John (2004). "Perspectives on the Chronology of the First Decade of Public Opera at Venice", “Il Saggiatore musicale”, vol. 11 no.2, (2004), pp. 253–302. JSTOR 43029778.
- Wiel, Taddeo (1897). I teatri musicali veneziani del Settecento. Venice: Visentini.
