= Marco Faustini =

Venetian impresario (1606–1676)

Marco Faustini (17 May 1606 – 7 January 1676) was an Italian theatrical impresario and brother of the impresario and librettist Giovanni Faustini.

== Biography ==
Marco Faustini was born in Venice. He began his career as an entrepreneur in the summer of 1651, working at the Teatro Sant'Apollinare in Venice. After his brother's death on 19 December 1651, Faustini took over management of the theater until 1657. He went on to manage other theaters including the Teatro San Cassiano from 1657 to 1660, and the Teatro Santi Giovanni e Paolo from 1660 to 1668 (probably with a break from 1663 to 1665).

Marco Faustini, like his brother, collaborated with leading composers of his time including Francesco Cavalli, Pietro Andrea Ziani and Antonio Cesti, and hired famous singers such as Anna Renzi, Antonia Coresi and Vincenza Giulia Masotti. During his years as an impresario, he staged numerous plays of famous librettists of the time including Aurelio Aureli, Francis Small, Nicolò Minato, Nicolò Beregan, Pietro Angelo Zaguri and Cristoforo Ivanovich. Faustini's brother's last works remained unfinished, which he completed.

Faustini's papers are stored at the Scuola Grande di San Marco, which represent a major source of information on the theatre work of the Venetian era.

== Sources ==
- L. Bianconi and T. Walker: Production, Consumption and Political Function of Seventeenth-Century Opera, pp. 209–296 (1984)
- E. Rosand: Opera in Seventeenth-Century Venice: the Creation of a Genre (Berkeley, 1991)
- BL and JE Glixon: Marco Faustini and Venetian Opera Production in the 1650s: Recent Archival Discoveries, pp. 48–73 (1992)
