= Il Pompeo =

Opera by Alessandro Scarlatti

- Opera by Alessandro Scarlatti
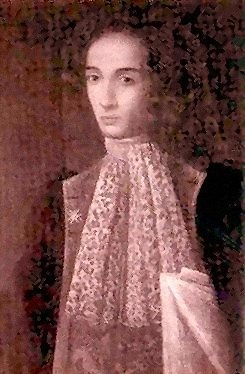
- The composer as a young man
- Librettist: Nicolò Minato
- Language: Italian
- Premiere: 25 January 1683; Teatro di Palazzo Colonna, Rome

Il Pompeo is a dramma per musica in three acts by composer Alessandro Scarlatti. Written in 1682 when Scarlatti was 22 years old, it was his fourth opera and first dramatic work on a serious and grand subject. The opera uses an Italian language libretto by Nicolò Minato which had previously been used by Francesco Cavalli for his 1666 opera Pompeo Magno. The work premiered at the Teatro di Palazzo Colonna in Rome on 25 January 1683.

== Roles ==
Role	Voice type	Premiere cast 25 January 1683
Pompeo	tenor	
Giulio Cesare	bass	
Giulia, daughter of Giulio Cesare	contralto castrato travesti	
Scipione Servilio, loved by Giulia	soprano castrato	
Mitridate	tenor	
Issicratea, Mitridate's wife	soprano castrato travesti	
Sesto, son of Pompeo	alto castrato	
Claudio, son of Giulio Cesare	soprano castrato	
Harpalia, Issicratea's slave	tenor travesti	
Farnace, son of Mitridate	soprano castrato	
