= Rosinda =

Opera by Francesco Cavalli

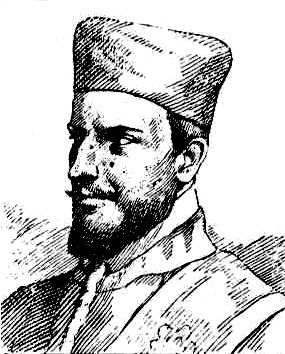
Francesco Cavalli

Rosinda, also known as La Rosinda, is an opera in three acts and a prologue by the Italian composer Francesco Cavalli with a libretto by Giovanni Faustini. It was first performed at the Teatro Sant'Apollinare, Venice in 1651-52 during Carnival. It appears to have been better received than La Calisto, which was also premiered that year, and was revived in Naples and/or Florence in 1653 under the title Le magie amorose.

Its first revival in modern times was in a performing version by Jane Glover for the Oxford University Opera Club with the libretto translated into English by Anne Ridler. Glover conducted the production at the Oxford Playhouse in 1973. The opera was performed in 2008 in Germany (Potsdam and Bayreuth) with Francesca Lombardi Mazzulli in the title role.

== Roles ==
Role	Voice type	Premiere Cast, 1651-02 (Conductor: – )
Aurilla	soprano	
Cillena	soprano	
Clitofonte	tenor	
Meandro	bass	
Nerea	soprano	
Plutone	bass	
Proserpina	soprano	
Rosinda	soprano	
Rudione	bass	
Thisandro	bass	
Vafrillo	soprano	

== Score ==
Cavalli's autograph score is preserved in the Biblioteca Marciana.

== Recordings ==
- complete recording : Emanuela Galli (Nerea), Francesca Lombardi Mazzulli (Rosinda), Makoto Sakurada (Clitofonte), Nicola Ebau (Thisandro / Pluto / Meandro), Fulvio Bettini (Rudione), Silvia Vajente (Proserpina / Aurilla), Milena Storti (Cilena) & Roberto Romagnino (Vafrillo) Ensemble La Sfera Armoniosa, directed by Mike Fentross related to the 2008 touring production. It was released on Ludi Musici.
- aria "Vieni, vieni in questo seno" in L'Arpeggiata's Cavalli compilation L'Amore Innamorato (Erato, 2015).
- aria, Atto I Scena 7: Non col ramo di Cuma Cappella Mediterranea, Leonardo García Alarcón, Clematis, Mariana Flores 2014
