= Music of the Baroque, Chicago =

Chorus and orchestra in Chicago

- Chorus and orchestra
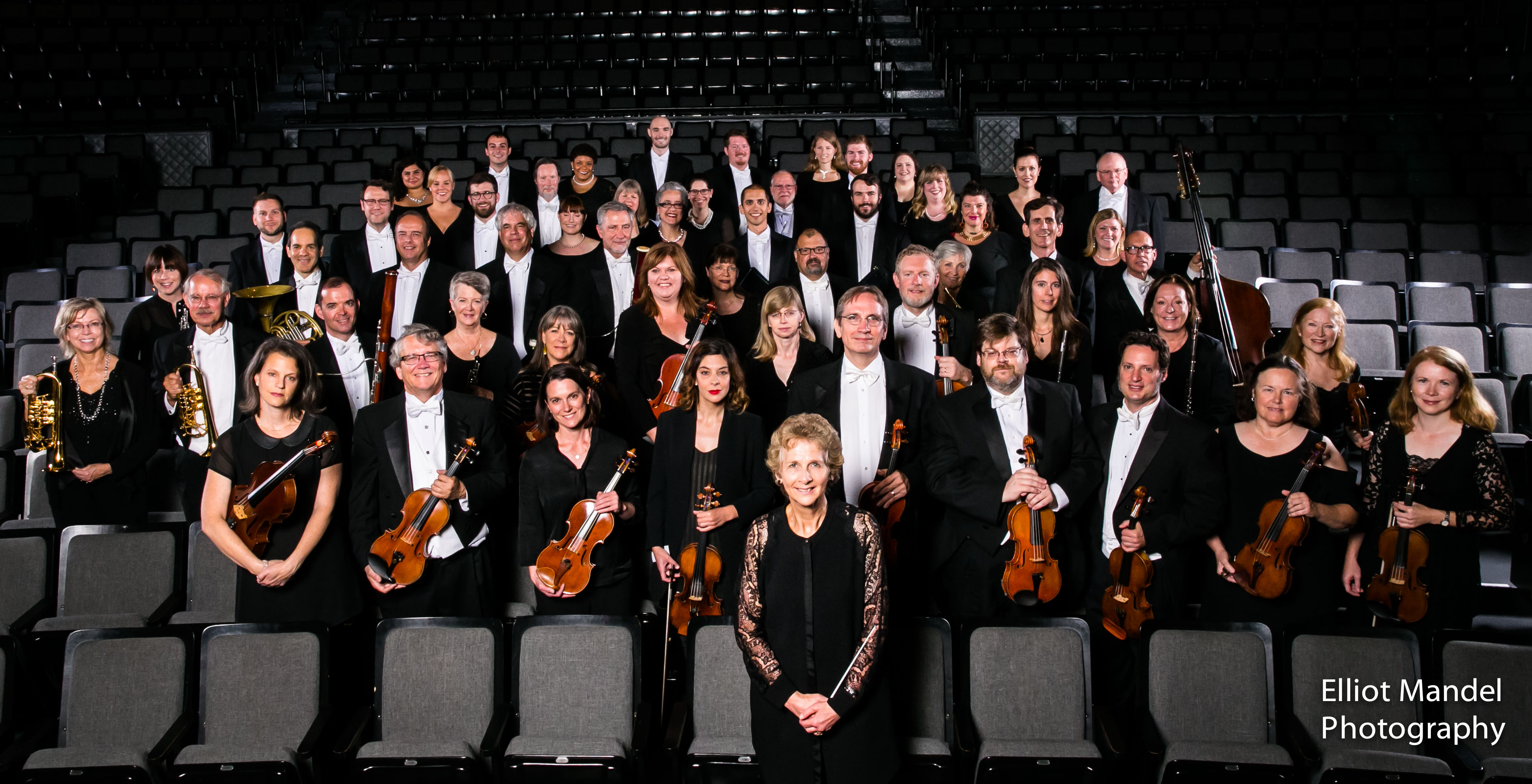
- The Music of the Baroque Chorus and Orchestra with Jane Glover
- Founded: 1971
- Location: Chicago, Illinois, U.S.
- Website: Official website

Music of the Baroque is an American professional chorus and orchestra based in Chicago, Illinois.

Most members of the orchestra also perform with other groups, including the Chicago Symphony Orchestra and Lyric Opera of Chicago. Chorus members have active operatic, teaching, and recital careers and several perform regularly as soloists with Music of the Baroque.

== History 1971–2001: The Wikman years ==
The ensemble was founded by Thomas Wikman (1942–2023) in 1971. At the time, Wikman was a voice teacher and choirmaster at The Church of St. Paul and the Redeemer in the Hyde Park neighborhood of Chicago. Using church choir members as his base, Wikman had begun organizing Sunday afternoon a cappella concerts. As these concerts became more and more popular, Wikman expanded his troupe of vocalists by bartering voice lessons in exchange for singer participation in his concerts. Wikman sought to locate, train, and feature the best singers in the Chicago area, an endeavor he continued to pursue his entire Music of the Baroque career. He strove for “the highest standards of authentic bel canto singing.” Several of his voice studio protégés and Music of the Baroque soloists went on to make their debuts with the Metropolitan Opera, Chicago's Lyric Opera, and the San Francisco Opera as well as the major European Houses including La Scala, Bayreuth, Vienna, and Berlin. These singers included Richard Versalle, Isola Jones, Judith Nelson, Linda Mabbs, Karen Brunssen, William Wahman, and Barbara Pearson.

Music of the Baroque was organized in 1971 when the first instrumentalists were hired, and rehearsals for a Bach cantata concert began. The first concert was in early 1972. Wikman's primary focus continued to be on the vocal, choral, and liturgical aspects of the music; he recruited long-term Music of the Baroque Concertmaster, Elliott Golub, and Principal 2nd violin Everett Zlatoff-Mirsky to help him manage the orchestra. When Co-Principal trumpets Barbara Butler and Charles Geyer were initially hired in 1975, they began to manage the brass ensemble for Wikman. Emulating European ensembles, Wikman eschewed concert halls in favor of Chicago-area churches selected for their beauty and acoustics. Wikman's idea was to distinguish his musical group from other major musical institutions in Chicago such as the symphony and lyric opera through a focus on a different repertoire, different acoustics, and different concert experiences. In addition, musicians were not employees of the group, but instead were freelance artists, many of whom earned a good portion of their income from commercial jingles. This gave Music of the Baroque a greater degree of flexibility than the larger arts organizations in town so the group could pursue quality musicianship as well as continuity of personnel. In 1975 Lucille Ollendorff was elected president of the board of Music of the Baroque, and the group became incorporated as a nonprofit organization; three years later she became general manager of the group, a salaried position initially funded by The Chicago Community Trust. Under Ollendorff's financial management and Wikman's artistic leadership, the 70-member group developed a national reputation as a premier exponent of Baroque music performance according to The Wall Street Journal in December 1984.

Beginning in the early 1980s, Wikman developed a brass and choral concert experience based on his knowledge of historical performances in Renaissance Italian cathedrals such as St Mark's Basilica in Venice. Wikman reproduced the Venetian polychoral style in Chicago-area churches which involved spatially separated vocal and brass choirs in alternation. The format of this concert was immensely popular and became a Christmas tradition in the Chicago area.

By 1985 Music of the Baroque was the largest fully professional music organization devoted solely to the performance of 16th-, 17th-, and 18th-century choral and instrumental music. The group performed in four locations around the Chicago area including Hyde Park, River Forest, Evanston, and Lincoln Park. The group also performed at the Ravinia Festival and at the White House. In 1985, a chamber/cantata series was added to the main subscription series.

After the death of Lucille Ollendorff in 1988, Kathleen Butera was named president and executive director. The Music of the Baroque operating budget grew from $700,000 in 1984 to $1.25 million in 1990. The organization had more than 3,000 subscribers for the 27 concerts it presented in 1990.

During this time, Music of the Baroque presented a score of pieces that were new to the Chicago area. Often creating his own performance editions, Wikman produced the Chicago premiers of such works as Vespers of The Blessed Virgin (the so-called 1610 Vespers) by Claudio Monteverdi, The Day of Judgement by Georg Philipp Telemann, King Arthur by Henry Purcell, and the oratorios Saul, Deborah, Athalia, and Theodora by George F. Handel. Wikman also presented the world premiere of Idomeneo by Wolfgang Amadeus Mozart using the Neue Mozart Ausgabe edition. In December 1987, Wikman led Music of the Baroque in its New York debut, where he presented a sold-out performance of Johann Sebastian Bach’s Christmas Oratorio.

For three years, beginning in October 1986, Music of the Baroque performances were syndicated by WFMT, Chicago's fine arts radio station, in an annual thirteen-week series. Each week a two-hour broadcast featuring Music of the Baroque performances and hosted by WFMT producer Kerry Frumkin could be heard by radio listeners almost anywhere in the world through WFMT's Fine Arts Network. This Network included most public radio stations in the United States and many radio stations around the world, including those syndicated by the British Broadcasting Corporation, the Canadian Broadcasting Corporation, the European Broadcasting Union, China, and Russia. A total of 39 two-hour programs featuring Music of the Baroque concerts with commentary by Thomas Wikman were included in these three syndicated series. Several other performances of Music of the Baroque were broadcast by WFMT individually in addition to the three syndicated series. In a 1989 WFMT survey of radio station managers, the Music of the Baroque radio series received the highest scores of any other WFMT program; syndicated programs were rated based on overall merit, musical quality, technical quality, production values, program host, and audience appeal.

In 1993 Wikman began performances of five Baroque-era Italian operas.

- 1993 – L’Orfeo (Orpheus) by Claudio Monteverdi,
- 1995 – L'incoronazione di Poppea (The Coronation of Poppaea) by Claudio Monteverdi,
- 1996 – Il ritorno d’Ulisse in patria (The Return of Ulysses to his Homeland) by Claudio Monteverdi,
- 1997 – La Calisto by Francesco Cavalli, and
- 1998 – Orontea by Antonio Cesti.

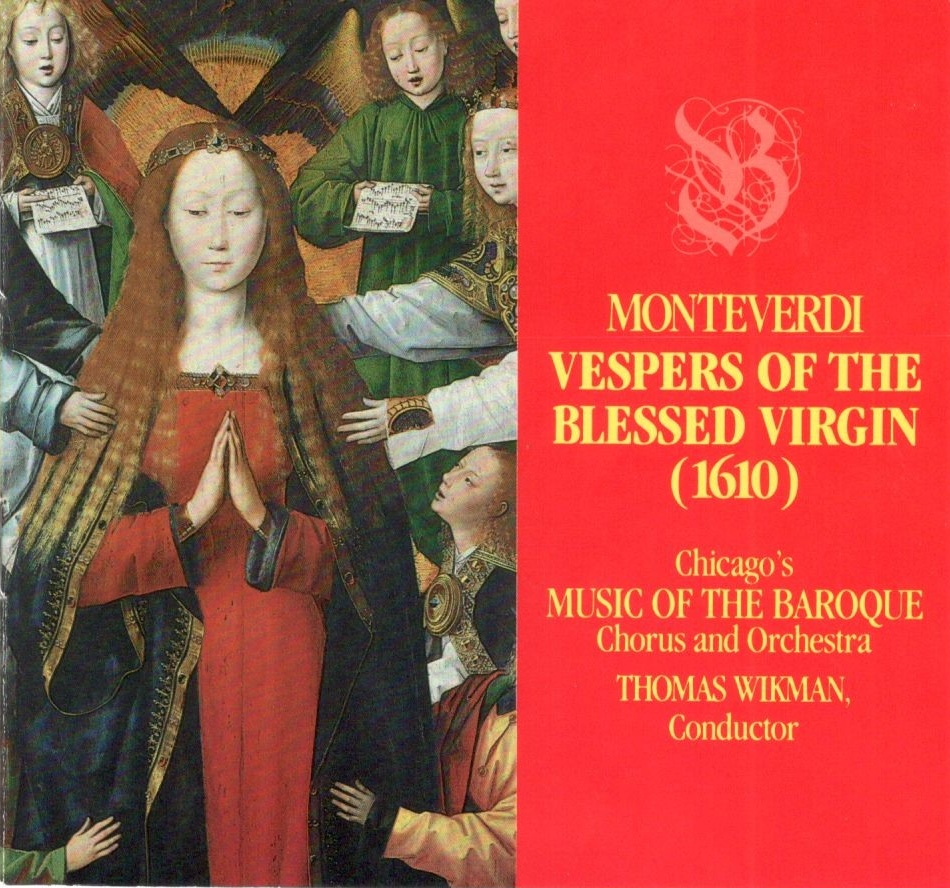

During Wikman's tenure as music director, Music of the Baroque produced seven commercial recordings on its own label. Only two used live performance recordings of concerts; the remaining five were produced using audiotapes made during recording sessions in Chicago area churches. The recordings were sold using both CD and vinyl record formats. Many Music of the Baroque performances led by Wikman and broadcast by WFMT are contained in The Richard and Judith Mintel Archive of Recordings. This Archive is housed at the Library of Congress Packard Campus for Audio-Visual Conservation in Culpeper, Virginia; the recordings will be preserved for posterity. Another copy of the entire Mintel Archive is located at the Northwestern University Music Library in Evanston, Illinois. Wikman's performances of Handel oratorios, the Bach Passions, Italian Baroque operas, liturgical music, and Mozart and Haydn's symphonies are included in the Mintel Archive.

In May 2002, Wikman was awarded a Doctor of Fine Arts Degree (Honoris Causa) from the University of Illinois at Chicago for “making an incomparable contribution to the musical life of Chicago.” This honorary degree award was bestowed primarily for Wikman's work with Music of the Baroque.

== History 2001–present ==
Conductor Jane Glover was named music director in September 2002. Nicholas Kraemer is the ensemble's principal guest conductor. William Jon Gray was named chorus director in 2010. Declan McGovern has been the organization's executive director since 2017. Works performed have included Claudio Monteverdi’s operas and 1610 Vespers, Georg Philipp Telemann’s Day of Judgment, Mozart’s Idomeneo, numerous Handel operas and oratorios, and the major choral works of J. S. Bach. In recent seasons, Music of the Baroque has given modern premieres of several works by Telemann, including the cantatas "Nun ist das Heil und die Kraft," "Dich rühmen die Welten," and "Siehe, das ist Gottes Lamm."

The ensemble announced the details of its 50th-anniversary season in February 2020. Opening in September, programs will include Haydn's Creation, the group's first-ever performance of all six of Bach's Brandenburg Concertos in the same evening, the group's first performances in a decade of Handel's Messiah at Thanksgiving, and Venezuelan pianist Gabriela Montero's debut with the group in performances of Mozart's Piano Concerto No. 21. Andrew Megill, conductor of the Montreal Symphony Chorus and the Carmel Bach Festival Chorale, will lead the Holiday Brass & Choral Concerts in December, the ensemble's longest-running tradition.

Joining Music of the Baroque as guest conductor for the first time is renowned early music specialist John Butt, founder and director of Scotland's Dunedin Consort. Butt will lead the orchestra in a program featuring concertos by Vivaldi and others.

The cornerstone of the 50th-anniversary celebration will be the ensemble's first performances in over a decade of Bach's monumental Passion According to St. Matthew, featuring critically acclaimed British tenor James Gilchrist singing the role of the Evangelist. The performances will also serve as the second installment of the group's four-recording Bach project.

The group will also present its second Baroque in the Park, an open-air performance on the stage of the Pritzker Pavilion featuring highlights of the 50th season and other Baroque works.

During the summer of 2025, the Music of the Baroque Chorus travelled to Aspen, Colorado, to perform Handel's Messiah at the Aspen Music Festival and School under the baton of their music director, Jane Glover. It was the first time that Messiah was performed in the festival's 75-year history.

== Wikman discography ==
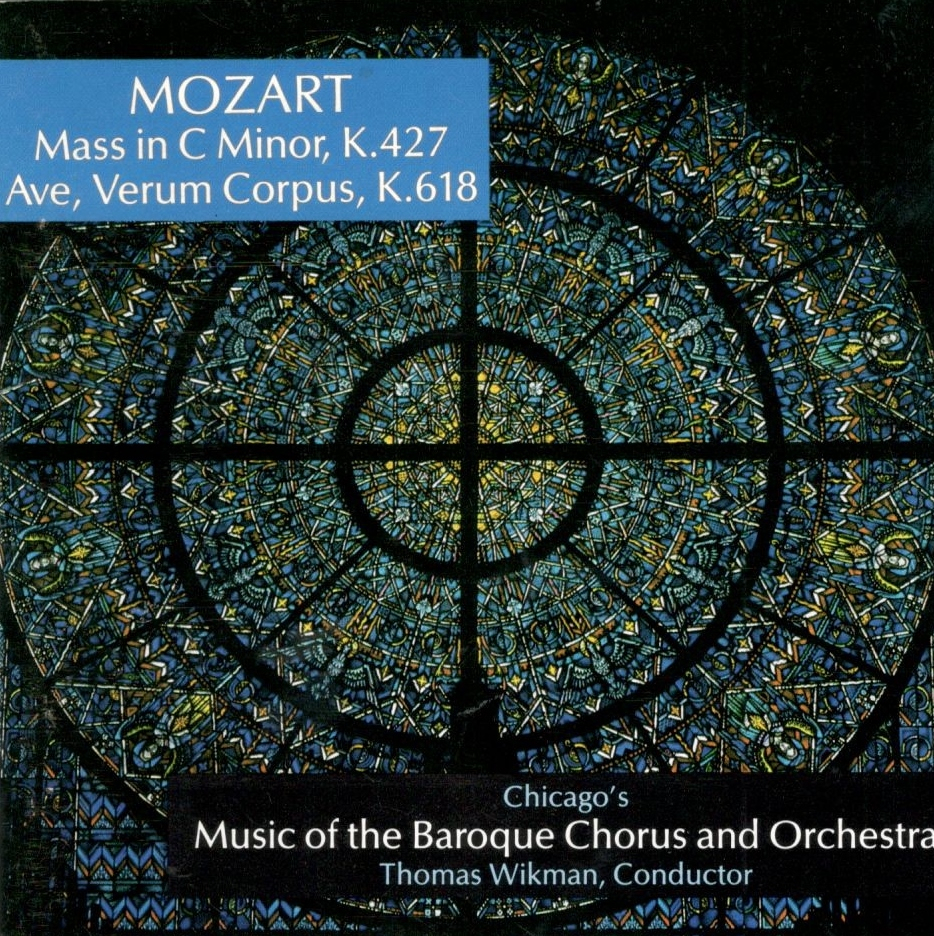

• 1981: Brass and Choral Music

• 1982: Brass and Choral Music for Christmastide

• 1982: Terpsichore Danserye

• 1983: Monteverdi's Vespers of The Blessed Virgin (1610)

• 1985: Vom Himmel Hoch

• 1990: Mozart's Great Mass in C Major

• 1995 Telemann's Day of Judgement

• 1997: Music for Baroque Trumpet: With Clarion Voice

== Recent recordings ==
Music of the Baroque's available recordings include "Glover Conducts Mozart," featuring Symphonies 40 and 41; "Mother & Child," recorded live during the ensemble's 2013 holiday concerts and conducted by Paul Agnew; "On This Night," recorded live during the ensemble's 2017 holiday concerts and conducted by William Jon Gray; and Telemann's Day of Judgement. The ensemble plans to release a recording of Bach's Mass in B Minor, recorded live in September 2019 and conducted by Music Director Jane Glover, in late 2020.

== Educational outreach ==
Beginning in the 1984–85 season, Music of the Baroque undertook an educational outreach program for more than 200 Chicago-area high school students in collaboration with Urban Gateways. Students studied the score of the music selected by Wikman for performance in their classes; students also attended rehearsals and performances by Music of the Baroque. Music of the Baroque continues this tradition through its "Strong Voices" program where it conducts arts education to support and enhance music education programs at Chicago public high schools. Combining individual and group vocal instruction by Music of the Baroque chorus members with exposure to professional musical performances, the program currently includes Brooks High School, Hubbard High School, Lane Technical High School, Lindblom Math and Science Academy, Senn High School, Simeon High School, and Solorio High School.
