= Jane Glover =

British conductor and music scholar

Dame Jane Glover DBE
- Born: 13 May 1949 (age 77)
- Education: Haberdashers' Monmouth School; St Hugh's College, Oxford
- Occupations: Conductor; Music scholar
- Organizations: London Mozart Players; Music of the Baroque; Royal College of Music; Royal Academy of Music
- Awards: Dame Commander of the Order of the British Empire
- Website: www.jane-glover.com

Dame Jane Alison Glover (born 13 May 1949) is a British conductor and musicologist.

== Early life ==
Born in Helmsley, Glover attended Haberdashers' Monmouth School for Girls. Her father, Robert Finlay Glover, MA (TCD), was headmaster of Monmouth School and it was through this connection that she was able to meet Benjamin Britten and Peter Pears aged only 16. She later described the meeting:

"I was beside myself with the prospect of hearing them perform. On the afternoon of the concert, the doorbell rang at the headmaster's house, and I went to answer it. There on the step, looking for all the world as they did on one of my record sleeves, distinguished, elegant and with the kindliest of eyes, were Peter Pears and Benjamin Britten my hero."

After reading Music as an undergraduate at St Hugh's College, Oxford, she went on to complete a DPhil on 17th-century Venetian Opera. In 1978 Glover published a study of Francesco Cavalli ('Cavalli', Batsford), and included material derived from her doctoral thesis. Musical friends at Oxford included Stephen Oliver and John Owen Edwards, and the three gave concert performances with two pianos of all the Savoy operas.

In 1990, after a sizeable donation, the Glover Music School was opened at Monmouth School by Jane Glover, in memory of her father. Her brother, Richard Glover, served as Master Haberdasher (2015–16).

== Career ==
Glover first conducted at Oxford as a student, in a production of Athalia, and, having conducted the Oxford University Opera Club's 1971 production of Le nozze de Figaro, she edited and conducted Cavalli's Rosinda in October 1973, the first in modern times. In 2001 she described the first night as "probably one of the most exciting nights of my life. It was like giving birth. I had transcribed the opera from the composer's autograph, which had lain on that shelf for 300-odd years. People reacted to it. That was the real thrill for me, to hear people laughing, applauding and having a good time".

She made her professional debut at the Wexford Festival in 1975 with the first modern performance of Eritrea and joined Glyndebourne in 1979. She was music director of Glyndebourne Touring Opera from 1981 to 1985. She has been both principal conductor and principal guest conductor of the Huddersfield Choral Society and continues to work with the choir on a semi-regular basis. She conducted the world premiere of Il Giardino by Stephen Oliver at the Batignano Festival in 1977.

During the 1980s, Glover regularly broadcast on BBC Television including presenting Proms and the Leeds International Piano Competition, writing and hosting the television series Orchestra with Jane Glover first broadcast in 1983 and Mozart – His Life with Music in 1985.

Glover was the music director of the London Mozart Players from 1984 to 1991. Her first concert season with them was devoted especially to Mozart, including letters and other documents read by Simon Callow but by 1986 she began exploring contemporary works in the programmes "to the encouraging applause of the critics and the mounting dismay of some members of the Haydn-Mozart Society". Glover was a BBC governor from 1990 to 1995. As part of the 1993 Covent Garden Festival she conducted British Youth Opera in The Magic Flute at the Grand Temple in the Freemasons' Hall, which marked the first time women had been present there. She conducted the Ken Russell production of Princess Ida for ENO at the Coliseum Theatre in 1992. Since 2002, she has been Music Director of the Chicago ensemble Music of the Baroque.

Glover is a Fellow of the Royal College of Music and was the artistic director of opera at the Royal Academy of Music between 2009 and 2016. On 18 March 2011, she conducted the world première of Sir Peter Maxwell Davies's opera Kommilitonen! at the Academy.

In December 2013, she became the third woman ever to conduct at the Metropolitan Opera of New York, leading Mozart's The Magic Flute in the production of Julie Taymor. She has been a regular collaborator with choreographer Mark Morris.

In January 2023, Glover first guest-conducted the Fort Worth Symphony Orchestra (FWSO). In February 2024, the FWSO announced the appointment of Glover as its next principal guest conductor, the first female conductor ever named to the post, effective 1 August 2025.

=== Honours ===
Glover was appointed a Commander of the Order of the British Empire (CBE) in the 2003 New Year Honours and a Dame Commander of the Order of the British Empire (DBE) in the 2021 New Year Honours for services to music. She is a Fellow of the Royal College of Music.

=== Writings and recordings ===
In September 2005, Macmillan published Glover's book Mozart's Women: His Family, His Friends, His Music. The book investigates the extent to which the women surrounding Mozart – his mother, sister, wife and his wife's sisters – influenced his development as a composer. In 2018, her Handel in London: The Making of a Genius, was published, which charts the composer's work as "immigrant musical genius, composer, performer and impresario", placed in the social and political context of London of the time.

Glover's recordings include Cavalli (La Calisto - extracts), Handel (Messiah; Water Music suites 1-3), Haydn (Symphonies 80, 87, 89, 101, 102, 103, 104; 'Harmoniemesse' and 'Schöpfungsmesse', Mozart (Symphonies 25, 26, 27, 28, 29, 30, 31, 32, 33, 35, 36, 38, 39, 40, 41; Divertimenti K. 136-K. 138 & Serenade K. 525, "Eine Kleine Nachtmusik"; Serenade for 13 Wind Instruments K361; Requiem K.626), Mendelssohn (Violin Concerto Op. 64; "A Midsummer Night's Dream" incidental music), a complete recording of Façade with Timothy West and Prunella Scales,Britten (Les Illuminations; Nocturne; Sinfonietta). She was chorus director for the 1985 recording of Dido and Aeneas featuring Jessye Norman.

== Works ==
- Cavalli. B. T. Batsford Ltd., London, 1978. (ISBN 0713410078 / 9780713410075)
- —— (September 2005). Mozart's Women: His Family, His Friends, His Music. Macmillan. ISBN 978-0330418584.
- Handel in London: The Making of a Genius. Pan Macmillan, 2018. ISBN 978-1-5098-8206-9.
- Mozart in Italy: Coming of Age in the Land of Opera, Picador, 2024. ISBN 978-1-5290-5986-1

Cultural offices
| Preceded by Nicholas Braithwaite | Music Director, Glyndebourne Touring Opera; 1981–1985 | Succeeded by Graeme Jenkins |
| Preceded by Harry Blech | Music Director, London Mozart Players; 1984–1991 | Succeeded by Matthias Bamert |
| Preceded by Thomas Strecker Wikman | Music Director, Music of the Baroque; 2002–present | Succeeded by incumbent |
