= Oristeo =

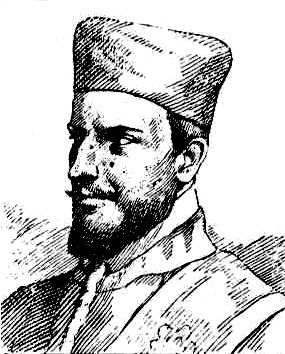
Francesco Cavalli

Oristeo is an opera in a prologue and three acts by Francesco Cavalli. It was designated as a dramma per musica. The Italian libretto was by Giovanni Faustini.

The opera is notable for containing one of the first examples of a da capo aria, Udite amanti, sung by Corinta.

== Performance history ==
It was first performed in Venice on the occasion of the inauguration of the Teatro Sant'Apollinare on 9 February 1651.

== Roles ==
| Role | Voice type | Premiere Cast, 1651 (Conductor: – ) |
|---|---|---|
| Diomeda, Princess of Caonia | soprano | |
| Oristeo, King of Epirus | baritone or bass | |
| Euralio, his son | soprano | |
| Trasimede, Prince of Archaea | tenor | |
| Corinta, Princess of Locri | soprano | |

== Recordings ==
Oristeo, Atto I Scena 4: Dimmi amor, che farò? Mariana Flores, Cappella Mediterranea, Leonardo García Alarcón 2014
