= Giovanni Faustini =

Venetian librettist and opera impresario

Giovanni Faustini (1615 – 19 December 1651) was a Venetian librettist and opera impresario of the 17th century. He is best remembered for his collaborations with the composer Francesco Cavalli.

== Life and career ==
Faustini was born in Venice. Impresario at the Teatro San Cassiano, Teatro San Moisè and Teatro Sant'Apollinare, his 14 libretti were mostly set by Cavalli, with a few being used by other composers. The libretti Faustini left incomplete at his death were later finished by his brother Marco Faustini, who continued his brother's career as impresario at multiple theatres.

Three of his librettos are based on mythological themes, but these are exceptions rather than the rule. A typical Faustini plot relies not on myth or classical history but upon his own imagination. He based his creative thinking upon a fundamental pattern of two pair of aristocratic lovers from exotic nations, who undergo a lengthy process of separation and reconciliation, assisted by a good number of clownish servants who provide comic relief. Many devices from Roman comedy and the pastoral genre also appear, such as sleeping potions and letters delivered to the wrong person. Faustini was heavily committed to his career as a professional librettist, and his work with Cavalli was of vital importance in the development of Venetian opera.

== Librettos ==
- La virtù de' strali d'Amore (music by Francesco Cavalli, 1642)
- Egisto (music by Francesco Cavalli, 1643; music by Benedetto Ferrari, 1651)
- Ormindo (music by Francesco Cavalli, 1644)
- Doriclea (music by Francesco Cavalli, 1645; music by Pietro Andrea Ziani, 1666)
- Titone (music by Francesco Cavalli, 1645)
- Euripo (music by Francesco Cavalli, 1649)
- Oristeo (music by Francesco Cavalli, 1651)
- Rosinda (music by Francesco Cavalli, 1651)
- La Calisto (music by Francesco Cavalli, 1651)
- Eritrea (music by Francesco Cavalli, 1652)
- Eupatra (music by Pietro Andrea Ziani, 1655; music by Giovanni Battista Costanzi, 1730)
- Elena (completed by Nicolò Minato; music by Francesco Cavalli, 1659)
- Il tiranno humiliato d’amore, ovvero Il Meraspe (revised by Nicolò Beregan; music by Carlo Pallavicino, 1667)
- Alciade (music by Pietro Andrea Ziani, 1667)

== Bibliography ==
- B. Brunelli: L’impresario in angustie, Rivista italiana del dramma, iii (1941), 311–41
- J. Glover: The Teatro Sant’Apollinare and the Development of Seventeenth-Century Venetian Opera (diss., U. of Oxford, 1975)
- J. Glover: Cavalli (London, 1978)
- G. Morelli: Scompiglio e lamento (simmetrie dell’incostanza e incostanza delle simmetre): ‘L’Egisto’ di Faustini e Cavalli (Venice, 1982)
- E. Rosand: Opera in Seventeenth-Century Venice: the Creation of a Genre (Berkeley, 1990)
