= Artemisia (Cavalli) =

Title page of the original libretto

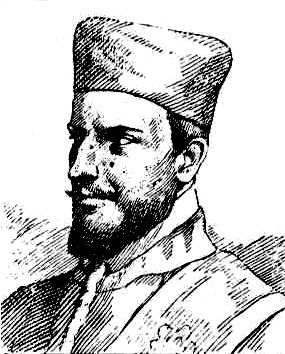
Francesco Cavalli

Artemisia is an opera ("dramma per musica") in three acts and a prologue by the Italian composer Francesco Cavalli from a libretto written by Nicolò Minato. It was first performed at the Teatro San Giovanni e San Paolo, Venice on 10 January 1657 and revived in Naples in 1658, Palermo in 1659, Milan in 1663 and Genoa in 1665.

== Performance history ==
The performances included a number of substitution arias, and in the 1656 libretto, next to Erillo's aria "Chiedete e sperate", was noted the instruction "a different aria to be sung every night".

Artemisia was performed by Helios Early Opera in Cambridge, Massachusetts, in January 2013, the North American premiere of the work.

== Synopsis ==
The story is based on the convention which Cavalli had established in several of his 10 earlier operas with the librettist Faustini. It features two pairs of crossed lovers reunited by a benign monarch, and is a story of love, betrayal, virtue and honour set in the Venetian Republic. It touches on politics, social issues and the moral values of three couples.

== Recordings ==
- Artemisia: Francesca Lombardi Mazzulli, Roberta Mameli, Marina Bartoli, La Venexiana, Claudio Cavina, Glossa 2011
