= Tron Theater =

Tron Theater may refer to:

- Teatro San Cassiano, formerly in Venice
- Tron Theatre, Scotland
