= Eritrea (opera) =

Opera act by Italian composer Francesco Cavalli

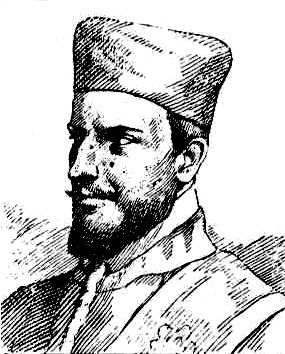
Francesco Cavalli

Eritrea is an opera in three acts by the Italian composer Francesco Cavalli. The libretto is by Giovanni Faustini. It was premiered at the Teatro Sant'Apollinare in Venice on 17 January 1652, and revived in modern times at the Wexford Festival in 1975 under the conductor Jane Glover.

== Recordings ==
- from prologue: "Ne le grotte arimaspe", Mariana Flores, Cappella Mediterranea, Leonardo García Alarcón, 2014
- Duet: "O luci belle", Giulia Semenzato (soprano), Raffaele Pe (alto) La Venexiana, Claudio Cavina, 2015
