= Mutio =

Mutio may refer to:

- Mutio Baroni, husband of Adriana Basile and Leonora Baroni
- Mutio Vitelleschi, the 6th Superior General of the Society of Jesus
- Mutio Scevola, an opera by the Italian composer Francesco Cavalli
- Florencia Mutio, Argentine field hockey player
- Mutio, a character on the anime Blue Submarine No. 6
