= L'Orione =

1653 opera by Francesco Cavalli

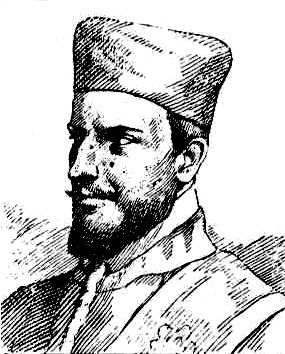
Francesco Cavalli

L'Orione (Orion) is an opera in three acts and a prologue by the Italian composer Francesco Cavalli with a libretto by Francesco Melosio. It was first performed at the Royal Palace of Milan, in June 1653 to celebrate the election of Ferdinand IV as King of the Romans. The libretto had originally been written for the Teatro San Moisè, Venice, in 1642. Orione was revived in Santa Fe, New Mexico, in 1983 by the conductor and musicologist Raymond Leppard.

== Roles ==
Roles, voice type / part clef
Role	Voice type/part clef
Orione, the hunter	Tenor / C1
Diana, goddess of the hunt	mezzo-soprano / C1
Aurora, goddess of the daw	mezzo-soprano / F4
Castore	C1
Ercole	F4
Taumanti	C3
Filotero, Orione's companion	baritone / F4
Vulcano, god of fire	bass / F4
Bronte, a Cyclops	F4
Sterope, a Cyclops	C4
Apollo, sun god, brother of Diana	tenor
Venere, goddess of love	mezzo-soprano / C3
Amor, Cupid, son of Venus	soprano / C1
Giove, father of the gods	tenor
Titone, a mortal, husband of Aurora	baritone
Nettuno, god of the sea	bass
Caronte	
Pluto	
Vecchia	
Una ninfa dell'Aurora	
Due ninfi di Diana	both / C1

== Recordings ==
- L'Orione, Cinzia Forte, Laura Polverelli, Margherita Tomasi, Alketa Cela, Sara Mingardo, Lorenzo Regazzo, Pietro Vultaggio, Francesc Garrigosa, Venice Baroque Orchestra Andrea Marcon, 2CDs Mondo Musica, 2001 OCLC 49338887
