= Statira principessa di Persia =

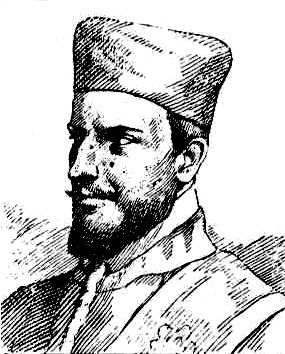
Francesco Cavalli

Statira principessa di Persia ('Stateira, Princess of Persia') is an opera (dramma per musica) in a prologue and three acts by Francesco Cavalli, set to a libretto by Giovanni Francesco Busenello. The opera was first performed in Venice at the Teatro SS. Giovanni e Paolo, on 18 January 1656.

== Roles ==
Role	Voice type	Premiere Cast, 18 January 1655 (Conductor: – )
Brisante	contralto	
Cloridaspe	mezzo-soprano	
Elissena	tenor	
Ermosilla	soprano	
Usimano	soprano	
Floralba	soprano	
Eurillo	soprano	
Maga	soprano	
Mercurio	tenor	
Brimonte	tenor	
Plutone	bass	
Nicarco	bass	
Dario	bass	
Statira	soprano	
Tersandro	soprano	
Vaffrino	tenor	
Servo Indiano	backing singer	

== Synopsis ==
In the epistle dedicatory to the original libretto, Busenello explains the plot as follows:

The king of Armenia, in concert with other Asian princes, engages in bloody battle with Darius III of Persia, and kidnaps his wife Parisatidis and daughter Stateira.

Cloridaspis, the young king of Arabia in love with Stateira, attacks the Armenians, sets Stateira and her mother free, and takes them back to Darius. Darius is so grateful to the king of Arabia for setting Stateira free – during which action he was gravely wounded – that he lets Stateira herself look after him. This she does with balsam and medicines, and in the royal gardens he is healed of all his ills. An occasion such as this could not procure any other effect than that the two fall in love; this the princess does, giving him signs of her ardent passion. This is where the opera begins.

Wherein:

Stateira, being a young woman and therefore incapable of keeping anything secret, speaks of her love to a servant girl, known as Ermosilla, but who is actually Usimano, an Egyptian prince. He was in love with Stateira and came to Persia dressed as a woman to work in the service of the princess. No sooner has Usimano learnt of Stateira's love for the Arab than he is seized with jealousy against him; this anger is the basis for all the drama, which is only resolved by a series of events as you shall see.

Floralba, Stateira's other servant girl, is in love with the Arab king and only later on finds out that she is his sister. She marries Usimano, Stateira marries Cloridaspis, but has to renounce the throne of Persia, which is then given by Darius to his son-in-law.

The writer protests that his words about divinities, gods, idols, stars, the heavens, destiny, fate, and other similar things, are simply an artifice of his pen and are purely to adorn some poetry or to stress some words. Although the author writes as a poet, he clearly lives and believes as a Christian.
