= Pompeo Magno =

1666 opera by Francesco Cavalli

Title page of the 1666 libretto

Pompeo Magno ('Pompeius Magnus', 'Pompey the Great') is a dramma per musica (opera) in three acts by Francesco Cavalli. The Italian libretto is by Nicolò Minato.

== Performance history ==
It was first performed in Venice at the Teatro San Salvatore on 20 February 1666.

== Roles ==
Role	Voice type	Premiere Cast, 20 February 1666 (Conductor: - )
Pompeo (Pompey)	alto	
Sesto (Sextus), his son	soprano	
Mitridate (Mithridates), King of Pontus	tenor	
Issicratea (Hypsicrateia), Queen of Pontus	soprano	
Farnace (Pharnaces), her son	soprano	
Harpalia, her slave	soprano	
Cesare (Caesar)	bass	
Claudio (Claudius), his son	tenor	
Giulia (Julia), his daughter	soprano	
Servilio (Servilius), her lover	soprano	
Crasso (Crassus)	tenor	

== Recordings ==
- 2014: Atto I Scena 17: Come al mar corrono i fiumi Cappella Mediterranea, Leonardo García Alarcón, Clematis, Thomas Dunford, Sarah Van Oudenhove, Mariana Flores 2014
- 2015: "Alpi gelate" Giulia Semenzato (soprano) La Venexiana Claudio Cavina 2015
- 2025 (4k video): Max Emanuel Cenčić as Pompeo, Mariana Flores as Issicratea, Valerio Contaldo as Mitridate, Alois Mühlbacher as Amore/Farnace, Nicolò Balducci as Sesto, Sophie Junker as Giulia, Victor Sicard as Cesare, Nicholas Scott as Claudio, Valer Sabadus as Servilio, Jorge Navarro Colorado as Crasso, Dominique Visse as Delfo, Kacper Szelążek as Arpalia, Marcel Beekman as Atrea. Capella Mediterranea, conducted by Leonardo García Alarcón; Max Emanuel Cenčić, stage director. Recorded live, Bayreuth Baroque Opera Festival, September 2025, Margravial Opera House, Bayreuth, Germany.
