= Mutio Scevola =

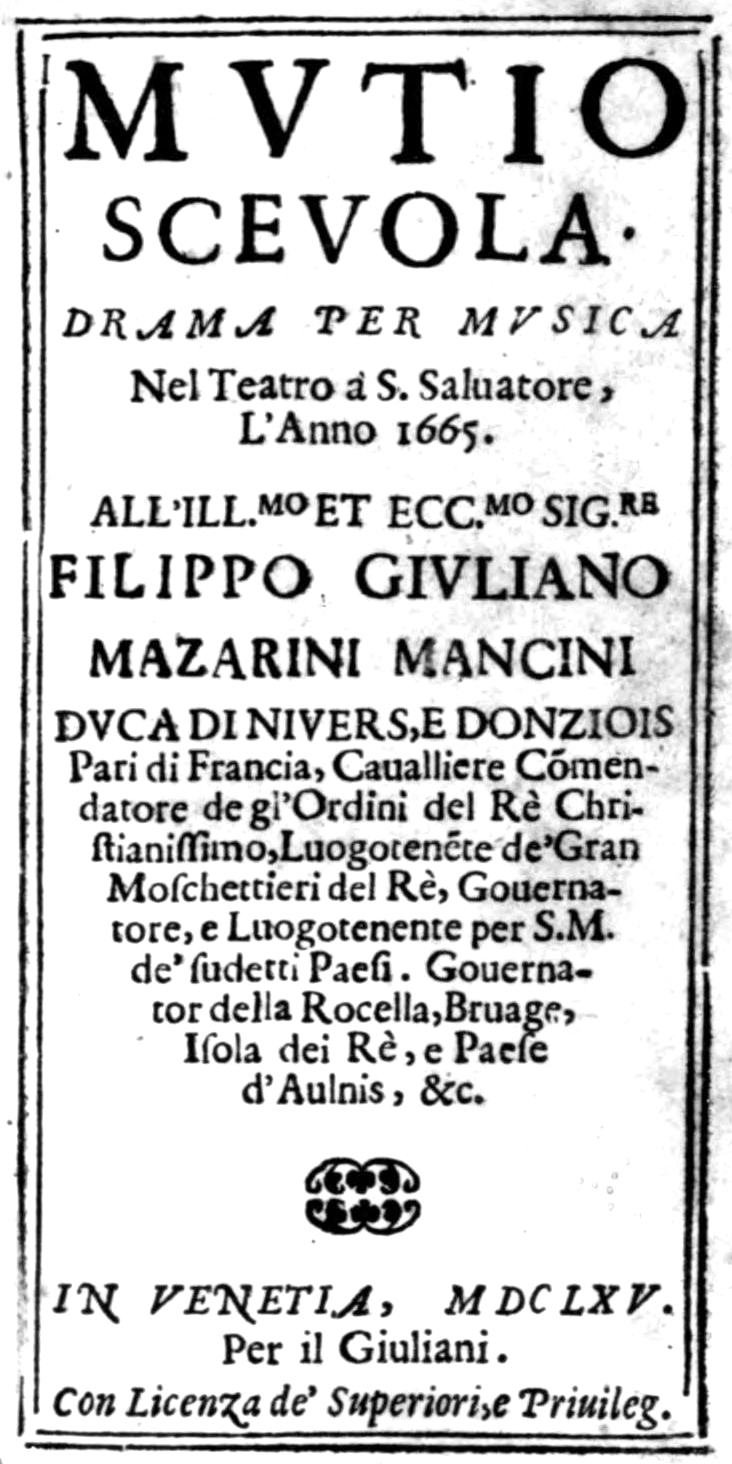
Title page of the 1665 Venetian libretto

Mutio Scevola or Muzio Scevola (Mucius Scaevola) is an opera (drama per musica) in three acts by the Italian composer Francesco Cavalli, with a libretto by Nicolò Minato. It was based on the story of the Roman hero, Gaius Mucius Scaevola. The opera was first performed at the Teatro San Salvatore, Venice on 26 January 1665 and revived in Bologna in 1667. The libretto is dedicated to Philippe Jules Mancini, Duke of Nevers, the nephew of Cardinal Mazarin.

== Roles ==
Role	Voice type	Premiere Cast, 26 January 1665 (Conductor: – )
Muzio Scevola	tenor	
Orazio	soprano	
Porsenna	tenor	
Publicola	bass	
Melvio	contralto	
Tarquinio	bass	
Valeria	soprano	
Elisa	soprano	
Vitellia	soprano	
Ismeno	bass	
Clodio	contralto	
Floro	soprano	
Porfiria	contralto	
Milo	contralto	
Publio	tenor	
La statua di Giano	bass	
Pallade	contralto	
Venere	indefinite	
Two vestal virgins	backing singers	

== Recordings ==
- Atto I Scena 7 "Né fastosa allor che ride - Né dolente allor che freme" Cappella Mediterranea, Leonardo García Alarcón, François Joubert-Caillet, Mariana Flores, Anna Reinhold 2014
- "L'aspetto feroce" Giulia Semenzato (soprano), Raffaele Pe (alto) La Venexiana Claudio Cavina 2015
