= Elena (Cavalli) =

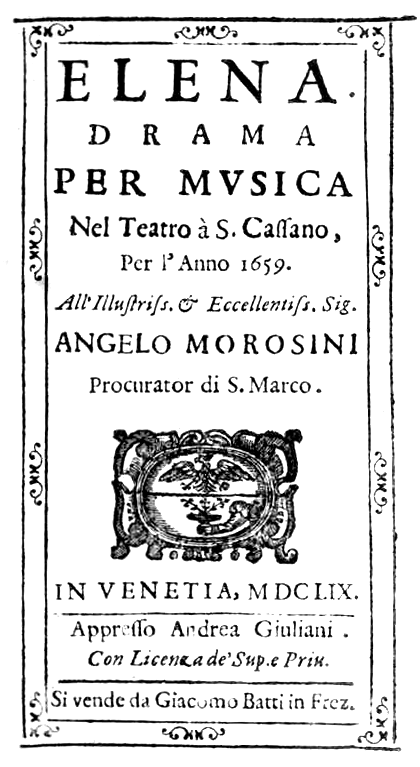
1659 libretto

Elena is a 1659 dramma per musica in a prologue and three acts by Francesco Cavalli. It is set to a libretto initiated by Giovanni Faustini (who died in 1651) and completed by Nicolò Minato, and it was first performed in Venice at the Teatro San Cassiano (the dedication is 26 December 1659). Elena was revived in 1661 in Palermo but then not heard again until 2013, at the Aix-en-Provence Festival.

Just like many other operas by Cavalli, Elena includes a ballo, or an Italian dance which incorporates singers, choristers, and instrumentalists. However, it soon began to be replaced by something analogous to the intermedio, sometimes incorporating a chorus.

== Roles ==
Character	Voice Type
Discordia disguised as peace	Soprano
Venus	Soprano
Peace	Soprano
Wealth	Silent role
Truth	Soprano
Love	Silent role
Pallas	Soprano
Abundance	Silent role
Two Furies	Silent role
Tyndareus	Bass
Helena	Soprano
Menelaus	Soprano
Tesedo	Tenor
Peritoo	Alto
Hippolyta	Soprano
Eurite	Alto
Erginda	Soprano
Diomedes	Tenor
Eurypylus	Tenor
Iro	Tenor
Creon	Tenor
Menesteo	Soprano
Antilochus	Tenor
Castore	Soprano
Pollux	Soprano
Neptune	Bass
Choirs of Cerulean Deities	Soprano, Contralto, Tenor
Argonauti e Schiavi	Tenor, Bass

== Plot ==
The Greek prince Menelaus (nephew of the king of Crete Atreus) and Theseus, king of Athens, are in love with Helen, a woman of rare beauty, famous for the fire of Troy. Menelaus, to get closer to Helen, dresses as a woman to come and serve her by pretending to be an Amazon. One day Peritous, seeing him in women's clothes fighting with Elena and therefore believing him to be a woman, falls in love with her. Theseus kidnaps Helen, since he had sworn not to marry except with a daughter of Jupiter - and Helen was reputed to have been fathered by Jupiter in the guise of a swan. To kidnap Helen, he abandons Hippolyta, a prisoner received as a gift from Hercules and in love with Theseus, who when she goes to look for him discovers that he has kidnapped Helen and is therefore disdained and torn in her love for her. Helen will be freed by her brothers, Castor and Pollux; Hippolyta's affection strikes Theseus, who decides to marry her; Menelaus, having discovered himself, marries Helen.

== Recordings ==
- Video live Emőke Baráth (Elena, Venere), Valer Barna-Sabadus (Menelao), Fernando Guimarães (Teseo), Rodrigo Ferreira (Ippolita, Pallade: Solenn’ Lavanant Linke Peritoo), Emiliano Gonzalez Toro (Iro), Anna Reinhold (Tindaro, Nettuno), Mariana Flores (Erginda, Giunone, Castore), Majdouline Zerari (Eurite, La Verita),...Aix-en-Provence Festival, July 2013. DVD - conductor Leonardo García Alarcón, director Jean-Yves Ruf. Ricercar
