= Orimonte =

1650 opera by Francesco Cavalli

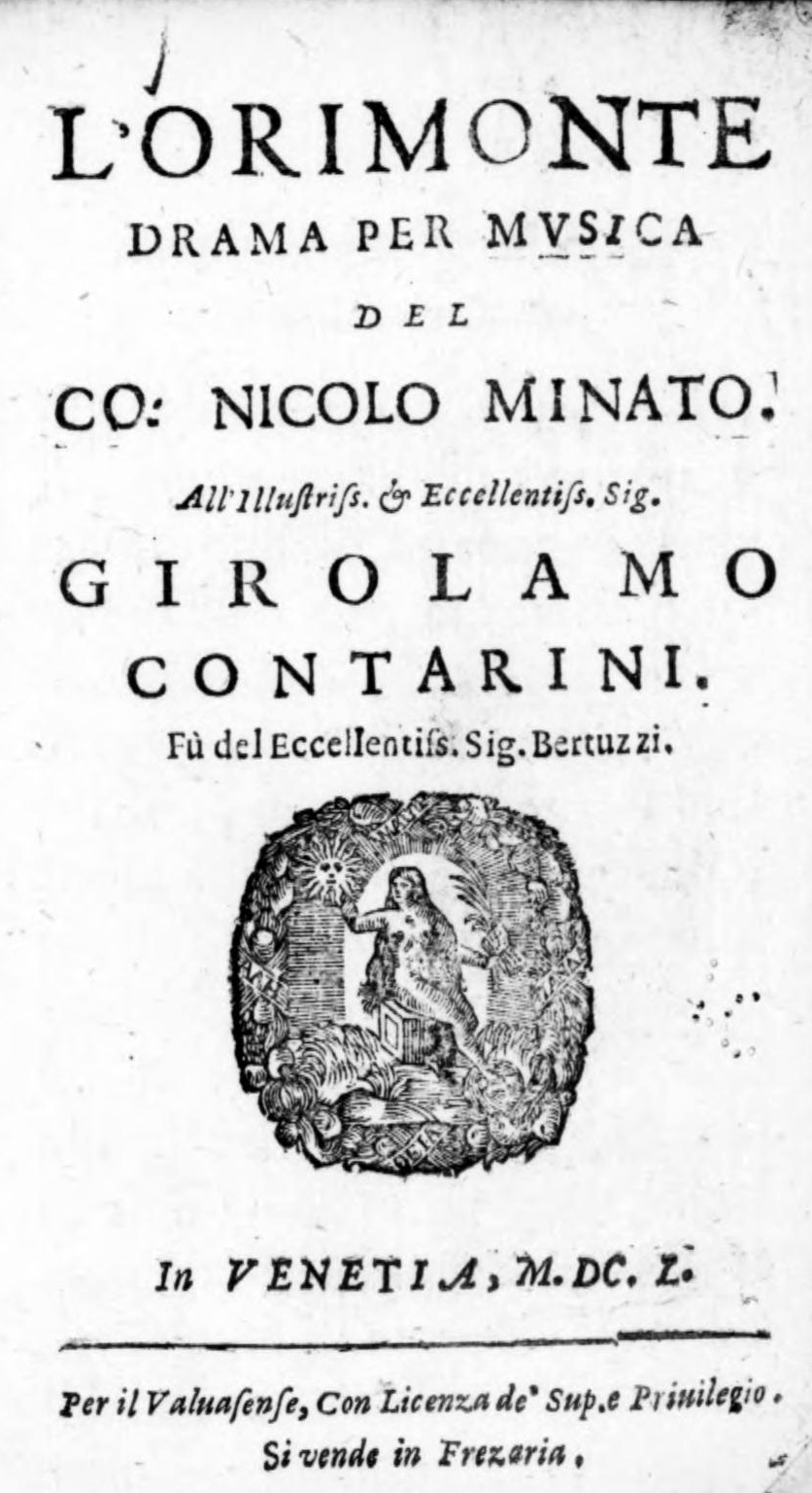
Title page of 1650 libretto

Orimonte is an opera in a prologue and three acts by the Italian composer Francesco Cavalli with a libretto by Niccolò Minato. It was first performed at the Teatro San Cassiano, Venice on 20 February 1650.

== Recordings ==
- duet "Qui cadè al tuo piè" Giulia Semenzato (soprano), Raffaele Pe (alto), La Venexiana Claudio Cavina 2015
