= Thomas Walker (musicologist) =

Thomas Walker (5 November 1936 – 21 October 1995) was an American musicologist who specialized in 17th- and 18th-century Italian opera and the music of Carl Nielsen. He received his bachelor's degree in music at Harvard College in 1961. He did graduate work at the University of California, Berkeley from 1963 to 1968 and was Professor of Music at Princeton University from 1989 to 1995.
