= La virtù de' strali d'Amore =

XVIIth century Italian opera by Francesco Cavalli

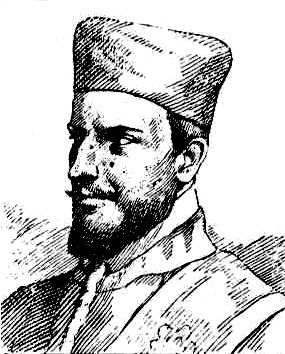
Francesco Cavalli

La virtù de' strali d'Amore (The Power of Cupid's Arrows) is an opera in a prologue and three acts by the Italian composer Francesco Cavalli to a libretto by Giovanni Faustini. It premiered at the Teatro San Cassiano, Venice in 1642 and was revived in Bologna in 1648.

The opera was recently revived by Bowling Green State University, in collaboration with the Eastman School of Music, in the fall of 2007, and again at the Teatro Malibran in Venice in September 2008.

== Roles ==
Role	Voice type	Premiere Cast, 1642 (Conductor: - )
Erabena, princess of Athens, disguised as the servant Eumete	soprano	
Meonte, Erabena's wayward lover	tenor	
Amore, god of love	soprano	
Pallante, prince of Thrace	tenor	
Cleria, princess of Cyprus	soprano	
Erino, Pallante's servant	soprano	
Venere, goddess of love and mother of Amore	soprano	
Marte, god of war and lover of Venere	baritone	
Giove, king of the gods	baritone	
Mercurio, messenger of Giove	tenor	
Saturno, god of the harvest	baritone	
Aurora, goddess of dawn	soprano	
Fama, goddess of rumor	soprano	
Clito and Leucippe, Cleria's friends	soprani	
Cleandra, a good sorceress	soprano	
Darete, prince of Cyprus	baritone	
Ericlea, an evil sorceress queen	soprano	
Evagora, king of Cyprus	baritone	
Clarindo, a peasant	soprano	
Dalinda, his lover	soprano	
Alfisa, Dalinda's sister	soprano	
Two sailors	tenor and baritone	

== Synopsis ==
(The order of scenes is taken from the 2007 production at BGSU.)

=== Act 1 ===
Scene 1

Prince Pallante of Thrace and his servant Erino come upon Clarindo, Dalinda, and Alfisa, who tell him about Prince Darete, kidnapped by the sorceress queen of Thessaly, Ericlea, as revenge for spurning her advances. Pallante bemoans the fact that Clarindo and Dalinda can have each other, but he can never have his love, Princess Cleria of Cyprus (Darete's sister), who spurns him although he rescued her. Pallante sees the servant Eumete, who tells him that she is waiting for his master Meonte to return. Cleria is pursued by Meonte, who has fallen in love with her, and cries for help; Pallante rushes to defend her and wounds Meonte. Eumete rushes to his side and, believing him dead, attempts to commit suicide, but is stopped by two sailors. Cleandra, a sorceress, appears and takes Meonte off in her ship to heal him.

Scene 2

Cleria recounts to her friends Clito and Leucippe the story of how Meonte tried to carry her off to his ship, but Pallante fought him off, and she, not wanting to be with either of them, ran away and wished them both dead. Her friends berate her for not being grateful to her rescuer, but Cleria blames the stars for her cruelty and swears that she will never love. Realizing that this is the wood where Ericlea is holding Darete captive, they flee. Pallante and Erino appear, quite confident that Meonte is dead. Erino advises Pallante to be more forceful and seize love; after Pallante exits, though, he says to himself that love is painful and he does not wish to subject himself to it. He falls asleep.

Scene 3

Ericlea and her evil spirits torture Darete.

=== Act 2 ===
Scene 1

A chorus of gods praises Venere, the goddess of love; Venere and Amore, her son and keeper of the arrows of love, praise each other's powers of love. Marte, god of war, asks Amore to take pity on Pallante and make Cleria love him. Amore insults Marte, who then threatens him, and Amore flees. Marte, Venere, and the chorus of gods warn that Amore and his arrows will be dangerous.

Scene 2

Erino tells Pallante about the evil spirits he saw the night before; they exit into the woods. Amore enters, vowing to punish Venere and Marte for mocking him, and to make sure that Pallante will never be happy. He falls asleep. Eumete enters, lamenting tormented love, and reveals to the audience that she is actually Erabena, as the daughter of the king of Athens, and Meonte's spurned lover (Aria: “Weep, o rivers”). Seeing Amore asleep on the ground, she stabs him in anger with one of his own arrows; he wakes, suddenly desperately in love with her. She runs away and he pursues her.

Scene 3

Meonte thanks Cleandra for healing him and asks how he can repay her; she says that it is what she owes him for rescuing her from the magician Oronte. She prophesies that he will rejoice in love before the end of the day, and then will fight with a great lion. He wonders about the prophecies, then goes off to find Eumete.

Scene 4

Psiche searches for her husband Amore, lamenting that this is her fate for having loved a youth. Fama, goddess of rumor, tells her what happened with Amore and Erabena. Psiche appeals to Giove, king of the gods, to help return Amore to her; Giove sends Saturno and Mercurio to earth to recover Amore.

Scene 5

Amore pursues Erabena, promising to make her a goddess if she returns his love. Erabena replies that love only brings suffering. She runs off, leaving Amore to lament his unrequited love. Mercurio and Saturno grab Amore and return him to the heavens, leaving his arrows scattered on the ground.

=== Act 3 ===
Scene 1

Pallante tells of his adoration of Cleria again; then, hearing her enter, he and Erino hide. Cleria begs her father, Evagora, to let her live as a follower of Diana instead of getting married, but he advises her to love Pallante, as it is a fair reward for his having rescued her. Cleria says that she would rather marry Death. Evagora exits; Leucippe and Clito advise Cleria to love, but she says that she prefers her freedom. Seeing an arrow on the ground, she picks it up and accidentally pricks her finger. Pallante runs out to make sure she is all right, and she falls madly in love with him. They all marvel at how powerful Amore and his arrows are. Pallante tells Cleria that he must go rescue Darete, but he will soon return to her.

Scene 2

Meonte wanders in, searching for Eumete. He and Erabena find each other, and she recounts to him a dream in which Erabena accuses Meonte of unfaithfulness. Meonte admits that he has spurned her for Cleria, saying that it is not his fault, but Amore's. When he says he would not return to Erabena, she challenges him to a duel as Erabena's champion, using as her weapon one of Amore's arrows. She stabs him, and he falls in love with her again. When she reveals himself, Meonte realizes what Cleandra's prediction meant. Mercurio enters, telling Erabena that it is not permitted for a mortal to use Amore's arrows, and takes the arrows away. Meonte and Eumete leave, and Mercurio invites all women to come with him and feel the power of Amore's arrows (Aria: “Ladies, if you want to love”).

Scene 3

Pallante defeats Ericlea and her demons by breaking the magic urn.

Scene 4

Darete appears, and Pallante explains to him what has happened. Meonte and Erabena appear; Meonte recognizes Pallante as the one who wounded him and challenges him to a fight. Erabena tries to stop them but cannot. Cleandra enters and stops the fight, revealing that Meonte and Pallante are long-lost brothers. Evagora is reunited with his son Darete, and promises Pallante Cleria's hand in marriage. Erabena and Meonte rejoice at the change in destiny and love.

Scene 5

Amore, back in heaven, explains that time has cured his love for Erabena. Venere advises him to forget the fight with Marte, to which he agrees. Psiche demands to know why he left her; he says that it was the fault of his arrows. She replies that that is no excuse, and promises that she will have her vengeance in the form of many kisses.

== Performances ==
Gabriel Garrido 2009

DVD release: Naxos
