= Didone (opera) =

Opera by Francesco Cavalli

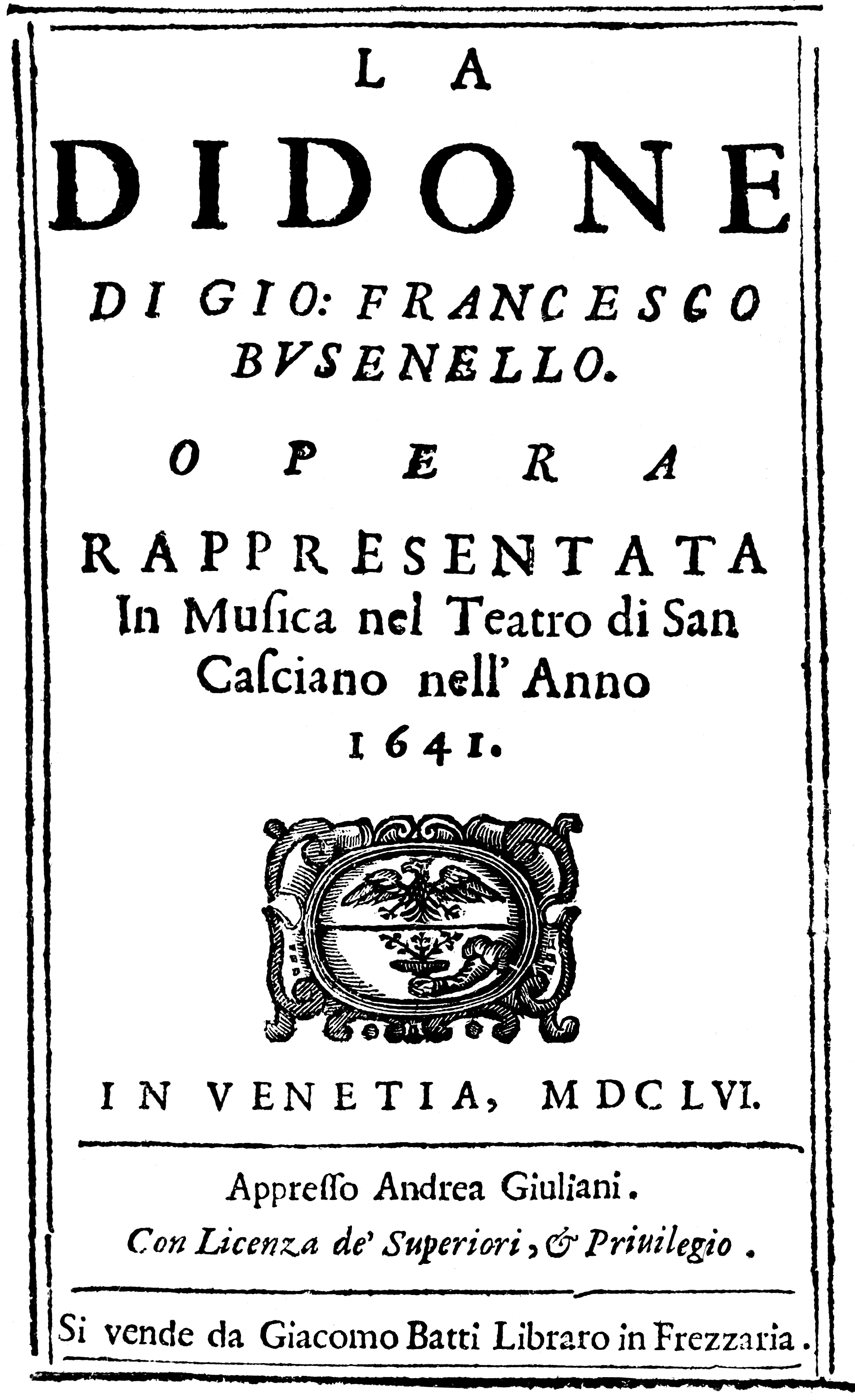
Title page of the 1656 libretto

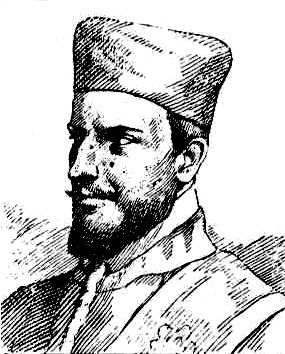
Francesco Cavalli

La Didone is an opera by Francesco Cavalli, set to a libretto by Giovanni Francesco Busenello (later librettist for Claudio Monteverdi). The opera was first performed at Venice's Teatro San Cassiano during 1640.

The plot is based on Virgil's Aeneid (Book 4 in particular), though Busenello, in his second libretto for Cavalli, replaces Dido's tragic suicide of Virgil with a happy ending in which Dido marries Iarbas, King of the Getuli, who saves Dido from herself after Aeneas abandons her. The action is divided into a prologue and 3 acts.

== Roles ==
Role	Voice type	Premiere Cast, 1640 (Conductor: - )
Enea	tenor	
Didone	soprano	
Iarbas	contralto	
Cassandra	soprano	
Anchise	tenor	
Ascanio	soprano	
Hecuba	contralto	
Creusa	soprano	
Anna	soprano	
Mercurio	contralto	
Sicheo	tenor	
Pirro	tenor	
Corebo	contralto	
Sinon Greco	bass	
Ambasciatore Ilionèo	contralto	
Acate	tenor	
Giove	bass	
Giunone	soprano	
Iride	soprano	
Venere	soprano	
Amore	soprano	
Nettuno	bass	
Eolo	tenor	
Fortuna	soprano	
Three court ladies	sopranos	

== Recordings ==
- Live Video recording on DVD - 2006 - Teatro Malibran, Venice - Fabio Biondi, conductor - Orchestra Europa Galante
  Cast: Claron McFadden, Magnus Staveland, Jordi Domènech, Manuela Custer, Marina De Liso, Donatella Lombardi - Dynamic cat. 33537

== See also ==
- Dido and Aeneas
