= Le nozze di Teti e di Peleo =

Opera of Francesco Cavalli

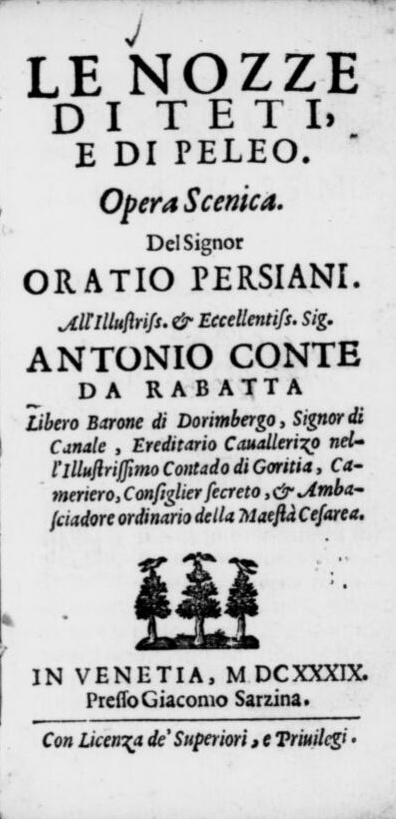
Title page of the libretto, 1639

Le nozze di Teti e di Peleo is an opera by Francesco Cavalli - specifically, an opera scenica or festa teatrale. The work, set to a libretto by Orazio Persiani, was Cavalli's first opera, and was first performed at the Venetian opera house Teatro San Cassiano on 24 January 1639. It is also the first Venetian opera for which a score survives to this day.

The plot is based upon the mythological tale of the wedding of Thetis and Peleus. Cavalli's scenes of divine activity require elaborate theatrical staging, and his score calls for plentiful activity of both chorus (who portray such different characters as gods, Tritons, Bacchantes, and demons) and dancers.

== Roles ==
| Role | Voice type | Premiere Cast, 24 January 1639 (Conductor: - ) |
|---|---|---|
| Thetis | soprano | |
| Jupiter | bass | |
| Aeolus | tenor | |
| Peleus | tenor | |
| Pluto | bass | |
| Discordia | contralto | |
| Hymen | soprano | |
| Momus | tenor | |
| Mercury | tenor | |
