= Doriclea (Cavalli) =

Opera by Francesco Cavalli

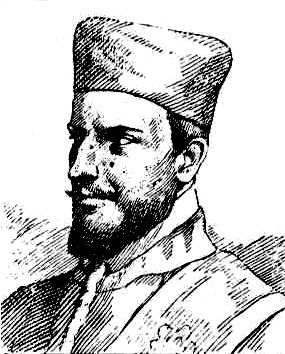
Francesco Cavalli

Doriclea is an opera in three acts and a prologue by the Italian composer Francesco Cavalli with a libretto by Giovanni Faustini. It was first performed at the Teatro San Cassiano, Venice in 1645.
