= Giovanni Francesco Busenello =

Venetian lawyer, librettist and poet

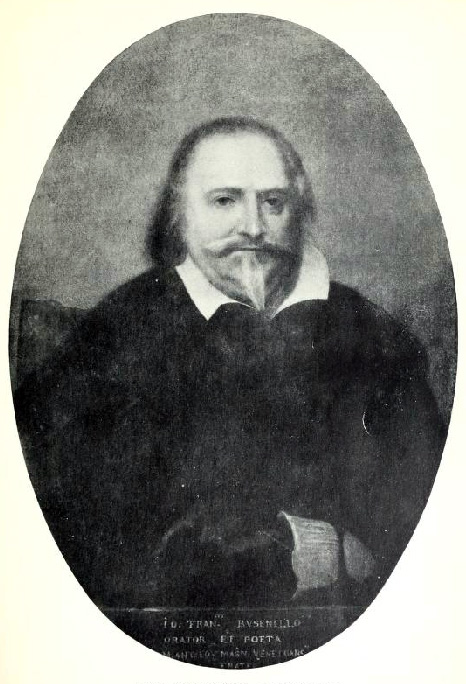
- Born: 24 September 1598 Venice
- Died: 27 October 1659 (aged 61)
- Occupation: lawyer
- Genre: poetry; libretto
- Literary movement: Baroque; Marinism
- Notable works: Delle hore ociose

Giovanni Francesco Busenello (24 September 1598 – 27 October 1659) was a Venetian lawyer, librettist and poet of the 17th century.

== Biography ==
Born to an upper-class family of Venice, he is believed to have studied at the University of Padua, where according to himself he was taught by Paolo Sarpi and Cesare Cremonino. He began to practice law in 1623, and is thought to have been highly successful in his chosen profession. He was a member of several literary academies, notably the Umoristi, the Imperfetti, and the Accademia degli Incogniti: the last of these was to dominate the literary aspect of Venetian opera for many years. Busenello's verse output was prolific, and included several poems addressed to singers. His poetry was greatly influenced by Giambattista Marino. He died at Legnaro, near Padua.

In musical history, he is best remembered for five libretti, each written for the Venetian opera and set by Claudio Monteverdi and Francesco Cavalli. They were published together in 1656 as Delle hore ociose ("Some idle hours") in Venice. His libretto for Gli amori d'Apollo e di Dafne (Cavalli, 1640) is heavily based on Giovanni Battista Guarini's Il pastor fido, while L'incoronazione di Poppea (1642), set by Monteverdi, is noted among early libretti for the strength and vividness with which the individual characters are sketched. His other works, all set by Cavalli, are La Didone (1641), La prosperità infelice di Giulio Cesare dittatore (1646, but music lost or possibly never composed) and La Statira (1655). Patrick J. Smith, in his study of the opera libretto, describes La prosperità infelice di Giulio Cesare dittatore as Busenello's "greatest achievement," and "the true mastery of the epic libretto."

Busenello also wrote a sixth libretto that he did not publish in his 1656 collected works, La Discesa di Enea all'Inferno (1640), identified by Arthur Livingston, the leading scholar on Busenello.
