= La Calisto =

Opera by Francesco Cavalli

- Opera by Francesco Cavalli
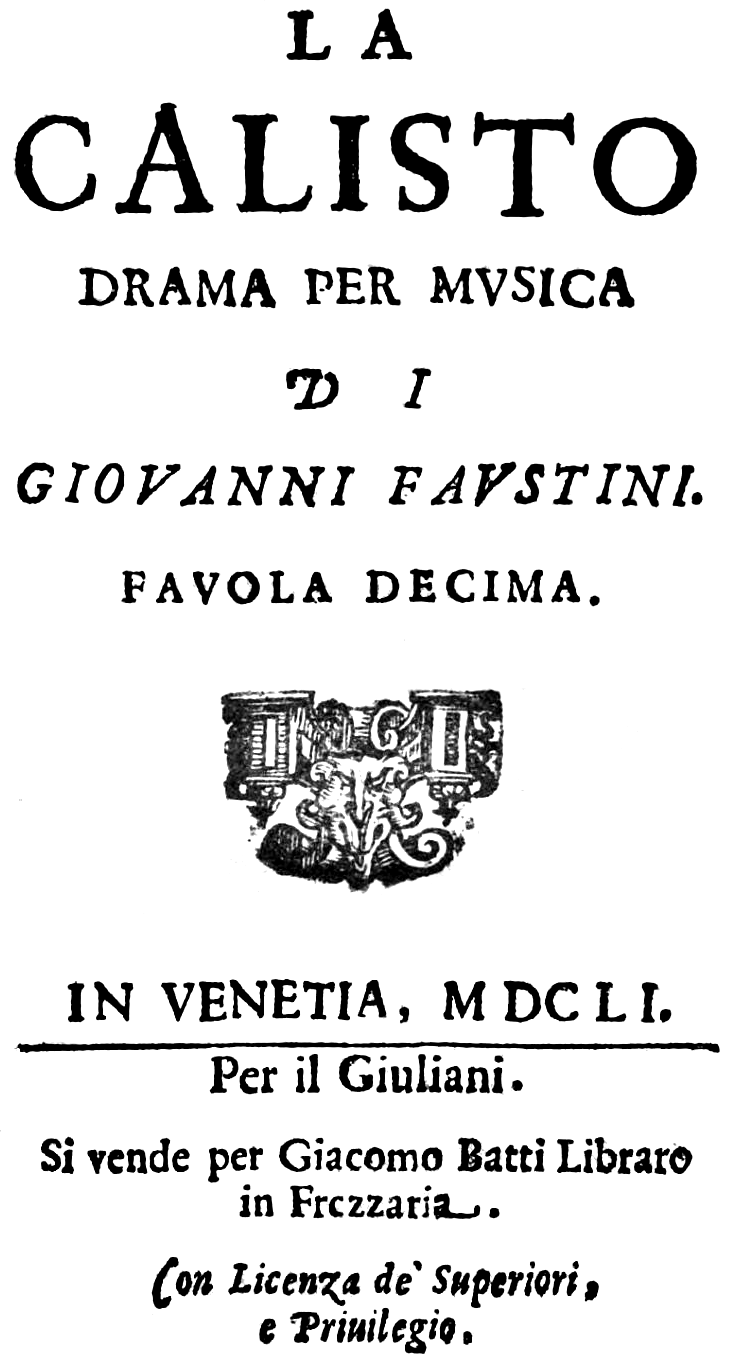
- Title page of the 1651 libretto
- Librettist: Giovanni Faustini
- Language: Italian
- Based on: the mythological story of Callisto
- Premiere: 28 November 1651; Teatro Sant'Apollinare, Venice

La Calisto is an Italian opera by Francesco Cavalli from a libretto by Giovanni Faustini based on the mythological story of Callisto.

The opera received its first performance on 28 November 1651 at the Teatro Sant'Apollinare, Venice, where it drew limited audiences for its run of eleven performances. In the twentieth century it was successfully revived.

== Libretto ==
The libretto was published in 1651 by Giuliani and Batti. The story combines two myths: Jupiter's seduction of Calisto, and Diana's adventure with Endymion. The plot is somewhat formulaic: Jane Glover has commented on how the librettist had to invent complications to meet audience expectations in the context of Venetian opera.

== Performance history ==
Faustini, who was an impresario as well as a librettist, rented the Sant'Apollinare Theatre in 1650. He and Cavalli put on three operas there before his death in December 1651 during the run of La Calisto. The theatre was equipped with complex stage machinery intended to impress the opera audiences with spectacle. However, the eleven performances of La Calisto from 28 November to 31 December 1651 attracted only about 1,200 patrons to a theatre that housed 400.

The original Venetian production suffered from many incidents, including the death of the primo uomo Bonifatio Ceretti shortly after the premiere. This forced major changes in the original cast: the role of Endimione was changed from alto to soprano and probably assigned to one of the Caresana brothers; this forced to find a new singer to perform Linfea, probably assigned to a young woman referred to as "putella" (i.e. young girl). The two soprano Furie were replaced by a single bass Furia, most likely performed by Pallegrino Canner, and a new character was added, a drunken peasant called Bifolco, probably performed by a new singer, Lorenzo Ferri, whose part has not survived in the score. Most likely, the title role Calisto was sung by Catterina Giani, whose boat was paid for by the impresario during rehearsals and the opera run, while the other prima donna, Margarita da Costa, played the role of Diana. It is also quite likely that the roles of both Giove and Giove-in-Diana were performed by the same singer, Giulio Cesare Donati, who was able to perform both bass and soprano with a technique known as basso alla bastarda (see Roles below).

The manuscript score is preserved in the Biblioteca Marciana, Venice, with other operas by Cavalli. This has allowed La Calisto to be revived in modern times. The first person to publish the score was the British conductor Raymond Leppard in 1975. Leppard had arranged the opera for performance at Glyndebourne Festival Opera in 1970. This production included a number of then-prominent singers including Janet Baker as Diana. It was significant for creating new audiences for baroque opera and the recorded version is still listened to (it has been released on compact disc). However, the way that Leppard had "realised" (as he termed his orchestrations) the opera was removed from the original work.

The United States premiere of the opera was presented in April 1972 for the dedication of the Patricia Corbett Pavilion at the University of Cincinnati – College-Conservatory of Music. The cast included Barbara Daniels as Diana and Tom Fox as Giove. It was performed in London by the Opera Factory at the Royal Court Theatre in June 1984 with the harpsichordist, Paul Daniel, conducting a group of nine players of baroque instruments.

The opera continues to be performed in new venues. For example, it received its premiere at Madrid's Teatro Real in 2019, while in the season 19-20 it was performed in Aachen and Nürnberg. It was performed with success at La Scala in 2021 in a production by David McVicar. The conductor was Christophe Rousset, who combined the players of his baroque music ensemble Les Talens Lyriques with members of the La Scala orchestra to fill the large hall. The singers included Chen Reiss as Calisto, Luca Tittoto as Jupiter, Véronique Gens as Juno, Olga Bezsmertna as Diana, Christophe Dumaux as Endymion, Chiara Amarù as Linfea and Markus Werba as Mercury.

== Publication ==
=== Leppard ===
Raymond Leppard's edition of 1975 was the first publication of the score. It includes translations of the libretto.

=== Brown ===
In 2008, Jennifer Williams Brown's edition of the score (A-R Editions, 2007) won the American Musicological Society's Claude V. Palisca award (recognizing outstanding scholarly editions or translations).

=== Torrente and Badolato ===
The German music publisher Bärenreiter Verlag initiated the publication of The Operas of Francesco Cavalli in 2012 with the publication of a new critical edition prepared by Álvaro Torrente and Nicola Badolato that was used in the new productions of the opera in the Bayerische Staatsoper (2005), the Royal Opera House (2008), Theater Basel (2010) and Teatro Real (2019).

== Roles ==
Role	Voice type	Premiere Cast, November 28, 1651 (Conductor: Francesco Cavalli)	Alternative Cast proposed by A. Torrente
La Natura	alto castrato	Tomaso Bovi	Tomaso Bovi
L'Eternità	soprano	Margarita da Costa	Nina dal Pavon
Il Destino	boy soprano	Cristoforo Caresana	Margarita da Costa
Calisto	soprano	Margarita da Costa	Catterina Giani
Giove	bass	Giulio Cesare Donati	Giulio Cesare Donati
Giove in Diana	soprano or bass	Catterina Giani	Giulio Cesare Donati
Diana	soprano	Catterina Giani	Margarita da Costa
Endimione	alto castrato	Bonifatio Ceretti	Cristoforo Caresana
Giunone	soprano	Nina dal Pavon	Nina dal Pavon
Linfea	soprano castrato	Andrea Caresana	Putella (Antonia Bembo?)
Satirino	boy soprano	Cristoforo Caresana	Andrea Caresana
Mercurio	tenor	Tenor di Carrara [sic]	Tenor di Carrara (Francesco Guerra?)
Pane	alto castrato	Tomaso Bovi	Tomaso Bovi
Silvano	bass	Pellegrino Canner	Pellegrino Canner
Furia 1	soprano castrato	Andrea Caresana	
Furia 2	boy soprano	Cristoforo Caresana	
Furia	bass		Pellegrino Canner

== Synopsis ==
The story is based on the myth of Callisto from Ovid's Metamorphoses.

== Recordings ==
- Soloists including Janet Baker, James Bowman and Ileana Cotrubaș, Glyndebourne Festival Chorus, LPO, Raymond Leppard (Decca, 1971)
- Concerto Vocale, René Jacobs, Marcelo Lippi, Maria Bayo, etc. (Harmonia Mundi, 1996)
- Glimmerglass Opera, Jane Glover (BBC Music, 1996) - extracts from a live performance
