= Francesco Cavalli =

Italian composer (1602–1676)

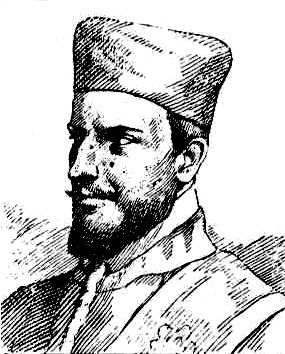
Imaginary portrait of Francesco Cavalli

Francesco Cavalli (born Pietro Francesco Caletti-Bruni; 14 February 1602 – 14 January 1676) was a Venetian composer, organist and singer of the early Baroque period. He succeeded his teacher Claudio Monteverdi as the dominant and leading opera composer of the mid 17th-century. A central figure of Venetian musical life, Cavalli wrote more than thirty operas, almost all of which premiered in the city's theaters. His best known works include Ormindo (1644), Giasone (1649) and La Calisto (1651).

== Life ==
Cavalli was born at Crema, then an inland province of the Venetian Republic. He became a singer (boy soprano) at St Mark's Basilica in Venice in 1616, where he had the opportunity to work under the tutorship of Claudio Monteverdi. He became second organist in 1639, first organist in 1665, and in 1668 maestro di cappella. He took the name "Cavalli" from his patron, Venetian nobleman Federico Cavalli. Though he wrote prolifically for the church, he is chiefly remembered for his operas. He began to write for the stage in 1639 (Le nozze di Teti e di Peleo) soon after the first public opera house opened in Venice, the Teatro San Cassiano. He established so great a reputation that he was summoned to Paris from 1660 (when he revived his opera Xerse) until 1662, producing his Ercole amante. He died in Venice at the age of 73.

== Music and influence ==
Cavalli was the most influential composer in the rising genre of public opera in mid-17th-century Venice. Unlike Monteverdi's early operas, scored for the extravagant court orchestra of Mantua, Cavalli's operas make use of a small orchestra of strings and basso continuo to meet the limitations of public opera houses.

Cavalli introduced melodious arias into his music and popular types into his libretti. His operas have a remarkably strong sense of dramatic effect as well as a great musical facility, and a grotesque humour which was characteristic of Italian opera down to the death of Alessandro Scarlatti. Cavalli's operas provide the only example of a continuous musical development of a single composer in a single genre from the early to the late 17th century in Venice — only a few operas by others (e.g., Monteverdi and Antonio Cesti) survive. The development is particularly interesting to scholars because opera was still quite a new medium when Cavalli began working, and had matured into a popular public spectacle by the end of his career.

More than forty-two operas have been attributed to Cavalli. Manuscript scores of twenty-six are extant, preserved in the Biblioteca Nazionale Marciana (Library of St Mark) in Venice. Scores of some of the operas also exist in other locations. In addition, the music of his two last operas (Coriolano and Masenzio), which are clearly attributed to him, is lost. Another twelve or so for which the music is lost have also been attributed to him, but these attributions have either been disproved or remain uncertain. Cristoforo Ivanovich, who published the first chronicle of Venetian opera, Minerva al tavolino (Venice, 1681), attributed most of the anonymous works from the first 15 years of public performances in Venice to Cavalli, and many of these attributions were repeated by subsequent authors. The American musicologist Thomas Walker, writing in The New Grove Dictionary of Opera, considered seven of Ivanovich's attributions and another two by other authors as doubtful.

In addition to operas, Cavalli wrote settings of the Magnificat in the grand Venetian polychoral style, settings of the Marian antiphons, other sacred music in a more conservative manner – notably a Requiem Mass in eight parts (SSAATTBB), probably intended for his own funeral – and some instrumental music.

=== Modern performances ===
Cavalli's music was revived in the twentieth century. The Glyndebourne Opera production of La Calisto, in 1970, is an example. More recently, Hipermestra was performed at Glyndebourne in 2017. The discography is extensive and Cavalli has featured in BBC Radio 3's Composer of the Week series.

== Operas ==
Attributions to Cavalli considered doubtful by American musicologist Thomas Walker are indicated in the notes.

Title	Libretto	Première date	Place, theatre	Notes
Le nozze di Teti e di Peleo	Orazio Persiani	24 January 1639	Venice, Teatro San Cassiano	
Gli amori d'Apollo e di Dafne	Giovanni Francesco Busenello	1640	Venice, Teatro San Cassiano	
La Didone	Giovanni Francesco Busenello	1641	Venice, Teatro San Cassiano	
L'amore innamorato	Giovanni Battista Fusconi	1 January 1642	Venice, Teatro San Moisè	
Narciso et Ecco immortalati	Orazio Persiani	30 January 1642	Venice, Teatro Santi Giovanni e Paolo	music lost, doubtful
La virtù de' strali d'Amore	Giovanni Faustini	1642	Venice, Teatro San Cassiano	
L'Egisto	Giovanni Faustini	autumn 1643	Venice, Teatro San Cassiano	
La Deidamia	Scipione Herrico	5 January 1644	Venice, Teatro Novissimo	music lost, doubtful
L'Ormindo	Giovanni Faustini	1644	Venice, Teatro San Cassiano	
Il Romolo e 'l Remo	Giulio Strozzi	1645	Venice, Teatro Santi Giovanni e Paolo	music lost, doubtful
La Doriclea	Giovanni Faustini	1645	Venice, Teatro San Cassiano	
Il Titone	Giovanni Faustini	1645	Venice, Teatro San Cassiano	music lost
La prosperità infelice di Giulio Cesare dittatore	Giovanni Francesco Busenello	1646	Venice, Teatro Santi Giovanni e Paolo	music lost, doubtful
La Torilda	Pietro Paolo Bissari	1648	Venice, Teatro Santi Giovanni e Paolo	music lost, doubtful
Il Giasone	Giacinto Andrea Cicognini	5 January 1649	Venice, Teatro San Cassiano	
L'Euripo	Giovanni Faustini	1649	Venice, Teatro San Moise	music lost
L'Orimonte	Nicolò Minato	20 February 1650	Venice, Teatro San Cassiano	
La Bradamante	Pietro Paolo Bissari	1650	Venice, Teatro Santi Giovanni e Paolo	music lost, doubtful
L'Armidoro	Bortolo Castoreo	20 January 1651	Venice, Teatro San Cassiano	music lost, doubtful
L'Oristeo	Giovanni Faustini	9 February 1651	Venice, Teatro Sant'Apollinare	
La Rosinda	Giovanni Faustini	1651	Venice, Teatro Sant'Apollinare	also known as Le magie amorose
La Calisto	Giovanni Faustini	28 November 1651	Venice, Teatro Sant'Apollinare	
L'Eritrea	Giovanni Faustini	17 January 1652	Venice, Teatro Sant'Apollinare	
La Veremonda, l'amazzone di Aragona	Giacinto Andrea Cicognini and Giulio Strozzi	21 December 1652	Naples, Nuovo Teatro del Palazzo Reale	also known as Il Delio
L'Helena rapita da Theseo	Giacomo Badoaro?	1653	Venice, Teatro Santi Giovanni e Paolo	music lost, doubtful
L'Orione	Francesco Melosio	June 1653	Milan, Teatro Real	
Il Ciro	Giulio Cesare Sorrentino	30 January 1654	Venice, Teatro Santi Giovanni e Paolo	in collaboration with Francesco Provenzale
Il Xerse	Nicolò Minato	12 January 1655	Venice, Teatro Santi Giovanni e Paolo	
L'Erismena	Aurelio Aureli	30 December 1655	Venice, Teatro Sant'Apollinare	
Statira principessa di Persia	Giovanni Francesco Busenello	18 January 1656	Venice, Teatro Santi Giovanni e Paolo	
L'Artemisia	Nicolò Minato	10 January 1657	Venice, Teatro Santi Giovanni e Paolo	
L'Hipermestra	Giovanni Andrea Moniglia	12 June 1658	Florence, Teatro degli Immobili	
L'Antioco	Nicolò Minato	12 January 1659	Venice, Teatro San Cassiano	music lost
Elena	Giovanni Faustini and Nicolò Minato	26 December 1659	Venice, Teatro San Cassiano	also known as Il rapimento d'Helena
La pazzia in trono, ossia il Caligola delirante	Domenico Gisberti	1660	Venice, Teatro Sant'Apollinare	music lost, doubtful
Ercole amante	Francesco Buti	7 February 1662	Paris, at the Salle des Machines in the Tuileries Palace	Ballet music by Jean-Baptiste Lully
Scipione affricano	Nicolò Minato	9 February 1664	Venice, Teatro Santi Giovanni e Paolo	
Muzio Scevola	Nicolò Minato	26 January 1665	Venice, Teatro San Salvatore	
Pompeo Magno	Nicolò Minato	20 February 1666	Venice, Teatro San Salvatore	
Eliogabalo	Aurelio Aureli	November 1999	Crema, Teatro San Domenico	composed 1667 for Venice, Teatro Santi Giovanni e Paolo (unperformed)
Coriolano	Cristoforo Ivanovich	27 May 1669	Piacenza, Teatro Ducale	music lost
Masenzio	Giacomo Francesco Bussani	composed 1673		unperformed and music lost

== Sacred works ==
- Musiche sacre concernenti messa, e salmi concertati con istromenti, imni, antifone et sonate (Venecia, 1656).
- Messa, 8vv, 2 vn, vc, otros instrumentos ad libitum ed. R. Leppard (Londres, 1966).
- Alma redemptoris mater, 2 S, A, T, B, ed. B. Stäblein, Musica divina, iv (Regensburg, 1950).
- Ave maris stella, A, T, B.
- Ave regina caelorum, T, B, ed. B. Stäblein, Musica divina, i (Regensburg, 1950).
- Beatus vir, A, T, B, 2 vn, vc.
- Confitebor tibi Domine, 8vv, 2 vn, vc
- Credidi, 2 S, A, T, B, 2 vn, vc
- Deus tuorum militum, A, T, B, 2 vn, vc
- Dixit Dominus, 8vv, 2 vn, vc, other insts ad lib
- Domine probasti, S, A, B, 2 vn, vc
- Exultet orbis, 4vv, 2 vn, vc
- In convertendo, 2 S, A, T, B
- Iste confessor, 2 S, 2 vn, vc
- Jesu corona virginum, A, T, B, 2 vn, vc
- Laetatus sum, A, T, B, 2 vn, 3 va, ed. R. Leppard (London, 1969)
- Lauda Jerusalem, 8vv, 2 vn, vc, other insts ad lib
- Laudate Dominum, 8vv, 2 vn, vc, ed. R. Leppard (London, 1969)
- Laudate pueri, 2 S, A, T, B, 2 vn, vc
- Magnificat, 8vv, 2 vn, vc, other insts ad lib, ed. R. Leppard (London, 1969)
- Nisi Dominus, 4vv, 2 vn, vc
- Regina caeli, A, T, B, ed. B. Stäblein, Musica divina, ii (Regensburg, 1950)
- Salve regina, A, 2 T, B, ed. B. Stäblein, Musica divina, iii (Regensburg, 1950)
- Canzoni [sonate] a 3, 4, 6, 8, 10, 12; a 6 y a 12 ed. R. Nielsen (Bologna, 1955)
- Vesperi, 8vv, bc (Venice, 1675)
- Vespero della B.V. Maria: Dixit Dominus; Laudate pueri; Laetatus sum; Nisi Dominus; Lauda Jerusalem; Magnificat. ed. G. Piccioli (Milan, 1960); ed. F. Bussi (Milan, 1995)
- Vespero delle domeniche: Dixit Dominus; Confitebor; Beatus vir; Laudate pueri; In exitu Israel; Laudate Dominum; Credidi; In convertendo; Domine probasti; Beati omnes; De profundis; Memento; Confitebor angelorum; Magnificat, ed. G. Piccioli (Milan, 1960); all ed. F. Bussi (Milan, 1995)
- Vespero delle cinque Laudate ad uso della cappella di S Marco: Laudate pueri; Laudate Dominum laudate eum; Lauda anima mea; Laudate Dominum quoniam bonus; Lauda Jerusalem; Magnificat, ed. G. Piccioli (Milan, 1960); all ed. F. Bussi (Milan, 1995)
- Cantate Domino, 1v, bc, 16252; ed. F. Vatielli, Antiche cantate spirituali (Turin, 1922)
- O quam suavis, 1v, bc, 16453
- Magnificat, 6vv, 2 vn, bc, 16505; ed. F. Bussi (Milan, 1988)
- In virtute tua, 3vv, bc, 16561
- O bone Jesu, 2vv, bc, 16561
- Plaudite, cantate, 3vv, bc, 16561
- Missa pro defunctis [Requiem], 8vv, bc, D-Bsb, Dlb; ed. F. Bussi (Milan, 1978)

== See also ==
- Music of Venice
