= Teatro Sant'Apollinare =

Coordinates: 45.43704°N 12.33118°E

Teatro Sant'Apollinare, also known by its nickname Teatro Sant'Aponal, was an Italian public opera house established in 1651 in Venice in what is today Petriana Court. The Sant'Apollinare was established in a residential building and equipped with advanced stage machinery intended to allow for spectacular stage shows. It was managed in 1651 by impessario and librettist Giovanni Faustini, who died during the first run of his opera La Calisto there. After his death, his brother Marco Faustini took over management of the theater. It was dismantled in 1661 and the rooms returned to residential use.

== See also ==
- Venetian opera
- Teatro San Cassiano
- Giovanni Faustini
- Marco Faustini
