= Pietro Andrea Ziani =

Italian organist and composer

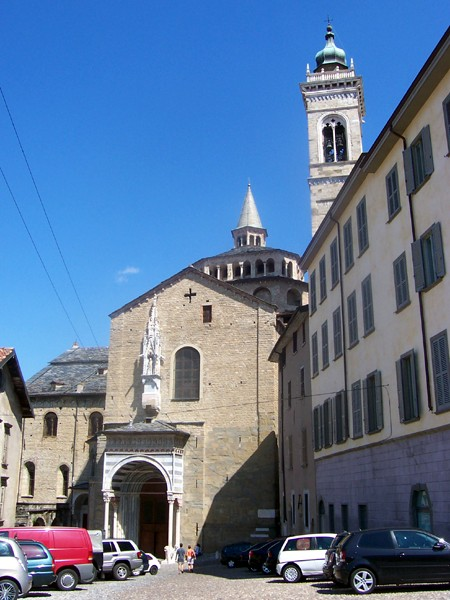
De Santa Maria Maggiore in Bergamo

Pietro Andrea Ziani (1616 in Venice – 1684 in Naples) was an Italian organist and composer. He was the uncle of Marc'Antonio Ziani. Beginning in 1669, he was the organist at St Mark's Basilica and later moved on to serve Eleonor Magdalene of Neuburg in Vienna. His works included "L'Assalone punito" (1667) and the operas "Eupatra" (1654-5), "Le fortune di Rodpoe e Damira" (1657), "L'inconstanza Trionfate" (1657-8), "Annibale in Capua" (1660), "Medea Placata" (1661-2), "Gli scherzi di Fortuna" (1661-2), "Le fatiche d'Ercole per Deianira (1661-2), "Amor Guerriero" (1662-3) "La ricreazione burlesca" (1663), "L'invidia conculcata della virtù, merito, virtù, merito, valore di Leopoldo imperatore" (1664), "Cloridea" (1665), "Doriclea" and "Alciade" (1665-6, not performed), "Circe" (1665), "L'Elice" (1666) and "La Galatea" (1667).

== Recordings ==
- "L'Assalone punito" Il Complesso Barocco, Alan Curtis. Symphonia 2001.
