= Nicolò Minato =

Venetian poet, librettist and impresario

Count Nicolò Minato (b. Bergamo, ca. 1627; d. Vienna, 28 February 1698) was a Venetian poet, librettist and impresario. His career can be divided into two parts: the years he spent at Venice, from 1650 to 1669, and the years at Vienna, from 1669 until his death.

Minato is best remembered for his vast output as a librettist for opera. In total, he wrote over 200 librettos. His career began with Orimonte, written in 1650 for Francesco Cavalli. At this time he worked primarily as a lawyer, and it was only over a decade later that he abandoned this, his first profession, and turned fully to the composition of librettos and theatre management (as did his contemporary, Giovanni Faustini. Minato was also a member of several literary academies, including, along with Busenello, the Accademia degli Imperfetti, a group that devoted itself to studying the classics and contemporary jurisprudence. He wrote 11 librettos for Venice, most of them for Cavalli, though a few were first set by Antonio Sartorio. In 1665 he became a prominent figure in the running of the Teatro San Salvador. While there he collaborated with composer Giovanni Legrenzi in revising his opera Zenobia e Radamisto in 1667. In 1669 he left Venice to take up a post in Vienna as court poet to the Emperor Leopold I.

At Vienna he wrote over 170 librettos, averaging around 5 a year, in genres as diverse as opera seria and festa teatrale. In addition to his duties as a writer of secular works, Minato was also a prolific producer of sacred texts, often described as oratorios. He largely provided these texts for performances given to mark special occasions - birthdays in the royal family, for example, or possibly Lenten celebrations or court weddings. Minato was a popular librettist and after his death his works were frequently revived by composers such as Johann Adolf Hasse, Handel, Giovanni Bononcini, and Telemann.

== Bibliography ==
- S. T. Worsthorne: Venetian Opera in the Seventeenth Century (Oxford, 1954)
- J. Glover: Cavalli (London, 1978)
- E. Rutschman: The Minato-Cavalli Operas: the search for Structure in Libretto and Solo Scene (diss., U. of Washington, 1979)
- E. Rutschman: Minato and the Venetian Opera Libretto, CMc, no.27 (1982), 84–91
- E. Rosand: Opera in Seventeenth-Century Venice: the Creation of a Genre (Berkeley, 1991)
- N. Hiltl: Die Oper am Hofe Kaiser Leopolds I. mit besonderer Berücksichtigung der Tätigkeit von Minato und Draghi (diss., U. of Vienna, 1974)
- F. Hadamowsky: Barocktheater am Wiener Kaiserhof, Jb der Geschichte für Wiener Theaterforschung 1951–2 (1955), 7–96
- L. Bianconi: Funktionen des Operntheaters in Neapel bis 1700 und die Rolle Alessandro Scarlattis, Colloquium Alessandro Scarlatti: Würzburg 1975, 13–111
