= New Chamber Opera =

UK based opera company

New Chamber Opera is a professional opera company located in Oxford, United Kingdom. It specialises in the fields of chamber opera and music theatre, and produces rarely performed works from the Baroque era to the present. It is a member of the Opera and Music Theatre Forum. New Chamber Opera has received financial support from the Arts Council of Great Britain and The National Lottery.

== History ==
New Chamber Opera was founded in 1990 by Michael Burden and Gary Cooper. Burden serves as its director. The company has staged more than thirty productions, including Handel's Orlando, Serse and Amadigi di Gaula, Cimarosa's The Secret Marriage and Mozart's The Marriage of Figaro and Il Rè pastore. The company has an associated Baroque orchestra, The Band of Instruments.

Appearances outside Oxford have included concerts and productions at the Tudeley and Southwark Festivals, several performances at London's South Bank Centre, and at the National Gallery. With its contemporary music ensemble Phoenix, it has performed several pieces of twentieth-century music theatre including Schoenberg's Pierrot Lunaire, Peter Maxwell Davies's Eight Songs for a Mad King, Vessalii Icones, Notre Dames des Fleurs, and Miss Donnithorne's Maggot, and Harrison Birtwistle's Down by the Greenwood Side.

New Chamber Opera has frequently recovered and performed lesser known works, particularly those of the 17th, 18th, and early 19th centuries. To this end its members have prepared new editions and commissioned new translations. In 2008 and 2009, New Chamber Opera took part in a national fundraising campaign led by the Bodleian Library, Oxford, to prevent the only known manuscript of the English version of Francesco Cavalli's opera, Erismena, from being exported to the United States. New Chamber Opera subsequently staged the opera using a new edition by Michael Burden, and toured the production to the Opera at West Green House.

Its music director is Steven Devine.

== Activities ==
The cast of Paisiello's "Il Barbiere di Siviglia", 2017

The focus of the company's professional activities is the Summer Opera, an annual garden staging in the Warden's Garden at New College, and accompanied by The Band of Instruments. The garden, a natural theatrical space surrounded by stone walls with an 18th-century stone summer house, is located between Queen's Lane and All Souls College.

== The Band of Instruments ==
The Band of Instruments, founded by Michael Burden and Gary Cooper in 1995, first performed with the Choir of New College, Oxford. The Band's leader is Caroline Balding. The Band occasionally performs as an independent ensemble, and always accompanies the Summer Opera.

The Band of Instruments have also recorded the cycle of the four seasons concertos by the Italian composer Giovanni Antonio Guido, Scherzi armonici sopra le quattro stagioni dell’anno (‘Harmonics above the four seasons of the year’). Guido, who was serving as maître de la musique for the Duke of Orléans, had been living and working in France from about 1703. KLassik.com commented that ‘Caroline Balding, Matthew Truscott and Sarah Moffatt play perfectly synchronized in timbre and expression’, while CD Classico Italy described it as ‘a fine and authentic execution by the violinist Caroline Balding’.

== Recordings ==
New Chamber Opera's recordings have mostly appeared on the Gaudeamus label, with Academy Sound and Vision. These include music by Purcell from the Gresham Manuscript, and Music for Ceremonial Oxford. It has frequently recorded French Baroque music, recording stage music from Charpentier's output, and the only complete recording of Rameau's cantatas.

== New Chamber Opera Studio ==
The company also operates the New Chamber Opera Studio, which stages two student productions annually and a recital series of twenty-four concerts in which they take part. Recent productions have included Orpheus in the Underworld, by Offenbach, in 2012 and La Calisto, by Francesco Cavalli, in 2014

In 2016, the company gave the world premiere of "Rothschild's Violin" by Marco Galvani in the antechapel of Oxford's New College.

The members of New Chamber Opera Studio also prepare or organise the live content of the university's visiting chairs of opera. The visiting professors have included Thomas Allen, Graham Vick, John Eliot Gardiner, Renée Fleming, Jane Glover, and Katie Mitchell.

New Chamber Opera also part-funds two Repetiteur Scholarships every three years to St Catherine's College, Oxford, or to a scholar from another college. The senior scholar serves as the Studio's director. The award has recently been held by:

- Marcus McDevitt (current holder)
- Rudyard Cook (current holder)
- Alessandro MacKinnon-Botti
- Luke Mitchell
- James Andrews
- Toby Stanford
- Joseph Beesley
- Anhad Arora
- Chloe Rooke https://www.chloerooke.com/
- Naomi Orrell
- Michael Pandya https://www.michaelpandya.com/
- Edmund Whitehead https://www.edmundwhitehead.com/
- Harry Sever https://www.harrysever.com/
- Benjamin Holder http://benjaminholdermusic.com/
- Jonathon Swinard https://www.jonathonswinard.com/
- Alice Newton

== Productions ==
This list of productions follows the information in the company's website.

=== New Chamber Opera ===
- Le Pescatrici (The Fisher Girls) Haydn, 2026 (forthcoming)
- The School of Jealousy (La scuola de' gelosi) Salieri, 2025
- La vera costanza, Haydn, 2024
- The Telephone, Menotti, 2023 Performed at the British Ambassador's Residence, the Villa Wolkonsky, Rome
- La Frascatana, Paisiello, 2023 (with a new translation by Simon Rees)
- A Coffin, a Confession, and a Cautionary Tale; three pieces of music theatre: Last Things by Alasdair Nicolson, The Organist's Confession by Luke Smith, and The Evils of Tobacco by Samuel Hogarth. Performed at the Tête à Tête Festival at the Cockpit Theatre, London, 2022
- Le Astuzie Femminili, Cimarosa, 2022 (with a new translation by Simon Rees)
- La Diavolessa, Galuppi, 2021 (with a new translation by Simon Rees)
- The COVID Year
- The Apothecary, Haydn, 2019 (new version by Michael Burden and Luke Lewis and a new translation by Simon Rees). Performed at the British Ambassador's Residence, the Hôtel de Charost, Paris
- Il pastor fido, Handel, 2019 (with a new translation by Simon Rees)
- Il mondo della luna, Haydn, 2018 (new version by Michael Burden and Luke Lewis and a new translation by Simon Rees)
- Il barbiere di Siviglia, Paisiello, 2017
- The Parisian Painter, Cimarosa, 2016 (new edition by Michael Burden and Luke Lewis and a new translation by Simon Rees)
- La Locandiera, Salieri, 2015
- L'infedeltà delusa, Haydn, 2014
- Tamerlano, Handel, 2013
- Il re pastore, Mozart, 2012
- Falstaff, Antonio Salieri, 2011
- Erismena, Cavalli, 2010 (new edition by Michael Burden, and on tour to the Opera at West Green House
- Il mondo alla roversa, Baldassare Galuppi, 2009 (newly commissioned translation by Simon Rees and edition by Michael Burden)
- Don't Go Down the Elephant After Midnight, Andrew Gant, 2008 (World premiere, Tête-à-Tête Opera Festival at the Hammersmith Studios)
- Artaxerxes, Thomas Arne, 2008
- Serse, Handel, 2007 (revival)
- La canterina, Haydn, 2006
- Le comte Ory, Rossini, 2006
- La finta semplice, Mozart, 2005 (newly commissioned translation by Simon Rees, and edition by Michael Burden)
- The Medium, Peter Maxwell Davies, 2005 (performed for Maxwell Davies's election as an Honorary Doctor of Music by the University of Oxford)
- Il Trespolo tutore, Alessandro Stradella, 2004 (newly commissioned translation by Simon Rees, and edition by Michael Burden)
- La finta giardiniera, Mozart, 2003
- Dido and Aeneas, Purcell, 2002 (new production)
- The Bear, William Walton, 2002 (to mark the Walton Centenary)
- Amadigi, Handel, 2001
- The Marriage of Figaro, Mozart, 2000
- The Turn of the Screw, Britten, 1999
- Serse, Handel, 1998
- Così fan tutte, Mozart, 1997
- The Secret Marriage, Domenico Cimarosa, 1996 (new production)
- Orlando, Handel, 1995 (revival)
- Dido and Aeneas, Purcell, 1995 (new production, and on tour to the Tudeley Festival)
- Orlando, Handel, 1994
- Lo frate 'nnamorato, Pergolesi, 1993
- The Secret Marriage, Domenico Cimarosa, 1991
- Dido and Aeneas, Purcell, 1990

=== New Chamber Opera Studio ===
- Erismena, Cavalli, 2026 (forthcoming)
- Thomas and Sally, Thomas Arne, 2025
- Falstaff, Antonio Salieri, 2025
- Venus and Adonis, Pepusch, 2025
- King Arthur: Scenes from a Life, Henry Purcell, 2024
- Acteon, Marc-Antoine Charpentier, 2023
- Trouble in Tahiti, Leonard Bernstein, 2023
- The Death of Dido, Pepusch, 2023
- Venus and Adonis, Blow, 2022
- COVID 2019
- Aci, Galatea e Polifemo, Handel, 2020
- La vera costanza, Haydn, 2020
- The secret marriage, Cimarosa, 2019
- Xerxes, Handel, 2019
- Lo speziale, Haydn, 2018
- The Rake's Progress, Stravinsky, 2018
- Acis and Galatea, Handel, 2017
- Renard, Stravinsky, 2017
- The Bear, William Walton, 2017
- Dido and Aeneas, Purcell, 2016
- Rothschild's Violin, Galvani, 2016 (World premiere)
- Pimpinone, Albinoni, 2015
- La Calisto, Cavalli, 2014
- Galileo Galilei, Philip Glass, 2013
- Orpheus in the Underworld, Offenbach, 2012
- Acis and Galatea, Handel, 2011
- The Barber of Seville, Rossini, 2011
- The Medium, Menotti, 2010
- Orpheus & Euridice, Gluck, 2009
- David and Goliath, Samuel Hogarth, 2008 (World premiere, semi-staged)
- Venus and Adonis, John Blow, 2005 (Opera workshop with John Eliot Gardiner)
- Dido and Aeneas, Purcell, 2004 (Opera workshop with John Eliot Gardiner)
- The Story of Orpheus, John Caldwell, 2004 (World premiere)
- Thomas and Sally, Thomas Arne, 2003 (at the theatre at Buscot Park)
- Renard, Stravinsky, 2002
- Il signor Bruschino, Rossini, 2001
- Orlando, Handel, 2000
- Bastien und Bastienne, Mozart, 1999
- Curlew River, Britten, 1998 (new production)
- Masque of Alfred, Thomas Arne, 1998
- King Arthur, Purcell, 1998
- Il maestro di musica, Pergolesi, 1997
- La serva padrona, Pergolesi, 1997
- The Man Who Mistook His wife for a Hat, Michael Nyman, 1996
- Le Nozze di Cherubino, Giles Swayne, 1996
- Down by the Greenwood Side, Harrison Birtwistle, 1995
- The Beggar's Opera, John Gay, 1995
- Eight Songs for a Mad King, Peter Maxwell Davies, 1994
- Facade, William Walton, 1994
- The Four Note Opera, Tom Johnson, 1994 (revival)
- The Impresario, Mozart, 1994
- Miss Donnithorne's Maggot, Peter Maxwell Davies, 1994
- Pierrot Lunaire, Schoenberg, 1994
- La canterina, Haydn, 1993
- The Prodigal Son, Benjamin Britten, 1993
- The Burning Fiery Furnace, Britten, 1992
- The Four Note Opera, Tom Johnson, 1991
- A Hand of Bridge, Samuel Barber, 1991
- The Telephone, Giancarlo Menotti, 1991
- Pimpinone, Telemann, 1991
- Curlew River, Britten, 1991

== Recordings ==
- Purcell Anthems, music by Henry Purcell, 1995, CRD with the Choir of New College, Oxford
- The Music to Le mariage forcé and Les Fous divertissants, music by Marc-Antione Charpentier, 1996, ASV
- Songs and Music from the Gresham Autograph, music by Henry Purcell, 1999, ASV
- Rameau: Collected Cantatas, music by Jean-Philippe Rameau, 1999, ASV CDGAU632 (reviewed in the New York Times)
- Music from Ceremonial Oxford, music by Richard Goodson, Matthew Locke, Sampson Eastwick, John Blow, Henry Aldrich, 2001, ASV CDGAU222
- Andromède and Le ballet de Polieucte, music by Marc-Antoine Charpentier, 2002, ASV CDGAU303
- Vivaldi Cantatas: music by Antonio Vivaldi, 2004, ASV CDGAU339
- Guido The Four Seasons: music by Giovanni Antonio Guido, 2013, Divine Art B00AQZU9XW
