= Moro per amore =

1681 opera by Alessandro Stradella

Title page of 1696 libretto

Moro per amore ("Moor/Die for love") is a 1681 opera in three acts with music by Alessandro Stradella set to a libretto by Flavio Orsini last duke of Bracciano, who is credited on the title page with the anagram Filosinavoro. The opera was scheduled for Genoa's Teatro del Falcone in 1681, but was not given a public performance until 1695, more than thirteen years after the composer's death.

== Roles ==
- Eurinda, Queen of Sicily (soprano)
- Princess Lucinda, first lady of the court (soprano)
- Lindora, nurse (alto)
- Rodrigo, counsellor (bass)
- Floridoro, under the name of Feraspe, a feigned Moor (alto)
- Fiorino, his page (soprano)
- Filandro, Ambassador of the King of Naples (tenor)
- Royal guards, pages, silent characters to accompany the Queen, guards at will

== Synopsis ==
=== Act 1 ===
After her father's death, Eurinda becomes Queen of Sicily. The nurse Lindora and the chancellor Rodrigo try to persuade her to marry. The envoy Filandro tries in vain to convince his master, the King of Naples, to become the groom. Floridoro, son of the King of Cyprus, hears of Eurinda's beauty and falls in love with her; however, the royal houses of Sicily and Cyprus are enemies, so he travels to Eurinda's court disguised as a Moor under the name Feraspe, as a servant of Filandro. In order to gain the nurse's favor, Floridoro flirts with her, and is observed by Eurinda, who asks Filandro for his services for her own sake.

=== Act 2 ===
In the second act, Eurinda falls in love with Floridoro, but pushes her feelings aside because of the different status of queen and Moor. Floridoro's servant Fiorino falls in love with Lindora. Lucinda, a princess at court, also falls in love with Floridoro. The ambassador Filandro falls in love with Lucinda. Lucinda, out of disappointment and jealousy, does not grant Eurinda her happiness and gives the Moor Floridoro a supposed letter from the queen to her chancellor, who is now waiting in a distant camp for the enemy Cypriot fleet to approach. Floridoro thus leaves the queen.

=== Act 3 ===
The third act begins with Rodrigo's announcement that Floridoro has been captured by pirates. The three women lament their loss. Lindora soon consoles herself with Fiorino. The pirates, however, recognize Floridoro as the king's son and he returns to Sicily, undisguised, at the head of his army, and three happy couples emerge.

== Recordings ==
- 1992: Moro per amore, Alessandro Stradella Consort (ensemble), Estevan Velardi (conductor). Soloists: Riccardo Ristori (Rodrigo), Roberta Invernizzi (Eurinda), Silvia Piccollo (Lucinda), Marco Lazzara (Lindora), Valeria Matacchini (Floridoro), Maria Grazia Liguori (Fiorino), Marco Beasley (Filandro). 3 CDs: Bongiovanni
