= Illness and death of Georges Pompidou =

Illness and death of the 19th President of France

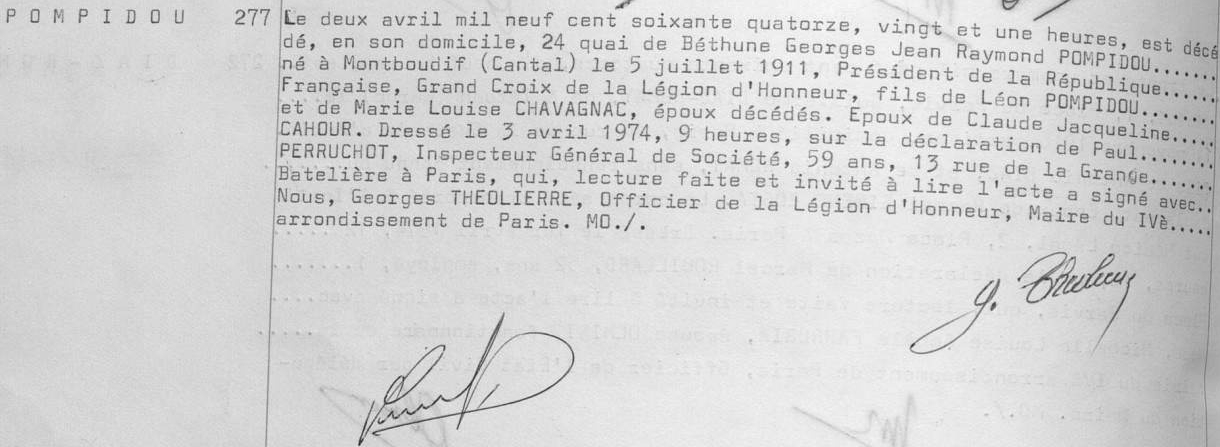
- Pompidou's death certificate
- Date: 2 April 1974 (death); 5 April 1974 (state funeral)
- Location: Hôtel Hesselin, 4th arrondissement of Paris (death); Notre-Dame de Paris, 4th arrondissement of Paris (state funeral)

Georges Pompidou, the 19th president of France, died on 2 April 1974 at the age of 62, after having suffered from Waldenström macroglobulinemia, a form of blood cancer, for several years. He was the fourth French president to die in office, and the first in the history of the Fifth Republic.

A former prime minister during the presidency of Charles de Gaulle, Pompidou contested the 1969 presidential election, triggered after de Gaulle resigned; at the age of 57, he was elected to a seven-year term in the second round, defeating the acting president, Alain Poher. Prior to his death, the secrecy of Pompidou's health issues led to rumors considering his possible resignation and the severity of his illness. He was buried in the Yvelines village of Orvilliers following a state funeral at Notre-Dame de Paris. His death triggered the 1974 presidential election, with Poher again serving as acting president.

== Illness ==
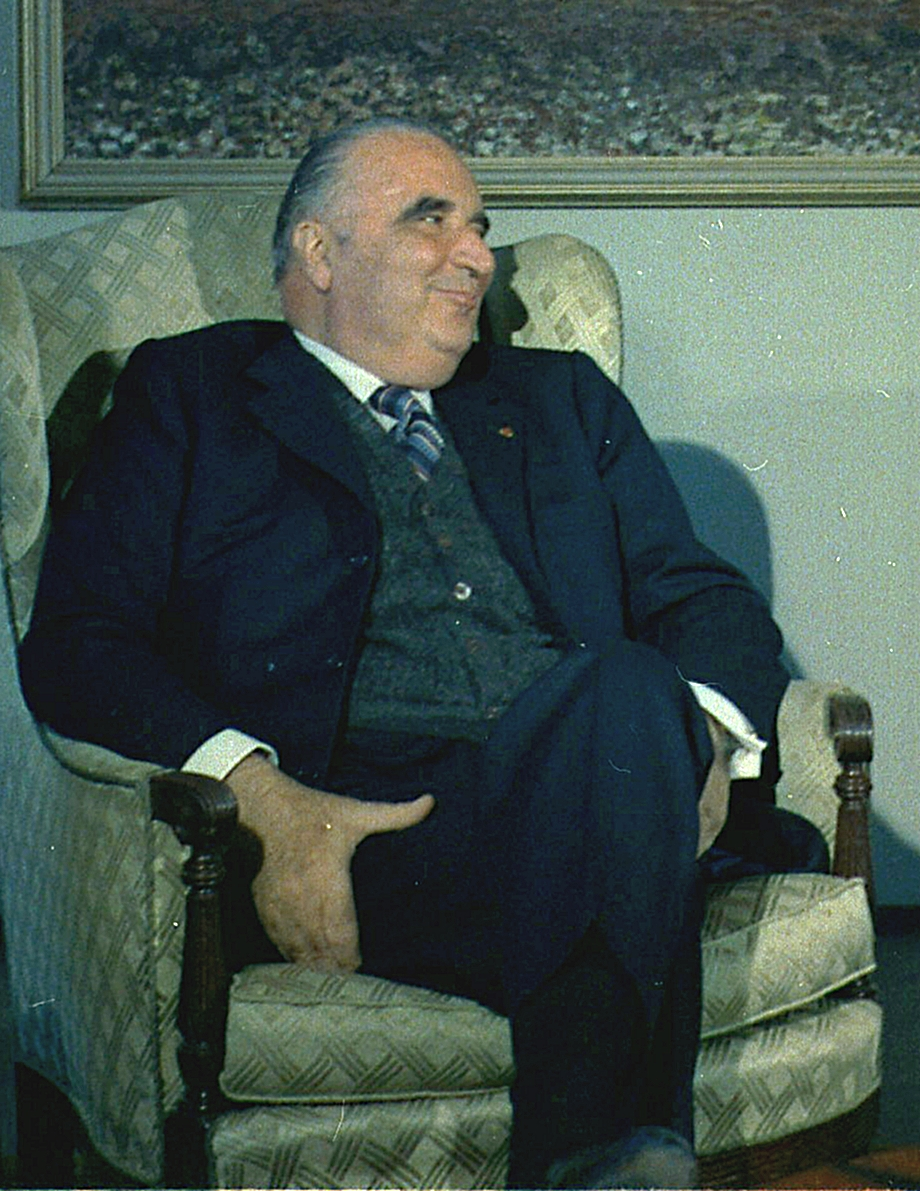
Pompidou in 1973, the year before his death

According to physician Jean Bernard, Pompidou had suffered from Waldenström macroglobulinemia since 1968, and was likely aware of it when he was elected. Bernard assessed that if the president had resigned, his disease would not have progressed so rapidly. According to the Central Intelligence Agency (CIA), Pompidou's disease was only diagnosed in the summer of 1971, but the CIA was unaware of its nature until at least 1972, and was said to have taken a urinalysis of the French president during his trip to Iceland in June 1973 to further investigate his illness.

Pompidou's illness and treatment, particularly corticosteroids, made his face extremely swollen, increased his weight and slowed his gait. He devoted himself mainly to foreign policy and increasingly delegated his remaining powers to his secretary-general, Édouard Balladur. Balladur later recalled Pompidou advising him in 1973 "to take care of everything and only take on the most important problems". Pompidou no longer went to the Élysée Palace except for essential duties, preferring to stay and work at home.

Optimistic press releases did not prevent the fueling of rumors about the seriousness of Pompidou's illness or of his possible resignation. During a press conference, Pompidou even hinted at a possible candidacy for a second term in the presidential election scheduled for 1976. For the first time under the Fifth Republic, an official public communiqué, signed on 7 February 1974 by his personal physician, Jean Vignalou, provided information on the president's health. Another press release dated 21 March mentioned a "benign lesion of vascular origin, located in the anorectal region, and intermittently hyperalgic", his Waldenström's disease being characterized by significant hemorrhages.

By early 1974, Pompidou's medical team assessed that he was only able to survive until October at the latest. His agenda was marked by numerous cancellations, such as his annual dinner given in honor of the diplomatic corps. In March, Le Monde reported that several Gaullist figures, such as Jacques Chaban-Delmas, Olivier Guichard, Roger Frey, Michel Debré and Jacques Foccart, had met to discuss the possibility of calling for Pompidou's resignation from office. The president chaired his last council of ministers on 27 March, when he mentioned that he was "going through very difficult times" and would retire to Cajarc. The United States embassy in Paris assessed that he would likely resign within a few months, paving the way for an early presidential election, as he was increasingly unable to carry out the burdens required by his presidency.

== Death ==
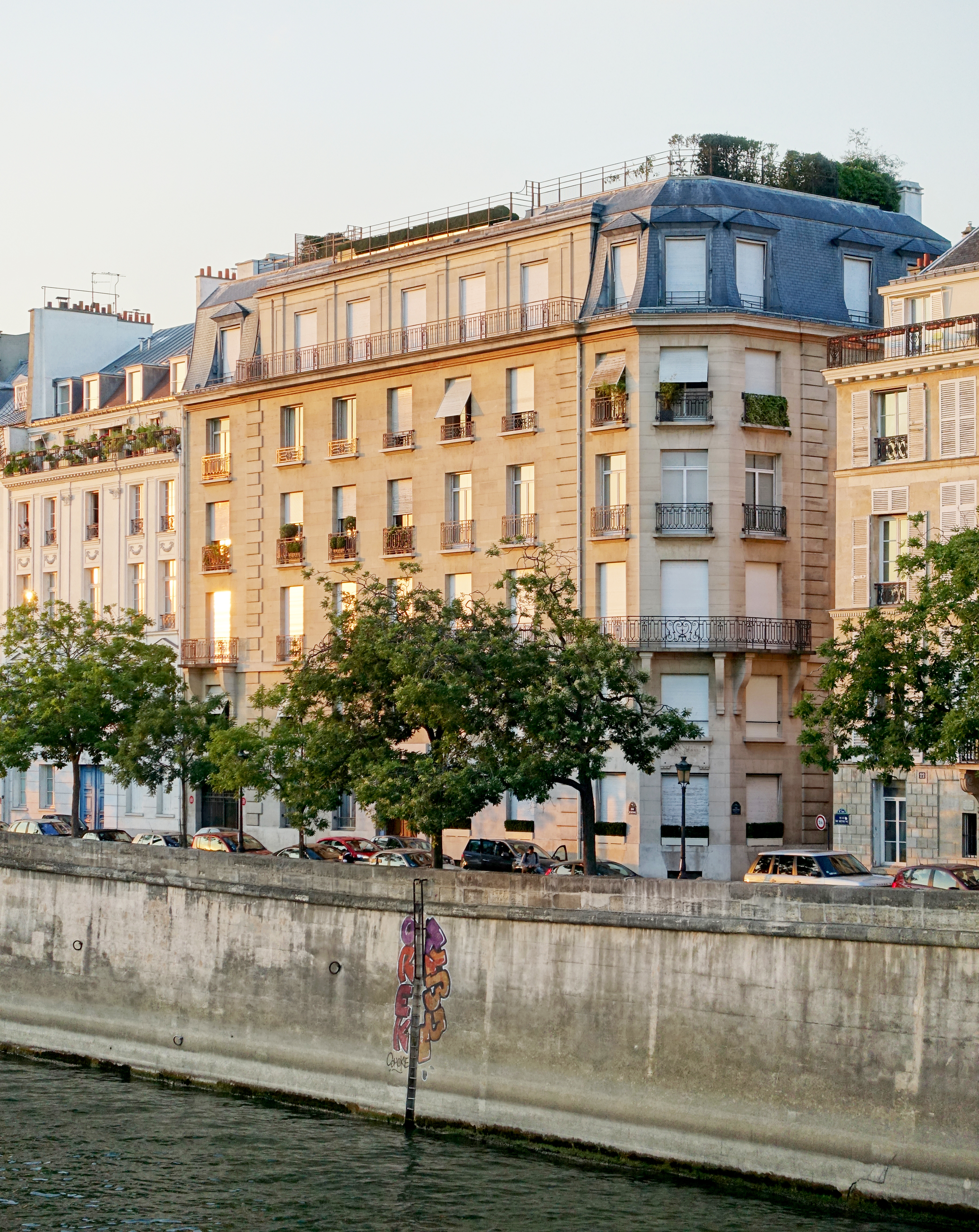
The Hôtel Hesselin (pictured in 2016), where Pompidou died

On 2 April, Pompidou was scheduled to meet with president of Rwanda Grégoire Kayibanda. This meeting was then cancelled, and Pompidou subsequently returned to rest at his residence in the Hôtel Hesselin in Paris. He died there in the evening, following complications from a prednisone-induced weakening of his immune system. His death was announced to the public at 22:15 on the state broadcaster ORTF.

Pompidou's widow, Claude, refused to receive public figures at the Quai de Béthune, where his remains laid in state. An exception was made for Pierre Messmer, mainly for the purposes of recovering the president's nuclear codes.

== Funeral ==
Pompidou was buried on 4 April during a private service in Orvilliers, in the department of Yvelines. He was given a simple grave, described as a "simple slab of stone" with "neither flowers nor wreaths, nor an elaborate funerary monument", as requested in his will written in August 1972.

A state Requiem Mass was held on 6 April at Notre-Dame de Paris, led by the Archbishop of Paris, Cardinal François Marty. The date of the service was declared a day of national mourning, and led to France's withdrawal from the Eurovision Song Contest 1974, the final of which was scheduled for the same day.

Among the dignitaries who attended the funeral service were:

- Richard Nixon, President of the United States
- Léopold Sédar Senghor, President of Senegal
- Rainier III, Sovereign Prince of Monaco, and Grace, Princess of Monaco
- Habib Bourguiba, President of Tunisia
- Ahmadou Ahidjo, President of Cameroon
- Nikolai Podgorny, President of the Presidium of the Supreme Soviet (head of state of the Soviet Union)
- Baudouin I, King of Belgium
- Prince Philip, Duke of Edinburgh (representing the Queen)
- Harold Wilson, Prime Minister of the United Kingdom
- Juliana, Queen of the Netherlands
- Pierre Elliott Trudeau, Prime Minister of Canada
  - Robert Bourassa, Premier of Quebec
- Willy Brandt, Chancellor of West Germany
- Giovanni Leone, President of the Italian Republic
- Zulfikar Ali Bhutto, Prime Minister of Pakistan
- Jean-Bédel Bokassa, President of the Central African Republic
- Hamani Diori, President of Niger
- Kakuei Tanaka, Prime Minister of Japan
- Sidi Mohammed bin Hassan al-Alawi, Crown Prince of Morocco

== Aftermath ==
Following Pompidou's death, Senate president Alain Poher became acting president. The government later announced that a new presidential election would be held on 5 May, with a second round two weeks later should no candidate reach a majority. The election was won by Valéry Giscard d'Estaing, who defeated Socialist Party candidate François Mitterrand in the second round.

== Legacy ==
Pompidou's sudden death led to a controversy over the concealing of his health issues from the public. The political class reached a consensus that future presidents would have to account for their state of health. Despite this, François Mitterrand, who pledged public transparency on his health during his 1981 presidential election campaign, later downplayed the severity of his prostate cancer during most of his presidency. In 2005, his successor Jacques Chirac was hospitalized after suffering a stroke, but an official bulletin did not publicly clarify whether it was part of a more serious health condition.

== In popular culture ==
Mort d'un président (Death of a President), a television film released in 2011, documents the final months of Pompidou's life.
