= Il Trespolo tutore =

Il Trespolo tutore (Trespolo the Tutor) is a 1679 comic opera in three acts by the Italian composer Alessandro Stradella with a libretto by Giovanni Cosimo Villifranchi, based on the play by Giovan Battista Ricciardi. The libretto had been set to music by Bernardo Pasquini in 1677. The version by Stradella was first performed at the Teatro Falcone, Genoa on 30 or 31 January, 1679. It is considered one of the first Italian comic operas, and the part of the tutor is one of the earliest basso buffo roles. The libretto has two mad scenes for Nino not found in the play.

== Performance history ==
The opera was revived in October 1686 at the Teatro Fontanelli in Modena. In 2004, a staging in a new edition by Michael Burden and with a new English singing translation by Simon Rees was given by New Chamber Opera at New College, Oxford.

== Roles ==
Role	Voice type	Premiere Cast
Trespolo	bass	Giovanni Battista Petriccioli
Artemisia his pupil	soprano	Caterina Angela Botteghi
Ciro	castrato (soprano)	Marcantonio Orrigoni
Nino Ciro's brother	castrato (contralto)	Francesco Vallerini
Simona nurse and servant to Nino	tenor (en travesti)	Francesco Guerra
Despina Simona's daughter	soprano	Annuccia

== Synopsis ==
Artemisia is in love with her tutor Trespolo but he is too dull-witted to realise this and is in love with the serving-maid Despina instead. Two brothers, Ciro and Nino, are in love with Artemisia; one of them goes mad and the other, who has been insane, is cured. The plot becomes more and more farcically complicated until, in the end, Trespolo marries Despina and Artemisia marries Ciro.

== Editions ==
The manuscript is located in the Biblioteca Estense in Modena. The new edition by Michael Burden appeared in 2024 in the Collected Works of Stradella.

== Recordings ==
Andrea de Carlo (conductor), Arcana 2020 (recorded 23–29 August 2019). OCLC 1257500447.

== Sources ==
- Casaglia, Gherardo (2005). "Il Trespolo tutore, 30 January 1679". L'Almanacco di Gherardo Casaglia (in Italian).
- Dixon, Graham (1993), "Alessandro Stradella", p. 1017, in The Viking Opera Guide, edited by Amanda Holden. London: Viking.
- Loewenberg, Alfred (1978). Annals of Opera 1597–1940 (third edition, revised). Totowa, New Jersey: Rowman and Littlefield. ISBN 9780874718515.
- Del Teatro (in Italian)
- Magazine de l'opéra baroque (in French)
