= Ballet Royal de la Nuit =

Ballet premiered in 1653 in Paris, France

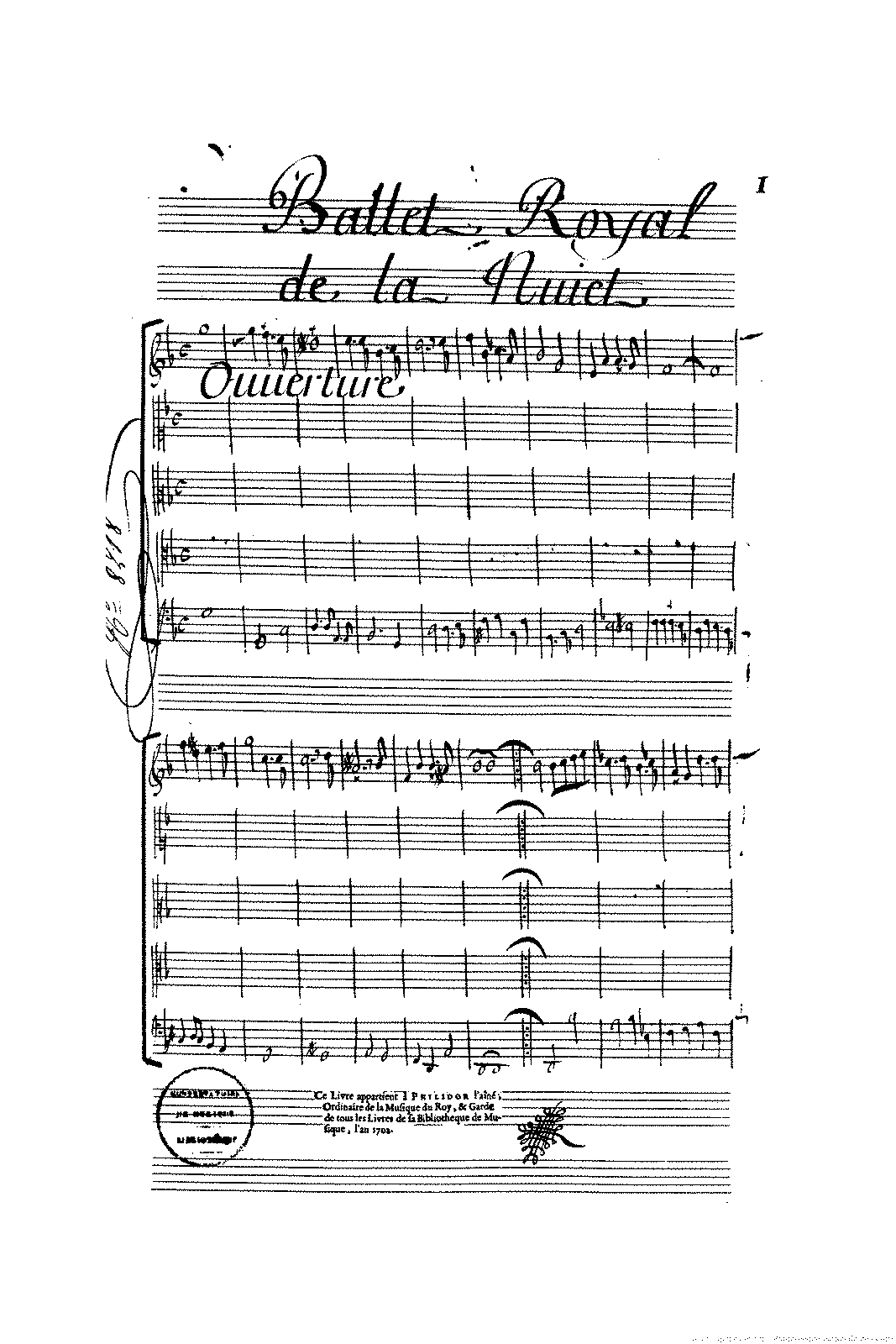
First page of a 1690 manuscript copy of the musical score for the Ballet Royal de la Nuict, part of the Philidor Collection at the Bibliothèque nationale de France

The Ballet Royal de la Nuit (Royal Ballet of the Night), Ballet Royal de la Nuict in its original spelling and often referred to simply as the Ballet de la Nuit, is a ballet de cour with a libretto by Isaac de Benserade and music by Jean de Cambefort, Jean-Baptiste Boësset, Michel Lambert and possibly others, which premiered on February 23, 1653, at the Salle du Petit-Bourbon in Paris. It took 13 hours to perform and included the debut of the fourteen-year-old Louis XIV as Apollo, the Sun King (Le Roi Soleil).

== Plot and music outline ==
The Ballet de la Nuit concerned the four Watches (veilles) of the night, beginning at 6 o'clock in the evening and ending at 6 o'clock in the morning: the first watch (sunset) lasted from 6 p.m. to 9 p.m.; the second, from 9 p.m. to 12 a.m.; the third, from 12 a.m. to 3 a.m., and the fourth (sunrise), from 3 a.m. to 6 a.m. With airs by Jean de Cambefort, it was an extravagant court spectacle featuring forty-five entrees and three ballets within a ballet, which took about 13 hours to perform. The plot included mythological goddesses such as Venus and Diana, werewolves, demonic creatures and witches who celebrated a black Sabbath in the horrors of the night. Shepherds, gypsies, thieves, lamplighters, beggars and crippled are among the "realistic" characters of the play. King Louis XIV appears with the coming of the day as the sun god Apollo, one of his many personifications as the rising sun, emphasizing the power of the monarchy and its closeness to the divine.

== Costumes ==
Henri de Gissey (c. 1621–73), Dessinateur ordinaire du Cabinet du Roy, was in charge of dress design for the royal ballets. A collection of 10 scenic and 117 costume designs for the ballet made for Louis Hesselin (1602–1662) and attributed to Gissey are now at Waddesdon Manor. Another folio with 119 costume designs made for Denis-Pierre-Jean Papillon de la Ferté (1727–1794) is now in Paris at the Bibliothèque de l'Institut (MS 1004).

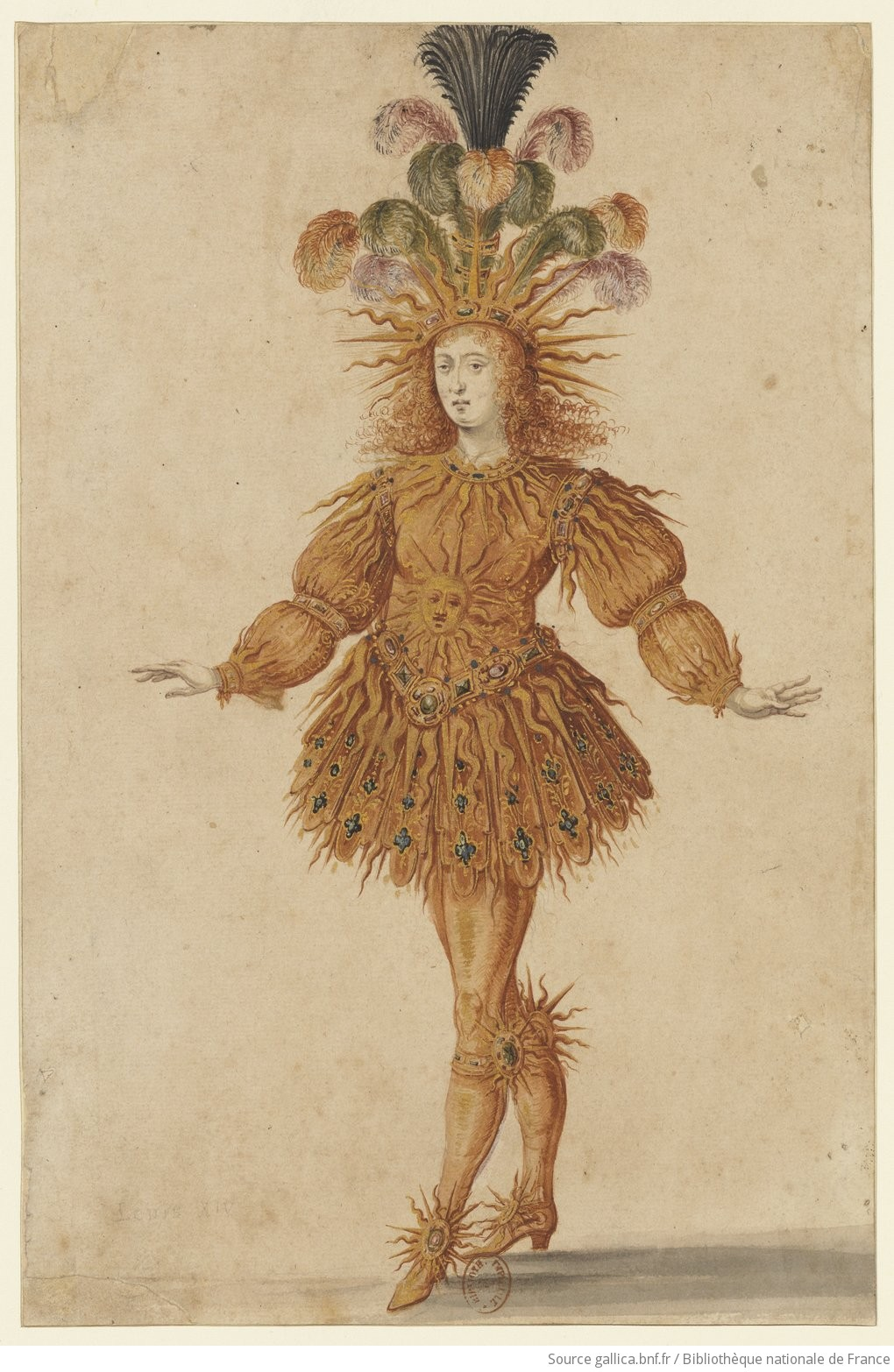
The costume of Apollon, performed by Louis XIV

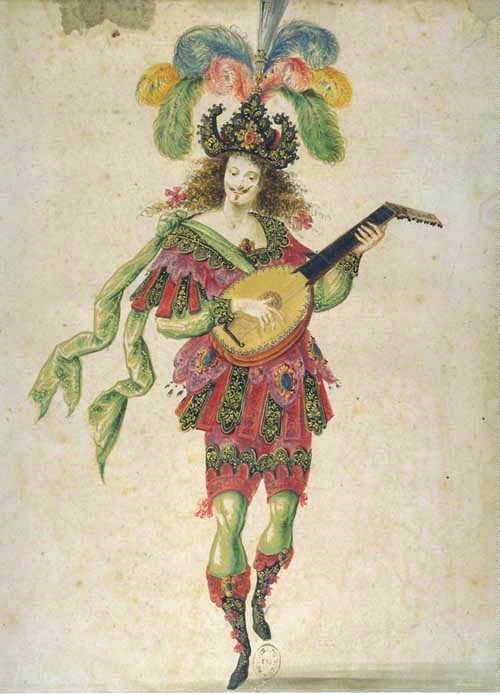
The costume of the lute player

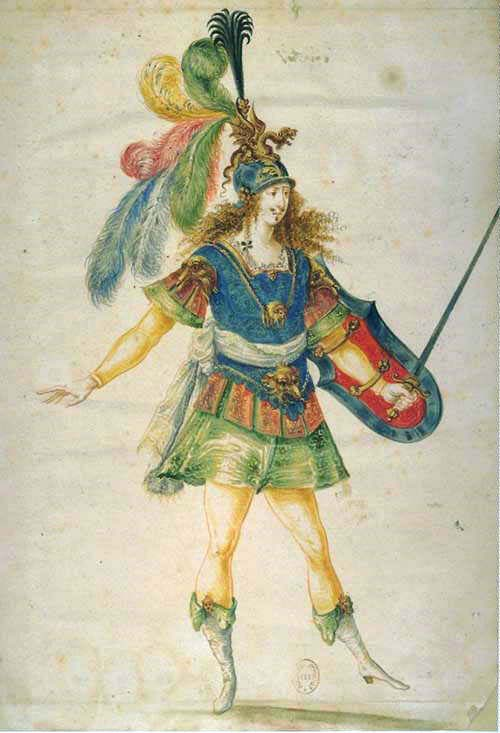
The costume of the soldier

== Ballet de la Nuit in facsimile ==
The Ballet de la Nuit was the subject of the annual Oxford Dance Symposium in 2004, and there is an extensive study of the work by a group of scholars. The symposium met at Waddesdon Manor, where the folio volume (Rothschild B1/16/6) with the arms of Louis Hesselin on the cover that contains stage and costumes designs is kept. It also met at Oxford on the same day, where papers were given on many aspects of the ballet. Michael Burden and Jennifer Thorp subsequently published a volume Ballet de la Nuit: Rothschild B1/16/6 with the Pendragon Press in New York. The essays in the volume are: Michael Burden "The Ballet de la Nuit"; David Parrott: "Art, ceremony and performance: Cardinal Mazarin and cultural patronage at the court of Louis XIV"; Jennifer Thorp: "Dances and dancers in the Ballet de la Nuit"; and Catherine Massip: "The Ballet de la Nuit: a political and musical statement". The foreword is by Jacob Rothschild, 4th Baron Rothschild. The volume also includes some of the surviving sources for the ballet, including a facsimile of the livret and a reproduction of the scenography from Rothschild B1/16/6. It also includes a modern edition of the surviving music by Lionel Sawkins. This was the first ballet de cour to be published in complete form.

== Film ==
There is one scene from Ballet Royal de la Nuit in the historical movie Le Roi danse (scene used in this movie is from the end of ballet, called The sun rise, fr. Le Roi représentant le soleil levant).

== Recordings ==
- Ballet Royal de La Nuit, Ensemble Correspondances, Sébastien Daucé, Harmonia Mundi 2020

== See also ==
- French ballet

== Bibliography ==
- Bjurström, Per (1962). Giacomo Torelli and Baroque Stage Design, 2nd revised edition, translated from the Swedish. Stockholm: Almqvist & Wiksell. OCLC 10226792.
- Burden, Michael; Thorp, Jennifer (2009; revised 2010). Ballet de la Nuit: Rothschild B1/16/6. Hillsdale, New York: Pendragon Press. ISBN 9781576471432. Product page for the revised edition at Pendragon.
- Apollo's Angels A history of Ballet by Jennifer Homans 2010
