= Hesselin Madonna =

1640–1645 painting by Simon Vouet

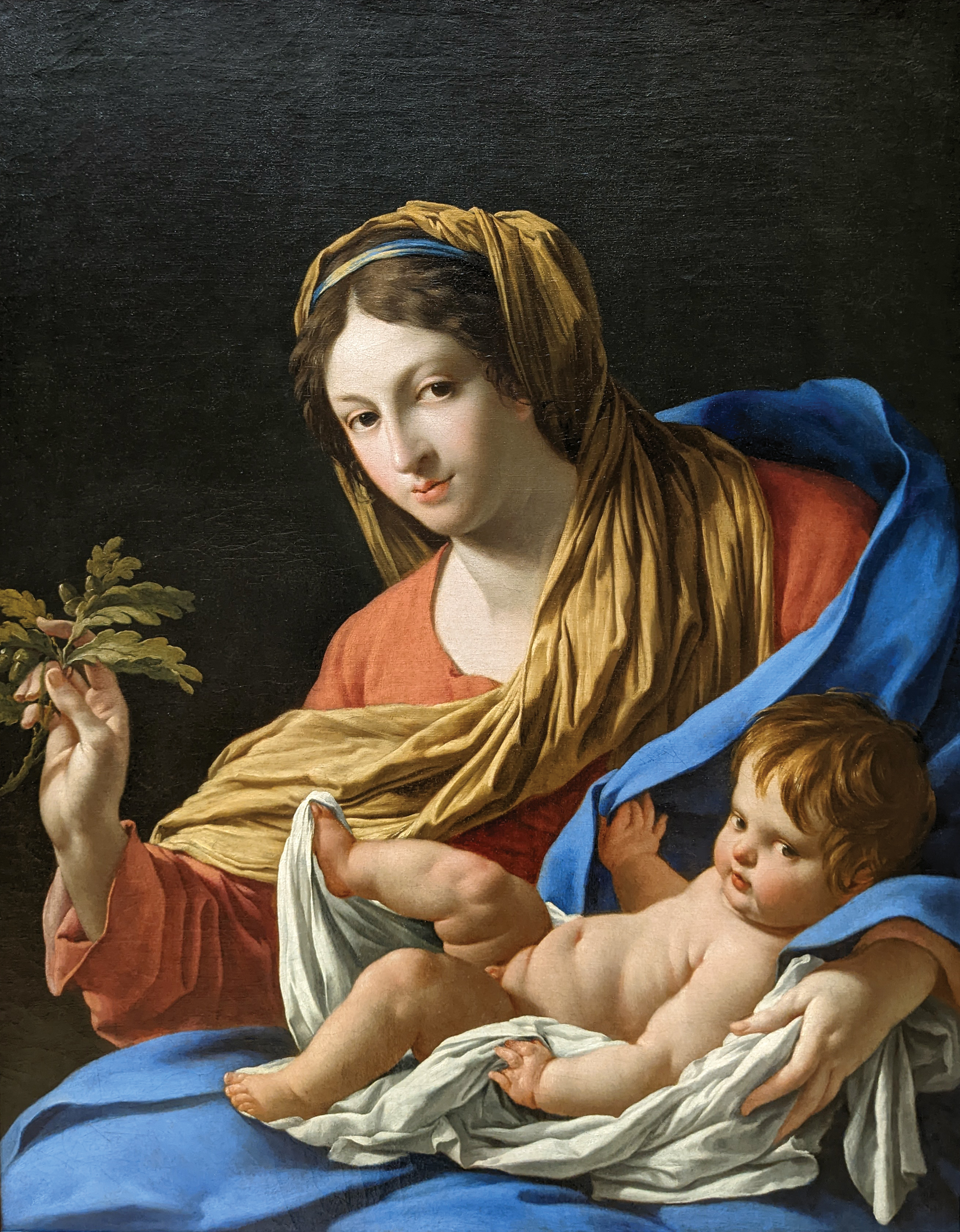
Hesselin Madonna (c. 1640–1645) by Simon Vouet

The Hesselin Madonna (French - La Vierge Hesselin, La Vierge à l'enfant Hesselin or La Madone Hesselin) or Madonna of the Oak Cutting (La Vierge au rameau de chêne) is an oil on canvas painting produced by Simon Vouet for the Paris house of Louis XIII's secretary Louis Hesselin around 1640–1645. Its history between then and 1904, when it was exhibited in a gallery in London, is unknown. In 2004 it was bought for the Louvre in Paris.

== Sources ==
- http://www.latribunedelart.com/la-vierge-hesselin-de-simon-vouet-entre-au-louvre-grace-au-mecenat-d-entreprise
