= Doriclea =

Doriclea may refer to:

- La Doriclea (Cavalli)
- La Doriclea (Stradella)
