= Jean de Cambefort =

French composer and singer

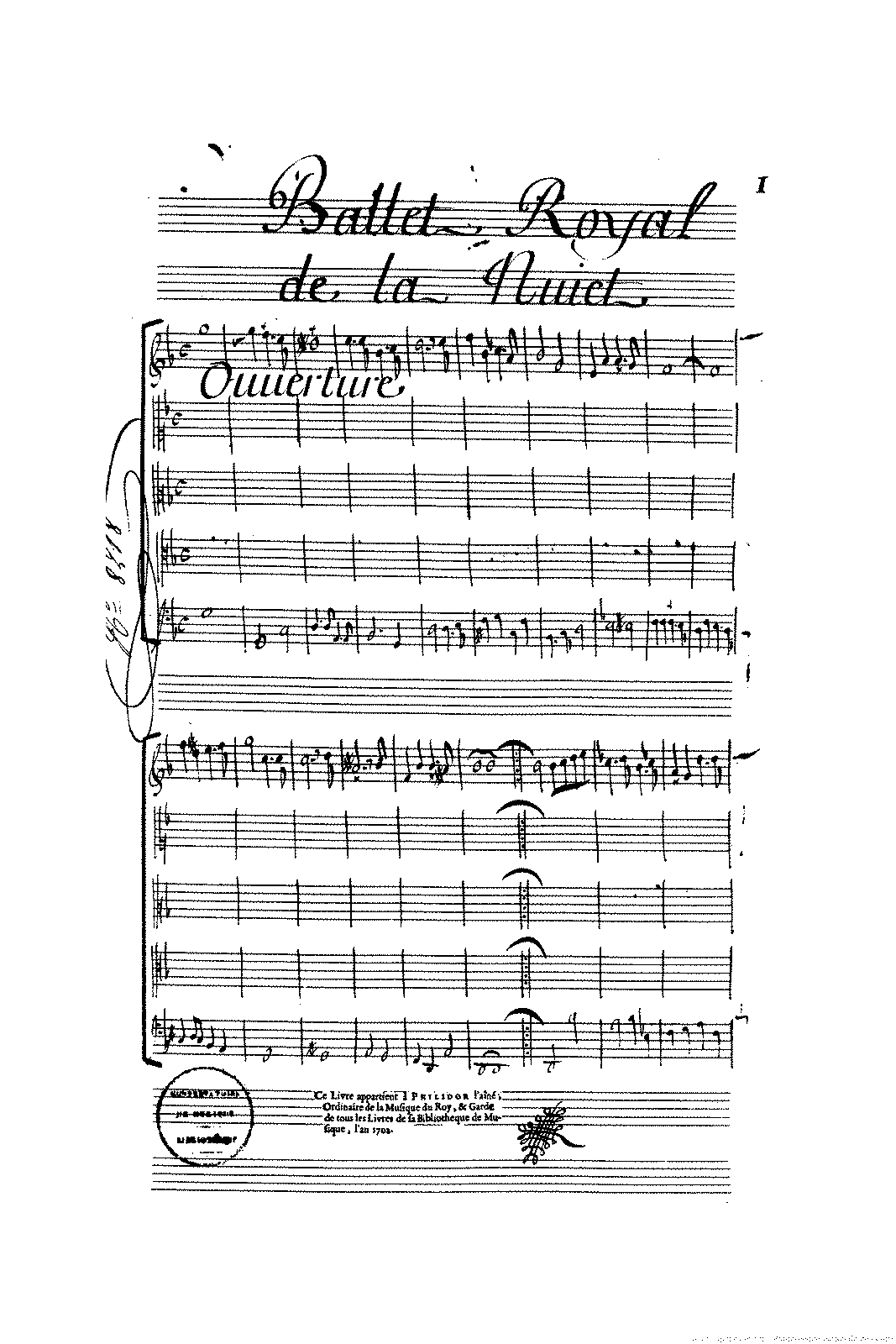
First page of a 1690 manuscript copy of the musical score for the Ballet Royal de la Nuict, part of the Philidor Collection at the Bibliothèque nationale de France

Jean de Cambefort (c. 1605 – 4 May 1661) was a French Baroque singer and composer of ballets and liturgical music. He died in Paris, France. He is now mostly remembered for composing six airs (recits) for the Ballet de la Nuit, performed in 1653.

== Works ==
- Ballet de la Nuit, 1653;
- Récit du temps et des quatre saisons, v Ballet du Temps (LWV 1), 1654;
- Airs de cour, Parigi, 1651;
- II. livre d’airs, Parigi, 1655;
- 17 arias, from 1651 and 1655.

== Bibliography ==
- Burden, Michael; Thorp, Jennifer (2009; revised 2010). Ballet de la Nuit: Rothschild B1/16/6. Hillsdale, New York: Pendragon Press. ISBN 9781576471432. Product page for the revised edition at Pendragon.
- McGowan, Margaret M. (2001). "Cambefort, Jean de" in The New Grove Dictionary of Music and Musicians, 2nd edition, edited by Stanley Sadie. London: Macmillan. ISBN 9781561592395 (hardcover). OCLC 419285866 (eBook).
- Prunières, Henry (1912). "Jean de Cambefort, surintendant de la musique du roi, d'après des documents inédits", L'Année musicale, pp. 205–226.
