= Il Pomo d'Oro (orchestra) =

Italian ensemble specialising in Baroque music

Il Pomo d'Oro is a prize-winning orchestra founded in 2012 and named after the opera Il pomo d'oro by Antonio Cesti. The ensemble specialises in Historically informed performance of music from the Baroque and Classical period, which it performs and records led by its own lead violinists Federico Guglielmo and Zefira Valova, or by guest conductors including Maxim Emelyanychev (chief conductor since 2016), Riccardo Minasi, Stefano Montanari, George Petrou, Enrico Onofri, Francesco Corti, Zefira Valova and the Stradella specialist Andrea De Carlo.

== Discography ==
The ensemble has produced the following recordings:

- 2012: Concerti Per Violino V, Per Pisendel, Vivaldi
- 2012: Bad Guys
- 2012: Concerti Per Violino IV L'imperatore, Vivaldi
- 2013: Arias for Caffarelli
- 2014: Tamerlano, Handel
- 2015: Arie Napoletane
- 2015: Partenope, Handel
- 2015: Catone in Utica, Vinci
- 2017: Carnevale 1729
- 2017: Ottone, Handel
- 2018: Serse, Handel
- 2018: Doriclea, Stradella
- 2020: Agrippina, Handel
- 2022: Theodora, Handel
- 2022: Apollo e Dafne and Armida abbandonata, Handel
