= Maxim Emelyanychev =

Russian conductor and pianist (born 1988)

Maxim Emelyanychev Максим Юрьевич Емельянычев
- Born: 28 August 1988; Dzerzhinsk, Russia
- Genre: Classical
- Occupation: Conductor
- Instruments: Piano, Harpsichord, Cornet
- Years active: 2003–present

Maxim Yuryevich Emelyanychev (Максим Юрьевич Емельянычев; born 28 August 1988, Dzerzhinsk) is a Russian conductor, pianist, harpsichordist and cornetist.

== Biography ==
From a musical family, Emelyanychev studied music at the Nizhny Novgorod Choral College from 1995 to 2003.

Emelyanychev joined the period instrument ensemble Il Pomo d'Oro in 2011. He became chief conductor of Il Pomo d'Oro in 2016. He and the ensemble have recorded commercially for Erato and for Aparté.

In March 2018, Emelyanychev first guest-conducted the Scottish Chamber Orchestra (SCO), as an emergency substitute for Robin Ticciati. Based on this appearance, in May 2018, the SCO announced the appointment of Emelyanychev as its next principal conductor, effective with the 2019–2020 season. Emelyanychev and the SCO have commercially recorded for Linn Records the Symphony No. 9 of Franz Schubert, which was on Emelyanychev's debut programme with the SCO in March 2018. In November 2019, the SCO announced the extension of Emelyanychev's contract as principal conductor through 2025. In April 2023, the SCO announced an additional extension of Emelyanychev's contract as principal conductor through "at least 2028". In April 2026, the SCO announced the most recent extension of Emelyanychev's contract as principal conductor through "at least 2031".

Emelyanychev has received four Grammy nominations.

Cultural offices
Preceded by Riccardo Minasi	Chief Conductor, Il Pomo d'Oro; 2016–present	Succeeded by incumbent
Preceded by Robin Ticciati	Principal Conductor, Scottish Chamber Orchestra; 2019–present	Succeeded by incumbent
