= Oxford Dance Symposium =

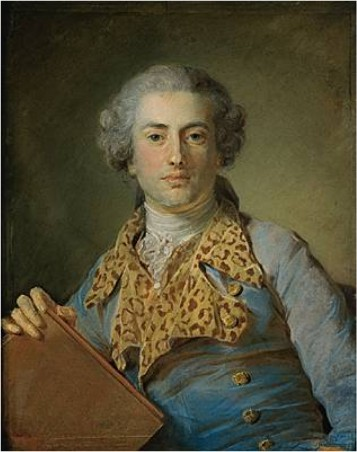
Jean-Georges Noverre (Perronneau, 1764, Louvre)

The first Oxford Dance Symposium at New College, Oxford took place on 21 April 1999 with Dance on the English Stage, and has become an annual, international event which attracts scholars and practitioners from many parts of the world. Each symposium is designed to explore different aspects of dance, with particular reference to its musical, theatrical, literary and social context in Britain and Europe during the long 18th century; as such has embraced subjects ranging from the 17th-century Stuart Masque and French ballet de cour to early 19th-century opera and ballet. There is a particular emphasis on new research or new appraisals of existing sources. Although the symposium issues no Proceedings, some of the papers from several symposia have been published as books of essays or as individual papers in academic journals. The symposium is organised each year by Michael Burden and Jennifer Thorp.

== Symposia ==
- XXVXIX: Characters on Stage: real, symbolic, imaginary, April 2027
- XXVIII: Staging Dance, April 2026
- XXVII: Dancing Objects, April 2025
- XXVI: Dance and Institutions, April 2024
- XXV: Dance, Costume and Scenography, April 2023
- XXIV: Dancing in Town and Country, April 2022
- XXIII: Watching Dance, Dancers, and Audiences, April 2021
- XXII: COVID-19
- XXI: Reading Dance, April 2019
- XX: Dance and Drama, April 2018
- XIX: Dance and the City, April 2017
- XVIII: Teaching Dance, April 2016
- XVII: Dancing for Anniversaries and Occasions: Chamber, Court, Theatre & Assembly, April 2015
- XVI: The dancer in celebrity culture in the long 18th-century: reputations, images, portraits, April 2014
- XV: Living, dancing, travelling, dying: dancers’ lives in the long 18th century, April 2013
- XIV: Dancing in the theatre of Europe in the long 18th century, April 2012
- XIII: Dance and the novel, May 2011
- XII: Jean-Georges Noverre and his circle, April 2010
- XI: Dance and Image, May 2009
- X: Dancing in Royal Palaces, May 2008
- IX: French and English Pantomime, May 2007
- VIII: Dancers Abroad, May 2006
- VII: 'Counting sheep'; Dance and the Pastoral, April 2005
- VI: Royal Ballet de la Nuit, April 2004 see Ballet Royal de la Nuit.
- V: Roi Soleil and Soleil Dieu, March 2003
- IV: Dancing Exploded, October, 2002
- III: Gods, Men and Monsters, April 2001
- II: 'So Publick an Approbation': attitudes to dance in 18th-Century England, April 2000
- I: Dance on the English Stage, April 1999

== Publications ==
The symposium does not publish proceedings, but publications relating to the sessions have subsequently appeared.

- Michael Burden and Jennifer Thorp, eds, With a Grace Not to be Captured; Representing the Georgian Theatrical Dancer, 1760-1830 (Turnhout, Belgium: Brepols, 2020). The book was joint winner of the 2021 Claire Brook Award for an outstanding volume on music iconography published in 2020. The award is made by the Barry S. Brook Center for Music Research and Documentation at CUNY.
- Michael Burden and Jennifer Thorp, eds, The works of Monsieur Noverre translated from the French: Noverre, his circle, and the English Lettres sur la danse (Hillsdale, New York: Pendragon Press, 2014).
- Michael Burden and Jennifer Thorp, guest eds, Music in Art: International Journal for Music Iconography: Special Issue Dance and Image, 36/1-2 (2011).
- Michael Burden and Jennifer Thorp, guest eds, The Court Historian: Special Issue Dancing in Royal Palaces, 15/2 (2010).
- Michael Burden and Jennifer Thorp, eds, The Ballet de la Nuit: ROTHSCHILD B1/16/6 (Hillsdale, New York: Pendragon Press, 2009).
- Michael Burden and Jennifer Thorp, guest eds, Early Music: Dance in Restoration England, 26/4 (2007).
