= British Society for Eighteenth-Century Studies =

Learned society

The British Society for Eighteenth-Century Studies (BSECS) is an interdisciplinary scholarly society founded in 1971 and based in the United Kingdom which promotes the study of all aspects of eighteenth-century history and culture. Its members are both academics and members of the public from all over the world with a diverse range of interests in the history, literature, art history, architecture, music, science, and wider culture of the long eighteenth century between approximately 1660 and 1820. BSECS is an affiliate of the International Society for Eighteenth-Century Studies (ISECS).

The society's official journal is The Journal for Eighteenth-Century Studies (JECS). It was founded in 1978 and is currently published by Wiley-Blackwell. It is a leading scholarly journal in the field of long eighteenth-century studies, and publishes essays and reviews in eighteenth-century literature, history, and culture from scholars based across the world. It is received by all the Society's members, and is subscribed to by many individuals and institutions, including many university libraries. All volumes of JECS are available in both printed and electronic format.

The society organizes an annual three-day conference in January, normally held at St Hugh's College, Oxford, which is attended by scholars from across the world. It also offers a range of fellowships and bursaries to support research into eighteenth-century history, literature, and culture.

== History ==
BSECS was founded at a meeting held at Birkbeck College in 1971. The first president of the society was Robert Niklaus. From the start, BSECS was closely allied with ISECS. In its early years, many BSECS members were academics working in modern language studies, particularly in French literature and philosophy. Over time, BSECS began to attract a more diverse membership and by the 1980s members were drawn from scholars working across the humanities and more frequently in English than in French. The society organised its first conference in 1971, and has continued to offer an annual conference in every year since.

The society began publishing a newsletter in 1972. This included lists of members' names and research interests, reports of conferences and the society's AGM, reviews of publications, and lists of other publications received. In 1978, this was considerably expanded into an academic journal, edited by Joan Pittock-Wesson, with the title The British Journal for Eighteenth-Century Studies. As well incorporating content from the newsletter, this also published original articles and conference papers, with the former gradually becoming the main content. In 2008, the journal was renamed as simply The Journal for Eighteenth-Century Studies and moved to four issues per year.

== Presidents ==
The current president (from 2024) is Matthew McCormack. Past presidents include:

2021 Brycchan Carey

2018 Caroline Warman

2015 Matthew Grenby

2013 Jeremy Gregory

2010 Michael Burden

2008 Penelope Corfield

2006 John Dunkley

2004 Frank O’Gorman

2002 Derek Hughes

2000 Janet Todd

1998 Brean Hammond

1996 Anthony Strugnell

1990s David Williams

1980s Dennis Fletcher, Haydn Mason, Pat Rogers

1970s Vivienne Mylne

1971 Robert Niklaus
