= Sebastiano Baldini =

Roman poet and librettist (1615–1685)

Sebastiano Baldini (1615–1685) was a satirical Roman poet, librettist for almost every composer operating in Rome at that time, and a secretary to a series of cardinals. The most important was Flavio Chigi. For his literary qualities and his good humour he was well received by the aristocracy and Roman cultural circles. Alessandro Stradella used a text by Baldini, based on a scenario by Christina, Queen of Sweden, for his 1677 cantata/serenata La forza delle stelle (also incorrectly known as Il Damone).

He was a member of various academies, including those of literary humorists in Rome and Pesaro (founded in 1645). Baldini was drawn by Pier Francesco Mola.
