= Michael Burden =

British musicologist

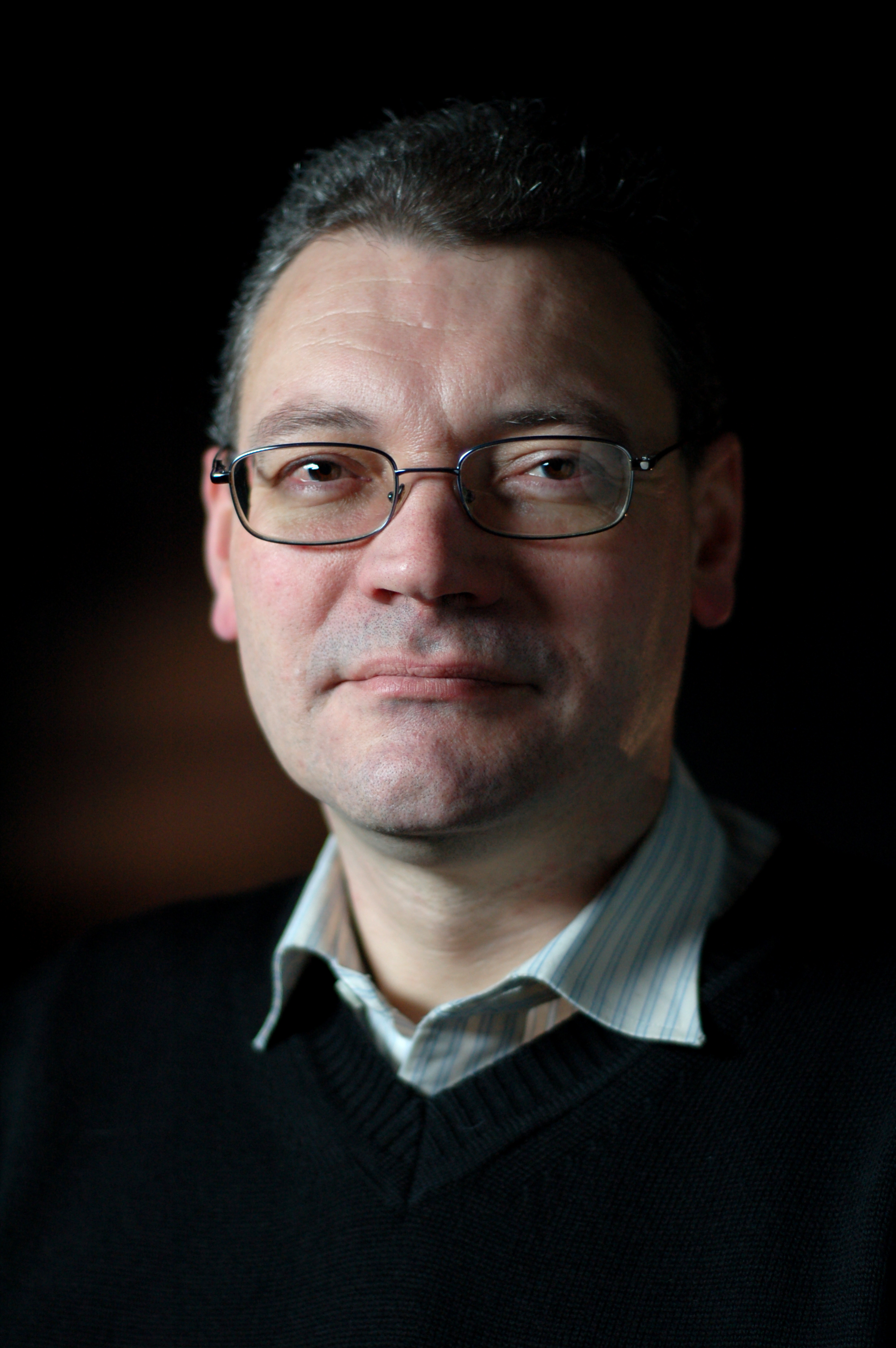
Michael Burden, 2013

Michael Burden, FAHA, (born 14 March 1960) is an Australian musicologist, working in the United Kingdom. He was elected a Corresponding Fellow of the Australian Academy of the Humanities in 2018.

== Life ==
Born in Adelaide, South Australia, he was educated at Pulteney Grammar School and the University of Adelaide; his took his PhD at the University of Edinburgh. He is currently Fellow in Music, Dean and Chattels Fellow at New College, Oxford; he is also director of New Chamber Opera, and Professor of Opera Studies in the Faculty of Music, University of Oxford. In 2016, he became the international patron of the St Peter’s Cathedral Music Foundation, which supports the music of St Peter's Cathedral, Adelaide, and is a member of the Pioneers Association of South Australia.

== Research ==
His research is on the stage music of Purcell, and on aspects of dance and theatre in the 17th, 18th, and 19th centuries, and includes a catalogue of Metastasio’s operas as performed in London, an edition of Le Ballet de la Nuit: Rothschild B1/16/6 with Jennifer Thorp, and a biographical account of Regina Mingotti’s years in London. He is currently completing a book on the staging of opera in London 1660 to 1860. Much of his recent research has been directed towards the London Stage Project.

With Jennifer Thorp, he organises the annual Oxford Dance Symposium, which takes place each year at New College.

His collection of mainly 18th century English theatre books, music, and other ephemera is gradually being accepted in a series of gifts to the Rare Books collection by the Barr Smith Library at the University of Adelaide.

== Editorial Boards, Editing ==
With Jonathan Hicks and Caroline Radcliffe, he is joint editor of the series 'Nineteenth-century British Theatrical Culture'.

He is on the editorial boards of the Journal for Eighteenth-Century Studies, and the series 'Studies in British Musical Cultures' published by Clemson University Press. He has been Consultant Editor for numbers of the journal Early Music ('Music in Purcell's London I' (1995); 'Music in Purcell's London II'; (1996), Metastasio (1998)) and Guest Editor for numbers of the journals Journal for Eighteenth-Century Studies - 'Farinelli' (2004) - and with Jennifer Thorp for Music in Art (2010) and The Court Historian (2010).

He is on the editorial committees for the collected music editions of the works of Alessandro Stradella and John Eccles. His own editions include

- Benedetto Marcello, Il pianto e il riso delle quattro stagioni, Recent Researches in Music of the Baroque Era, 115 (Wisconsin: A-R Editions, 2002).
- Henry Purcell, The Fairy-Queen (London: Edition Eulenburg, 2009); the first complete edition of both the text and the music.
- William Walton, The Bear, William Walton Collected Edition, 2 (Oxford University Press, 2010).
- Benedetto Marcello, Il Trionfo della Poesia, e della Musica nel celebrasi la morte, le esaltazione, e la inconronazione di Maria Sempore Virgine assunta in Cielo. Recent Researches in Music of the Baroque Era, 191 (Wisconsin: A-R Editions, 2016).
- Francesco Cavalli, Erismena, Collected Cavalli Edition (Bärenreiter Verlag, Kassel, 2018). Performed New College, Oxford, July 2010. Performed by Yale Baroque Opera Project on 1 and 2 May 2015. http://ybop.yale.edu
- John Eccles, Revels on the Peace of Ryswick, Recent Researches in Music of the Baroque Era, 209 (Wisconsin: A-R Editions, 2019).
- Alessandro Stradella, Il Trespolo tutore, Alessandro Stradella Opera Omnia, 3 (Pisa: Edizioni ETS, 2024).
- Domenico Paradies, Fetonte, Recent Researches in Music of the Baroque Era, 242 (Wisconsin: A-R Editions, 2025).

== Personal ==
One of his interests outside music is architectural history, particularly the history of architecture and town planning in Adelaide, South Australia. His first book was a photographic exploration of demolished buildings of that city. Published as Lost Adelaide by Oxford University Press in 1983, it remains a classic text in the documentation of Adelaide's lost architectural heritage.

== See also ==
- Oxford Dance Symposium
- New Chamber Opera

== Sources ==
- RISM UK.
- Besterman Centre for the Enlightenment.
- Oxford Centre for Life-Writing.
- Ballad Operas Online.
