= Hôtel Hesselin =

Coordinates: 48.850782°N 2.35740°E

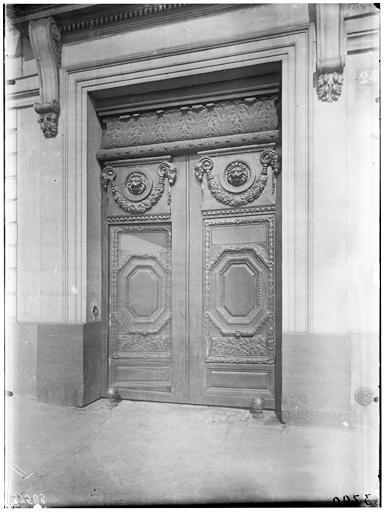
Carriage-entrance doors, sculpted by Étienne Le Hongre, photographed by Eugène Atget in 1899

The Hôtel Hesselin (French pronunciation: [otɛl ɛslɛ̃]), later known as the Hôtel d'Ambrun (French pronunciation: [otɛl dɑ̃bʁœ̃]), was an aristocratic town house (hôtel particulier) located in Paris that was erected around 1639 to 1642 for Louis Hesselin to the designs of the French architect Louis Le Vau. It was on the south side of the Île Saint-Louis, west of the rue Poulletier at its intersection with the quai du Dauphin (now 24 quai de Béthune, 4th arrondissement of Paris). The hotel was demolished in 1935 by Helena Rubinstein, who had a new building erected to the designs of the architect Louis Süe.

== Architecture ==
=== Layout ===
Le Vau's designs for the Hôtel Hesselin were reproduced in six engravings by Jean Marot, which were published in the Grand Marot in 1686. The house shows Le Vau's skill at adapting plans to unique and unusual sites. Since the plot was located on a quiet quai, where street noise was minimal, he moved the entrance courtyard, which typically kept the main part of the house, the corps de logis, far away from the street, to behind the wings used for living, so the latter were near the River Seine and provided vistas across the river toward the University and upriver toward Salpêtrière Hospital. The courtyard was reached from the quai via a carriage entryway (porte cochère) and passageway. The impressive doors of the carriage entryway were sculpted by Étienne Le Hongre and have been preserved. The courtyard led directly to the garden at the rear, and the stables were east of the garden, along the rue Poulletier. On the right side of the courtyard a short flight of steps led to a highly decorated vestibule with a grand staircase on its south side leading to the main floor above, where there was a grand gallery (grande galerie) running parallel to the quai, with four windows overlooking the river to the south and three, the courtyard to the north.

Louis Le Vau's plans (river quai at the bottom), engraved by Jean Marot

Plan of the basement

Plan of the ground floor

Plan of the main floor

=== Elevations ===
Another imaginative feature of the house was the arrangement of the facades along the river. Le Vau was also responsible for the design and construction of the house to the left, the Hôtel Sainctot, the river side of which was nearly complete by 1640. He combined the elevations of the two houses so they formed a nearly symmetrical ensemble.

Elevations and view, engraved by Jean Marot

River facades of the Hôtel Hesselin (three-bay central pavilion and six-bay façade on the right); Hôtel Sainctot (five-bay façade on the left)

Garden facades (Hôtel Sainctot to the right)

Long section, view to the east
Courtyard of the Hôtel Hesselin, photographed by Eugène Atget in 1899

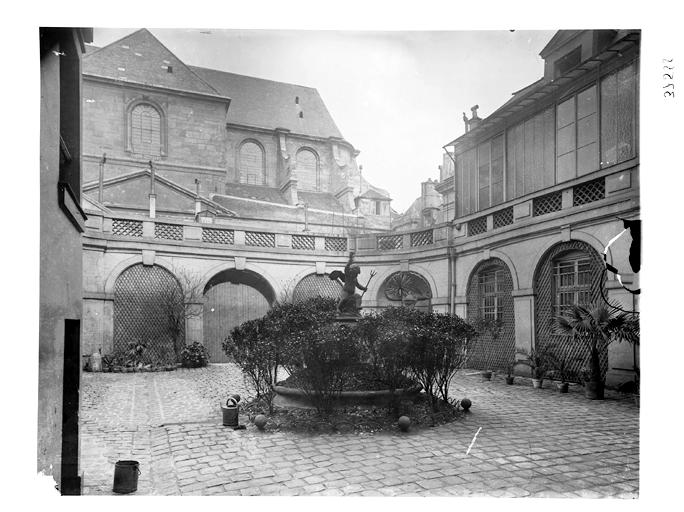
Courtyard viewed from the southwest.
The Église Saint-Louis-en-l'Île is in the background.

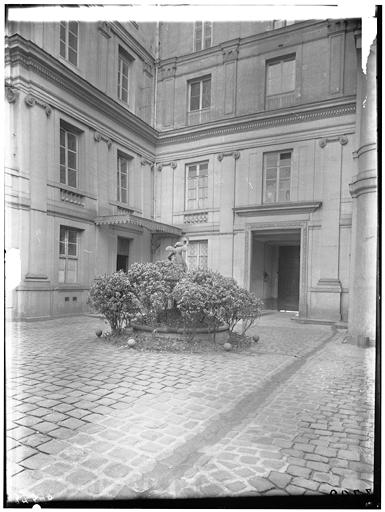
View of the courtyard toward the carriage passageway to the street

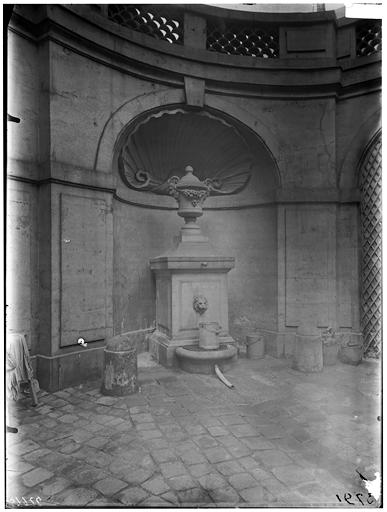
Fountain in the northeast corner

== Demolition ==
The Hôtel Hesselin was purchased in 1932 by the rich American cosmetics magnate Helena Rubinstein "for a song" and had tenants living in it. After nearly three years, when the last of the tenants moved out, Helena Rubinstein moved to have the hotel demolished despite the neighbouring residents and press protesting against the demolition. She justified her decision by saying the foundations had been undermined by repeated flooding of the Seine. The hotel was demolished in 1935 at the request of Rubinstein, and a new building was erected to the designs of the architect Louis Süe. The new building incorporated elements from the original, including Le Hongre's doors from the carriage entryway and an iron balcony, which had been declared a monument historique in 1927. Georges Pompidou, president of the French Republic from 1969 to 1974, resided in this building.

24 Quai de Béthune: new building designed by Louis Süe

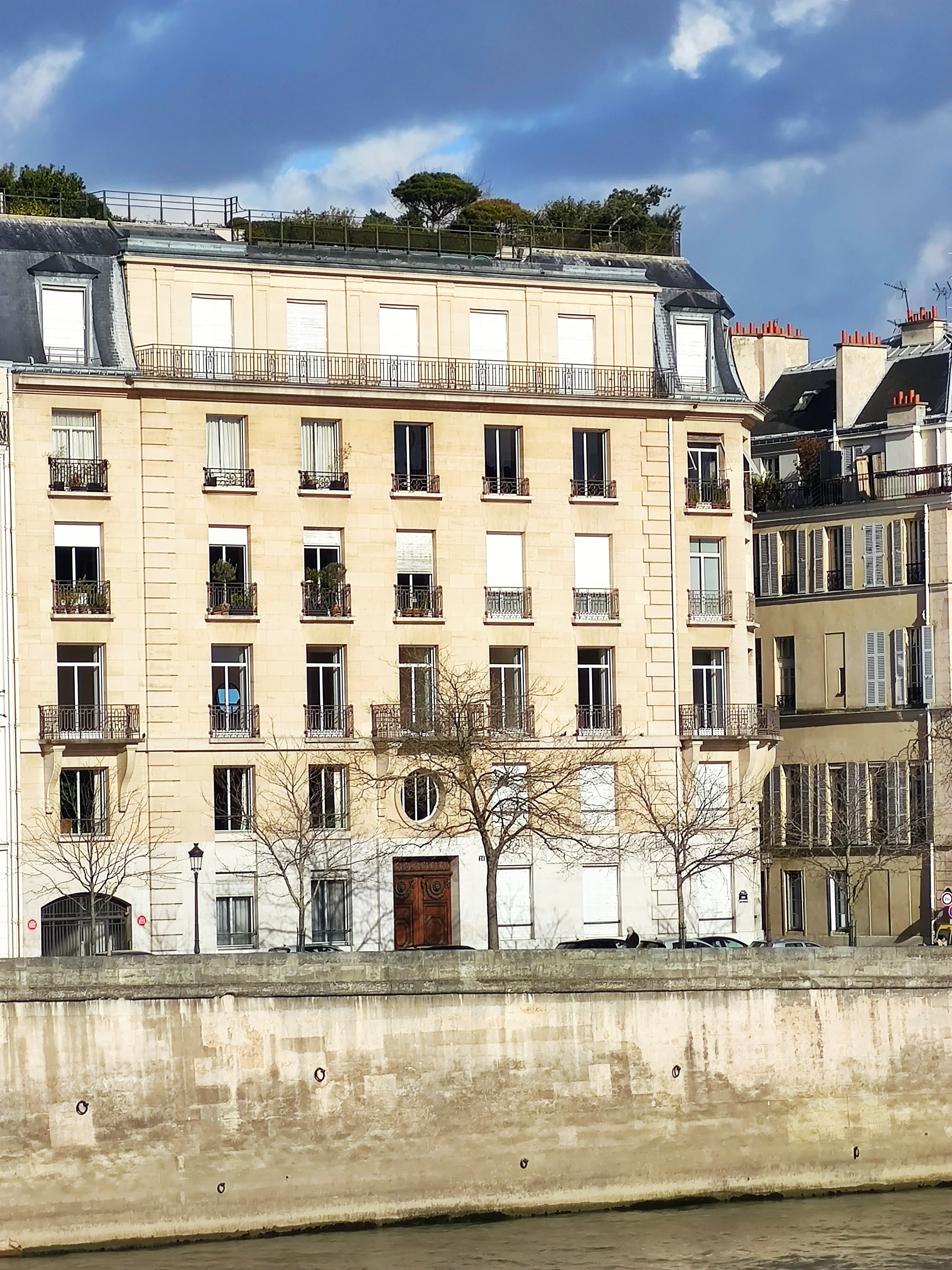
River façade

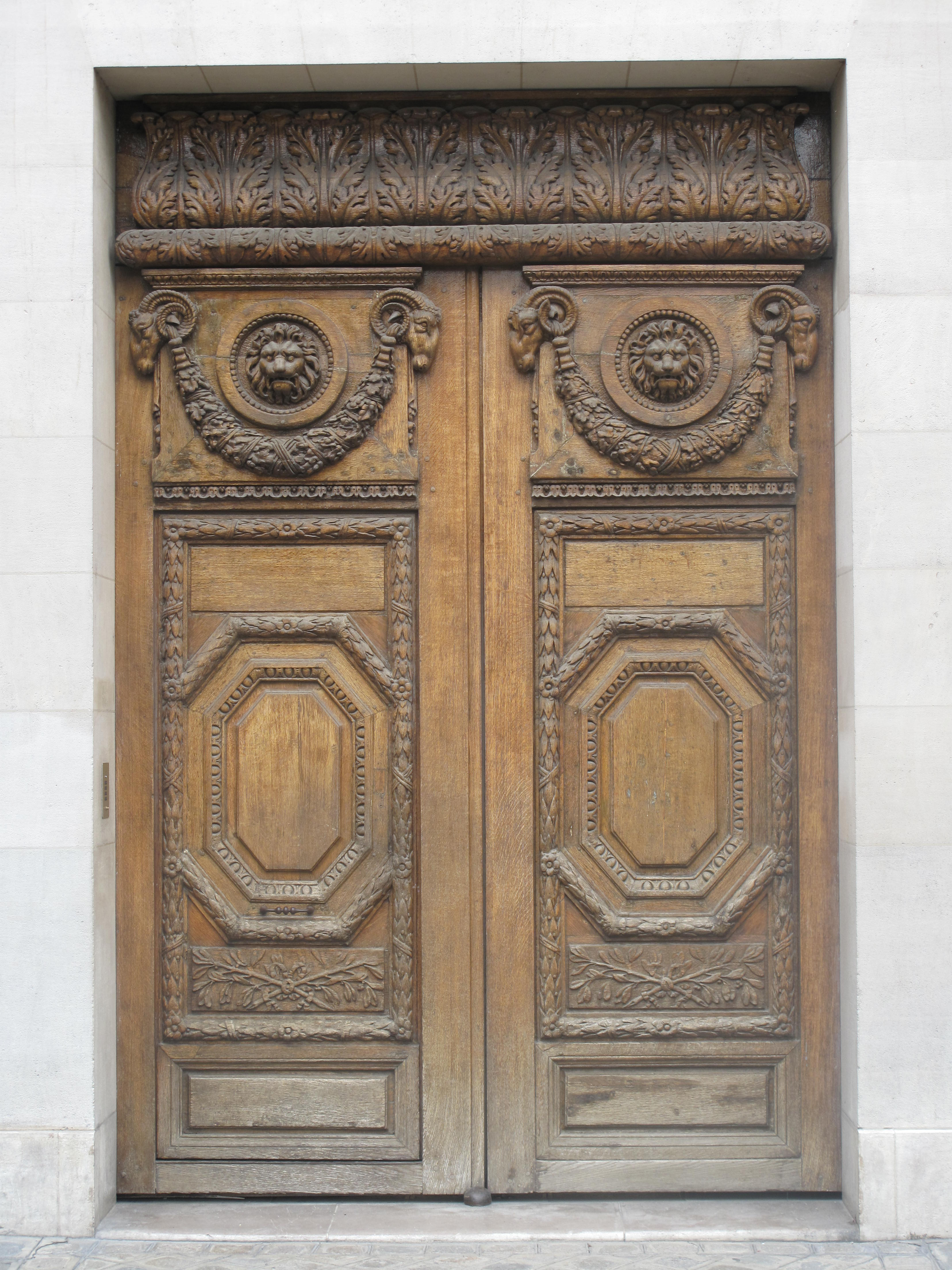
Le Hongre's doors

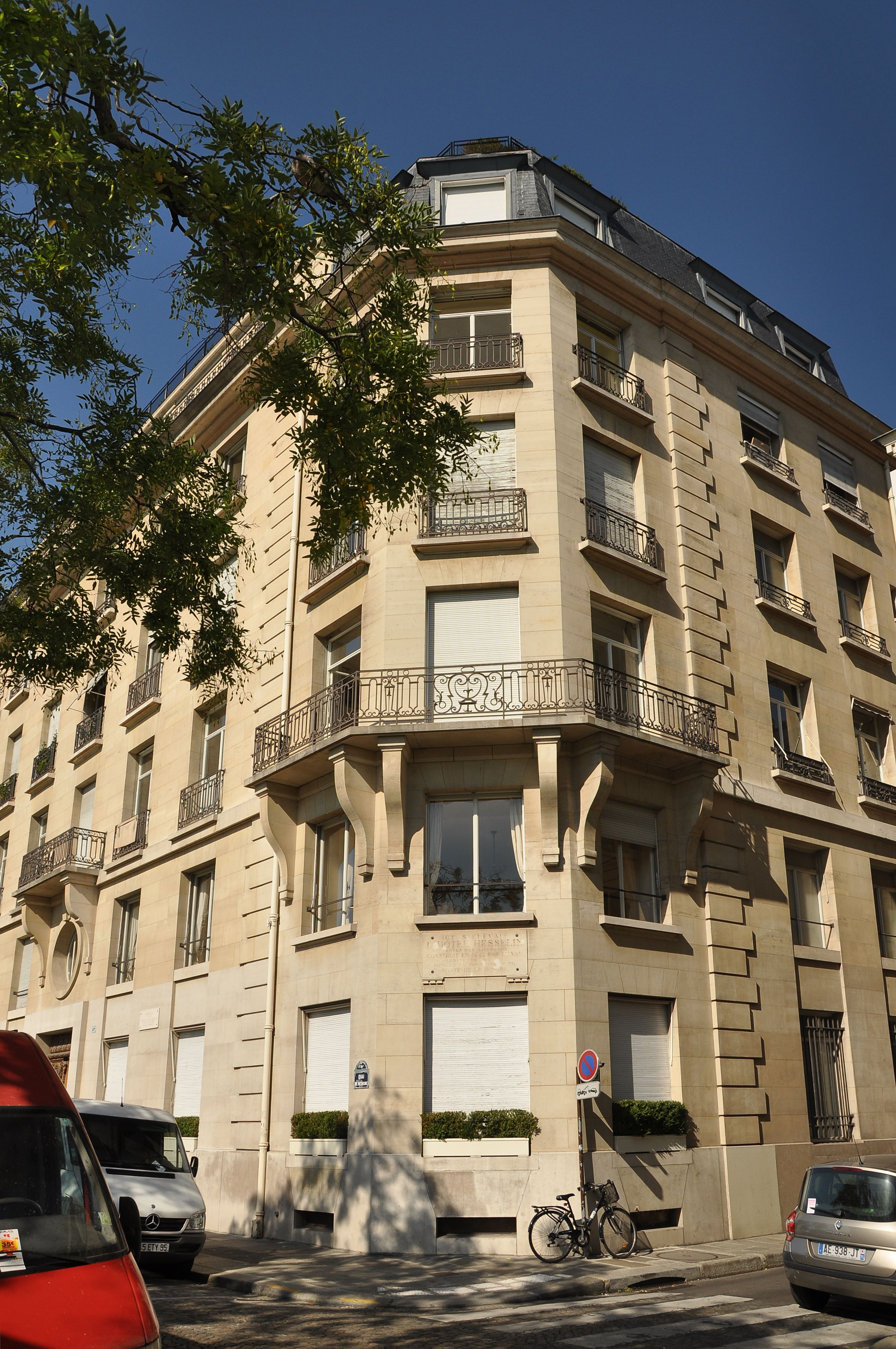
Southeast corner

== Bibliography ==
- Blunt, Anthony (1953). Art and Architecture in France 1500 to 1700. Harmondsworth, Middlesex: Penguin Books. OCLC 1019966574.
- Bordier, Cyril (1998). Louis Le Vau, Architecte: Les immeubles et hôtels particuliers parisiens. Paris: Librairie Léonce Laget. ISBN 9782852041196.
- Cojannot, Alexandre (2012). Louis Le Vau et les nouvelles ambitions de l'architecture française 1612–1654. Paris: Picard. ISBN 9782708409361.
- Deutsch, Kristina (2015). Jean Marot : Un graveur d'architecture à l'époque de Louis XIV. Berlin: De Gruyter. ISBN 9783110375954.
- Fitoussi, Michèle (2012). Helena Rubinstein, the Woman Who Invented Beauty, translated from French by Kate Bignold and Lakshmi Ramakrishnan Iyer. London: Gallic Books. ISBN 9781908313461. First published in 2010 as Helena Rubinstein : La femme qui inventa la beauté. Paris: Bernard Grasset. ISBN 9782246755715.
