= Roberta Invernizzi =

Italian soprano (born 1966)

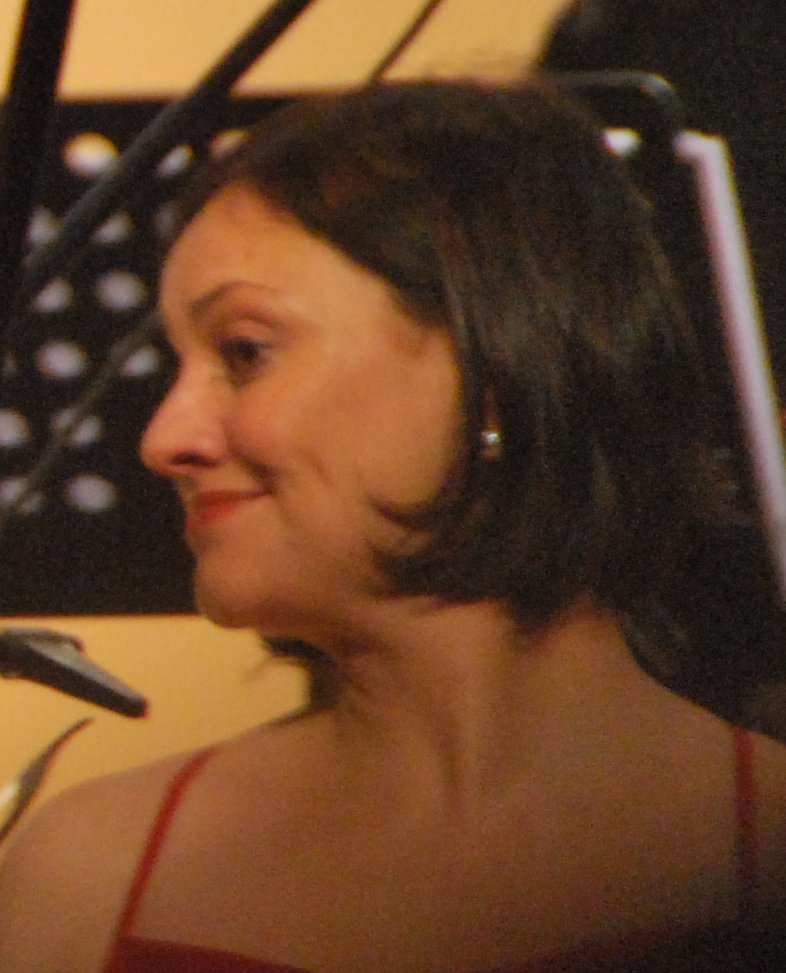
Roberta Invernizzi

Roberta Invernizzi (born 1966, in Milan) is an Italian soprano. She originally studied piano and double bass before turning to singing. She specialises in early music from the baroque and classical period of music.

She has sung in many operas in Italy, wider Europe and the US and has made over 60 recordings. Her recording of Handel's Cantate per il Cardinal Pamphili won the 2007 Stanley Sadie Handel Recording Prize.

In January 1999 she was invited by Gustav Leonhardt to sing in the inaugural concert of the New York Collegium.

Invernizzi currently teaches singing at the Centro di Musica Antica in Naples.

== Discography ==
- Boccherini: "Stabat Mater" (Roberta Invernizzi, L'Archiburdelli, Anner Bylsma) Sony Vivarte 2003
- Handel: Le Cantate per il Cardinal Pamphili (Roberta Invernizzi, La Risonanza, Fabio Bonizzoni) Glossa Music 2006
- Handel: Rodrigo (Gloria Banditelli, Sandrine Piau, Elena Cecchi Fedi, Rufus Müller, Roberta Invernizzi, Caterina Calvi; Il Complesso Barocco; Alan Curtis, conductor) Virgin Classics 7243 5 45897 2 0
- Handel: Floridante (Sharon Rostorf-Zamir (Rossane), Roberta Invernizzi (Timante), Joyce DiDonato (Elmira), Marijana Mijanovic (Floridante), Riccardo Novaro (Coralbo), Vito Priante (Oronte), Il complesso barocco, c. Alan Curtis. Deutschegrammophon DG 00289 477 6566
- Stradella: Moro per amore - Mark Beasley; Marco Lazzara; Roberta Invernizzi; Riccardo Ristori; Silvia Piccollo; Alessandro Stradella Consort; Estevan Velardi (conductor). Label: Bongiovanni GB 2153
- Stradella: Esule dalle sfere - Roberta Invernizzi; Marco Lazzara; Riccardo Ristori; Mario Nuvoli; Alessandro Stradella Consort; Estevan Velardi (conductor). Label: Bongiovanni GB 2165
- Porpora: Dorindo dormi ancor? - Rosita Frisani; Marco Lazzara; Roberta Invernizzi; Alessandro Stradella Consort; Estevan Velardi (conductor). Label: Bongiovanni GB 2181
- Gasparini: The Gasparini Album (Roberta Invernizzi, Auser Musici, Carlo Ipata) Glossa Music, GCD 922905, 2018
