= Doriclea (Stradella) =

La Doriclea is a 1672 opera in three acts by Alessandro Stradella, first performed in Rome. It was Stradella's first opera. The libretto is probably by the Roman aristocrat and scholar Flavio Orsini. Giovanni Filippo Apolloni may also have been involved. The manuscript score was lost, rediscovered in 1938, then lost again until its recent re-discovery. According to Brian Robins, writing in the British magazine Opera, the libretto "is a brilliantly sardonic and sharply observed depiction of the vicissitudes and pleasures of love as seen through the joys and misadventures of three couples."

The first modern performance was on 8 May 2004 at the Fifth Festival Luci e Tintinnii at the Teatro dei Varii in Colle di Val d'Elsa, a semi-staged production by the Alessandro Stradella Consort conducted by Estevan Velardi. A recording was made, but the conductor Velardi and the record producer Concerto Classics failed to obtain the necessary rights for wide release from the diocesan archive of Rieti, the owner of the manuscript score. In 2017, a double ruling by the Civil Court of Rome awarded the rights to the Arcana company and conductor Andrea De Carlo. The latter conducted a semi-staged performance on 2 September 2017 in the Auditorium Parco della Musica in Rome, as part of the Festival Barocco Alessandro Stradella, and recorded it immediately thereafter. As of 2022, both recordings are available as digital downloads.

== Roles ==
- Doriclea, lover of Fidalbo; later disguised as Lindoro (soprano)
- Fidalbo, lover of Doriclea (alto)
- Lucinda, noblewoman, lover of Celindo (soprano)
- Celindo, nobleman, lover of Lucinda (tenor)
- Delfina, older woman of lower rank (alto)
- Giraldo, manservant to Lucinda (bass)

== Recordings ==
- 2004: La Doriclea, Rosita Frisani (Doriclea), Gianluca Belfiori Doro (Fidalbo), Cristina Jannicola (Lucinda), Carlo Putelli (Celindo), Linda Campanella (Delfina), Vito Priante (Giraldo), Alessandro Stradella Consort, conducted by Estévan Velardi. 4 CDs: Concerto Classics CNT 2102-4. Duration: 252 minutes 42 seconds. Online version (2022).
- 2017: La Doriclea, Emőke Baráth (Doriclea), Giuseppina Bridelli (Lucinda), Gabriella Martellacci (Delfina), Xavier Sabata (Fidalbo), Luca Cervoni (Celindo), Riccardo Novaro (Giraldo), Il Pomo d'Oro, conducted by Andrea De Carlo. Recorded at the Scuderie Farnese [Farnese Stables] (at the Villa Farnese), Caprarola, Viterbo, Italy, 3-9 September 2017; 3 CDs: Arcana A 454. Duration: 188 minutes. Online version (2018).
