= Marco Lazzara =

Italian countertenor (born 1962)

Marco Lazzara (born 1962) is an Italian countertenor who sings a wide-ranging repertoire from baroque composers to those of the 20th century and has performed in a number of notable premieres and revivals of rarely performed operas. He has recorded widely on the Bongiovanni, Ricordi, Nuova Era, Forlane, Opera Rara and Dynamic labels.

== Career ==
Lazzara received diplomas in piano, organ, harpsichord and singing, followed by studies at the Accademia Musicale Chigiana in Siena, and made his professional debut in 1989. In the field of baroque music, Lazzara has sung as a leading soloist with the Alessandro Stradella Consort in a series of performances and world premiere recordings, including, Stradella's Il barcheggio, Moro per amore, and Esule dalle sfere and Nicola Porpora's Dorindo dormi ancor? on the Bongiovanni label. He also appears in the world premiere recording of Niccolò Piccinni's Salve Regina and Dixit Dominus on Bongiovanni. Lazzara was the first countertenor to sing the role of Orfeo in Gluck's Orfeo ed Euridice in Italy with a series of 1996 performances in Mantua, Pisa and Ravenna. In 2001, he sang the title role of Antonio Cesti's Il Tito in its first modern revival since 1983. The production at the Opéra national du Rhin in Strasbourg with William Christie and Les Arts Florissants premiered a newly edited score by music scholar Alan Curtis.

In the bel canto repertoire, Lazzara sang the role of Lurcanio in Simon Mayr's Ginevra di Scozia in a series of performances (and world premiere recording) in April 2001 at the Teatro Lirico Giuseppe Verdi in Trieste to mark the bicentenary of the opera's premiere and its first performance in modern times. Lazzara has also recorded an album of arias and duets by Rossini with Annick Massis (Duo d'amore) on the Forlane label, and a solo album of arias and songs by Bellini on the Dynamic label. The latter contains the first recording of Francesco Florimo's "Tu che al pianger" based on a theme from Bellini's La straniera.

Lazzara's performances in 20th century works include the role of Edgar in the Italian premiere of Aribert Reimann's Lear at the Teatro Regio di Torino in October 2001; Manichino di Donna in the world premiere of Azio Corghi's Il Dissoluto Assolto at the Teatro Nacional de São Carlos, Lisbon, in March 2006 (reprised for its Italian premiere at La Scala the following September); Il delegato in the world premiere of Bruno de Franceschi's Il paradiso degli esuli (Pisa, 27 October 1994); and Sesto Simbolo in the world premiere of Adriano Guarnieri's Pietra di diaspro at the Teatro dell'Opera di Roma on 10 June 2007 (reprised for the Ravenna Festival later that year). Lazzara has also performed as a soloist in Giacomo Manzoni's Trame d'Ombre (Webs of Shadows) at Carnegie Hall (April 2000) and in the first Italian performance of Alfred Schnittke's cantata based on the Faust legend, Seid nüchtern und wachet. The latter performance was broadcast live by RAI Radio 3 on 22 April 2007. He will be present in Schnittke's Faust cantata in September 2012 at the Salle Pleyel in Paris, with Vladimir Fedoseyev conducting.

== Discography ==
- Bellini: Arias – Marco Lazzara (countertenor), Angela Castellarin (piano). Label: Dynamic 271
- Vivaldi: Cantatas – Marco Lazzara (countertenor), Orchestra da Camera di Genova, Antonio Plotino (conductor). Label: Dynamic 222
- Mayr: Ginevra di Scozia – Elizabeth Vidal (soprano); Daniela Barcellona (mezzo-soprano); Antonio Siragusa (tenor); Luca Grassi (baritone); Giuseppina Piunti (soprano); Marco Lazzara (countertenor); Orchestra del Teatro Verdi di trieste; Tiziano Severini (conductor). Label: Opera Rara ORC23
- Scarlatti: Abramo, il tuo sembiante (Christmas cantata) – Marco Lazzara (countertenor); Giovanni Dagnino (bass); Silvia Piccollo (soprano); The Stradella Consort; Esteban Velardi (conductor). Label: Nuova Era 7117
- Duo d'amore (arias and duets by Rossini) – Marco Lazzara (countertenor); Annick Massis (soprano); Orchestra della Svizzera Italiana; Enrique Mazzola (conductor). Label: Forlane 16807
- Stradella: Il barcheggio – Valentina Valente (soprano); Marco Lazzara (countertenor); Giovanni Dagnino (bass); Alessandro Stradella Consort; Estevan Velardi (conductor) Label: Bongiovanni GB 2102
- Stradella: Moro per amore – Mark Beasley (tenor); Marco Lazzara (countertenor); Roberta Invernizzi (soprano); Riccardo Ristori (bass); Silvia Piccollo (soprano); Alessandro Stradella Consort; Estevan Velardi (conductor). Label: Bongiovanni GB 2153
- Stradella: Esule dalle sfere – Roberta Invernizzi (soprano); Marco Lazzara (countertenor); Riccardo Ristori (bass); Mario Nuvoli (tenor); Alessandro Stradella Consort; Estevan Velardi (conductor). Label: Bongiovanni GB 2165
- Porpora: Dorindo dormi ancor? – Rosita Frisani (soprano); Marco Lazzara (countertenor); Roberta Invernizzi (soprano); Alessandro Stradella Consort; Estevan Velardi (conductor). Label: Bongiovanni GB 2181
- Piccinni: Salve Regina and Dixit Dominus – Maria Luigia Borsi (soprano); Marco Lazzara (countertenor); Elena Cecchi Fedi (soprano); Gregory Bonfatti (tenor); Cappella S. Cecilia della Cattedrale di Lucca; Orchestra Città Lirica; Gianfranco Cosmi (conductor). Label: Bongiovanni GB 2338
- Fabio Vacchi: Luoghi immaginari – Marco Lazzara (countertenor); EnsembleMusica20; Guido Maria Guida, Mauro Bonifacio (conductors). Label: Ricordi/BMG CRMCD 1043
