= Erismena =

Opera by Francesco Cavalli

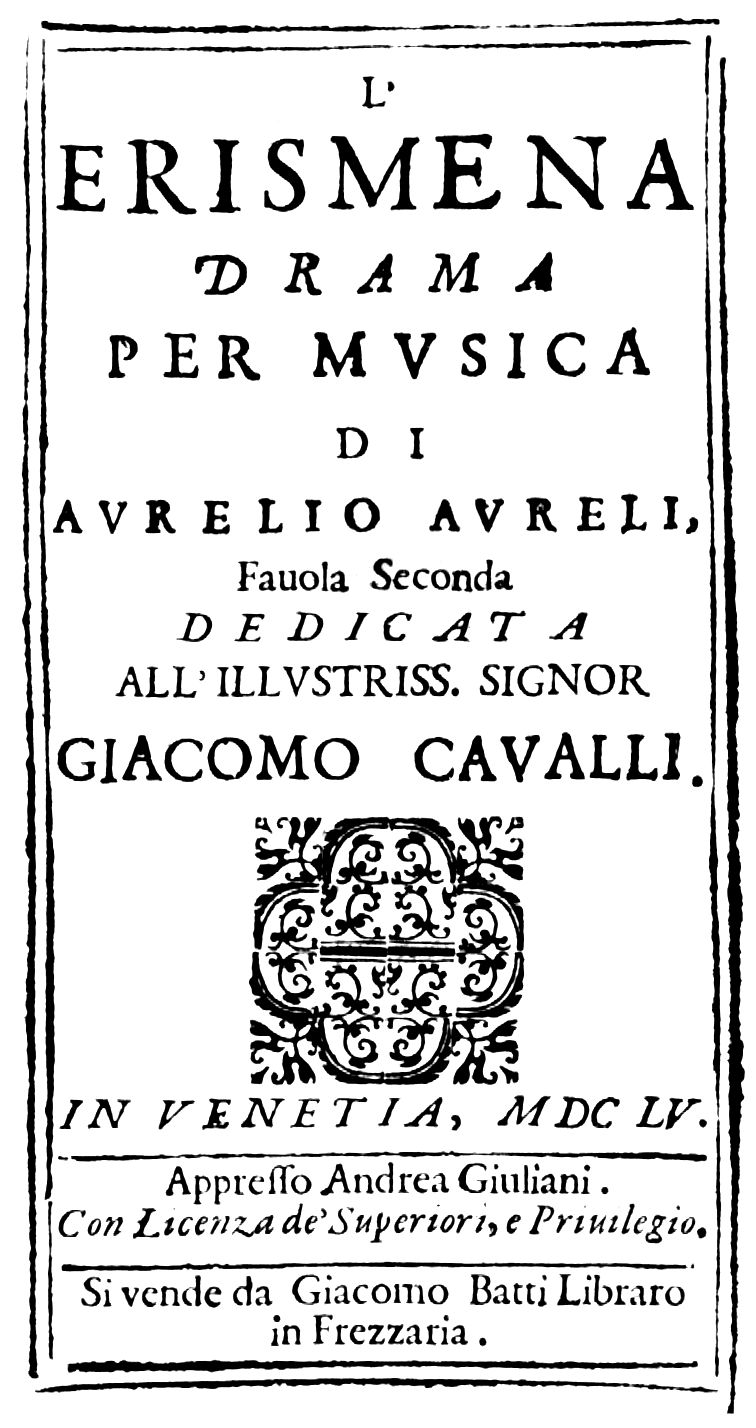
Title page of libretto

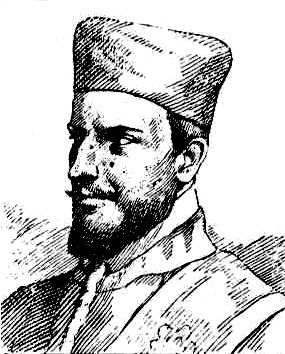
Francesco Cavalli

Erismena is an opera in a prologue and three acts by Francesco Cavalli. First performed in Venice in 1655, it was designated as a dramma per musica.

== Libretto ==
The Italian libretto was by Aurelio Aureli, the only work by this writer for Cavalli. It was dedicated to Giacomo Cavalli (1617-1674), one of the sons of Federico Cavalli (1567-1618), benefactor of the composer. The work is also unusual for having been translated into English in the 17th century. Erismena is the first full-length opera known to have been translated into English and may have been first performed in England in 1674.

== Performance history ==
The performance history indicates that the opera was well received. It was first performed in Venice at the Teatro Sant'Apollinare on 30 December 1655 with further performances between that date and 28 February 1656. Cavalli revised the work in 1670. Both versions have survived as well as one with an English translation, also dated to the 17th century.

== Roles ==
Role	Voice type	Premiere Cast, 30 December 1655 (Conductor: - )
Erimante, King of Media	bass	
Erismena, daughter of Erimante	soprano	
Aldimira, favourite of Erimante	soprano	
Alcesta, Aldimira's former nurse	contralto	
Idraspe (Erineo), Prince of Iberia	contralto	
Orimeno, Prince of Colchus	soprano	
Agrippo, servant of Orimeno	bass	
Diarte, a prison guard	bass	
Clerio	soprano	
Flerida	soprano	
Oriste	bass	

== Score ==
Many opera scores by Cavalli have survived among the manuscripts of Venice's Biblioteca Marciana. According to Grove, there are two versions of Erismena in the Marciana, the later one being an adaptation for a 1670 revival. There is another score in the Bodleian Library, Oxford.

While the libretto was published in 1655, the score was not published until 2018 when Bärenreiter edition appeared, based on one of the Marciana scores. The volume also includes the English version which uses the Bodleian score.

== The 'English 'Version' ==
A manuscript score of Erismena, with English underlay, is the oldest surviving opera score in England, dating from the 1670s. The score was in a private library until 2008. A public subscription raised £85,000 to purchase the score for the Bodleian Library, Oxford, after its exporthad been blocked by the British Reviewing Committee on the Export of Works of Art.

The manuscript has a unique allegorical prologue, with characters who do not feature in the opera; this is believed to indicate that the version was performed, or intended to be performed, for a Royal audience.

A version of the English score was given by Alan Curtis who recorded it in 1968 (see below). Another one, this time by Lionel Salter, was staged by the Edinburgh University Opera Club in 1989. In the 21st century, a version of the opera was performed by English Touring Opera, and by Leonardo García Alarcón and the Cappella Mediterranea for the Festival d'Aix-en-Provence. In 2010, New Chamber Opera staged the work using a new edition of the original English score which ultimately appeared in the Bärenreiter Edition of Cavalli's Collected Works; a season of performances was given by the Company in Oxford, and others in the opera season at West Green House.

== Recordings ==
- Pier Francesco Cavalli: L'Erismena Sung in English. Oakland Symphony Orchestra; Conductor: Alan Curtis. Principal singers: Walt McKibben (Alcesta), Carole Bogard (Aldimira), Edward Jameson (Argippo), Leslie Retallick (Clerio), Edgar Jones (Diark), Walter Matthes (Erimante), Delreen Hafenrichter (Erismena), Holly Alonso (Flerida), Melvin Brown (Idraspe), Paul Esswood (Orimeno) Recording date: 1968 Label: Vox - SVBX 5213 (LPs)
- Cavalli: Erismena Sung in Italian. There is a live video recording of the 2017 production for the Festival D'Aix-en-Provence with Leonardo García Alarcón and the Cappella Mediterranea, starring sopranos Francesca Aspromonte and Susanna Hurrell, countertenors Carlo Vistoli and Jakub Jósef Orlinski, and baritone Alexander Miminoshvili. There is a full version available on YouTube.
- Atto I Scena 4: "Speranze voi che siete" Scena 5 "O stelle, a che mi sforzate" "A me il veleno" Cappella Mediterranea, Leonardo García Alarcón, Thomas Dunford, Sarah Van Oudenhove, Mariana Flores 2014
