= La canterina =

Opera buffa by Joseph Haydn

- Opera buffa by Joseph Haydn
- Portrait of the composer by Thomas Hardy, in 1791
- Language: Italian
- Premiere: 1766; Eszterháza

La canterina (The Songstress or The Diva), Hob. XXVIII/2, is a short, two-act opera buffa by Joseph Haydn, the first one he wrote for Prince Esterhazy. Based on the intermezzo from the third act of Niccolò Piccinni's opera L'Origille (1760), it lasts about 50 minutes. It was written in 1766, and was premiered in the summer of that year.

It was originally intended as a pair of intermezzi, each of the two acts coming between the acts of an opera seria. Similar works include La serva padrona by Pergolesi and Pimpinone by Telemann.

== Roles ==
Roles, voice types, premiere cast
Role	Voice type	Premiere cast, 11 September 1766 / 16 February 1767
Don Ettore	soprano (en travesti)	Barbara Fux-Dichtler
Apollonia	tenor (en travesti)	Leopold Dichtler
Don Pelagio	tenor	Karl Friberth
Gasparina	soprano	Anna Maria Weigl-Scheffstoss

== Synopsis ==
Gasparina, the songstress, and her mother, Apollonia, are visited by Don Ettore, a young man who attempts to woo Gasparina with fabric and jewels stolen from his mother. When Don Pelagio, Gasparina's singing instructor and benefactor, arrives, the women attempt to disguise Don Ettore as a merchant and send him away. Don Pelagio teaches Gasparina a new aria he has written for her and asks her to marry him.

When Don Pelagio leaves, Gasparina calls Don Ettore back in. Don Pelagio has left something behind, however, and returns to catch Gasparina and Don Ettore together. Don Pelagio and Don Ettore are both angry at having been deceived and taken advantage of by the women. Don Pelagio decides to throw the women out of their apartment, which he had given them, and begins to carry away their belongings.

Gasparina pleads for forgiveness and mercy, and Don Pelagio is swayed. Not only does he allow her to stay in the apartment, but he brings his own belongings to the women. Gasparina continues to take advantage of the situation, pretending to faint. The men lavish her with money and diamonds, which have a curiously restorative effect. In the end, the men recognize Gasparina's greed, but nonetheless willingly hand over their riches.

The comic potential is enhanced by Don Ettore being played as a Breeches role – that is, by a woman. The soprano role of Apollonia was originally sung by a man.

There are two quartets, and all characters but Don Ettore have arias to sing.

== Selected recordings ==
- 1994 – Joyce Guyer (Don Ettore), D'Anna Fortunato (Apollonia), John Garrison (Don Pelagio), Brenda Harris (Gasparina) – Palmer Chamber Orchestra, Rudolph Palmer (Newport Classic). Original CD release accompanied by Haydn's First Symphony and an attributed flute concerto.
- 1997 – József Mukk (Don Ettore), Andrea Ulbrich (Apollonia), Antal Pataki (Don Pelagio), Ingrid Kertesi (Gasparina) – Capella Savaria, Pál Németh (Hungaroton). Original CD release accompanied by Haydn's Symphony No. 35.
