= Pepusch =

Pepusch is a surname. Notable people with the surname include:

- Francesca Pepusch (c.1680–1746), Italian singer
- Johann Christoph Pepusch (1667–1752), German composer
