= Louis Hesselin =

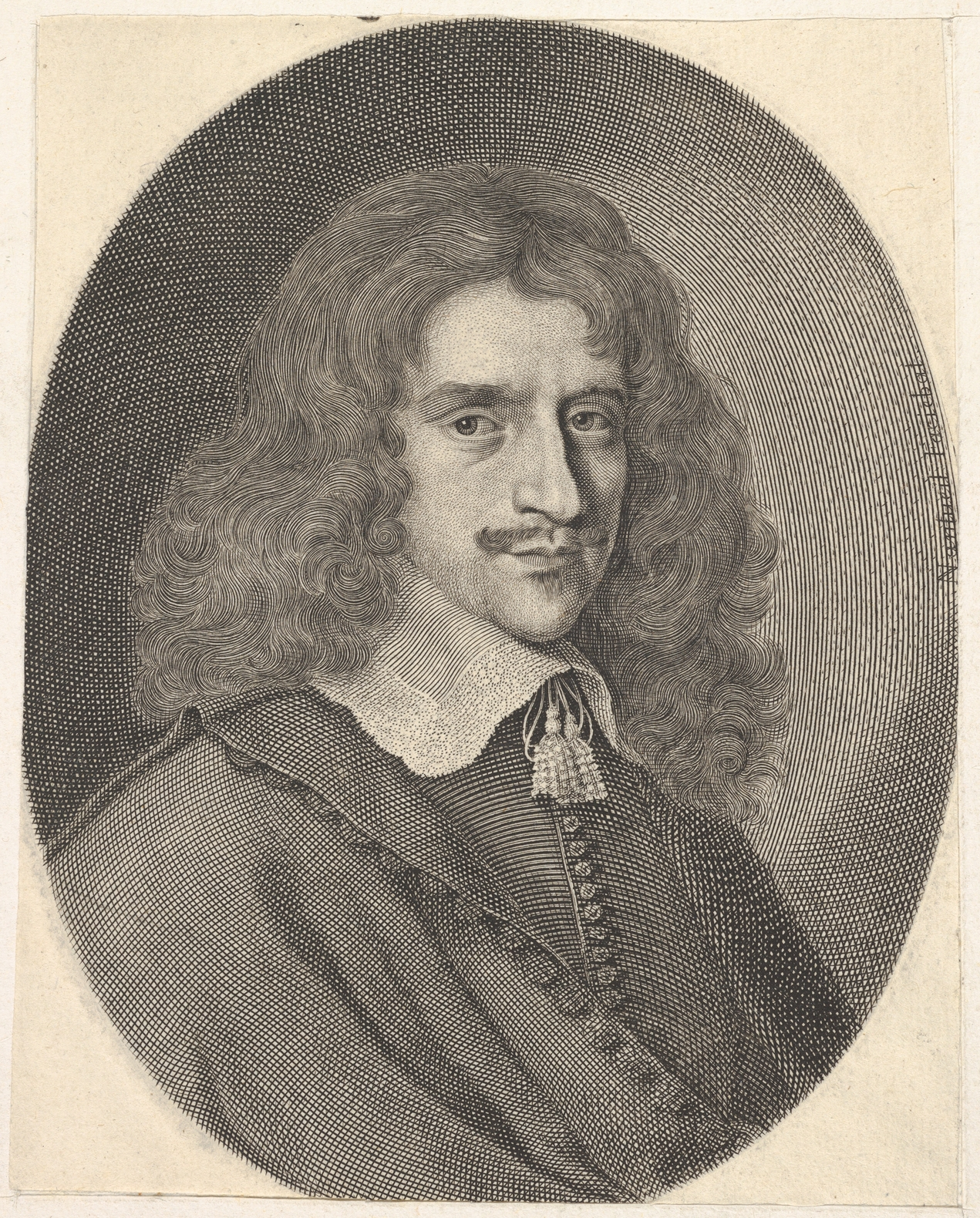
Louis Hesselin, c. 1650, engraved by Robert Nanteuil

Louis Hesselin, Seigneur de Condé (French pronunciation: [lwi ɛslɛ̃]; February 1602 – 8 August 1662) was a French aristocrat, government official, patron and collector. He held various positions in the royal household and became Intendant of the Menus Plaisirs around 1655.

== Ancestry, name, and early career ==
Louis Hesselin was born in Paris in the early days of February 1602 to a family of magistrates, originally from the Marne, but living in Paris for several generations. His father was Pierre Cauchon, Seigneur de Condé, and an auditor of the Chambre des Comptes. His mother was Elisabeth (or Isabelle) Morin. His father, who died sometime between 1609 and 1614, was the son of Thierry Cauchon and his second wife, Madeleine Brulart, daughter of Noël Brulart, procureur général au parlement. The first wife of Thierry Cauchon was Madeleine Hesselin, daughter of Paris, maître des comptes. Elisabeth Morin was the daughter of Mathurin Morin, Seigneur de la Planchette en Brie, and Marie Hesselin, sister of Madeleine Hesselin. Their brother, Louis Hesselin, who never married, treated his grandnephew like a son and by his will and testament (18 August 1620) left him his entire fortune, provided he change his name to Louis Hesselin. The latter signed his name Louis Hesselin as early as 1623 and regularised the change by lettres patentes, registered with parlement on 19 December 1626. Not long after, Louis Hesselin obtained the office of maître de la chambre aux deniers [Master of the Chamber of Funds]. In 1634 and 1638 he is recorded as conseiller du roi en ses conseils and maître d'hôtel ordinaire du roi, as well as maître de la chambre aux deniers.

== Trips to Italy ==
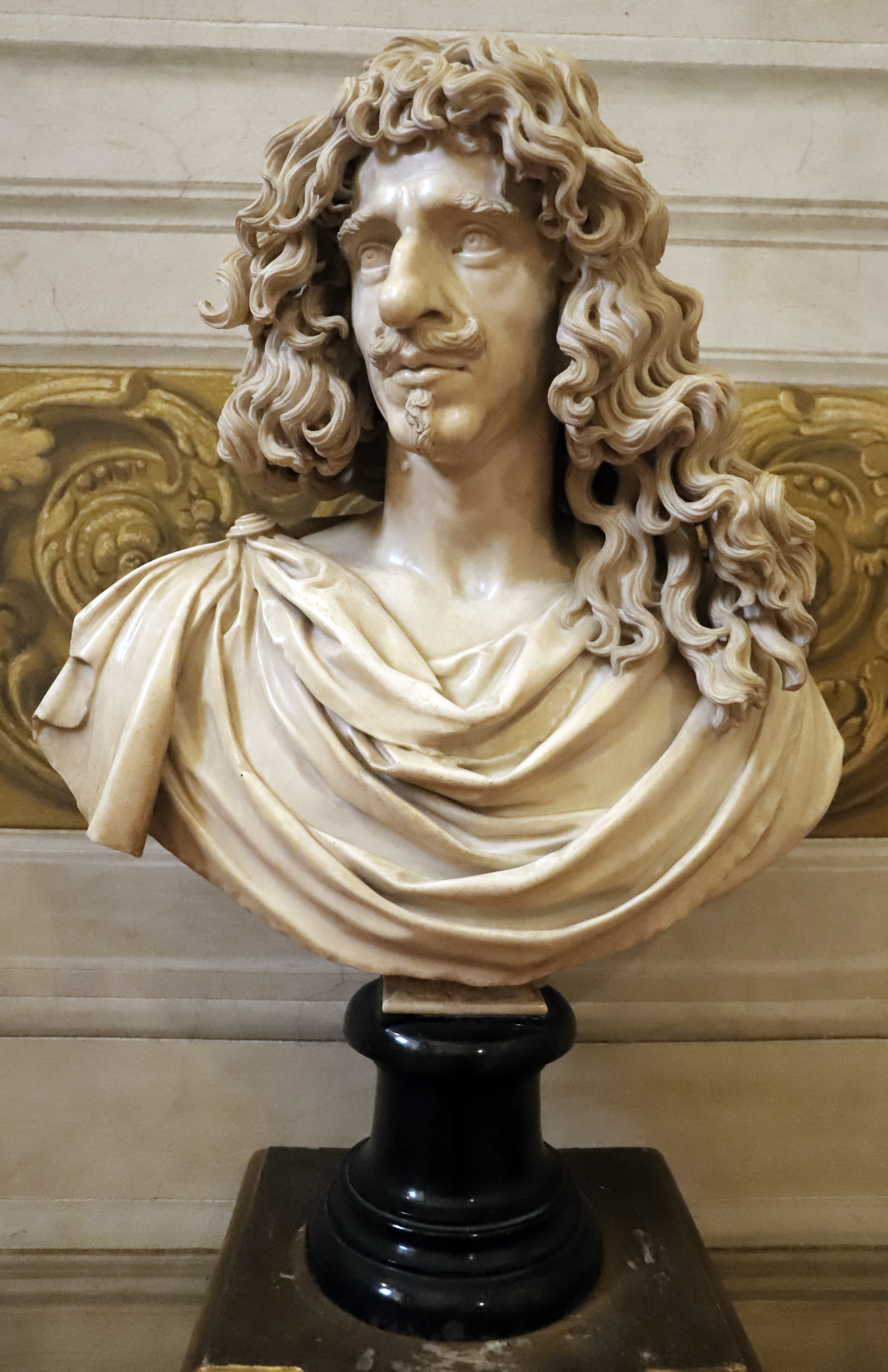
Louis Hesselin by Domenico Pieratti

Louis Hesselin took at least two extended trips to Italy in the 1630s: one in 1632–1633 and another in 1637. While there he may have taken the opportunity to acquire a large number of books, paintings, and objets d'art, documented much later in an inventory made after his death.

He was portrayed in a bust by Domenico Pieratti now in Florence, Pitti Palace.

== Residences ==
In the early 1640s Hesselin had the architect Louis Le Vau build him a house, the Hôtel Hesselin (demolished 1935), on the Île Saint-Louis in Paris. He also owned a country house, the Maison Chantemesle (in what is now the Parc Chantemerle), in Essonnes on the road between Paris and the Palace of Fontainebleau. At Chantemesle he entertained French royalty and foreign travelers, including John Evelyn in 1644 and Queen Christina of Sweden in 1656. In 1654 he purchased the Château de Saint-Sépulchre (later known as the Château de Villacerf) and had it rebuilt to designs by Louis Le Vau (and/or his younger brother, François Le Vau).

River facade of the Hôtel Hesselin (three-bay central pavilion and six-bay façade on the right)

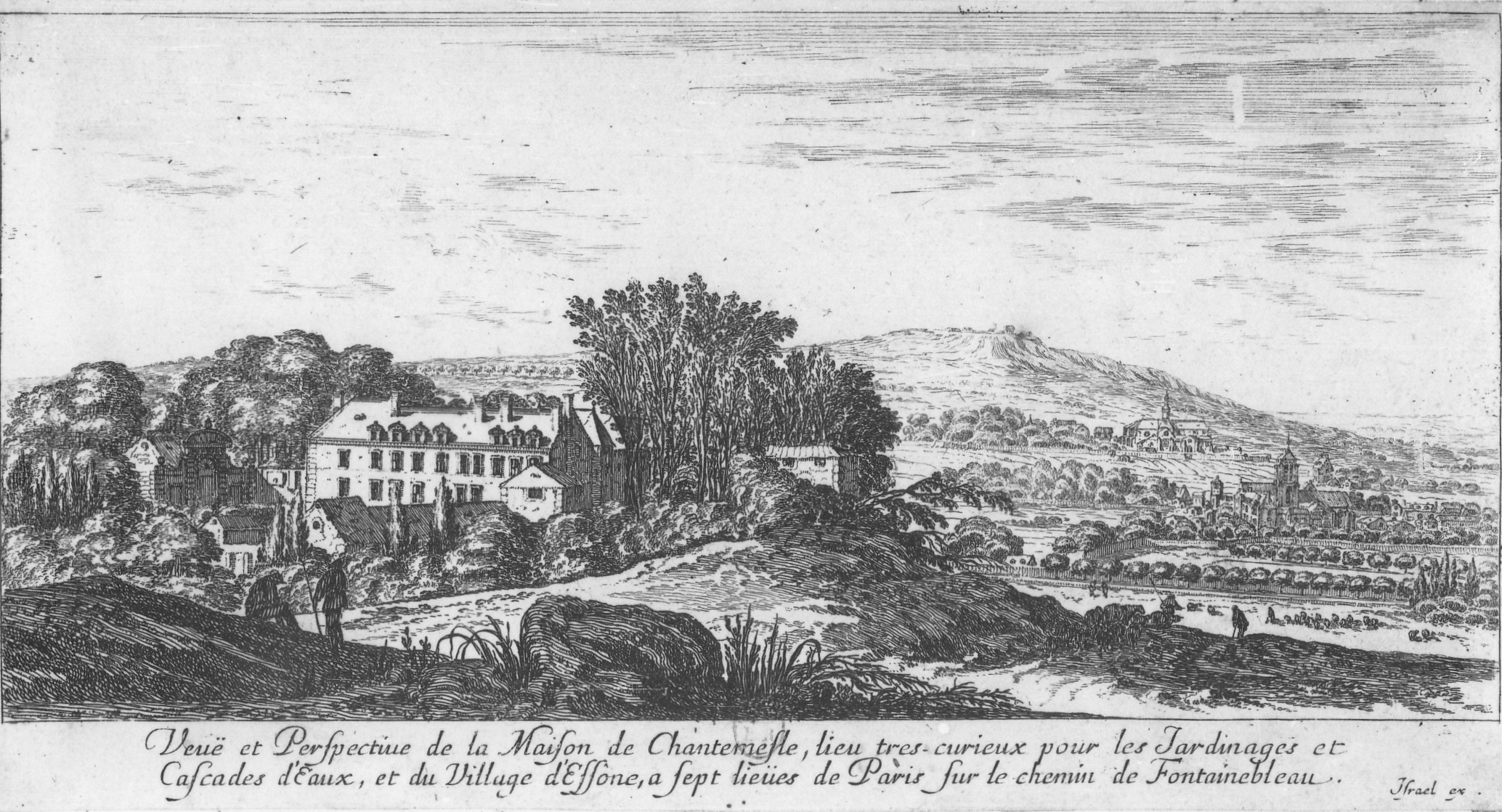
View of the Maison Chantemesle

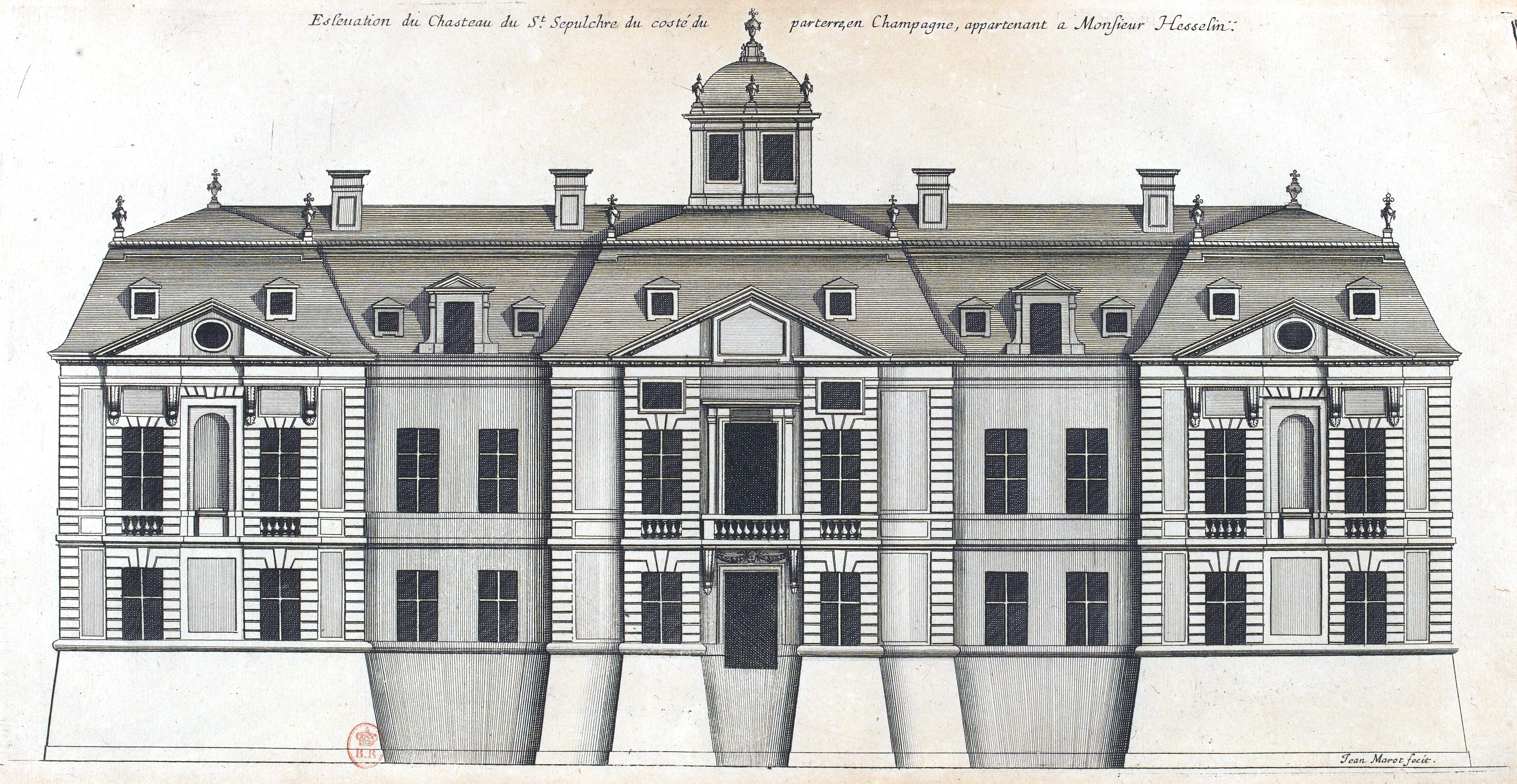
Garden façade of the Château de Saint-Sépulchre

== Bibliography ==
- Beresford, Richard (1996). "Hesselin, Louis (Cauchon)", vol. 14, p. 492, in The Dictionary of Art, 34 volumes, edited by Jane Turner, reprinted with minor corrections in 1998. London: Macmillan. ISBN 9781884446009.
- Berger, Robert W. (1993). The Palace of the Sun: The Louvre of Louis XIV. University Park: The Pennsylvania State University Press. ISBN 9780271008479.
- Crèvecœur, R. [Robert] de (1895). Louis Hesselin, amateur parisien, intendant des plaisirs du Roi. Paris. Copy at Gallica.
- Freddolini, Francesco (2016). "A Rediscovered Work by Domenico Pieratti: The Bust of Louis Hesselin", Mitteilungen des Kunsthistorisches Institutes in Florenz, vol. 58 (2016), no. 3, pp. 411–420. JSTOR 44634636.
- Weill-Courier, Moana (2011). "A propos de... Louis Hesselin". mweilcuriel.blogspot.com at Archive copy (3 March 2020).
