= Alessandro Stradella =

Italian composer (1643–1682)

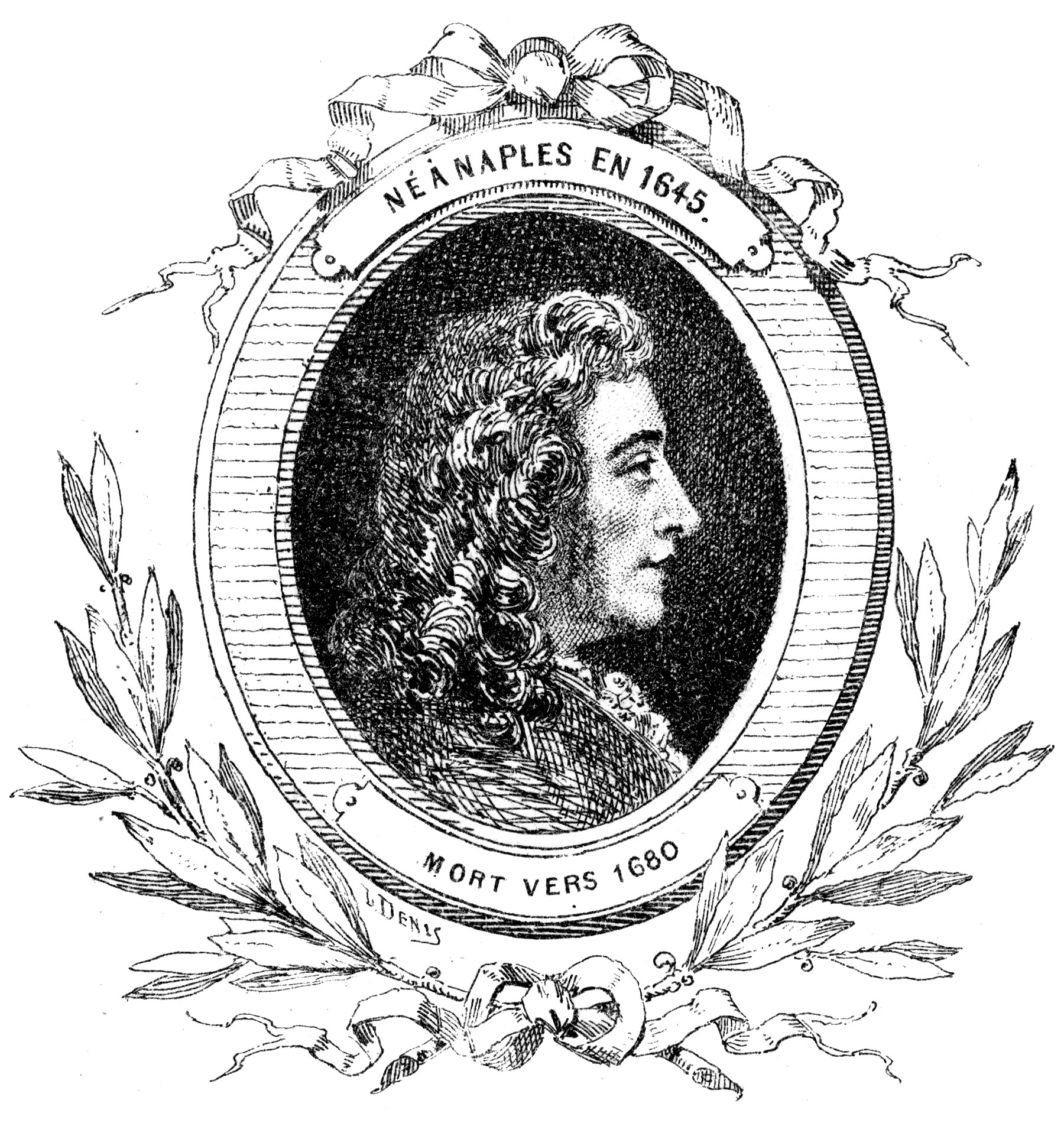
- Imaginary portrait of Stradella created in the latter half of the 19th century
- Born: Antonio Alessandro Boncompagno Stradella; 3 July 1643; Bologna, Papal States
- Died: 25 February 1682 (aged 38); Genoa, Republic of Genoa
- Occupation: Composer

Antonio Alessandro Boncompagno Stradella (Bologna, 3 July 1643 – Genoa, 25 February 1682) was an Italian composer of the middle Baroque period. He enjoyed a dazzling career as a freelance composer, writing on commission, and collaborating with distinguished poets, producing over three hundred works in a variety of genres.

== Life ==
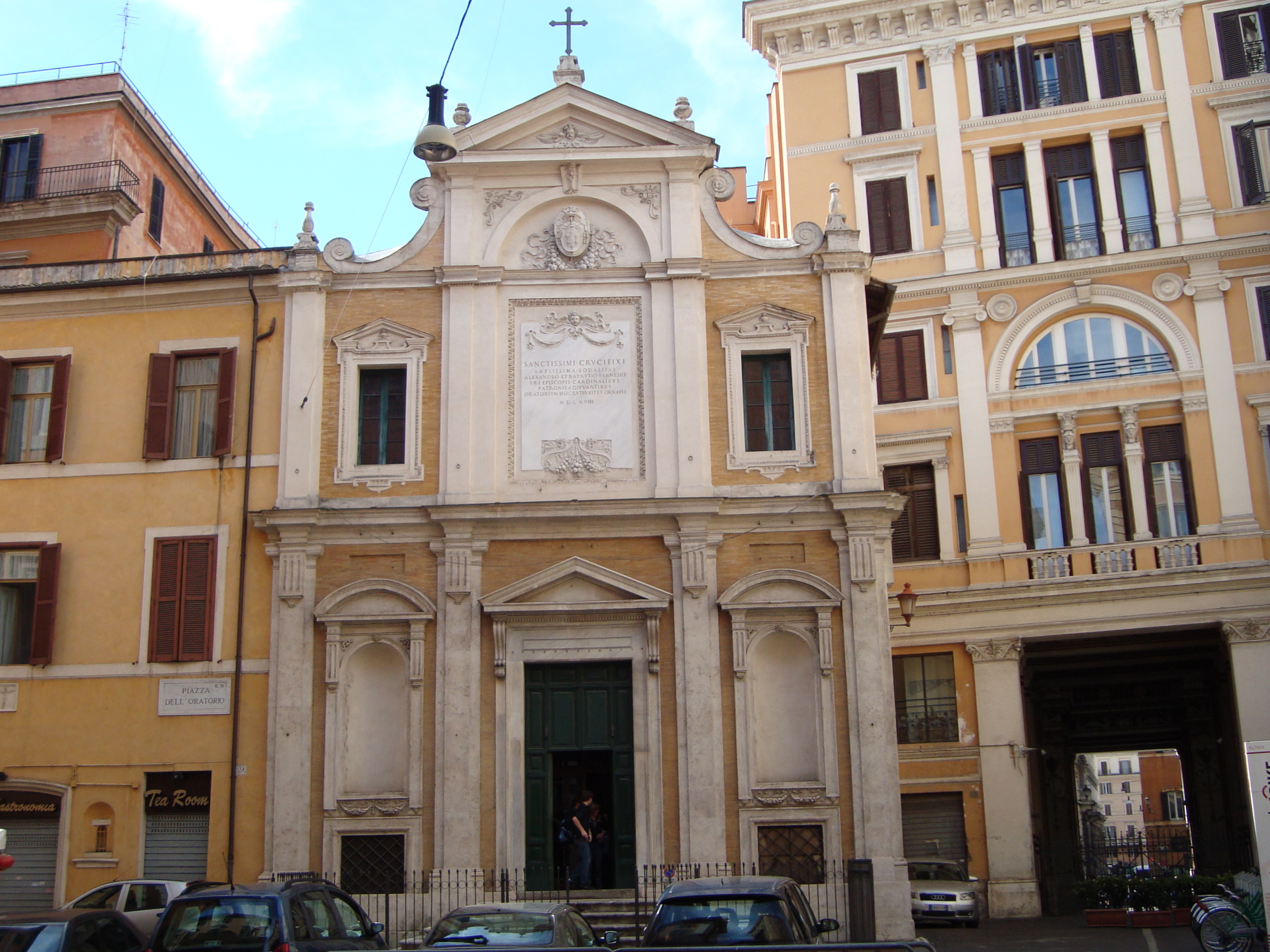
Oratory of Santissimo Crocifisso

Stradella was born in Bologna on 3 July 1643 to the aristocrats Marc'Antonio Stradella (1579-1649) from Nepi (in the province of Viterbo), and his second wife, Vittoria Bartoli from Orvieto, and baptised Antonio Alessandro Boncompagno Stradella on 1 August 1643 in Bologna. His godfather in proxy was Duke Ugo Boncompagni, who had appointed his father vice-marquis of Vignola on 7 June 1642. Although the family resided in Nepi, they were temporarily in Bologna, taking refuge from papal troops attacking Vignola.

He was educated at Rome, and was already making a name for himself as a composer at the age of 24. In 1667 he composed a Latin oratorio (lost) for the Confraternity of Crocifisso di San Marcello and in the following year the serenata La Circe for the Princess of Rossano Olimpia Aldobrandini Pamphilj. In 1671–72 he collaborated in staging some operas, two by Francesco Cavalli and two by Antonio Cesti, at the Tordinona Theater, composing prologues, intermedios and new arias. In the early 1670s, he also composed some operas performed in private theatres of aristocratic families.

Stradella began to live a dissolute life. With Carlo Ambrogio Lonati he attempted to embezzle money from the Roman Catholic Church, but was found out: he fled the city, only returning much later when he thought it was safe. His numerous incautious affairs with women began to make him enemies among the powerful men of the city, and he had to leave Rome for good.

In 1677 he went to Venice, where he was hired by a powerful nobleman, Alvise Contarini, as the music tutor to his mistress, Agnese Van Uffele. She and Stradella began an affair and fled Venice together for Turin, where they were protected by Marie Jeanne Baptiste of Savoy-Nemours, the regent of Savoy. Contarini followed and instructed the Archbishop that Uffele and Stradella must marry or that Uffele must take the veil. She did the latter, and then the two married in October; however, as Stradella left the convent after signing the contract, he was attacked from behind on 10 October by two would-be-hired assassins, who believed him dead when they left him in the street. He survived and the two assassins took asylum with the French ambassador. That Contarini had hired the attackers became known, leading to complaints from the regent of Savoy to Louis XIV; the matter became a topic of negotiation between the courts. In 1678 Stradella fled to Genoa, where he met again with Lonati. He was paid to compose operas performed at Falcone Theatre and music for the local nobility.

== Murder ==
In 1682, Stradella was stabbed to death at the Piazza Banchi in Genoa. A nobleman of the Lomellini family hired the assassin which put an end to Stradella's life, although the identity of the killer was never discovered. Another report of his murderers states: "Stradella was murdered at Genoa by three brothers of the name of Lomellini, whose sister he had seduced". Stradella was buried in the Santa Maria delle Vigne.

== Work ==
Stradella was an extremely influential composer at the time, though his fame was eclipsed in the next century by Corelli, Vivaldi and others. Some of his music was exploited by George Frideric Handel, for example in Israel in Egypt. Probably his greatest significance is in originating the concerto grosso: while Corelli in his Op. 6 was the first to publish works under this title, Stradella clearly uses the format earlier in one of his Sonate di viole. Since the two knew each other, a direct influence is likely.

Stradella wrote at least six baroque operas including a full-length comic opera Il Trespolo tutore. He also wrote more than 170 cantatas, at least one of which was based on a poem by Sebastiano Baldini, and six oratorios. Stradella composed 27 separate instrumental pieces, most for strings and basso continuo, and typically in the sonata da chiesa format.

He wrote two cantatas for the regent of Savoy, Se del pianeta ardente and Sciogliete i dolci nodi.

=== Operas ===
- La Doriclea (1672)
- Amare e Fingere (1676)
- La forza dell'amor paterno (1678)
- Il Trespolo tutore (1679)
- Le gare dell'amor eroico (1679)
- Moro per amore (1681)
- La Rosaura (premiered 1688)
- Il Corispero

=== Oratorios ===
- Santa Editta, vergine e monaca, regina d'Inghilterra (Rome c. 1672–73)
- Ester liberatrice del popolo ebreo (Rome c 1673)
- San Giovanni Battista (Rome, 1675)
- Susanna (Modena, 1681)
- San Giovanni Chrisostomo
- Santa Pelagia

=== Serenatas ===
- La Circe (1668)
- La Circe (second version)
- Il Duello ("Vola, vola, in alti petti") (1674)
- Lo schiavo liberato (1674)
- La forza delle stelle or Il Damone ("Or che il mondo ristaura") (1677)
- Il Barcheggio (1681)

== Legacy ==
His colourful life and his bloody death ordered by the powerful Lomellini family provided the basis for biographical operas such as Il cantore di Venezia by Virginio Marchi (1835), Stradella by Louis Niedermeyer (Paris, 1837), Stradella by César Franck (1841, unfinished), Alessandro Stradella by Friedrich von Flotow (Hamburg, 1844), Alessandro Stradella by Adolf Schimon (1846), Stradella il trovatore by Vincenzo Moscuzza (1850), Alessandro Stradella by Giuseppe Sinico (1864) and Ti vedo, ti sento, mi perdo by Salvatore Sciarrino (Teatro alla Scala, 2017).

American novelist F. Marion Crawford also produced a highly romanticized novel of Stradella's affair and flight from Venice, titled Stradella (Macmillan 1909).

== Recordings ==
- Stradella: Il barcheggio – Valentina Valente; Marco Lazzara; Giovanni Dagnino; Alessandro Stradella Consort; Estevan Velardi (conductor) Label: Bongiovanni GB 2102
- Stradella: Moro per amore – Marco Beasley; Marco Lazzara; Roberta Invernizzi; Riccardo Ristori; Silvia Piccollo; Alessandro Stradella Consort; Estevan Velardi (conductor). Label: Bongiovanni GB 2153
- Stradella: Esule dalle sfere – Roberta Invernizzi; Marco Lazzara; Riccardo Ristori; Mario Nuvoli; Alessandro Stradella Consort; Estevan Velardi (conductor). Label: Bongiovanni GB 2165
- Cantatas Amanti, olà, olà!; Chi resiste al Dio bendato Estevan Velardi, Alessandro Stradella Consort
- Stradella: Motets Sandrine Piau, Gérard Lesne, Il Seminario musicale
- Cantatas: Brandes, Paul O'Dette, Springfels, Weiss. Harmonia Mundi
- Cantata per il Santissimo Natale (Christmas Eve Cantata): Si apra al riso La Magnifica Comunità. Enrico Casazza. Brilliant
- San Giovanni Battista (1) Erato, (2) Academia Montis Regalis, Alessandro de Marchi. Hyperion 2008
- Stradella: La Susanna (oratorio) - Martin Oro, Gemma Bertagnolli, Sergio Foresti, Mirko Guadagnini & Isabel Alvarez. Harmonices Mundi, Claudio Astronio. Brilliant 2011
- Stradella: Duets - Susanne Rydén, Emma Kirkby, Sergio Foresti, Christine Marsoner & Alessio Tosi. Harmonices Mundi, Claudio Astronio. Brilliant 2013
- Stradella: La forza delle stelle (serenata) - Nora Tabbush, Claudia Di Carlo, Raffele Pé, Maurizio Dalena & Mauro Borgioni, Ensemble Mare Nostrum, Andrea De Carlo. Arcana 2013
- Stradella: San Giovanni Crisostomo (oratorio) - Arianna Vendittelli, Matteo Bellotto, Filippo Mineccia, Luca Cervoni & Nora Tabbush Ensemble Mare Nostrum, Andrea De Carlo. Arcana 2014
- Stradella: Santa Editta (oratorio) - Veronica Cangemi, Francesca Aspromonte, Claudia Di Carlo, Gabriella Martellacci, Fernando Guimarães & Sergio Foresti. Ensemble Mare Nostrum, Andrea De Carlo. Arcana 2015
- Stradella: Santa Pelagia (oratorio) - Roberta Mameli, Raffaele Pe, Luca Cervoni & Sergio Foresti. Ensemble Mare Nostrum, Andrea De Carlo. Arcana 2016
- Stradella: La Doriclea (opera) - Emőke Baráth, Giuseppina Bridelli, Xavier Sabata, Luca Cervoni, Gabriella Martellacci & Riccardo Novaro. Il Pomo d'Oro, Andrea De Carlo. Arcana 2017
- Stradella: Il Trespolo Tutore (opera) - Roberta Mameli, Riccardo Novaro, Silvia Frigato, Rafał Tomkiewicz, Luca Cervoni & Paola Valentina Molinari. Ensemble Mare Nostrum, Andrea De Carlo. Arcana 2019

== See also ==
- List of unsolved murders
