= Ercole amante (Bembo) =

1707 Italian-language opera about Hercules by Antonia Bembo

- by Antonia Bembo
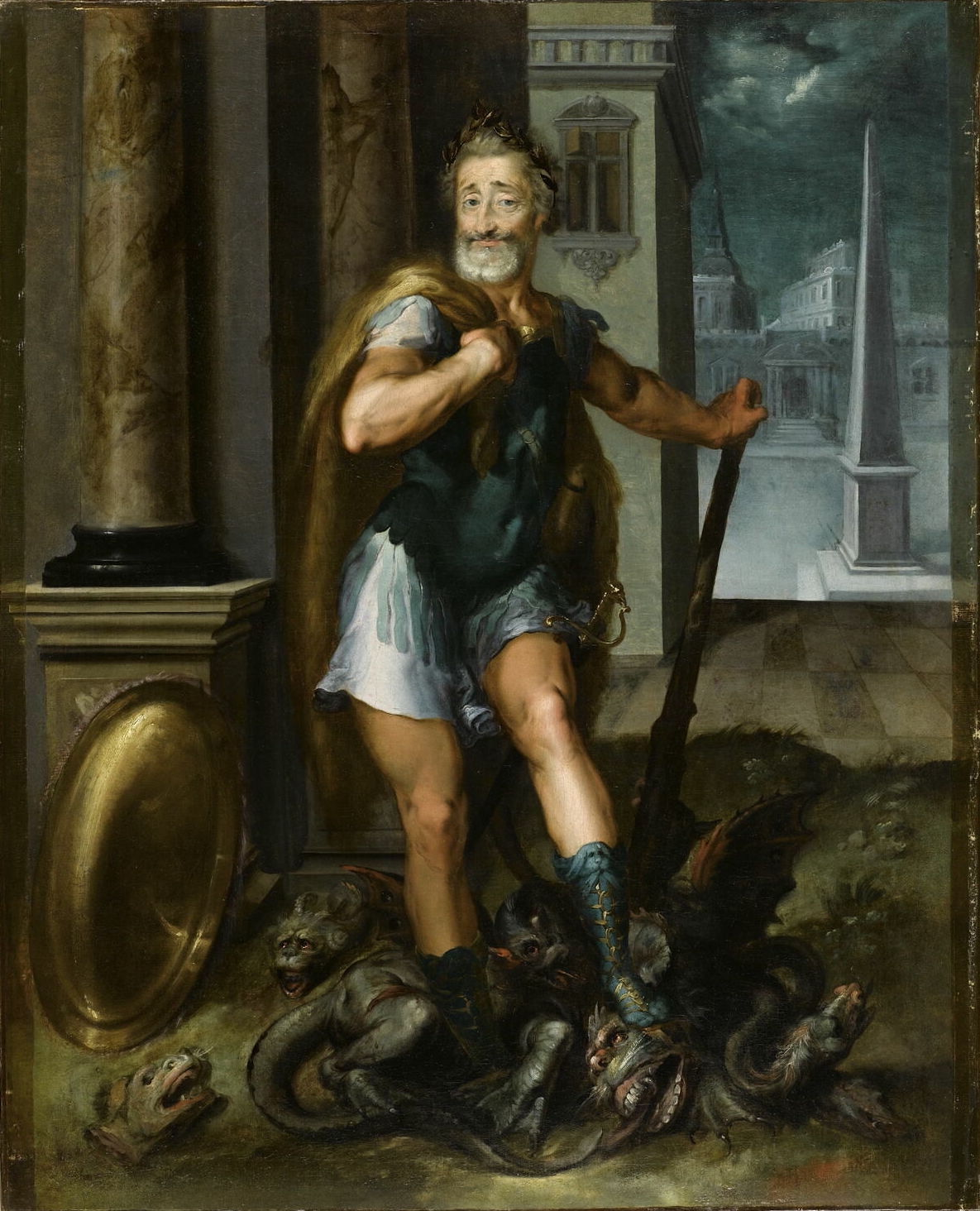
- Portrait of Henry IV of France as Hercules
- Translation: Hercules in Love
- Librettist: Francesco Buti
- Language: Italian
- Based on: Sophocles, The Trachiniae; Ovid, Metamorphoses; Pseudo-Apollodorus, Bibliotheca; Seneca, Hercules Oetaeus
- Premiere: 26 May 2023; Liederhalle, Stuttgart

Ercole amante (Hercules in Love) is an 18th-century Italian-language opera in five acts. It was composed in France in 1707 by Antonia Bembo with a libretto by Francesco Buti. Bembo reused Buti's libretto from Francesco Cavalli's 1662 opera of the same name. The libretto is based on stories of Hercules from Sophocles's Women of Trachis, Ovid's Metamorphoses, Pseudo-Apollodorus's Bibliotheca, and Seneca's Hercules Oetaeus.

The opera was first performed in Stuttgart in 2023 in a concert version. Ars Minerva plans to give the first staged performance in San Francisco in November 2025. The Paris Opera is scheduled to perform Ercole in May 2026.

== Synopsis ==
Setting: Mythological ancient Greece

Ercole loves Iole, who is in love with his son Hyllo. Venere tries to help Ercole by casting a spell on Iole, but Giunone opposes them. Iole, seeking revenge for her father’s death, tries to kill Ercole, but he mistakes Hyllo as the attacker. Dejanira pleads for Hyllo, and Iole agrees to accept Ercole if he spares her beloved. Hyllo, despairing, attempts suicide but is saved by Nettuno. Iole and Dejanira believe Hyllo dead. Iole's father’s ghost appears, warning Iole she should not marry Ercole.Venere, however, uses an enchanted chair to make Iole feel affection for Ercole. Meanwhile, Licco has Iole give Ercole a poisoned shirt, which kills him. Giunone triumphs, reuniting Hyllo and Iole.

=== Act I ===
Ercole (Hercules) has defeated the Kingdom of Oechalia and killed its ruler, Eutyro. Ercole loves Eutyro's daughter Iole, but she is betrothed to Ercole's son Hyllo. Venere (Venus), goddess of love, arrives with the Graces and decides to help Ercole win Iole by casting a spell on her. Hearing of Venere's work, the goddess Giunone (Juno) decides to thwart Venere and Ercole.

=== Act II ===
The lovers Hyllo and Iole learn of Ercole's interest in her. Giunone sings that she will stop Venere. Pasithea, one of the Graces, goes to the cave of Sleep to seek his help in Venere's plans.

=== Act III ===
Ercole is in a deep slumber. Iole moves to kill Ercole, seeking to avenge her father. Ercole is awakened by the god Mercurio (Mercury). Ercole believes Hyllo was trying to kill him and wants his son dead. Dejanira, Ercole's wife, pleads for their son. Iole promises she will accept Ercole if he will spare Hyllo. Ercole exiles his wife and orders Hyllo confined to a tower overlooking the ocean.

=== Act IV ===
Hyllo jumps from his tower into the sea intending suicide. But Giunone calls upon Nettuno (Neptune), god of the sea, to save Hyllo. Iole and Dejanira do not know of the gods' intervention and believe Hyllo dead. They go to the grave of Iole's father. Eutyro's ghost appears, warning Iole she should not marry Ercole. Venere continues her schemes by creating an enchanted chair. When Iole sits in it, she feels affection for Ercole.

=== Act V ===
In Hades, Eutyro and the other victims of Ercole sing. Licco, a servant of Dejanira, plots to disrupt the wedding. At Licco's behest, Iole offers Ercole a shirt soaked in the blood of the centaur Nessus, who Ercole had killed. Ercole is poisoned by the shirt and dies. Giunone appears, triumphant, with Hyllo. He reunites with Iole. Ercole ascends to Heaven and marries Beauty.

== Composition ==
Venice in 1636

Antonia Bembo was born in the Republic of Venice circa 1640. She had voice lessons from Francesco Cavalli in Venice in the 1650s and may also have studied composition under him. Around 1676, she fled Venice to escape an abusive marriage and settled in Paris. King Louis XIV heard her sing and awarded a pension. She lived at the convent at the Church of Notre-Dame-de-Bonne-Nouvelle.

Bembo's surviving works date from the 1690s and 1700s. "Bembo's compositions sometimes sound thoroughly French, at other times purely Italian. Not infrequently, she deploys both styles in one work and even tries to merge them." In this Bembo was like her contemporaries Paolo Lorenzani and Theobaldo di Gatti–two other Italian musicians working in Paris under the patronage of Louis XIV.

In 1707, she completed her new version of Ercole amante, using Francesco Buti's libretto from Cavalli's 1662 opera of the same name. It had been commissioned by Cardinal Mazarin to celebrate Louis XIV's marriage (June 9, 1660) to Maria Theresa of Spain, but the death of Mazarin (March 9, 1661) and delays in constructing a new theater (Théâtre des Tuileries) meant Cavalli's opera was not performed until February 1662. Buti's libretto was available to Bembo as it had been published the year of its premiere by the king's music publishers, the Ballard firm, with the Italian lyrics and a French translation on facing pages. Forty-five years later, Bembo dedicated her version to Louis XIV–Marie Theresa had died in 1683–who had been referred to as the "Hercule Gaulois" ("the French Hercules").

It was not common to recycle a libretto that old for a work written in a new style and unknown why it was written, since operas at the time were usually commissioned. Bembo's style in Ercole is French in form with its dances and chorus but is set in an Italian style akin to Jean-Baptiste Lully, the leading Italian composer in France in the late Seventeenth Century, and André Campra, Lully's successor in that role. There is no evidence that the opera was performed at the time, although one scholar has stated the work was performed before Louis XIV in 1707. Yvonne Rokseth attributed the lack of a staging to a change in musical tastes in France, Italian-style works like Bembo's having fallen out of favor.

The holographic score is held by the Bibliothèque nationale de France, having been acquired by the library in the 1930s. That score was brought to public attention in 1937 with Rokseth's article on Bembo in The Musical Quarterly.

== Performances ==
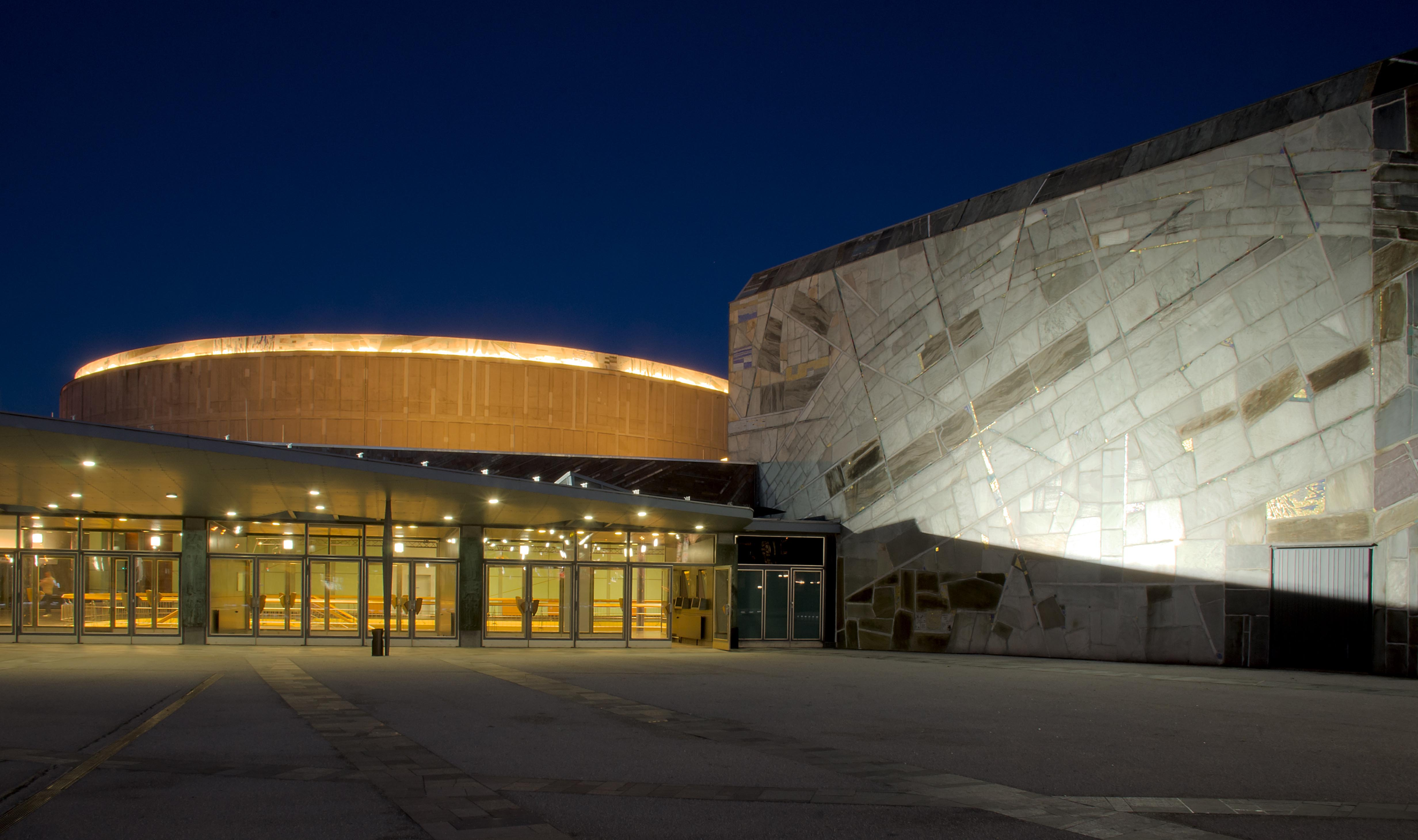
Stuttgart's Liederhalle, site of the 2023 premiere

Il Gusto Barocco premiered Ercole in a concert version on May 23, 2023, at the Liederhalle in Stuttgart. Jörg Halubek conducted the performance from the harpsichord and Yannick Debus sang the title role. A critic wrote of the premiere: "This is a mature work–the artist was born in the 1640s–whose style combines Italian and French influences around a Mannerist poetry with a somewhat tangled plot, including a magic seat and a poisoned tunic. The musical line is quite flattering, sometimes as disconcerting as it is daring. It is necessarily moving to hear a work resonate for the very first time more than three hundred years after its composition." Another review was critical of the "copious and detrimental cuts" made by Halubek:

Recitatives are shortened ruthlessly to less than their bare bones. The entire excision of Juno asking Pasithea and her husband Somnus if she may borrow his rod (so that the dangerously randy Hercules can be lulled asleep) means that the alluring preceding music for Pasithea and her retinue . . . becomes isolated from its purpose. Act 5 scene 1 is an ombra tour de force that should have four of Hercules’ victims in hell taking turns to exult at impending vengeance, but it is shredded down to merely a sliver for one spectral gloater.

Classic Produktion Osnabrück released the Stuttgart performance on compact disc on May 22, 2025.

Il Gusto Barocco again performed the opera in a concert version during the Early Music Days festival in Herne on November 11, 2023. Westdeutscher Rundfunk Köln broadcast the concert live.

Ars Minerva, an opera company that specializes in rarely performed works, will perform Ercole in San Francisco in November 2025. It will star Zachary Gordin, Aura Veruni, Kindra Scharich, Maxwell Ary, and Sara Coudin; Céline Ricci is to direct the production and Matthew Dirst will conduct the music. The Paris Opera with Capella Mediterranea is scheduled to perform the opera in May 2026 at the Opéra Bastille. Leonardo García-Alarcón is to conduct and Andreas Wolf is to sing the title role.

Two arias from Ercole–"Mingannasti in verità" and "Volgete altrove il guardo"–were sung by Mariana Flores at a BBC Proms concert at Cadogan Hall on July 29, 2019.

== Roles ==
Roles, voice types, 2023 Stuttgart, 2025 San Francisco, 2026 Paris
Role	Voice type	2023 concert premiere, Stuttgart Conductor: Jörg Halubek	2025, Ars Minerva, San Francisco Conductor: Matthew Dirst	2026, Paris Opera Conductor:Leonardo García-Alarcón
Ercole (Hercules)	bass	Yannick Debus	Zachary Gordin	Andreas Wolf
Dejanira, wife of Ercole	alto	Alena Dantcheva	Kindra Scharich	Deepa Johnny
Iole, daughter of King Eutyro	soprano	Anita Rosati	Lila Khazoum	Ana Vieira Leite
Hillo, son of Ercole & Dejanira	tenor	David Tricou	Max Ary	Alasdair Kent
Pasithea, one of the Graces	soprano	Chelsea Zurflüh		Teona Todua
Giunone (Juno), goddess	soprano	Flore Van Meersche	Aura Veruni	Julie Fuchs
Venere (Venus), goddess of love	soprano	Chelsea Zurflüh	Melissa Sondhi	Sandrine Piau
Licco, servant of Dejanira	tenor	Andrès Montilla-Acurero		Marcel Beekman
Nettuno (Neptune), god of the sea	baritone	Hans Porten		Alex Rosen
Ghost of King Eutyro	baritone	Hans Porten		Alex Rosen

== See also ==
- Ercole amante, Cavalli opera with the same libretto (1662).
- Hercules, Handel opera also based on Sophocles's Women of Trachis and Ovid's Metamorphoses (1745).
- Hercule mourant, Dauvergne opera also based on Sophocles's Women of Trachis (1751).
