= Flavio Crispo =

Opera

Flavio Crispo is a 1720 opera by Dresden kapellmeister Johann David Heinichen concerning Flavius Crispus, son of the Emperor Constantine I.

The opera was never performed due to an incident that occurred during a rehearsal, when the two star castratos, Matteo Berselli and Senesino, accused Heinichen of a mistake in the score during a rehearsal and deemed the work "unsingable". Senesino then tore up Berselli's part for one of his arias and cast it at the composer's feet. The incident was witnessed by Baron von Mordaxt, Protector of the King's Music who reported it to Friedrich August I, leading to the opera’s cancellation and the dismissal not only of the three Italian singers, but of the Italian architects, painters, and carpenters employed at the Dresden court. Senesino may have wanted to escape from the contract due to a more attractive offer from Handel, who the previous year had attempted to recruit the castrato to his company in London. Senesino was quickly hired by the Royal Academy of Music and spent the next 16 years in London. Heinichen never composed another opera for Dresden.

== Recording ==
- Flavio Crispo Leandro Marziotte - as Flavio, Dana Marbach - as Elena, English princess at the court, Alessandra Visentin - Fausta, Silke Gäng - as Imilee, Nina Bernsteiner - Gilimero, Tobias Hunger - Massenzio, Ismael Arronitz - Constantino, Il Gusto Barocco, Jörg Halubek CPO 2018
