= Ercole amante =

1662 Italian-language opera about Hercules by Francesco Cavalli

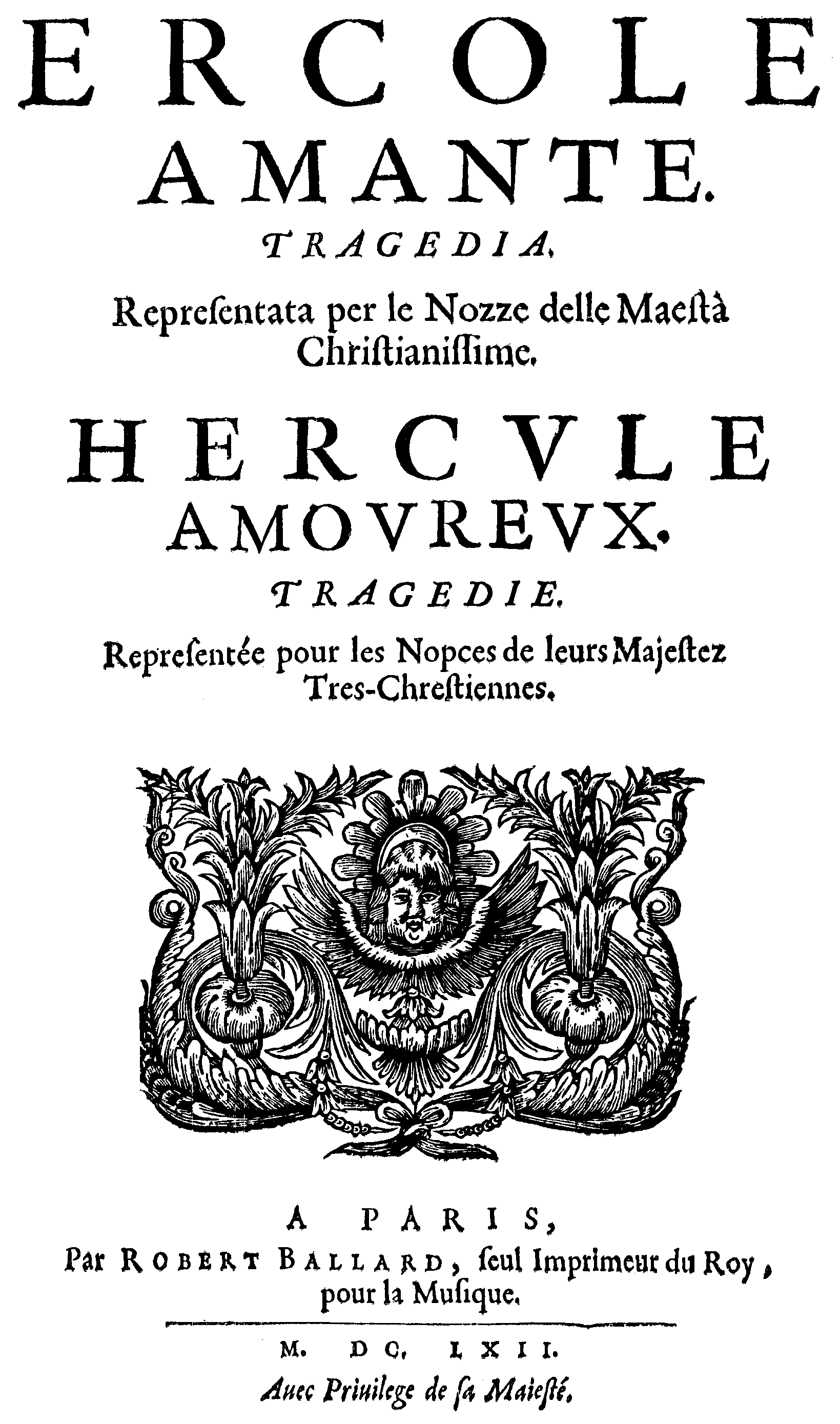
Title page of the 1662 libretto

Ercole amante (Hercules in Love, French: Hercule amoureux) is an opera in a prologue and five acts by Francesco Cavalli. Its Italian libretto is by Francesco Buti, based on Sophocles' The Trachiniae and on the ninth book of Ovid's Metamorphoses. The first performance took place on 7 February 1662 in the Salle des Machines of the Tuileries in Paris.

== Background ==
Cardinal Mazarin commissioned the opera to celebrate the June 1660 wedding of Louis XIV and Maria Theresa of Spain, but preparations for the staging were on a grand scale and caused a twenty-month delay, irritating the composer. Worse for him, eighteen ballet entrées and intermèdes by Isaac de Benserade with music Jean-Baptiste Lully were inserted, mostly at the ends of Cavalli's acts, to cater to French taste. These were not merely diversions but also served to further the plot, and in the event they met with greater approval from the audience than Ercole amante itself, helping boost Lully's position at the French court.

== Performance history ==
After its premiere the opera was given another seven times: 14 and 18 February; 18, 22, 25, and 29 April; and 6 May. The theatre was built specifically to present the opera, and if the construction costs of the theatre are included, it was the most expensive of the French court's theatrical productions mounted up to that point.

== Roles ==
Roles, voice type, premiere cast
Role	Voice type	Premiere cast, 7 February 1662
Cinzia, prologue	soprano castrato	Giuseppe Meloni
Ercole	bass	Vincenzo Piccini
Deianira, Ercole's wife	soprano	Leonora Ballarini
Hyllo, son of Ercole	tenor	Giuseppe Agostino Poncelli
Iole	soprano	Anna Bergerotti
La bellezza	soprano	Anne de La Barre
Giunone	soprano castrato (en travesti)	Antonio Rivani
Mercurio	tenor	Signor Tagliavacca
Nettuno	bass	Paolo Bordigone
Venere	soprano	Hylaire Dupuis
Tevere	bass	Signor Beauchamps
Shade of Eutyro	bass	Paolo Bordigone
Licco	contralto castrato	Giuseppe Chiarini
Shade of King Laomedonte	tenor	Signor Vulpio
Shade of Bussiride	contralto castrato	Signor Zanetto
Shade of Queen Clerica	soprano	Anne de La Barre
Pasithea	soprano	Signora Bordoni
Sonno	silent actor	
Paggio	soprano	

== Recordings ==
=== Audio ===
- 1980: Yvonne Minton (Giunone), Felicity Palmer (Jole), Patricia Miller (Dejanira), Colette Alliot-Lugaz (Venere, Bellezza), Ulrik Cold (Ercole), Keith Lewis (Hyllo), Richard Cassinelli (Licco), John Tomlinson (Tevere, Nettuno) with the English Bach Festival Chorus & Baroque Orchestra, conducted by Michel Corboz. Audio CD: Erato

=== Video ===
- 2009: Luca Pisaroni (Ercole), Veronica Cangemi (Iole), Anna Bonitatibus (Giunone), Jeremy Ovenden (Hyllo), Anna Maria Panzarella (Deianira), Marlin Miller (Licco), Umberto Chiummo (Nettuno, Tevere, Spirit of Eutyro) with the Concerto Köln and the Chorus of De Nederlandse Opera, conducted by Ivor Bolton. Recorded live, Het Musiektheater, Amsterdam, 15 & 20 January 2009; stage director: David Alden. The performance includes several of the ballet entrées composed by Lully; choreographer: Jonathan Lunn. Blu-ray: Opus Arte.
- 2019: Nahuel di Pierro (Ercole), Francesca Aspromonte (Iole), Anna Bonitatibus (Giunone), Krystian Adam (Hyllo), Giuseppina Bridelli (Deianira), Dominique Visse (Licco), Eugène Lefebvre (Pasitea, Clerica), Giulia Semenzato (Venere, Bellezza, Cinzia), Luca Tittoto (Nettuno, Eutyro) with the ensemble Pygmalion, conducted by Raphaël Pichon. Recorded live, Opéra-Comique, Paris, 6 and 8 November 2019; stage directors: Valérie Lesort, Christian Hecq. Blu-ray: Naxos.

== See also ==
- Ercole amante, 1707 opera by Antonia Bembo using the same libretto.
