= Le nozze di Teti e di Peleo (disambiguation) =

Le nozze di Teti e di Peleo may refer to:

- Le nozze di Teti e di Peleo (1639), an opera by the baroque composer Francesco Cavalli
- Le nozze di Peleo e di Theti (1654), an opera by Carlo Caproli
- Le nozze di Teti e di Peleo, a cantata by the belcanto composer Gioachino Rossini
