= Hercule mourant =

Opera by Antoine Dauvergne

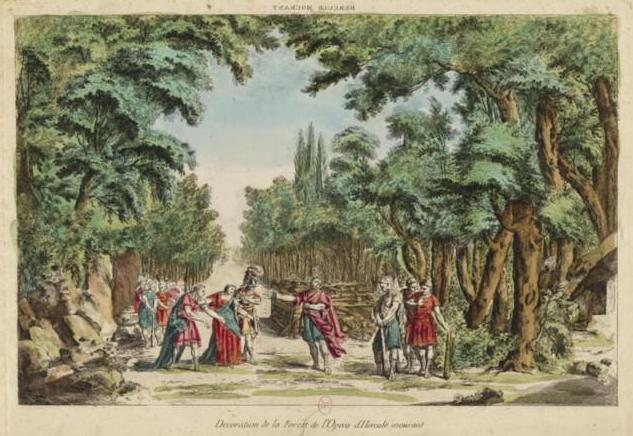
The forest of Mount Oeta, scene from Act 5 in the original production

Hercule mourant (Hercules Dying) is an opera by the French composer Antoine Dauvergne, first performed at the Académie Royale de Musique (Paris Opéra) on 3 April 1761. It takes the form of a tragédie lyrique in five acts. The libretto, by Jean-François Marmontel, is based on the tragedies The Women of Trachis by Sophocles and Hercule mourant, ou La Déjanire (1634) by Jean Rotrou.

== Performance history ==
The premiere was delayed by the death of the Duke of Burgundy. The opera ran for 18 performances.

Hercule mourant was given its first performance in modern times on 11 November 2011 at the Opéra Royal de Versailles in a concert version with Christophe Rousset conducting Les Talens Lyriques. The title role was sung by Andrew Foster-Williams with Veronique Gens as Déjanire. A recording of the performance was released the following year on the Aparté label.

== Roles ==
Cast	Voice type	Premiere
Hercule (Hercules)	basse-taille (bass-baritone)	Nicolas Gélin
Déjanire (Deianira), his wife	soprano	Marie-Jeanne Fesch, known as "Chevalier"
Hilus (Hyllus), their son	haute-contre	Jean-Pierre Pillot
Philoctète (Philoctetes)	basse-taille	Henri Larrivée
Ïole (Iole)	soprano	Sophie Arnould
Dircé	soprano	Davaux
Junon (the goddess Juno)	soprano	Rozet
La Jalousie (Jealousy)	basse-taille	Henri Larrivée
Jupiter		Jaubert
Le grand prêtre de Jupiter (the high priest of Jupiter)		
Un thessalien (a Thessalian man)		
Une thesalienne (a Thessalian woman)		
Une captive (a captive woman)		

== Synopsis ==
=== Act 1 ===
Scene: the palace of Hercules
Deianara awaits the return of her husband Hercules from completing his Twelve Labours. Hercules sends captives from his expedition in advance. His son Hyllus immediately falls in love with one of them, Iole. Meanwhile, Hercules' arch-enemy the goddess Juno sends Jealousy to make trouble for him with the help of Deianara's maid Dirce.

=== Act 2 ===
Scene: the palace gardens, by the sea
Hyllus declares his love to Iole but Iole asks whether she could love the son of Hercules, her father's killer. More distressingly, she tells him Hercules himself has fallen in love with her and plans to repudiate Deianara in her favour. Hercules arrives to celebrate the homecoming feast. Dirce reveals Hercules' love for Iole to Deianara. In a jealous rage, Deianara plans to use the love potion made from the blood of the dying centaur Nessus.

=== Act 3 ===
Scene: An amphitheatre near Mount Olympus and the Temple of Jupiter
Hercules proclaims the Olympic Games in honour of his father Jupiter. Hyllus arrives and gives him the robe Deianara has sent, dipped in the blood of Nessus. He describes how impatient his mother is to see her husband again. Moved by her concern and persuaded by his friend Philoctetes, Hercules decides to renounce Iole. As he prepares to sacrifice to Jupiter he puts on the robe.

=== Act 4 ===
Scene: The vestibule of the temple of Jupiter at Trachis
Deianara has had an ominous dream of the blood-covered robe bursting into flames and begs Jupiter to save Hercules. As the sacrifice takes place the temple is shaken and the priests shut the doors to Deianara; the god has rejected her prayer. Hyllus brings the news that the poisoned robe has burned Hercules and he is now dying. Hercules has sent Hyllus to kill Deianara but he relents when she begs him to tell Hercules on his deathbed that she has always loved him.

=== Act 5 ===
Scene: The summit of Mount Oeta.
Hercules' companions raise a funeral pyre for the dying hero. Hercules asks his friend Philoctetes to kill him with an arrow but Philoctetes refuses. Hyllus tells Hercules that Deianara did not mean to kill him, just before news comes that Deianara has committed suicide out of grief. Hercules now joins Hyllus and Iole in marriage and asks his son to do him one last favour: to light the funeral pyre and burn him to death. Hyllus is horrified but at that moment a lightning bolt from heaven strikes the pyre and it bursts into flames. Hercules emerges from the fire on a flying chariot sent by Jupiter, who welcomes his son into heaven.

== Recording ==
- Hercule mourant, Andrew Foster-Williams (Hercule), Véronique Gens (Déjanire), Emiliano Gonzalez Toro (Hilus), Les Chantres du Centre de musique baroque de Versailles, Les Talens Lyriques, conducted by Christophe Rousset (2 CDs, Aparté, 2012)

== See also ==
- Ercole amante, Antonia Bembo opera also based on Sophocles's Women of Trachis

== Sources ==
- David Charlton Opera in the Age of Rousseau: Music, Confrontation, Realism, Cambridge University Press, 2012.
- Félix Clément and Pierre Larousse Dictionnaire des Opéras, Paris, 1881.
- (in French) Benoït Dratwicki, Antoine Dauvergne (1713—1797): une carrière tourmentée dans la France musicale des Lumières, Editions Mardaga, 2011.
- Benoït Dratwicki, booklet notes to the Rousset recording.
