= La Circe (Ziani) =

La Circe is a 1665 opera by Pietro Andrea Ziani to a libretto by Cristoforo Ivanovich (1620–1689) based on the Greek legends about the sorceress Circe. It was first performed on 9 June 1665 in the Neue Favorita open air theatre in the Laxenburg castles for the 25th birthday of the Holy Roman Emperor Leopold I. It was revived for the first time since 1665 by Ars Minerva in San Francisco in 2017.
