= Francesco Buti =

Francesco Buti (Narni, 1604 – Narni, 15 June 1682) was an Italian poet and librettist.

== Biography ==
Abbot and doctor of law, he was secretary in Rome of Cardinal Antonio Barberini, nephew of Pope Urban VIII. In 1645 he emigrated to France with the Barberini family, which fell from grace after the election to the papacy of Innocenzo X.

Settling in Paris, he became a trusted man of Cardinal Giulio Mazzarino who made him responsible for organizing parties and supervising court performances.

He brought to the French capital the musicians Luigi Rossi, Carlo Caproli and Francesco Cavalli, for whom he wrote the librettos for three of the operas given in those years in Paris: Orfeo (1647), Le nozze di Peleo e di Theti (1654; music now lost), and Ercole amante (1662). Antonia Bembo used the libretto of the last for her setting of Ercole amante (1707).

He also wrote the lyrics for some ballets by Jean-Baptiste Lully (L'amour malade, Ballet de l'impatience).
