= Orfeo (Rossi) =

1647 Italian opera by Luigi Rossi, premiered in France

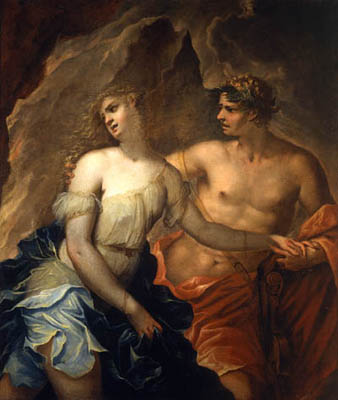

Orfeo (Orpheus) is an Italian opera in three acts, a prologue and an epilogue by the composer Luigi Rossi. The libretto, by Francesco Buti, is based on the myth of Orpheus and Eurydice. Orfeo premiered at the Théâtre du Palais-Royal in Paris on 2 March 1647. It was one of the earliest operas to be staged in France.

== Background and performance history ==
Rossi had already written one opera, Il palazzo incantato, for Rome. This aroused the interest of the French first minister, the Italian-born Cardinal Mazarin, who was eager to bring Italian culture to Paris and hired Rossi in 1646 to write an opera for the Paris carnival the following year. During his stay in France, Rossi learnt that his wife, Costanza, had died and the grief he felt influenced the music he was writing. The premiere was given a magnificent staging with the sets and stage machinery designed by Giacomo Torelli. Over 200 men were employed to work on the scenery. The choreography was by Giovan Battista Balbi. The performance, which lasted six hours, was a triumph. However, Rossi proved to be a victim of his own success. The expense of the performance was just one of many reasons stoking popular discontent against Cardinal Mazarin which soon broke out into full-scale rebellion (the Fronde). When Rossi returned to Paris in December 1647, he found the court had fled Paris and his services were no longer required.

The first modern revival was in 1976, by the Queens University Operatic Society, Belfast, Ireland, directed by Siubhan Farrell. The title role was played by Gillian Lightbody. On the first night the Irish republican hunger-striker Frank Stagg died, and rioting was widespread. Despite this, the performance went ahead. The next production was in La Scala in June 1982 with Jadranka Jovanović in the leading role. It was also performed on 2 April 1988 at the Indiana University Opera Theater, Bloomington and on 27 November 1990 at Queen Elizabeth Hall, London. It was given its New York staged premiere on 10 November 2021 at the Juilliard School.

== Roles ==
Role	Voice type	Premiere Cast
Orfeo/La Vittoria (Orpheus/Victory)	castrato (soprano)	Atto Melani
Euridice (Eurydice)	soprano	Anna Francesca Costa
Aristeo (Aristaeus)	castrato (soprano)	Marc'Antonio Pasqualini
Giove (Jupiter)	tenor	Jacopo Melani
Giunone (Juno)	soprano	Margherita Costa
Pluto	bass	Alessandro Cecconi
Proserpina (Proserpine)	castrato (soprano, travesti)	Domenico Dal Pane
Himeneo/Sospetto (Hymenaeus/Suspicion)	castrato (soprano)	Marc'Antonio Sportonio
Caronte (Charon)	tenor	Venanzio Leopardi
Amore (Cupid)	soprano	
Venere (Venus)	soprano	Rosina Martini
Endimione (Endymion)	tenor	
Momo (Momus)	tenor	
Bacco (Bacchus)	soprano (travesti)	
Satiro (satyr)	baritone	
Nutrice (nurse)	castrato (soprano, travesti)	
La Gelosia (Jealousy)	castrato (alto)	Micinello Panfili
Mercurio (Mercury)	castrato (alto)	
Apollo	castrato (alto)	
Una vecchia (an old woman)	tenor (travesti)	
Augure (an augur)	bass	
Le grazie (the three Graces)	sopranos (castrati, travesti)	Marc'Antonio Sportonio, Domenico Dal Pane, (not reported)
Le parche (the three Parcae)	two sopranos and one alto (castrati, travesti)	Marc'Antonio Sportonio, Domenico Dal Pane, (not reported)

== Synopsis ==
=== Prologue ===
The French armies win a glorious battle. Victory predicts France will triumph over evil just as Orpheus triumphed over the powers of the underworld.

=== Act One ===
Orpheus and Eurydice are due to be married. But when Eurydice's father, Endymion, takes auguries they forebode trouble. Aristaeus is unhappily in love with Eurydice and calls on the goddess Venus for aid. She tells him the marriage cannot be stopped but she will do her best to seduce Orpheus and Eurydice away from one another. As the wedding takes place, the torches suddenly go out, another evil omen.

=== Act Two ===
Venus, dressed as an old woman, tries to persuade Eurydice to love Aristaeus, but she is inflexible. Cupid betrays his mother, Venus's schemes to Orpheus and he rushes off to warn Eurydice. But Eurydice is bitten by a snake as she is dancing and dies.

=== Act Three ===
The grieving Orpheus sets off to rescue Eurydice from the underworld. Eurydice's ghost drives Aristaeus mad and he commits suicide. The goddess Juno persuades Proserpine, the wife of Pluto (the king of the underworld), that she should be jealous of Eurydice's beauty and allow her to return to the land of the living with Orpheus. Proserpine persuades Pluto to release Eurydice and he does so on condition that Orpheus does not turn round to look at her before they have reached the upper world. Orpheus fails in this task and loses Eurydice again. In his grief, he seeks only death but Jupiter appears to tell him he, Eurydice and his lyre will be turned into constellations.

=== Epilogue ===
Mercury explains that Orpheus's lyre represents the fleur-de-lys of France. The transformation of Orpheus and Eurydice into constellations is a symbol of the Resurrection. He ends by wishing the young King Louis a long life.

== Publication history ==
According to Loewenberg, the livret (libretto) was not printed, but an abrégé (synopsis) in French was published in 1647. A manuscript of the music, discovered by Romain Rolland in 1888 at the Biblioteca Chigi in Rome, was later moved to the Biblioteca Barberini in Rome. Goldschmidt published excerpts in 1901. Modern editions include one from G. Ricordi in Munich and another edited by Clifford Bartlett.

== Recordings ==
- Orfeo Agnès Mellon, Monique Zanetti, Sandrine Piau, Les Arts Florissants, conducted by William Christie (Harmonia Mundi, 1991)
- Orfeo Edited by Raphaël Pichon and Miguel Henry; Ensemble Pygmalion, Raphaël Pichon (Conductor); Jetske Mijnssen (Stage Director); Ben Baur (Sets), Gideon Davey (Costumes), Bernd Purkrabek (Lighting); Judith van Wanroij (Orfeo); Francesca Aspromonte (Euridice); Giuseppina Bridelli (Aristeo); Giulia Semenzato (Venere, Proserpina); Luigi de Donato (Augure, Plutone); Ray Chenez (Nutrice, Amore); Renato Dolcini (Satiro); Dominique Visse (Vecchia); Victor Torres (Endimione, Caronte); Marc Mauillon (Momo); David Tricou (Apollo)
