= Il Gusto Barocco =

German music ensemble

il Gusto Barocco is an orchestra specialising in early music and historical performance practice with its headquarters in Stuttgart.

== History ==
The Baroque Orchestra was founded in 2008 by Jörg Halubek and is made up of young freelance musicians. The repertoire focuses on the music of the 17th and 18th centuries and includes all genres from concerto to opera and church music. Depending on the work and genre, the ensemble performs in chamber music instrumentation to large orchestration. The common background of studying at the Schola Cantorum Basiliensis shapes the ensemble's approach to early music. Some members are active in teaching and research.

The ensemble is supported by the non-profit association il Gusto Barocco e. V.. The board of trustees is chaired by Member of the German Bundestag Stefan Kaufmann.

Since 2020, il gusto Barocco has presented its own event format with the Stuttgart series, which presents baroque opera, chamber music and organ music with renowned guests such as Leyla Schaigeh, Suzanne Jerosme, Florian Götz, and Filippo Mineccia. In the second year, the series of events was condensed into the Baroque Festival Week. Each year the focus is on a new opera discovery: in 2020 G.F. Handel's opera "Poro" was performed in the version "Cleofida - Queen of India" adapted by Georg Philipp Telemann for the Hamburg "Gänsemarktoper". This was followed in 2021 by "Muzio Scevola", an opera commissioned by the Royal Academy of Music from the London-based composers Filippo Amadei, Giovanni Bononcini, and George Frideric Handel, with a newly composed prologue by Thomas Leininger.

In recent years, the ensemble has attracted attention with musical theatre productions in Stuttgart and at the Nationaltheater Mannheim, among others. Numerous radio recordings were made.

== Performances ==
- 2008: Musikfest Stuttgart; Johann Sebastian Bach: The Art of Fugue, in an own arrangement for singers, zingers, trombones, and strings.
- 2009/2010: Staatstheater Stuttgart; A. Vivaldi: Juditha triumphans, Guest orchestra for a co-production of the Salzburger Festspiele with the Staatstheater Stuttgart.
- 2010/2011: Stuttgart, Gaisburger Kirche; Konzertzyklus „Bachs Musikalische Bibliothek“, 8 Konzertprogramme
- 2012: Kultur- und Kongresszentrum Liederhalle Giuseppe Antonio Brescianello: Tisbe (premiere).
- 2013–2016: Stuttgart, Liederhalle etc., three annual concert cycles under the title "Baroque Triathlon".
- 2016: Musikhochschule Stuttgart; Johann David Heinichen: Flavio Crispo, premiere.
- 2017: Nationaltheater Mannheim; Claudio Monteverdi: Il ritorno d´ulisse in patria (director: Markus Bothe).
- 2018/2019: Nationaltheater Mannheim; L’incoronazione di Poppea (director: Lorenzo Fioroni), Marienvesper (director: Calixto Bieito) and the production of „Ombra e Luce“ with staged madrigals by Monteverdi (Regie: Markus Bothe).
- 2019: Bachwoche Ansbach; Orchestra in Residence, Bachs Brandenburgische Konzerte, Weltliche Kantaten und Instrumentalkonzerte.

== Recordings ==
- 2014: Giuseppe Antonio Brescianello: Tisbe (with Nina Bernsteiner, Flavio Ferri-Benedetti, Julius Pfeifer, Matteo Bellotto, Leitung Jörg Halubek), Classic Produktion Osnabrück.
- 2016: Johann David Heinichen: Flavio Crispo (with Leandro Marziotte, Dana Marbach, Alessandra Visentin, Silke Gäng, Nina Bernsteiner, Tobias Hunger, Ismael Arronitz, Leitung Jörg Halubek), cpo.
