= Élisabeth Sophie Chéron =

French painter

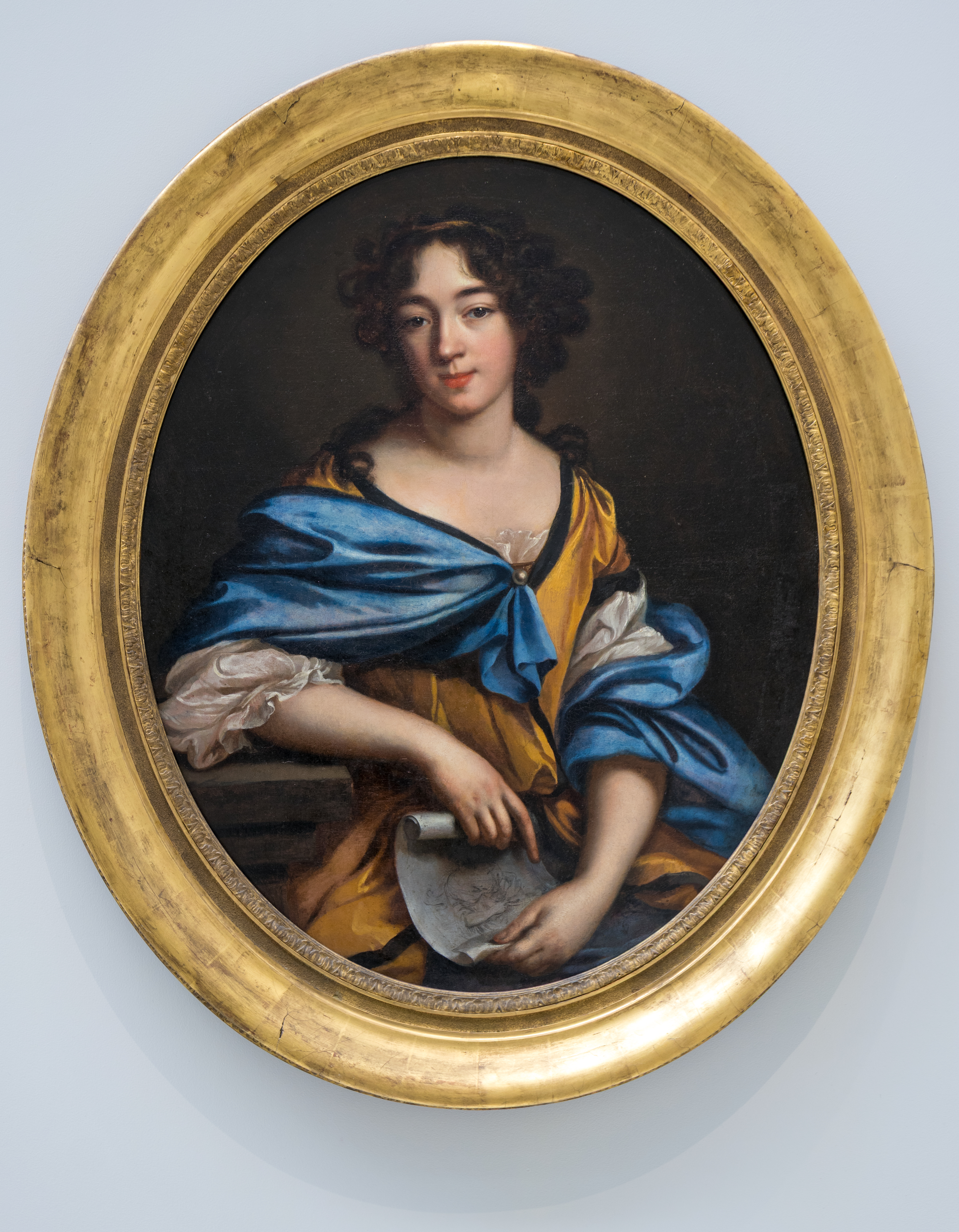
- self-portrait, 1672
- Born: 3 October 1648; Paris
- Died: 3 September 1711 (aged 62); Paris
- Occupation: Painter, printmaker, poet, writer, musician
- Spouse(s): Jacques Le Hay
- Parent(s): Henri Chéron

Élisabeth Sophie Chéron (French pronunciation: [elizabɛt sɔfi ʃeʁɔ̃]; 3 October 1648 – 3 September 1711) was a French painter and polymath. Known primarily today for her artworks, during her lifetime she was also acclaimed as a poet, musician, translator, and academician.

== Life ==
She was born in Paris. She was trained by her artist father, while still a child, in the arts of enamelling and miniature painting. Her father was a rigid Calvinist and endeavored to influence his daughter to adopt his religious belief, but her mother was a fervent Roman Catholic and persuaded Elizabeth to pass a year in a convent, during which time she ardently embraced the Catholic faith. At 22, in 1670, she was admitted to the Académie Royale de Peinture et de Sculpture as a portrait painter under the sponsorship of the influential artist Charles Le Brun. Her 1672 Self-portrait was accepted as her morceau de réception (reception piece). She was the fourth woman painter to enter the academy, nine years after Catherine Girardon and three years after Madeleine and Geneviève, the two sisters of Louis de Boullogne.

She exhibited regularly at the Salon while also writing poetry and producing translations. She was fluent in Hebrew, Greek, and Latin. She published her book of Psalm paraphrases in 1694 as the Essay de pseaumes et cantiques mis en vers, et enrichis de figures. Her literary talent was recognized in 1699 when she was named a member of the Accademia dei Ricovrati in Padua under the academician name of Erato. Her Psalms were later set to music by Jean-Baptiste Drouard de Bousset and Antonia Bembo, a Venetian noblewoman.

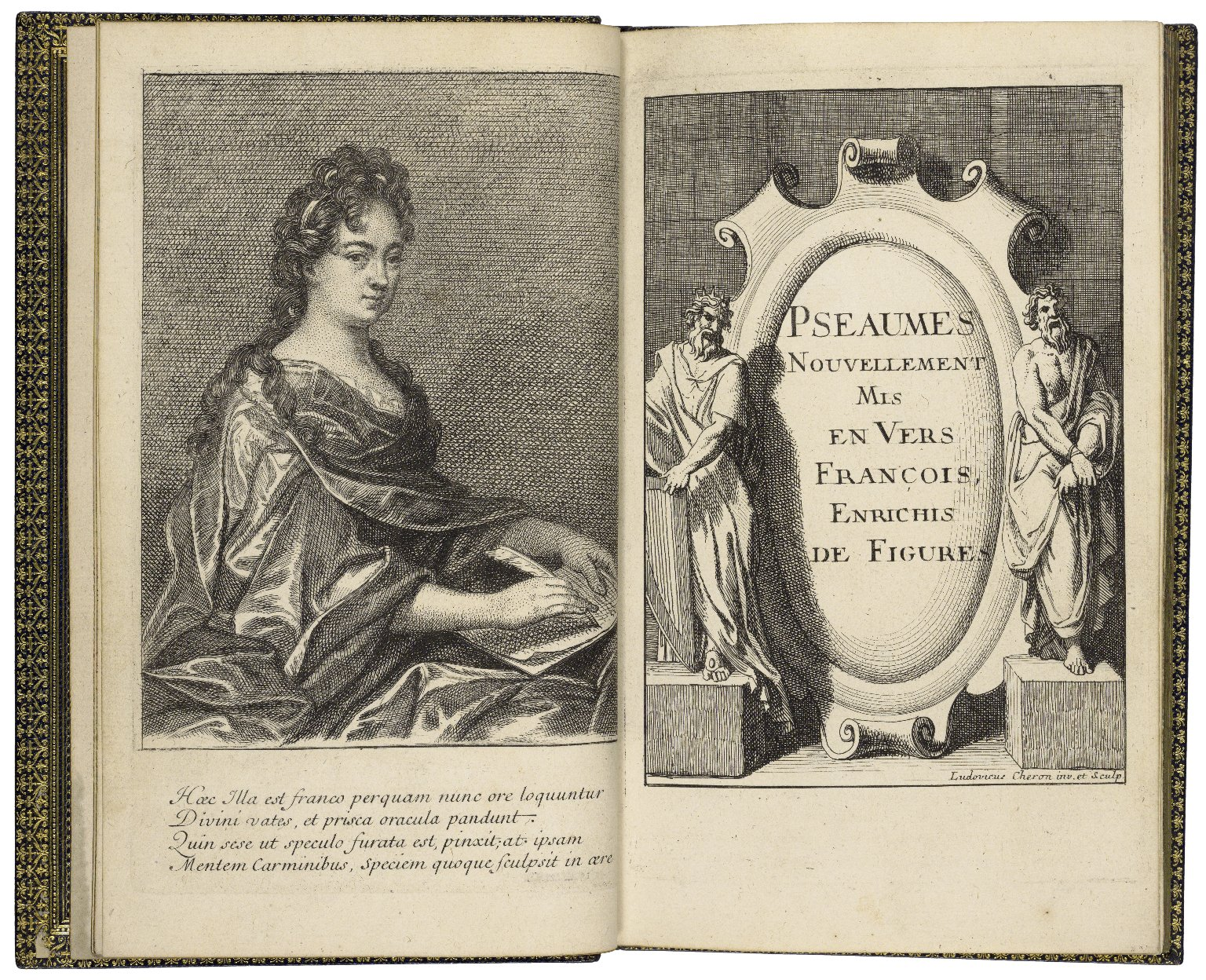
The title page of a 1694 edition of Cheron's translation of the Psalms into French

She was an affectionate daughter to both her parents and devoted her earnings to her brother Louis, who studied art in Italy. She was indifferent to proposals of marriage throughout her life, many from brilliant men in her intellectual circle. In 1708, at age 60, and to the surprise of her friends she married Jacques Le Hay, the King's engineer, after which she was known as Madame Le Hay.

She died aged 62 and is buried in the Church of Saint-Sulpice, Paris. The following lines are placed beneath her portrait in the church:

"The unusual possession of two exquisite talents will render Cheron an ornament to France for all time. Nothing save the grace of her brush could equal the excellencies of her pen."

== Works ==
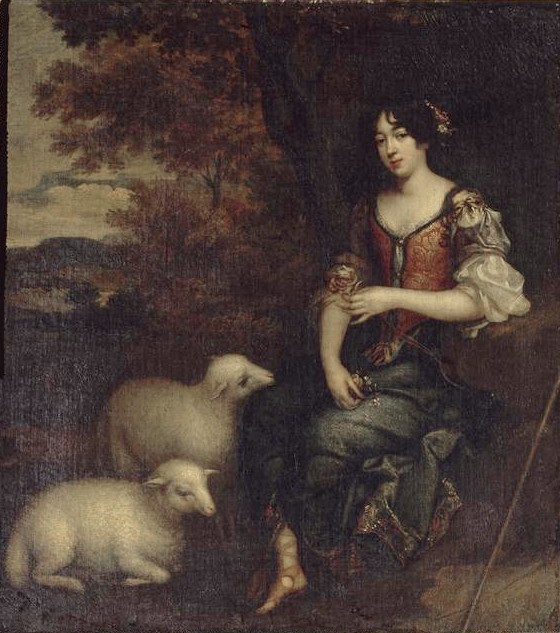
Self-portrait, 1670s

Especially well known are her portrait of Antoinette Deshoulières and her Descent from the Cross.Her notable writings are:

- Livre des Principes à Dessiner, 1706; A book of principles in drawing, Digitised by Österreichische Nationalbibliothek
- Psaumes et Cantiques mis en vers, 1694; Psalms and Canticles,
- Le Cantique d'Habacuc et le Psaume, traduit en vers; The Song of Habakkuk and the Psalm, verse translated;
- Les Cerises Renversées, a small poem published in 1717 after her death, and put into Latin verse by Raux, in 1797.
