= Zachary Gordin =

American baritone (born 1979)

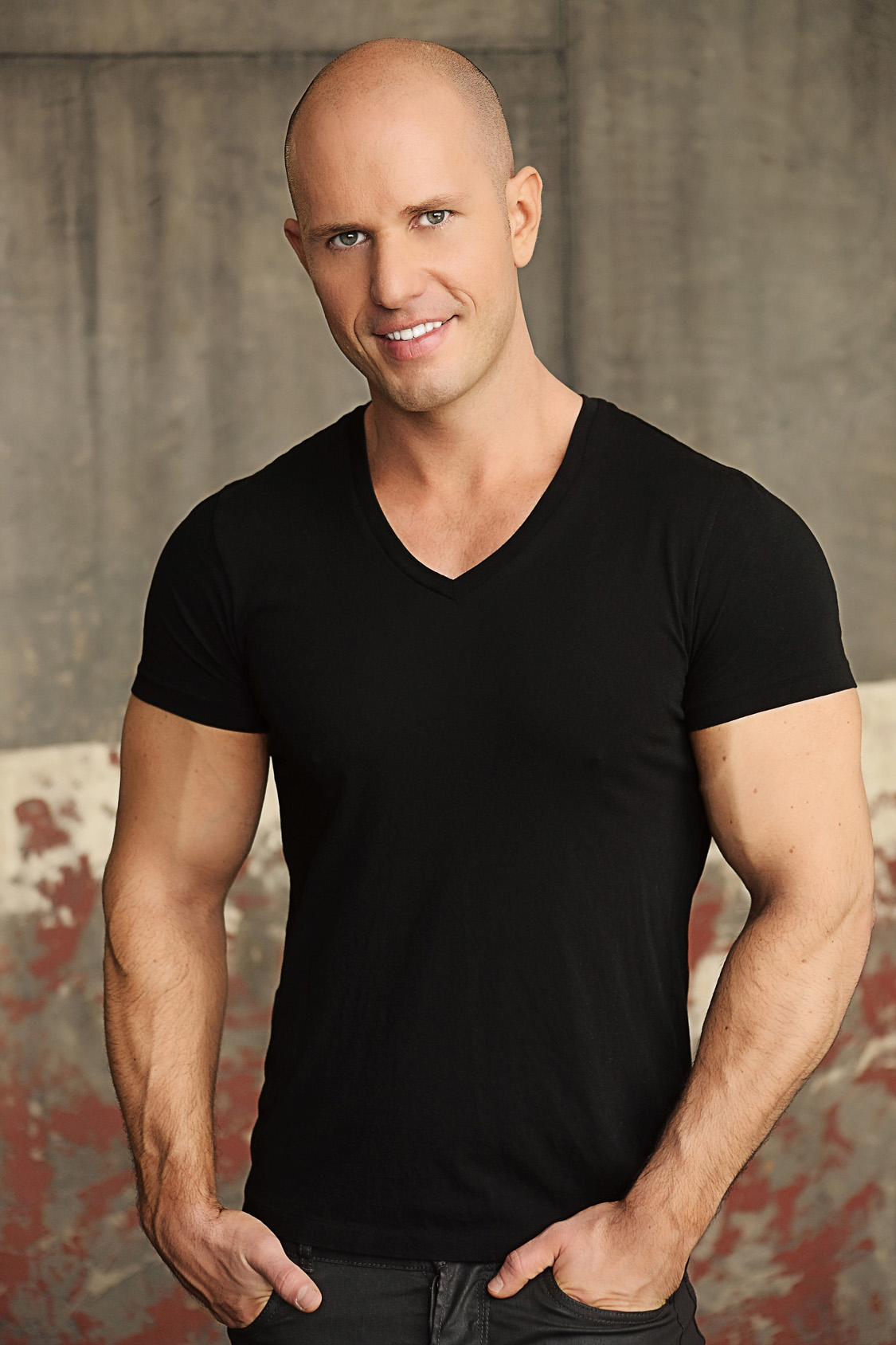
Zachary Gordin, baritone

Zachary Gordin (born November 23, 1979) is an American baritone who performs leading roles in operatic productions and major concert works with orchestras and choruses.

== Early life and training ==
As a child in the San Francisco Bay Area, he displayed a strong interest in classical music, and opera, and at age three he began piano and organ studies. Among his musical influences were his great-grandfather, Verne Clark Gordin, an organist, who encouraged his early musical development. He studied piano and organ during his youth and at age 15, his focus shifted to include harpsichord building and performance. He was the resident harpsichord technician for MusicSources and California State University, Hayward (now California State University, East Bay). After hearing him sing an alto aria before a harpsichord lesson, it was Laurette Goldberg who urged him to pursue singing as a profession. Major voice teachers include Sheri Greenawald, Carol Vaness, and Olivia Stapp.

== Career ==
Gordin began his singing career as a boy soprano soloist in the Golden Gate Boys Choir, making guest appearances in concerts with choruses and churches in the San Francisco Bay Area. When his voice changed, he pursued the countertenor repertoire, performing the role of Oberon in A Midsummer Night's Dream in concert at Berkeley Opera in 2000. He performed recitals around the US and Europe, and other countertenor/sopranist roles in operas, including both Dido and the Sorceress in Dido and Aeneas with Oakland Lyric Opera in 2001, and Wilder in the world premiere of Earthrise (composed by Lewis Spratlan) at San Francisco Opera.

He performed his first baritone role as Escamillo in Carmen at San Francisco Lyric Opera in 2005, and has since built an extensive repertoire, including Enrico in Lucia di Lammermoor (Center Stage Opera, 2005 and North Bay Opera, 2010), Germont in La traviata (West Bay Opera, 2010 and Center Stage Opera, 2010), Aeneas in Dido and Aeneas (West Bay Opera, 2011), Silvio in Pagliacci (Sacramento Opera, 2011), and Count Almaviva in Le Nozze di Figaro (Visalia Opera Company, 2013).

In 2015, Gordin portrayed Joseph De Rocher in Jake Heggie's Dead Man Walking at Dayton Opera, which garnered positive critical responses. He will be reprising the role in the 2016–17 season at Shreveport Opera.

Gordin's recent concert and recital engagements include presentations with San Francisco Symphony, Oakland Symphony, Los Angeles Opera League, Sacramento Philharmonic, YOSA Philharmonic, Bay Area Rainbow Symphony, Olympic Music Festival, Bakersfield Symphony, and others. Some of his notable concert repertoire includes Bach's Cantata #82 "Ich Habe Genug", Monteverdi's Magnificat, Mahler's Kindertotenlieder, Mozart's Coronation Mass and Requiem, Pergolesi's Stabat Mater, and Handel's Messiah.

Orff's Carmina Burana has become a signature piece for Gordin, who has performed the work numerous times. Maestro Michael Morgan of the Oakland Symphony stated that Gordin is "the ideal baritone for Carmina Burana...this is the best singing of the high, sensual music that I have ever heard. This is as good a rendering of those solos as one is ever likely to encounter."

In 2017 Gordin released his first album, Amour sans ailes - Songs of Reynaldo Hahn, on the MSR Classics label. Gordin was appointed artistic director of Festival Opera in 2018.

== Awards ==
Gordin's celebrated vocal technique has won him numerous awards, including the Ibla Grand Prize Baroque Music Competition, Bellini International Voice Competition, Pacific Musical Society Competition, and the East Bay Opera League Competition, amongst others. He was a finalist for the Metropolitan Opera National Council, Pacific Region, and World Finalist for the Academia per Cantanti Lirici at Teatro alla Scala.

== Teaching ==
Gordin operates a private vocal studio in the San Francisco Bay Area. Since 2015, he has served as faculty at Sonoma State University and frequently gives master classes at a variety of opera companies and schools.

== Image as Barihunk ==
Gordin is also widely recognized as the face of the website Barihunks, which celebrates fit and vocally-talented operatic baritones from around the globe. In 2012, he won the "Hottest Male Opera Singer" category in the Operagasm Annual Awards. In 2013, Gordin won a grant from Barihunks to present at Master Class at Center Stage Opera in Los Angeles.

== Critical response ==
"The difficult portrayal of the murderer was done vocally and physically by baritone Zachary Gordin. Covered in temporary tattoos and an Elvis wig, his prodigious Mr. Universe physique was joined with his vocal power. His enigmatic character, his guilt, his feigned innocence, his fear of death were all made clear." The Oakwood Register - Dead Man Walking - Dayton Opera

"Add in 32-year-old American baritone Zachary Gordin, a singer already capable of arresting musical insights, and you have the materials for the superb performance a fortunate audience enjoyed on a gorgeous summer day. Gordin has been busier on the operatic than on the recital stage, so his skill in scaling his voice appropriately to the intimate environment of Quilcene's rustic barn was all the more praiseworthy. The occasional big effects were commanding and intense without ever descending into coarseness, and the delicacy and tonal allure he brought to the cycle's preponderance of quiet songs were deeply impressive. His German diction, too, was exemplary - just as, before intermission, his performance of an attractive set of songs by the Venezuelan-born and French-naturalized Reynaldo Hahn (1874-1947) had shown that the French language too sits convincingly in his voice. " Seattle Times - Dichterliebe and Chansons Griss - Olympic Music Festival

"Gordin is a powerful soloist... he brings a great amount of élan and stage presence to even the slightest turn of phrase or simple cadence. He performed the song cycle with a well-focused sound and absolutely flawless diction." WEKA News - Journey by Sheli Nan

"Zachary Gordin's bull-fighter seemed ready for the prom or the homecoming game... Gordin's Escamillo was a heroic performance." San Francisco Classical Voice - Carmen - San Francisco Lyric Opera

"The third key role is Alfredo's father, Giorgio Germont, portrayed by Zachary Gordin, a young high baritone who adds gravitas and sensitivity as he becomes aware that in breaking up the lovers, he is also witnessing her demise." San Jose Mercury News - La Traviata - West Bay Opera

"Gordin sounds like an exemplar of a fach long thought to be extinct: the uniquely French baryton-martin. Uniting a plush lower octave, smooth navigation of the passaggio, and well-supported falsetto, the baritone sings this music as though he composed the songs himself, projecting a sense of spontaneity even when meticulous care governs his phrasing." "Simply singing—which is not to be confused with singing simply—is what Gordin does best." Amour sans ailes - Voix des Arts

"Gordin's voice is well suited to these songs. Much of his elegant singing is hushed and very tender; he brings an intimate and appropriately dreamy quality to the songs. I've appreciated Hahn's songs since I first discovered them a decade ago and never more than here; Gordin's singing is so intoxicating that I could hardly stop listening." Amour sans ailes - American Record Guide

== Opera repertoire ==
Role	Opera
Don Giovanni	Don Giovanni
Joseph De Rocher	Dead Man Walking
Escamillo	Carmen
El Cantaor	La Vida Breve
Father	The Magic Fish
Argante	Rinaldo
Achilla	Giulio Cesare
Germont	La Traviata
Aeneas	Dido and Aeneas
Silvio	Pagliacci
Enrico	Lucia di Lammermoor
Rodrigo	Don Carlo
Conte di Luna	Il Trovatore
Don Alfonso	Cosi fan tutte
Conte Almaviva	Le Nozze di Figaro
Zurga	Les pêcheurs de perles

== Countertenor roles ==
Giulio Cesare	Giulio Cesare
Sesto	Giulio Cesare
Serse	Serse
Trancredi	Trancredi
Rinaldo	Rinaldo
Dido/Sorceress	Dido and Aeneas
Oberon	A Midsummer Night's Dream
Orfeo	Orfeo ed Euridice
Amore	Orfeo ed Euridice

== Orchestral repertoire ==
Bach	Cantata 82, "Ich habe genug"
Beethoven	Symphony #9
Brahms	Requiem
Duruflé	Requiem
Faure	Requiem
Handel	Judas Maccabaeus
Handel	Messiah
Handel	Samson
Mahler	Kindertotenlieder
Mahler	Das Lied von der Erde
Mendelssohn	Die erste Walpurgisnacht
Mendelssohn	Elijah
Mendelssohn	Magnificat
Mozart	Coronation Mass
Mozart	Requiem
Orff	Carmina Burana
Schubert	Mass in G
Schubert	Psalm 92
Tippett	A Child of Our Time
Vaughan Williams	Dona Nobis Pacem
Vaughan Williams	The House of Life
Vaughan Williams	Songs of Travel

== Selected awards ==
Grantee	Barihunks Charity Calendar - Grant to give a Master Class at Center Stage Opera, LA	2013
Winner	Operagasm Annual Awards: "Hottest Male Opera Singer"	2012
Winner	AEIOU Annual Opera Competition	2011
Winner	Pacific Musical Society Annual Competition. Grand Prize, Senior Division	2006
Winner	East Bay Opera League Vocal Competition	2005
Grantee	Vocal Arts Foundation	2002
Finalist	Metropolitan Opera National Council – Pacific Region	2001
World Finalist	Teatro alla Scala – Academia per Cantati Lirici	1999
Winner	Bellini International Voice Competition	1999
Winner	Ibla Grand Prize Baroque Music Competition	1999
