= Hercules Oetaeus =

1st-century fabula crepidata attributed to Seneca

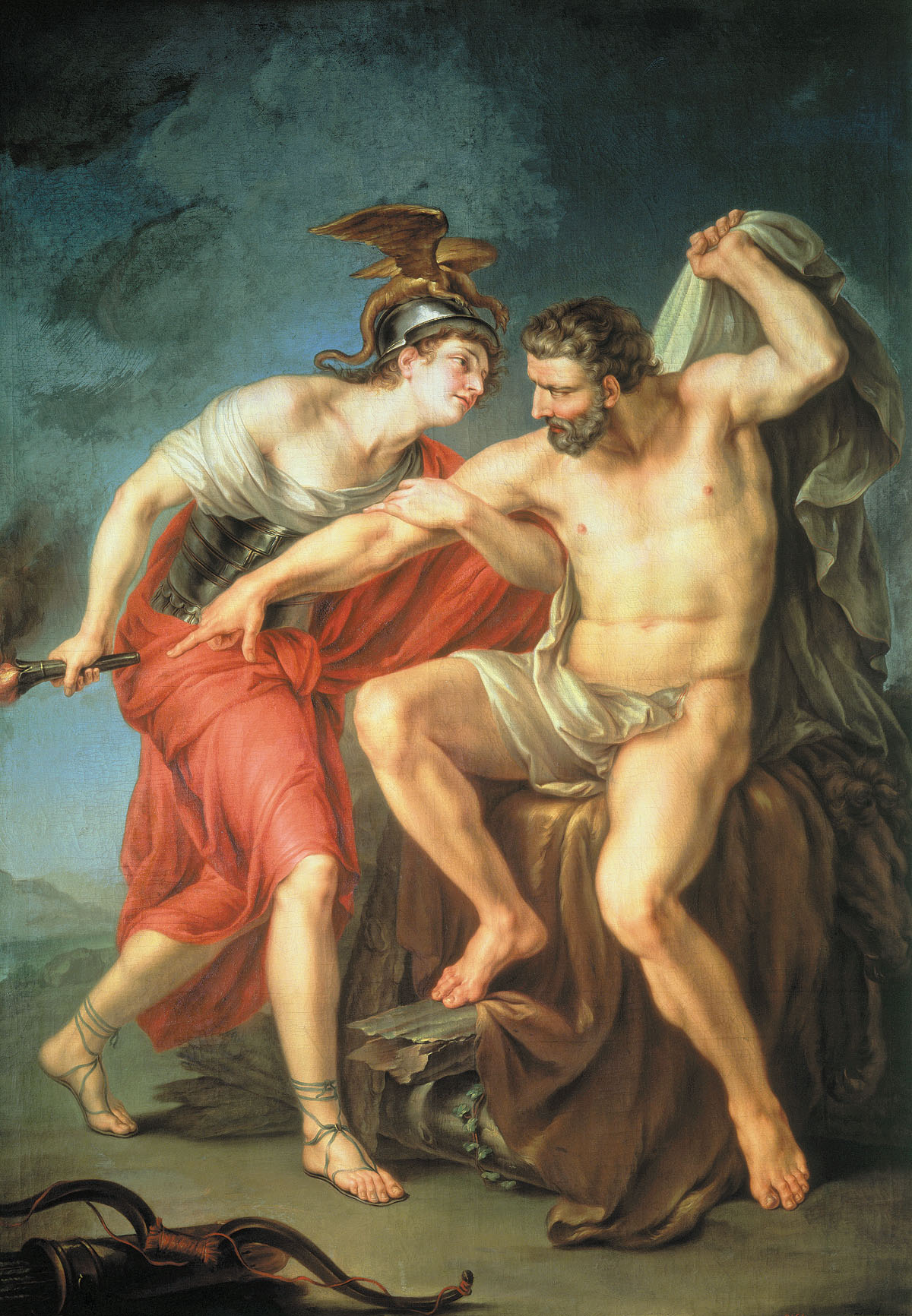
- Hercules on the Pyre looked on by Philoctetes, (Ivan Akimov, 1782)
- Author: Lucius Annaeus Seneca
- Language: Latin
- Genre: Tragedy
- Set in: Euboea, and then Hercules's home in Trachis
- Publication date: 1st century
- Publication place: Rome
- Text: Hercules Oetaeus at Wikisource

Hercules Oetaeus (lit. 'Hercules on Mount Oeta') is a fabula crepidata (Roman tragedy with Greek subject) of c. 1996 lines of verse which survived as one of Lucius Annaeus Seneca's tragedies. It tells the story of Hercules' betrayal by his jealous wife, Deianira, followed by his death and apotheosis. The general opinion is that the play is not Seneca's, but was written in close imitation.

== Authorship ==
The play was first rejected by Daniel Heinsius in the 17th century, and the majority of modern critics agree that the play in its present form is not by Seneca. The work has many small differences in style from Seneca's other plays which "suggest a fundamentally different approach to playwriting". It is also around twice as long as Seneca's other plays, and is in fact the longest drama to survive from antiquity. Hercules Oetaeus contains numerous passages from Seneca's other plays which have been lifted out of context, reworked, and inserted into the play. The play's conclusion contains a strong Stoic theme which is not found in Seneca's other plays. However, there are scholars who defend the play as authentic (albeit hastily written), or argue that a later hand reworked an incomplete fragment. Critics in favour of this view argue that the first third of the play (lines 1–705) could have originally been written by Seneca but that the end of the play is not his.

== Characters ==
- Hercules, Son of Jupiter and Alcmena
- Iole, Daughter of Eurytus, king of Oechalia
- nutrix (nurse)
- Deianeira, Daughter of Oeneus, king of Aetolia, and wife of Hercules
- Hyllus, Son of Hercules and Deianira
- Alcmena, Daughter of Electryon, king of Mycenae
- Philoctetes, A prince of Thessaly, and friend of Hercules
- Lichas (silent role) The messenger of Deianira to Hercules
- Chorus, of Aetolian women, faithful to Deianira.
- Band, of Oechalian women, suffering captivity in company with Iole.

== Plot ==
The life of Hercules has neared its end. His twelve tasks, assigned him by Eurystheus through Juno's hatred, have been done. His latest victory was over Eurytus, king of Oechalia. Hercules slew the king and overthrew his house, because he would not give Hercules his daughter Iole in marriage. And now the hero, having overcome the world, and Pluto's realm beneath the earth, aspires to heaven. He sacrifices to Cenaean Jove, and prays at last to be received into his proper home.

=== Act I ===
The first scene, with the chorus following, is at Euboea, where Hercules, about to offer sacrifices on the promontory of Cenaeum, records his wishes for a place in the heavens, which he recounts and boasts he has deserved. (The rest of the Tragedy takes place at Trachis.)

Iole joining in with the Chorus of Oechalians, bewails the destruction of her country, the slaughter of her father and kinsfolk and lastly, her own position of servitude.

=== Act II ===
Deianira, furious with jealousy having seen Iole, debates revenge with her nurse. She decides to send a garment to Hercules anointed with the blood of the centaur Nessus. She believes that it will act as love charm, but mentions how Nessus told her that the charm must be kept in darkness.

The Chorus of Aetolian women bewail the lot of Deianira, they express their dislike of ambition, avarice, luxury and other frivolous pursuits of mankind, and praise the inferior conditions of life.

=== Act III ===
Deianira repents of her plan when she is acquainted with what danger the poison has brought about, and the calamity, as predicted from its exposure to the sun, has now taken place. Having learned about this from Hyllus, Deianira resolves to kill herself.

The Chorus sings of everything as being subject to Death, regarding the failing strength of Hercules— "that nothing born or created is lasting," which sentiment of Orpheus it praises, and they intersperse the Chorus with celebrating his divine art.

=== Act IV ===
Hercules complains about suffering undeservedly, and that he should be doomed to die an ignominious death, especially one arising out of a woman's treachery. Alcmena consoles Hercules, whilst lamenting his sad fate.

Hyllus having returned, tells Hercules that Deianira, after she found that she had been deceived by Nessus, killed herself.

The Chorus beseeches Phoebus to announce to all the world the death of Hercules: they predict the apotheosis of Hercules, and implore Jupiter, that there may be no more Tyrants, wild beasts or monsters, brought forth in the future, if so, that another Hercules may be forthcoming, as the avenger of such calamities.

=== Act V ===
Philoctetes announces the death and the last disposal of the body of Hercules.

Alcmena grieves about her own downfall, arising out of the death of Hercules. Alcmena, in her grief, chants a funeral dirge.

Hercules, having been raised to the companionship of the gods, consoles his grieving mother, being introduced into this scene by being lowered from the heavens above.

The chorus breathes its thanks for the Apotheosis of Hercules, and is ready to worship the new Deity.

== Sources ==
The first four acts follow the basic structure of Sophocles' play the Women of Trachis. However the scenes which describe Hercules's self-immolation and apotheosis at the end may be derived from Ovid's Metamorphoses (ix. 229-272).
