= Giuseppe Antonio Brescianello =

Giuseppe Antonio Bescianello
- Born: 1690; Bologna
- Died: 4 October 1758 (aged 67–68); Stuttgart
- Occupations: Composer, violinist
- Era: Baroque
- Notable work: 12 concerti e sinfonie, Op. 1

Giuseppe Antonio Brescianello (also Bressonelli; ca. 1690, Bologna, Papal States – 4 October 1758, Stuttgart, Duchy of Württemberg) was an Italian Baroque composer and violinist.

Brescianello's name is mentioned for the first time in a document from 1715 in which Maximilian II Emanuel, Elector of Bavaria conferred on him an appointment as violinist in the court orchestra in Munich. Soon after, in 1716, following the death of Johann Christoph Pez, he was given a post at the court in Stuttgart of Eberhard Ludwig, Duke of Württemberg, as director of music and maître des concerts de la chambre. In 1717, he was appointed Hofkapellmeister. Around 1718, he composed the pastorale opera La Tisbe, which he dedicated to the Archduke in the vain hope that it would be programmed at the Stuttgart theatre.

Between 1719 and 1721, Brescianello came into conflict with the composer Reinhard Keiser, who launched repeated attempts to seize his post. He held out and in 1731 was even granted the more senior title of Oberkapellmeister. He temporarily lost the post in 1737, when the court opera was disbanded due to financial troubles. In the following years, he concentrated on composition and produced his 12 concerti e sinphonie op. 1, as well as the 18 Pieces for gallichone (gallichone here means mandora, a type of lute). In 1744, the court's financial situation improved and Brescianello was reappointed Oberkapellmeister by Duke Karl Eugen in consideration of "his special knowledge of music and excellent skills". He remained principal director of music for the court and its opera house until 1751, when he was eventually granted a pension (until 1755). His successors in the role were Ignaz Holzbauer and then Niccolò Jommelli.

== List of selected works ==
- 12 concerti e sinphonie op. 1 (Amsterdam, 1738)
- I concerti a 3
- About 15 trio sonatas in various arrangements
- 18 Pieces for gallichon
- Sinfonia a 4
- various sinfonias concertanti and concertos
- La Tisbe (Opera pastorale), 1717–18
- Missa solenne (four voices)
- 2 cantatas Sequir fera che fugge and Core amante di perche

=== Selected recordings ===
- Tisbe Nina Bernsteiner, Flavio Ferri-Benedetti, Julius Pfeifer, Matteo Bellotto, Jörg Halubek, l Gusto Barocco CPO 2014
- Behind Closed Doors, Brescianello Vol. 1 Adrian Chandler, La Serenissima, SIGCD693
- Unlocked, Brescianello Vol. 2 Adrian Chandler, La Serenissima, SIGCD767
