= Jörg Halubek =

German musician and conductor

Jörg Halubek (born 1977) is a German conductor, harpsichordist, organist and professor.

== Life and career ==
Born in Beckum, Halubek studied church music, historical keyboard instruments, and historically informed performance at the conservatories in Stuttgart, Freiburg and the Schola Cantorum Basiliensis. His teachers were Jon Laukvik, Robert Hill, Andrea Marcon and Jesper Bøje Christensen.

In 2004, he won first prize as an organist at the International Johann Sebastian Bach Competition in Leipzig.

In 2008, Halubeck founded the Stuttgart Baroque Orchestra il Gusto Barocco with a performance of Bach's The Art of Fugue at the European Music Festival Stuttgart. In the 2009/2010 season, Halubek took over the musical assistance of the co-production of Antonio Vivaldi's Juditha triumphans of the Stuttgart State Opera and the Salzburg Festival and conducted several performances at the Stuttgart Schauspielhaus.

In 2010, he conducted il Gusto Barocco in Stuttgart Handel's oratorio The Triumph of Time and Truth in a staged performance in the church hall. This was followed, in 2012, by the world premiere of Giuseppe Antonio Brescianello's pastoral opera La Tisbe, composed in 1718, and in 2016 by the world premiere of Johann David Heinichen's Flavio Crispo.

At the Staatstheater Kassel, Halubek took over the musical direction of Scarlatti's Griselda (2012), Vivaldi's L'Olimpiade (2013) Handel's Saul (2013), Christoph Willibald Gluck's Iphigénie en Tauride (2014), Leonardo Vinci's Artaserse (2015), Los Elementos by Antonio de Literes and Antigona by Tommaso Traetta. At the Oldenburgisches Staatstheater, as a specialist in baroque music, he has performed Handel's operas Hercules, Serse and Agrippina. Since 2016/2017, Halubek has been creating a four-part Monteverdi cycle with il Gusto Barocco at the Nationaltheater Mannheim. In 2016/2017, he conducted Il ritorno d'Ulisse in patria, followed in 2017/2018 by L'incoronazione di Poppea.

After teaching assignments and professorships at the conservatories in Karlsruhe, Stuttgart, Trossingen and Linz (A), Halubek has been a professor for organ and historical keyboard instruments at the State University of Music and Performing Arts Stuttgart since 2016.

At the Innsbruck Festival of Early Music in 2017, he directed Reinhard Keiser's Die edelmütige Octavia with prize-winners of the Cesti Competition. In June 2017, he guest conducted Tommaso Traetta's Antigona with international artists such as Goshka Macuga and Gareth Pugh at the Staatstheater Kassel as a reference to documenta 14. In 2018, he conducted the opening premiere of the Handel Festival, Halle, Handel's Berenice.

Since 2018 Halubek has been working on a complete recording of J. S. Bach's organ works on original instruments. In July 2018, he was invited with il Gusto Barocco as festival orchestra to the Bachwoche Ansbach.

In 2018/2019, he continued his engagement in Kassel with scenic Bach cantatas and also performed a scenic interpretation of the Vespro della Beata Vergine under the direction of Calixto Bieito at the Mannheim National Theatre as the third part of the Monteverdi cycle. In March 2019, Halubek made his guest debut at the Komische Oper Berlin with Handel's opera Poro, re dell'Indie in a production by Harry Kupfer.

In 2020, Jörg Halubek and il gusto Barocco founded the Stuttgart series, which presents baroque operas, chamber music, and organ music in different formats. In its second year, the event series was condensed into the Baroque Festival Week.

== Prizes ==
- 2004: 1st prize (organ), International Johann Sebastian Bach Competition Leipzig
- 2014: Diapason d'Or for Carl Philipp Emanuel Bach: Works for Keyboard and Violin. PAN Classicas
- 2016: Diapason d'or de l'année 2016 for Johann Sebastian Bach: Sei Sonate à Cembalo certato e Violino solo, with Leila Schayegh (baroque violin). Glossa
- 2016: Editor's Choice for J.S. Bach: Sei Sonate à Cembalo certato e Violino solo, with Leila Schayegh (Baroque violin). Glossa
- 2016: Bestenliste der Deutschen Schallplattenkritik for J.S. Bach: Sei Sonate à Cembalo certato e Violino solo, with Leila Schayegh (Baroque violin). Glossa

== Recordings ==
- Organo pleno, organ works by J. S. Bach at the Silbermannorgel zu Rötha. 2006.
- Bernardo Storaces harpsichord and organ works. SWR/cpo, 2006
- Passacaglia, works for harpsichord by Bach, Frescobaldi, Ligeti and others. mvh, 2007.
- Giovanni Mossi: Violin Sonatas, with Leila Schayegh (baroque violin). Pan, 2008.
- Canzone e Cantate, with Franco Fagioli (countertenor). SWR/Carus, 2010.
- Jean-Marie Leclair & his Rivals, with Leila Schayegh (baroque violin). Pan, 2012.
- Carl Philipp Emanuel Bach Works for Keyboard and Violin, with Leila Schayegh (baroque violin). Pan, 2014.
- Giuseppe Antonio Brescianello: Tisbe, Baroque Opera, with il Gusto Barocco. SWR/cpo, 2012.
- J. S. Bach: Sei Suonate à Cembalo certato è Violiono solo, with Leila Schayegh (baroque violin). Glossa, 2016.
- Johann David Heinichen: Flavio Crispo, baroque opera, with il Gusto Barocco. SWR/cpo, 2018.
- Johann Sebastian Bach: Bach Organ Landscapes, Third Part of the Clavierübung, Waltershausen. Berlin Classics 2019.
- Johann Sebastian Bach: Bach Organ Landscapes, Eighteen Chorales, Ansbach. Berlin Classics, 2019.
- Claudio Monteverdi: Vespro della beate vergine, with il Gusto Barocco. SWR/cpo, 2019.
- J. S. Bach: Brandenburg Concertos, mit il Gusto Barocco. Berlin Classics, 2021.
- J. S. Bach: Bach Organ Landscapes, Organ Booklet, Choral Partitas, Lüneburg & Hamburg. Berlin Classics, 2021.
- J. S. Bach: Bach Organ Landscapes, Early Works I, Hamburg. Berlin Classics, 2021.
- J. S. Bach: Suite & Concertos, with il Gusto Barocco. Berlin Classics, 2022.
