= Carlo Caproli =

Italian composer

Carlo Caproli or Caprioli (c. 1614 – 1668), also called Carlo del Violino, was an Italian violinist, organist, and a leading composer of cantatas in mid-17th-century Italy.

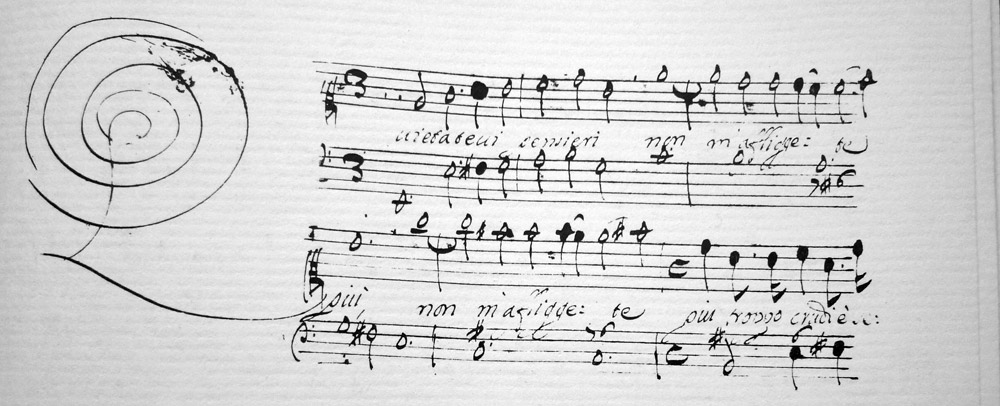
Excerpt from the cantata Quietatevi pensieri by Carlo Caproli

== Life ==
=== Early life and career ===
Carlo Caproli was born in Rome. His father (originally from Poli) was a seller of green vegetables (erbarolo).

He was recorded as Carlo del Violino in 1636, when he was engaged by the Barberini family for performances of Santa Teodora (with a text by Giulio Rospigliosi). Caproli was considered to be a maestro di cappella beginning in 1638, and was in charge of the music for the festival of the patron saint of San Girolamo degli Schiavoni up to 1643.

He was an organist under Giacomo Carissimi at the Collegio Germanico beginning in September 1643 and held the post until 1645. On 15 November 1644 he was appointed aiutante di camera under Cardinal Camillo Pamphili, but left that position in April 1647. He first appeared at San Luigi dei Francesi on 25 August 1652 as a violinist hired for the occasion.

Caproli's wife was related to the Roman publisher Agostino Mascardi.

=== Paris ===
In November 1653, Caproli and his wife went to Paris, where he was commissioned by Cardinal Mazarin to compose the opera Le nozze di Peleo e di Theti (music lost) with an Italian libretto by Mazarin and Francesco Buti. The premiere, which included ballet intermèdes with a French text by Isaac de Benserade and music by uncredited French composers, was given on 14 April 1654 at the Théâtre du Petit-Bourbon with decors by Giacomo Torelli. The 15-year-old King Louis XIV appeared in no fewer than six roles. The production received nine performances, the final two open to the public, and it was considered a great success, although this was primarily due to the French ballets in the intervals. For his efforts, Caproli was made maître de la musique du cabinet du Roy, which suggests he may have directed the performances.

=== Later career in Rome ===
Caproli returned to Rome in 1655. He again directed the music for the festival of San Girolamo and, as one of the best violinists in the city, made numerous appearances, including at San Luigi dei Francesi, Santa Maria Maggiore, and Santa Maria del Popolo, where he played for the Vespers of 8 September. In 1665 he took up the post of guardiano of the instrumentalists at the Congregazione dei Musici di Roma (later the Accademia di Santa Cecilia). He composed numerous solo and ensemble cantatas, many with instruments, and several oratorios.

Caproli died in Rome just before 20 December 1668, the day on which his will was opened.

== Works ==
=== Stage works ===
- Le nozze di Peleo e di Theti, opera (commedia), text by Francesco Buti, music lost; performed Paris, Petit Bourbon, 14 April 1654
- 4 oratorios, lost, one with text by Caproli; performed Rome, Oratory of Santissimo Crocifisso, 1650, 1665, 1667
- David' prevaricante e poi pentito, oratorio, text by Lelio Orsini, dated 1683; score in Vienna, Österreichische Nationalbibliothek, no. 16272

=== Cantatas ===
Number of voices, accompaniment, and location of the score are given in parentheses after the title. According to Eleanor Caluori, many of these catatas are incorrectly attributed to Francesco Mannelli in the first edition of Die Musik in Geschichte und Gegenwart.

- A fuggir, a seguir beltà tiranna (one voice, basso continuo; Rome, Biblioteca Casanatense)
- Amor, deggio io servir (three voices, basso continuo; Bologna, Civico Museo Bibliografico Musicale)
- Bella Filli, io partirò (two voices, basso continuo; London, British Library)
- Chi d’amor si vuol difendere (one voice, basso continuo; Oxford, Faculty of Music Library)
- Chi non sa qual tormento (three voices; Bologna, Civico Museo Bibliografico Musicale)
- Chi può Nina mirare (one voice, basso continuo; Paris, Bibliothèque nationale de France; edition by Henry Prunières)
- Chi sempre disse no (two voices, basso continuo; Bologna, Civico Museo Bibliografico Musicale)
- Chi vuol esser amante (three voices; Bologna, Civico Museo Bibliografico Musicale)
- Ci volea questo di più (one voice, basso continuo; Paris, Geneviève Thibault, private collection in BnF)
- Con fronte sicura (one voice, basso continuo; Oxford, Faculty of Music Library)
- Conoscer quando inganna (one voice, basso continuo; Naples, Conservatorio di Musica San Pietro a Majella, Biblioteca)
- Con piede lento giungon l’hore (three voices, basso continuo; Biblioteca Apostolica Vaticana)
- Con voi parlo, amanti (one voice, basso continuo; Rome, Conservatorio di Musica Santa Cecilia)
- Correte, amanti, a rimirar (three voices, basso continuo; Bologna, Civico Museo Bibliografico Musicale)
- Dallo strale d’amor (two voices, basso continuo; Bologna, Civico Museo Bibliografico Musicale)
- Di Cupido è legge antica (one voice, basso continuo; Rome, Conservatorio di Musica Santa Cecilia)
- Di sue bellezze altera, text by Domenico Benigni (one soprano, basso continuo; Paris, Bibliothèque nationale de France; Rome, Conservatorio di Musica Santa Cecilia)
- Dite che far poss’io (one voice, basso continuo; Naples, Conservatorio di Musica San Pietro a Majella, Biblioteca, no.16796 [two settings])
- E dove, Eurillo, il passo (two voices, basso continuo; Bologna, Civico Museo Bibliografico Musicale)
- E pur tornate a dirmi, text by F. Melosi (one voice, basso continuo; Biblioteca Apostolica Vaticana)
- E quando ve n’andate, speranze (one voice, basso continuo; Oxford, Faculty of Music Library)
- Era condotto a morte (one voice, basso continuo; Bologna, Civico Museo Bibliografico Musicale)
- E un gran foco (one voice, basso continuo; Naples, Conservatorio di Musica San Pietro a Majella, Biblioteca)
- Fate largo alla speranza (one voice, basso continuo; Rome, Biblioteca Nazionale Centrale Vittorio Emanuele II)
- Ferma il piè, taci (one voice, basso continuo; Naples, Conservatorio di Musica San Pietro a Majella, Biblioteca)
- Frondosi e verdi boschi, text by Conte Barbazza (one voice, basso continuo; Paris, Bibliothèque nationale de France)
- Gia languide le stelle (three voices, basso continuo; Bologna, Civico Museo Bibliografico Musicale)
- Giurai cangiar pensiero (one voice, basso continuo; Rome, Biblioteca Casanatense)
- Hanno da durar più (one voice, basso continuo; Venice, Conservatorio di Musica Benedetto Marcello, Biblioteca)
- Ho desio di saper (two voices, basso continuo; Bologna, Civico Museo Bibliografico Musicale)
- Hor ch’ho sentito un si (one voice, basso continuo; London, British Library);
- Hor ch’il gelido rigor (two voices, basso continuo; Bologna, Civico Museo Bibliografico Musicale)
- Hor ch’l ciel di stelle adorno (three voices, basso continuo; Bologna, Civico Museo Bibliografico Musicale)
- Il cor sempre costante (one voice, basso continuo; Naples, Conservatorio di Musica San Pietro a Majella, Biblioteca)
- Infelice chi crede a i sospiri (one voice, basso continuo; Rome, Conservatorio di Musica Santa Cecilia)
- Io che tra muti horrori, text by F. Melosi, serenade (one voice, basso continuo; Bologna, Civico Museo Bibliografico Musicale)
- Io mi struggo in lento foco (one voice, basso continuo; Rome, Conservatorio di Musica Santa Cecilia)
- Io non so che cosa m’habbia (one voice, basso continuo; Rome, Biblioteca Casanatense)
- In questa oscuritade horrida (one voice, basso continuo; Cambridge, King's College, Rowe Music Library)
- Languia Filen trafitto (one voice, basso continuo; Biblioteca Apostolica Vaticana)
- Le note ove son chiusi, text by Marini (two voices, basso continuo; Bologna, Civico Museo Bibliografico Musicale)
- Lidio, invano presumi (one voice, basso continuo), 1679
- Lilla, con gran ragione, text by Melosi (one voice, basso continuo; Bologna, Civico Museo Bibliografico Musicale)
- Mene contento, non ricuso pena (one voice, basso continuo; Rome, Biblioteca Casanatense)
- Mi è stato detto che al foco (one voice, basso continuo; Naples, Conservatorio di Musica San Pietro a Majella, Biblioteca)
- Mondo, non mi chiamar (one voice, basso continuo; Vienna, Österreichische Nationalbibliothek)
- Morto voi mi bramate, text by G. Lotti (2 voices, basso continuo; Modena, Biblioteca Estense e Universitaria)
- Navicella ch’a bel vento (four voices, basso continuo; Bologna, Civico Museo Bibliografico Musicale; edited version with three voices in L'arte musicale in Italia)
- Non fuggir quando mi vedi (one voice, basso continuo; London, British Library)
- Non si può dir di no (one voice, basso continuo; Paris, Geneviève Thibault, private collection in BnF)
- Non si può più sperare (three voices; Bologna, Civico Museo Bibliografico Musicale)
- Non si tema il mar infido (one voice, basso continuo; 1v, bc, Oxford, Christ Church Library)
- Non ti fidar, mio core (two voices, basso continuo; Rome, Biblioteca Casanatense)
- Non voglio far altro che chiuder (one voice, basso continuo; Naples, Conservatorio di Musica San Pietro a Majella, Biblioteca)
- Non voglio più lite (one voice, basso continuo; Oxford, Faculty of Music Library)
- Occhi audaci, che fate (two voices, basso continuo; Modena, Biblioteca Estense e Universitaria)
- Occhi miei, voi parlate (two voices, basso continuo; Rome, Biblioteca Casanatense)
- O da me adorata tant’anni (one voice, basso continuo; Vienna, Österreichische Nationalbibliothek)
- Oppresso un cor da mille pene (one voice, basso continuo; Naples, Conservatorio di Musica San Pietro a Majella, Biblioteca)
- O questa si ch'è bella, text by S. Baldini (soprano, basso continuo; Paris, Bibliothèque nationale de France)
- Par ch’il core melo dica (one voice, basso continuo; Naples, Conservatorio di Musica San Pietro a Majella, Biblioteca)
- Per l’Egeo di spuma grave (three voices, basso continuo; Bologna, Civico Museo Bibliografico Musicale)
- Poiche fissato il guardo (one voice, basso continuo; London, British Library)
- Purche lo sappi tu, text attributed to S. Baldini (two sopranos, basso continuo; Bologna, Civico Museo Bibliografico Musicale)
- Quella luce che s’indori (two voices, basso continuo; Bologna, Civico Museo Bibliografico Musicale)
- Qui dove il piè fermai, serenade (three voices, bv; Venice, Conservatorio di Musica Benedetto Marcello, Biblioteca)
- Quietatevi, pensieri, io vo dormire, text by Francesco Buti (one voice, basso continuo; Naples, Conservatorio di Musica San Pietro a Majella, Biblioteca), 1646 or earlier
- Quietatevi, pensieri, non m’affligete più (one voice, basso continuo; Rome, Biblioteca Casanatense)
- Rido una volta in cento (one voice, basso continuo; Oxford, Christ Church Library)
- Tu mancavi a tormentarmi (one voice, basso continuo; Rome, Biblioteca Casanatense)
- Tutto cinto di ferro, text by Melosi (one voice, basso continuo; Bologna, Civico Museo Bibliografico Musicale)
- Una bella che bella non è (one voice, basso continuo; Cambridge, King's College, Rowe Music Library)
- Un tiranno dolore non vuol partir (three voices, basso continuo; Paris, Bibliothèque nationale de France)
- Un cor impiegato si sente morire (three voices; Bologna, Civico Museo Bibliografico Musicale)
- Uscitemi dal seno, amorosi pensieri (one voice, basso continuo; Rome, Biblioteca Casanatense)
- Vanne pur lungi speranza, text by Domenico Benigni (one voice, basso continuo; Modena, Biblioteca Estense e Universitaria)
- Ve la potrei dipingere (one voice, basso continuo; Rome, Biblioteca Casanatense)
- Voglio ridere pur di cuore (one voice, basso continuo; Stuttgart, Württembergische Landesbibliothek)
- Voi del sole che piangete (one voice, basso continuo; Bologna, Civico Museo Bibliografico Musicale)

=== Aria ===
- Non si puo dir di no (soprano, basso continuo; Paris, Bibliothèque nationale de France)

== Bibliography ==
- Affortunato, Tiziana (2008). "Nuove fonti documentarie su Carlo Caproli del Violino (Roma, 1614-1668)", Fonti Musicali Italiane, vol. 13, pp. 7–17. ISSN 1594-7963.
- Bianconi, Lorenzo; Murata, Margaret (2001). "Castelli, Ottaviano" in Sadie 2001.
- Bjurström, Per (1962). Giacomo Torelli and Baroque Stage Design, 2nd revised edition, translated from the Swedish. Stockholm: Almqvist & Wiksell. OCLC 10226792.
- Caluori, Eleanor (1992). "Caproli [Caprioli, Del Violino], Carlo" in Sadie 1992. Also at Oxford Music Online (subscription required).
- Caluori, Eleanor (2001). "Caproli [Caprioli, Del Violino], Carlo" in Sadie 2001. Also at Oxford Music Online (subscription required).
- Sadie, Julie Anne (1990). Companion to Baroque Music. London: Macmillan. New York: Schirmer. ISBN 9780028722757.
- Sadie, Stanley, editor (1992). The New Grove Dictionary of Opera (4 volumes). London: Macmillan. ISBN 9781561592289.
- Sadie, Stanley, editor (2001). The New Grove Dictionary of Music and Musicians, 2nd edition. London: Macmillan. ISBN 9781561592395 (hardcover). OCLC 419285866 (eBook).
