= Yvonne Rokseth =

French composer, writer, and medieval music researcher (1890–1948)

Yvonne Rihouet Rokseth (17 July 1890 – 23 August 1948) was a French composer, musicologist, organist, violinist, and writer. She was active in the French resistance during World War II and is best known for her research on medieval music.

== Life and career ==
Rokseth was born in Maisons-Laffitte. Her father was a law officer at the appellate court in Paris. She studied music at the Paris Conservatory, the Schola Cantorum, and the Sorbonne. Her teachers included Abel Decaux, Vincent d'Indy, Andre Pirro, and Albert Roussel. Her dissertation was entitled La musique d'orgue au XV^{e} siècle et au début du XVI^{e} (Organ Music of the 15th and Early 16th Centuries). The Schola Cantorum awarded a prize for her composition Fantasy for Piano and Orchestra.

In 1918, Rokseth had a daughter, Odile Ledieu. In 1925, she married the Norwegian literary scholar Peter Hjalmar Rokseth, and they had two daughters, Anne-Cécile and Ève-Marie.

In 1921, Rokseth began working as an organist at the Lutheran Church of the Resurrection in Paris, later moving to be the organist for a Danish church nearby. In 1933, she became a librarian at the Paris Conservatory.

In 1937, Rokseth discovered a previously unpublished work by Antonia Bembo (c 1640 - c 1720), Les Sept Pseaumes de David. That year, she also began teaching musicology at the University of Strasbourg. Her students included Pauline Alderman and Jacques Chailley. She started a choir there in 1939, played viola and piano, and organized concerts. During World War II, Rokseth hid (probably Jewish) students in her apartment, distributed pamphlets for the French Resistance, and allowed radio programs for the Resistance to be transmitted from her apartment. She was later awarded a medal for her work during the war.

In 1948, Rokseth was awarded the Medaille du Concours des Antiquites de la France for her four-volume work Polyphonies du XIIIe Siecle [Polyphony of the 13th Century]. She published several books and many articles about musicology, including 47 book reviews. Rokseth died in Strasbourg in 1948.

Rokseth's works were published by Éditions de l'Oiseau-Lyre and the Société française de musicologie. Her publications include:

== Articles and books ==
- 47 book reviews
- Articles for academic journals
- Polyphonies du XIIIe Siecle (four volumes)
- Tabulature pour le jeu d'orgues (by anonymous; edited by Rokseth)
- Deux livres d'orgue (originally published by Pierre Attaingnant; edited by Rokseth)

== Compositions ==
=== Chamber music ===
- Piano Quintet
- Sonata for Violin
- String Quartet

=== Keyboard ===
- Organ and piano pieces

=== Orchestra ===
- Fantasy (piano and orchestra)

=== Vocal ===
- Cantata Lamentation de la vièrge au pied de la croix (transcription of a 13th-century work)
- Oratorio Te Deum (c. 1925, solo voices, choir, organ and orchestra)
- Songs
