= Ars Minerva =

Opera company in San Francisco

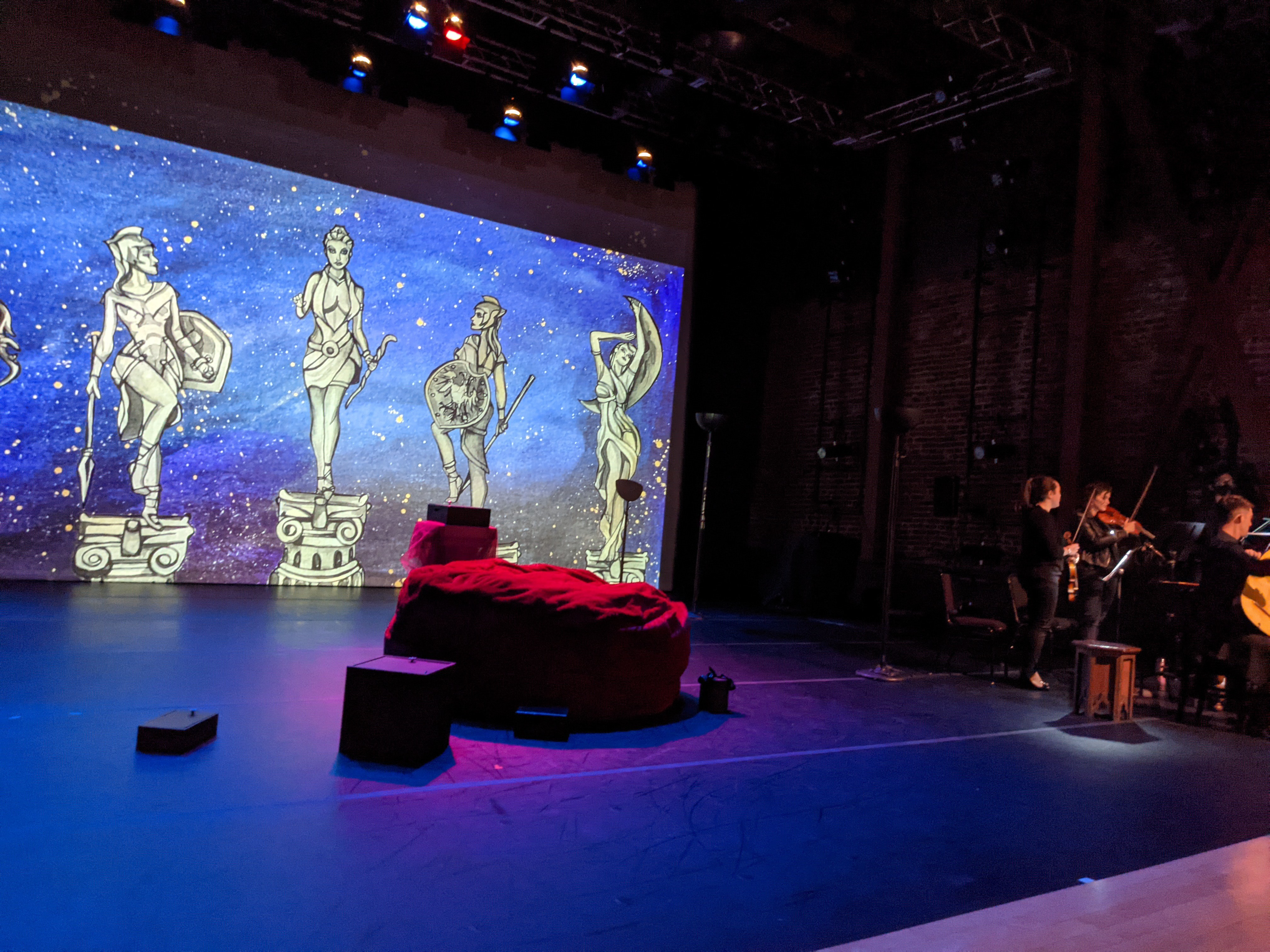
Photo of the stage set for the Ars Minerva production of Messalina

Ars Minerva is an American opera company founded in 2013 by mezzo-soprano Céline Ricci. It is based in San Francisco, California. The company, run as a non-profit organization, produces little-known Baroque Italian operas researched by the founding director. They have been well received by audiences and critics.

== Programming ==
=== 2015 ===
La Cleopatra (1662) by Daniele da Castrovillari, libretto by Giacomo dall'Angelo.

Cleopatra was performed at the Marines Memorial Theater in San Francisco, with the title role sung by Céline Ricci and Marc Antonio by countertenor Randall Scotting.

=== 2016 ===
The Amazons in the Fortunate Isles, or Le Amazone nelle Isole Fortunate (1679) by Carlo Pallavicino, libretto by C.M. Piccioli.

The modern premiere of Amazons by Ars Minerva opened in May 2016. The opera had not been produced since its initial opening in 1679.

=== 2017 ===
La Circe (1665) by Pietro Andrea Ziani, libretto by Cristoforo Ivanovich.

This production was given a circus-like staging at the ODC Theater in San Francisco.

=== 2018 ===
Ifigenia en Aulide (1738) by Giovanni Porta.

This was the first 18th century opera the company produced. Soprano Aura Veruni sang the title role, with countertenor Matheus Coura as Teurco and Céline Ricci as Achille.

=== 2019 ===
Ermelinda (1680), composed by Domenico Freschi, libretto by Francesco Maria Piccioli. This romantic Venetian opera is set in ancient Phoenecia. The title role was sung by soprano Nikola Printz.

=== 2021 ===
Messalina, composed by Carlo Pallavicino, libretto by Francesco Maria Piccioli.

This production of the little known 17th century Venetian opera, a complicated farce with scenes in brothels and bathhouses, featured Aura Veruni in the title role, with Deborah Rosengaus as the Emperor Claudio, Shawnette Sulker as Floralba, and Kindra Schacter as Erginda.
