= Antonia Bembo =

Italian composer

Antonia Padoani Bembo (c. 1640 – c. 1720) was a Venetian composer and singer.

== Life ==
Antonia Padoani Bembo was born in Venice around 1640 as the only daughter of Giacomo Padoani (1603–1666), a doctor, and Diana Paresco (1609–1676). In 1659, she married the Venetian noble Lorenzo Bembo (1637–1703), with whom she had three children. Her husband left her and her children for five years on military duty without providing them any means to survive. She brought him to court over this and relocated to Paris in 1677, with the help of Francesco Corbetta. There, she sang for Louis XIV. Louis granted her a pension and housing at the Petite Union Chrétienne des Dames de Saint Chaumont, a religious community. She died in Paris around 1720

She was a contemporary of Élisabeth Jacquet de La Guerre and Barbara Strozzi.

== Works ==
Bembo was taught by Francesco Cavalli (who also taught Barbara Strozzi), and wrote in all the major genres of the time, including opera, secular and sacred cantatas, and petit and grand motets. Her work displays a combination of French and Italian styles, using Italian virtuoso elements alongside French dance forms. Much of her work is for soprano voice with continuo accompaniment. Bembo's large scale works include two Te Deum settings and the opera Ercole amante (1707), the latter set to a libretto by Francesco Buti.

Six volumes of Bembo's music survive in manuscript form at the Bibliothèque nationale de France. The first collection is dedicated to Louis XIV and entitled, Produzioni Armoniche della Dama Bembo, nobile veneta, consacrate al nome immortale di Luigi XIIII il grande, rè di Francia e di Navarra ("Harmonic Productions of the Lady Bembo, Venetian noblewoman, dedicated to the immortal name of Louis XIV the great, king of France and of Navarre").

In Bembo's first collection, there are five songs are set to Latin text, one to French (no. 40), and thirty-four to Italian. Since she was a soprano, her vocal compositions are mostly in higher register and characterized by fioratura. Thirty-two of them are supplied with simple figured-bass accompaniments (nos. 1, 6-13, 15-17, 20-32, 34-40). Two other soprano airs have an accompaniment for two violins and figured bass (nos. 2 and 5); one air requires only a single violin with the bass (no. 3). There are two duets for sopranos (nos. 4 and 19); one trio for two sopranos and tenor accompanied by two violins, basso continuo, and instrumental prelude (no. 14); one duet for soprano and tenor (no. 18); and one duet for soprano and bass (no. 33) complete the collection.

The second collection is dedicated to Marie-Adélaïde of Savoy, Duchess of Burgundy, on the occasion of the birth of the first Duke of Brittany in 1704. It contains a three-voice Te Deum and a five-voice Italian serenata (‘un picciolo divertimento’), which show her compositional techniques of musical structure, melodic application and harmonic progression. The third collection contains two motets, and a second Te Deum, written for a five-voice setting, (a grand motet in the style of Lully and Lalande; ed. W. W. Führlinger, Altötting, 1999). The musical style of last four collections rely heavily on French influences, suggesting that Bembo lived in France for many years.

=== Te Deum (3 voices) ===
The three-part Te Deum is written for three vocal parts: two sopranos and a bass, with two violin parts and figured bass. It stays in the key of E minor from the beginning, which dominates until the end, but with long passages in neighboring keys: successively, C major (Te ceternum), B minor (Sanctus), F-sharp minor, A major, E minor (Tu rex), G major, B-flat major (Aeterna fac), D minor (Per singulos dies), A minor (Miserere nostri), E minor (In te Domine).

The Te Deum is followed by a large five-part chorus orchestra.

=== Te Deum (5 voices) ===
Compared to the three-part Te Deum, the writing of the five-part Te Deum is skillful and represents a high degree of musical training and techniques, with its musical language deemed complex and challenging.

=== Ercole Amante ===
Ercole Amante (Hercules in Love) encapsulate Bembo's fourth and fifth volumes of manuscript. The opera was originally set by Francesco Cavalli in 1662, and there is little information as to why Bembo chose to reset the libretto by Francesco Buti, based on The Trachiniae by Sophocles. There is no evidence of this opera receiving a premiere during Bembo's lifetime, but it has experienced modern resurgence, receiving premieres in Stuttgart, San Francisco, and most recently at the Opéra de Paris.

=== Les sept Pseaumes de David ===
Les sept Pseaumes de David (using the historical French spelling of "psalms") comprise the entirety of the sixth and final manuscript found by Yvonne Rokseth in 1937. The music is set to seven paraphrases of penitential psalms in French by Elisabeth Sophie Chéron. It was quite in fashion during the late 17th century for Parisians to read psalms in French, and Chéron's Essay de pseaumes from 1694 found a successful audience. The seven psalms feature varied instrumentation, from solo voice setting to vocal quartet, but maintain consistency with two melody instruments and a basso continuo.

== List of selected works ==
- Produzioni armoniche, 41 arias and cantatas in Italian, French, and Latin. (vol. I) (1701)
- Te Deum for 3 voices (vol. II, dedicated to Marie Adélaïde of Savoy in 1704)
- Serenata for 5 voices (vol. II)
- 2 mottetti (vol. III)
- Te Deum for 5 voices (vol. III)
- Salmo XIX, for 3 voices (vol. III)
- Ercole amante, opera set to a libretto by Francesco Buti (1707) (vols. IV-V)
- Les sept pseaumes de David (vol. VI) (Seven Psalms of David)

== Recordings ==
- 12 soprano cantatas Clizia Amnate Del Sole, Habbi Pieta Di Me, Volgete Altrovi Il Guardo. Maria Jonas Convoce Coeln (Alpha)
- 41 complete Produzioni Armoniche 3CD Armonia delle Sfere (Tactus)
- The Seven Psalms of David, Vol. I (2004), Cleveland Voices Laury Gutierrez La Donna Musicale
- The Seven Psalms of David, Vol. II (2005), La Donna Musicale

The texts for these psalms were written by Élisabeth Sophie Chéron.

- L'Ercole amante - Gusto Barocco, Halubek 2023
