= Johann David Heinichen =

German composer and music theorist

- Born: April 17, 1683; Teuchern, Holy Roman Empire
- Died: July 16, 1729 (aged 46)
- Known for: Circle of fifths
- Children: 1

Johann David Heinichen (17 April 1683 – 16 July 1729) was a German Baroque composer and music theorist who brought the musical genius of Venice to the court of Augustus II the Strong in Dresden. After he died, Heinichen's music attracted little attention for many years. As a music theorist, he is credited as one of the inventors of the circle of fifths.

== Biography ==
Johann David Heinichen was born in 1683 in the small village of Krössuln (currently part of the town of Teuchern, in Saxony-Anhalt) near Weissenfels. His father, Michael Heinichen, had studied music at the celebrated Thomasschule Leipzig associated with the Thomaskirche, served as cantor in Pegau and was pastor of the village church in Krössuln. Johann David also attended the Thomasschule Leipzig. There he studied music with Johann Schelle and later received organ and harpsichord lessons with Johann Kuhnau. The future composer Christoph Graupner was also a student of Kuhnau at the time.

Heinichen enrolled in 1702 to study law at the University of Leipzig and in 1705–1706 qualified as a lawyer (in the early 18th century law was a favored field of study for composers; Kuhnau, Graupner and Georg Philipp Telemann were also lawyers). Heinichen practiced law in Weissenfels until 1709.

However, Heinichen maintained his interest in music and was concurrently composing operas. In 1710, he published the first edition of his major treatise on the thoroughbass. He went to Italy and spent seven formative years there, mostly in Venice, achieving great success with two operas, Mario and Le passioni per troppo amore (1713). Mario was staged again in Hamburg in 1716 with the German title, Calpurnia, oder die romische Grossmut.

In 1712, he taught music to Leopold, Prince of Anhalt-Köthen, who took him as composer. The same prince would appoint Johann Sebastian Bach Kapellmeister at the end of 1717. In 1716, Heinichen met in Venice Prince Frederick Augustus, son of King Augustus II the Strong, and thanks to him was appointed the Royal-Polish and Electoral-Saxon Kapellmeister in Dresden. His pupils included Johann Georg Pisendel. In 1721, Heinichen married in Weissenfels; the birth of his only child is recorded as January 1723. In his final years, Heinichen's health suffered greatly; on the afternoon of 16 July 1729, he was buried in the Johannes cemetery after succumbing to tuberculosis.

His music began to be better known after 1992 when Musica Antiqua Köln under Reinhard Goebel recorded a selection of the Dresden Concerti (Seibel 204, 208, 211, 213–215, 217, 226, 231–235, 240), followed by a recording of Heinichen's Lamentationes and Passionsmusik (1996). His sole opera for Dresden, Flavio Crispo (1720), was never performed and was only recorded in 2018. Two "passion oratorios", L'aride tempie ignude (1724?) and Come? S'imbruna il cieli Occhi piangete (1728) (classified in the catalogue as the cantatas Seibel 29 and 30), were recorded in 2021 by the Kölner Akademie.

== Circle of fifths ==
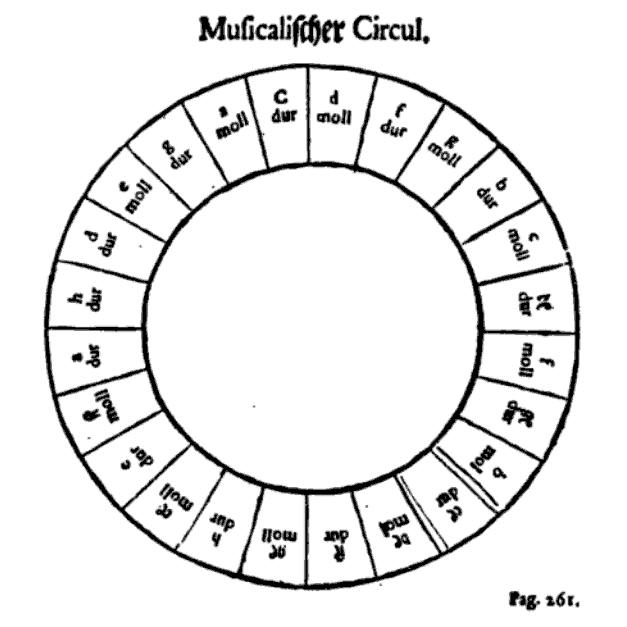
Heinichen's musical circle

Heinichen is credited with independently inventing the circle of fifths (German: Musicalischer Circul) in his Neu erfundene und gründliche Anweisung (1711), though he was not the earliest inventor. The circle of fifths had previously been invented by Nikolay Diletsky in the late 1670s (of which Heinichen was unaware). Heinichen credited Athanasius Kircher as a predecessor, specifically his Musurgia universalis (1650).
