= List of works for the stage by Lorenzo Ferrero =

This is a complete list of the stage works by Lorenzo Ferrero (born 1951).

== List ==
Title	Genre	Subdivisions	Libretto	Composition	Première date	Place, theatre
Le Néant où l'on ne peut arriver	oratorio		on a text by Blaise Pascal	1976	16 October 1976	Graz, Graz Cathedral
Invito a nozze	ballet			1978	28 June 1978	Teatro Comunale Florence
Rimbaud, ou Le Fils du soleil	quasi un melodramma	3 acts	Louis-François Caude	1978	24 July 1978	Festival d'Avignon
Marilyn	scenes from the '50s	2 acts	by the composer and Floriana Bossi	1979	23 February 1980	Teatro dell'Opera di Roma
La figlia del mago	giocodramma melodioso	2 acts	Marco Ravasini	1981	31 July 1981	Montepulciano, Teatro Poliziano
Mare nostro	comic opera	2 acts	Marco Ravasini	1985	11 September 1985	Alessandria, Teatro Comunale
Night	opera	1 act	by the composer, after Novalis	1985	8 November 1985	Munich, Bavarian State Opera
Lotus Eaters	ballet			1985	December 1985	New York City, Joyce Theatre
Salvatore Giuliano	opera	1 act	Giuseppe Di Leva	1985	25 January 1986	Teatro dell'Opera di Roma
Nebbia di latte	incidental music		composed for a performance of Gianni Colosimo's eponymous play	1987	6 January 1988	Turin, Cabaret Voltaire
La cena delle beffe	incidental music		composed for a performance of Sem Benelli's play of the same name	1988	6 December 1988	Perugia, Teatro Morlacchi
Charlotte Corday	opera	3 acts	Giuseppe Di Leva	1988	21 February 1989	Teatro dell'Opera di Roma
Le Bleu-blanc-rouge et le noir	marionette opera		J.P. Carasso, after Anthony Burgess	1989	15 November 1989	Paris, Centre Pompidou
Maschere	incidental music		composed for a performance of Carlo Goldoni's comedy Le massere	1993	6 February 1993	Teatro Stabile del Veneto
La nascita di Orfeo	musical action	1 act	by the composer, with fragments from Euripides and Simonides	1996	19 April 1996	Verona, Teatro Filarmonico
La Conquista	opera	2 acts	by the composer and Frances Karttunen	2002–2004	12 March 2005	Prague National Theatre
Lontano dagli occhi	theatre piece		Vincenzo De Vivo	2005	28 August 2005	Città di Castello
Mozart a Recanati	theatre piece		Vincenzo De Vivo	2006	9 September 2006	Jesi, Teatro Pergolesi
Franca Florio, regina di Palermo	ballet	2 acts	Luciano Cannito	2007	22 November 2007	Palermo, Teatro Massimo
Le piccole storie: Ai margini delle guerre	chamber opera	1 act	Giuseppe Di Leva	2007	9 December 2007	Teatro Comunale Modena
Risorgimento!	opera	1 act	Dario Oliveri	2010	26 March 2011	Teatro Comunale Modena
