= Italian opera =

Operas in Italy or in the Italian language

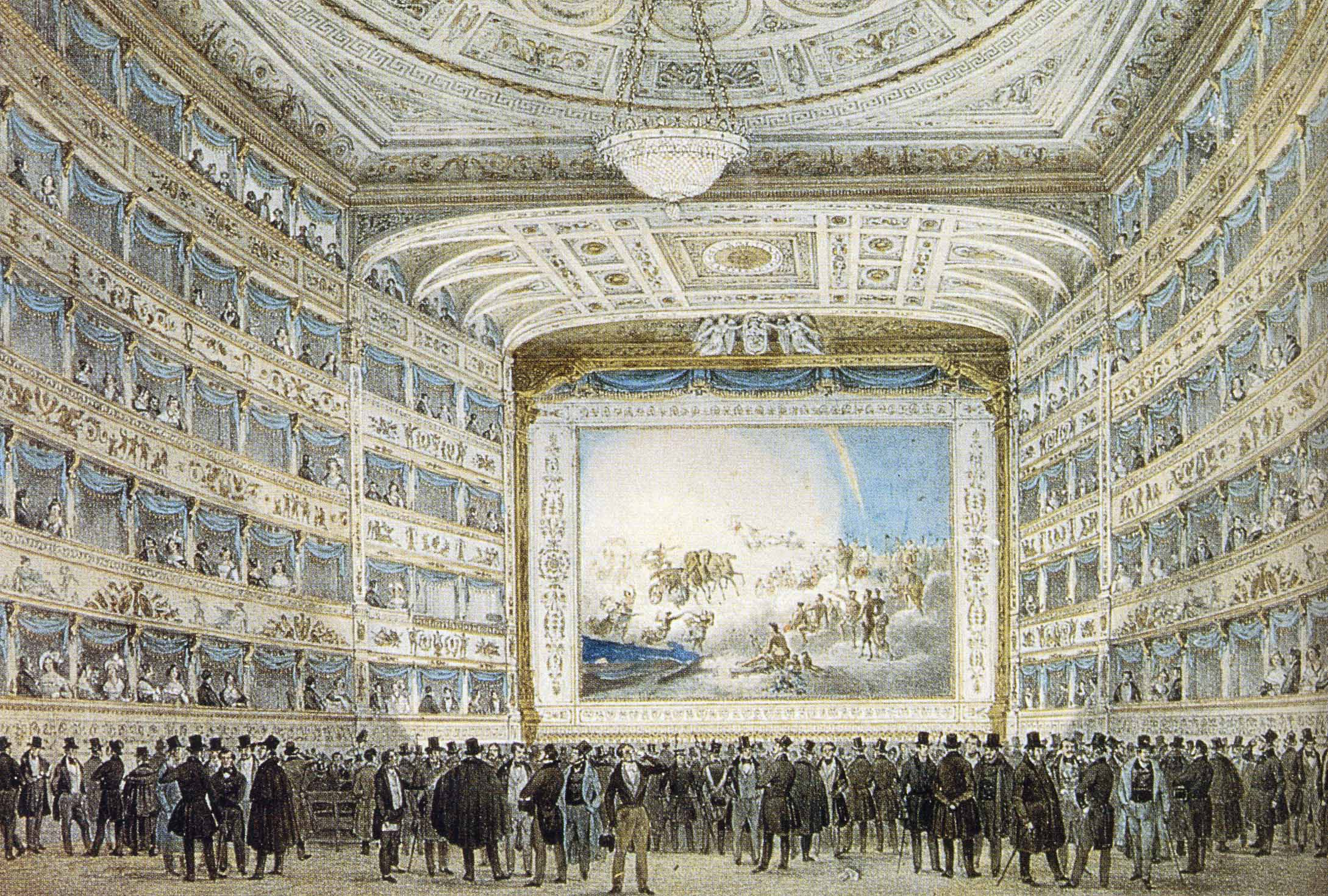
Interior of La Fenice opera house in Venice in 1837. Venice was, along with Florence and Rome, one of the cradles of Italian opera.

Italian opera is both the art of opera in Italy and opera in the Italian language. Opera was born in Italy around the year 1600 and Italian opera has continued to play a dominant role in the history of the form until the present day. Many famous operas in Italian were written by foreign composers, including Handel, Gluck and Mozart. Works by native Italian composers of the 19th and early 20th centuries, such as Rossini, Bellini, Donizetti, Verdi and Puccini, are amongst the most famous operas ever written and today are performed in opera houses across the world.

== Origins ==
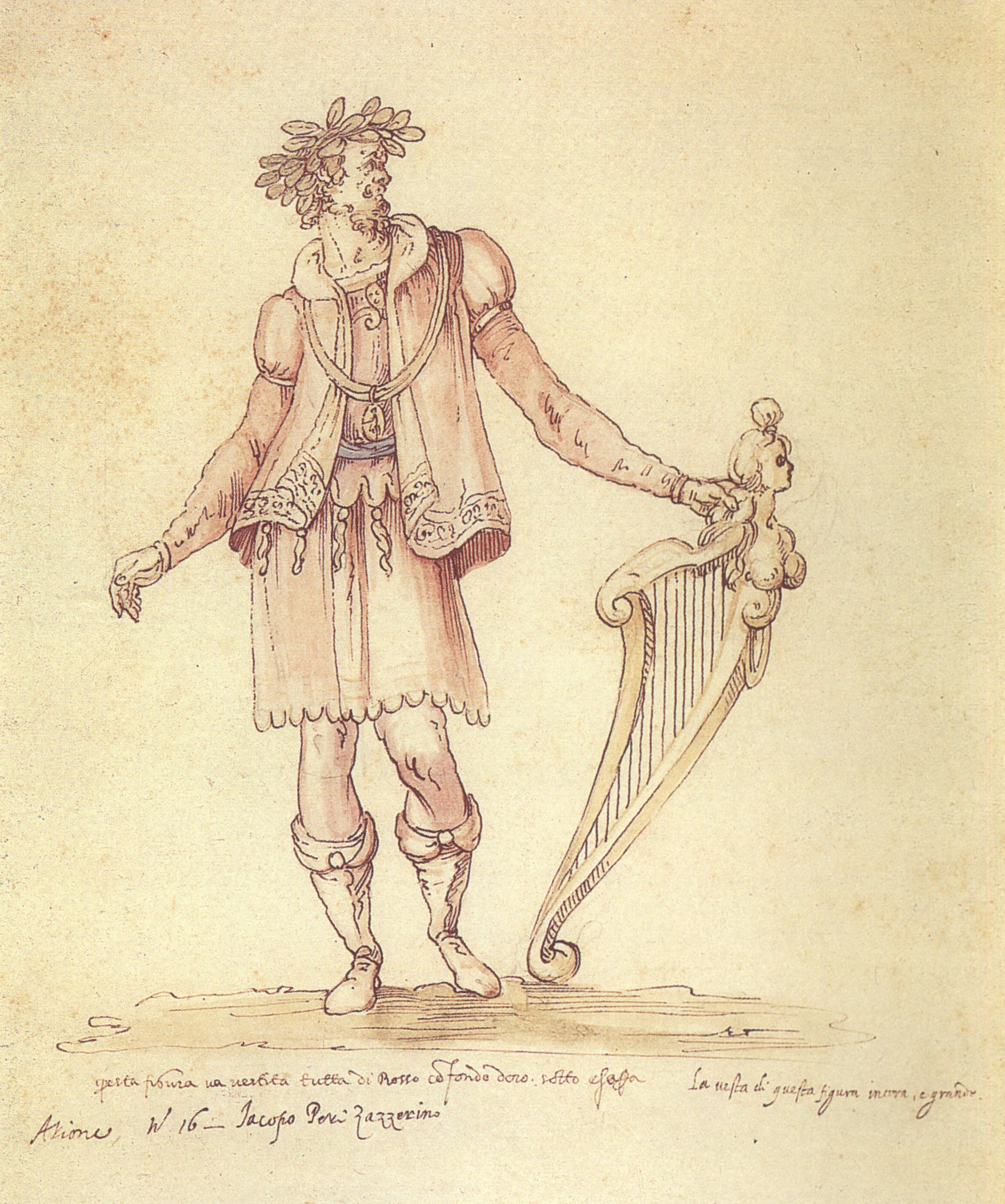
Jacopo Peri as Arion in La pellegrina

Dafne by Jacopo Peri was the earliest composition considered opera, as understood today. Peri's works, however, did not arise out of a creative vacuum in the area of sung drama. An underlying prerequisite for the creation of opera proper was the practice of monody. Monody is the solo singing/setting of a dramatically conceived melody, designed to express the emotional content of the text it carries, which is accompanied by a relatively simple sequence of chords rather than other polyphonic parts. Italian composers began composing in this style late in the 16th century, and it grew in part from the long-standing practice of performing polyphonic madrigals with one singer accompanied by an instrumental rendition of the other parts, as well as the rising popularity of more popular, more homophonic vocal genres such as the frottola and the villanella. In these latter two genres, the increasing tendency was toward a more homophonic texture, with the top part featuring an elaborate, active melody, and the lower ones (usually these were three-part compositions, as opposed to the four-or-more-part madrigal) a less active supporting structure. From this, it was only a small step to fully-fledged monody. All such works tended to set humanist poetry of a type that attempted to imitate Petrarch and his Trecento followers, another element of the period's tendency toward a desire for restoration of principles it associated with a mixed-up notion of antiquity.

The solo madrigal, frottola, villanella and their kin featured prominently in the intermedio or intermezzo, theatrical spectacles with music that were funded in the last seventy years of the 16th century by the opulent and increasingly secular courts of Italy's city-states. Such spectacles were usually staged to commemorate significant state events: weddings, military victories, and the like, and alternated in performance with the acts of plays. Like the later opera, an intermedio featured the aforementioned solo singing, but also madrigals performed in their typical multi-voice texture, and dancing accompanied by the present instrumentalists. They were lavishly staged, and led the scenography of the second half of the 16th century. The intermedi tended not to tell a story as such, although they occasionally did, but nearly always focused on some particular element of human emotion or experience, expressed through mythological allegory.

The staging in 1600 of Peri's opera Euridice as part of the celebrations for a Medici wedding, the occasions for the most spectacular and internationally famous intermedi of the previous century, was probably a crucial development for the new form, putting it in the mainstream of lavish courtly entertainment.

Another popular court entertainment at this time was the "madrigal comedy", later also called "madrigal opera" by musicologists familiar with the later genre. This consisted of a series of madrigals strung together to suggest a dramatic narrative, but not staged. There were also two staged musical "pastoral"s, Il Satiro and La Disperazione di Fileno, both produced in 1590 and written by Emilio de' Cavalieri. Although these lost works seem only to have included arias, with no recitative, they were apparently what Peri was referring to, in his preface to the published edition of his Euridice, when he wrote: "Signor Emilio del Cavalieri, before any other of whom I know, enabled us to hear our kind of music upon the stage". Other pastoral plays had long included some musical numbers; one of the earliest, Fabula di Orfeo (1480) by Poliziano had at least three solo songs and one chorus.

== 17th century ==
=== Florence and Mantua ===
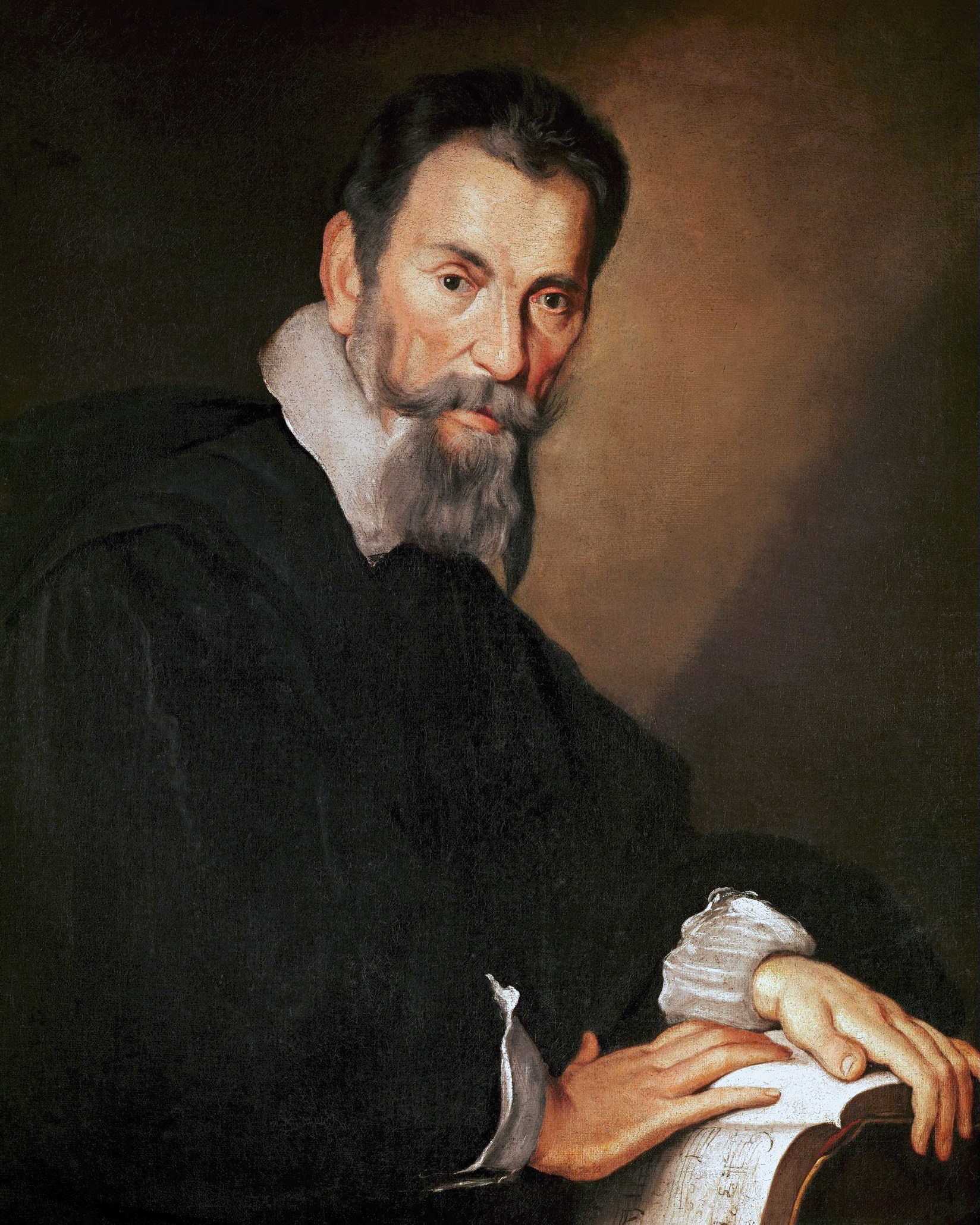
Claudio Monteverdi by Bernardo Strozzi, c. 1630

The music of Dafne is now lost, except for the 455 line verse libretto. The first opera for which music has survived was performed in 1600 at the wedding of Henry IV of France and Marie de Medici at the Pitti Palace in Florence. The opera, Euridice, with a libretto by Rinuccini, set to music by Peri and Giulio Caccini, recounted the story of Orpheus and Eurydice. The style of singing favored by Peri and Caccini was a heightened form of natural speech, dramatic recitative supported by instrumental string music. Recitative thus preceded the development of arias, though it soon became the custom to include separate songs and instrumental interludes during periods when voices were silent. Both Dafne and Euridice also included choruses commenting on the action at the end of each act in the manner of Greek tragedy. The theme of Orpheus, the demi-god of music, was understandably popular and attracted Claudio Monteverdi (1567–1643) who wrote his first opera, L'Orfeo (The Fable of Orpheus), in 1607 for the court of Mantua.

Monteverdi insisted on a strong relationship between the words and music. When Orfeo was performed in Mantua, an orchestra of 38 instruments, numerous choruses and recitatives were used to make a lively drama. It was a far more ambitious version than those previously performed – more opulent, more varied in recitatives, more exotic in scenery – with stronger musical climaxes which allowed the full scope for the virtuosity of the singers. Opera had revealed its first stage of maturity in the hands of Monteverdi. L'Orfeo also has the distinction of being the earliest surviving opera that is still regularly performed today.

=== Opera in Rome ===
Within a few decades opera had spread throughout Italy. In Rome, it found an advocate in the prelate and librettist Giulio Rospigliosi (later Pope Clement IX). Rospigliosi's patrons were the Barberini.

Among the composers who worked in this period were Luigi Rossi, Michelangelo Rossi, Marco Marazzoli, Domenico and Virgilio Mazzocchi, Stefano Landi.

Since the 1630s, the subject of the works changed greatly: those of the pastoral tradition and Arcadia, it is preferable that the poems of chivalry, usually Ludovico Ariosto and Torquato Tasso, or those taken from hagiography and Christian commedia dell'arte.

With the increased number of characters, the Roman operas became very dramatic, and had several twists. With these came along a new method of fixing the lines of the recitative, better suited to the various situations that arose from the rich storyline and that was closer to speech, full of parenthetical at the expense of the paratactic style that had so characterized the first Florentine works.

=== Venice: commercial opera ===
The principal characteristics of Venetian opera were (1) more emphasis on formal arias; (2) the beginning of bel canto ("beautiful singing") style, and more attention to vocal elegance than to dramatic expression; (3) less use of choral and orchestral music; (4) complex and improbable plots; (5) elaborate stage machinery; and (6) short fanfarelike instrumental introductions, the prototypes of the later overture.

Opera took an important new direction when it reached the republic of Venice. It was here that the first public opera house, the Teatro di San Cassiano, was opened in 1637 by Benedetto Ferrari and Francesco Manelli. Its success moved opera away from aristocratic patronage and into the commercial world. In Venice, musical drama was no longer aimed at an elite of aristocrats and intellectuals and acquired the character of entertainment. Soon many other opera houses had sprung up in the city, performing works for a paying public during the Carnival season. The opera houses employed a very small orchestra to save money. A large part of their budget was spent on attracting the star singers of the day; this was the beginning of the reign of the castrato and the prima donna (leading lady).

The chief composer of early Venetian opera was Monteverdi, who had moved to the republic from Mantua in 1613, with later important composers including Francesco Cavalli, Antonio Cesti and Giovanni Legrenzi. Monteverdi wrote three works for the public theatres: Il ritorno d'Ulisse in patria (1640), Le nozze d'Enea con Lavinia (1641, now lost) and, most famously, L'incoronazione di Poppea (1642). The subjects of the new operas by Monteverdi and others were generally drawn from Roman history or legends about Troy, in order to celebrate the heroic ideals and noble genealogy of the Venetian state. However they did not lack for love interest or comedy. Most of the operas consisted of three acts, unlike the earlier operas which normally had five. The bulk of the versification was still recitative, however at moments of great dramatic tension there were often arioso passages known as arie cavate. Under Monteverdi's followers, the distinction between the recitative and the aria became more marked and conventionalised. This is evident in the style of the four most successful composers of the next generation: Francesco Cavalli, Antonio Cesti, Giovanni Legrenzi and Alessandro Stradella.

=== Spread of opera abroad ===
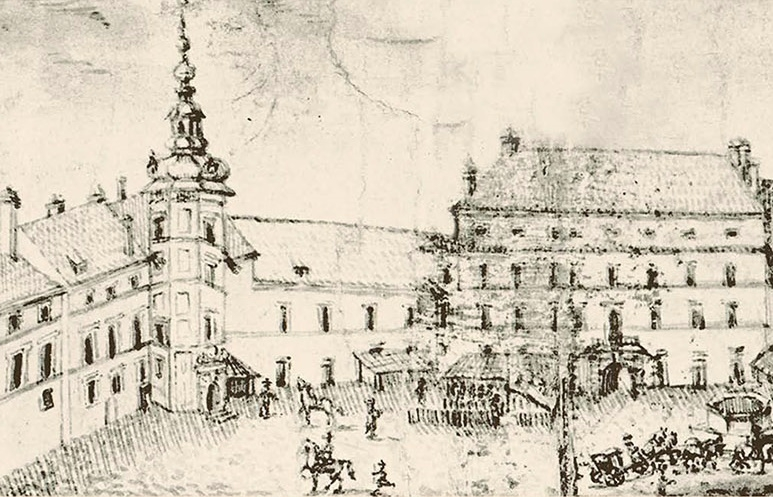
Władysław's Opera Hall Building (right) at the Royal Castle in Warsaw

In the Polish–Lithuanian Commonwealth a tradition of operatic production began in Warsaw in 1628, with a performance of Galatea (composer uncertain), the first Italian opera produced outside Italy. Shortly after this performance, the court produced Francesca Caccini's opera La liberazione di Ruggiero dall'isola d’Alcina, which she had written for Prince Władysław Vasa three years earlier when he was in Italy. Another first, this is the earliest surviving opera written by a woman. Gli amori di Aci e Galatea by Santi Orlandi was also performed in 1628. When Władysław was king (as Władysław IV) he oversaw the production of at least ten operas during the late 1630s and 1640s, making Warsaw a center of the art. The composers of these operas are not known: they may have been Poles working under Marco Scacchi in the royal chapel, or they may have been among the Italians imported by Władysław. A dramma per musica (as serious Italian opera was known at the time) entitled Giuditta, based on the Biblical story of Judith, was performed in 1635. The composer was probably Virgilio Puccitelli.

Cavalli's operas were performed throughout Italy by touring companies with tremendous success. In fact, his Giasone was the most popular opera of the 17th century, though some critics were appalled at its mixture of tragedy and farce. Cavalli's fame spread throughout Europe. One of his specialties was giving his heroines "ground bass laments". These were mournful arias sung over a descending bass line and they had a great influence on Henry Purcell, whose "When I am laid in earth" from Dido and Aeneas is probably the most celebrated example of the form. Cavalli's reputation caused Cardinal Mazarin to invite him to France in 1660 to compose an opera for King Louis XIV's wedding to Maria Teresa of Spain. Italian opera had already been performed in France in the 1640s to a mixed reception and Cavalli's foreign expedition ended in disaster. French audiences did not respond well to the revival of Xerse (1660) and the specially composed Ercole amante (1662), preferring the ballets that had been inserted between the acts by a Florentine composer, Jean-Baptiste Lully, and Cavalli swore never to compose another opera.

Cesti was more fortunate when he was asked to write an opera for the Habsburg court in Vienna in 1668. Il pomo d'oro was so grandiose that the performance had to be spread over two days. It was a tremendous success and marked the beginning of Italian operatic dominance north of the Alps. In the late 17th century, German and English composers tried to establish their own native traditions but by the early 18th century they had given ground to imported Italian opera, which became the international style in the hands of composers such as Handel. Only France resisted (and her operatic tradition had been founded by the Italian Lully). This set the pattern until well into the 19th century: the Italian tradition was the international one and its leading exponents (e.g. Handel, Hasse, Gluck and Mozart) were often not natives of Italy. Composers who wanted to develop their own national forms of opera generally had to fight against Italian opera. Thus, in the early 19th century, both Carl Maria von Weber in Germany and Hector Berlioz in France felt they had to challenge the enormous influence of the Italian Rossini.

== 18th century ==
=== Opera seria ===
By the end of the 17th century, some critics believed that a new, more elevated form of opera was necessary. Their ideas would give birth to a genre, opera seria (literally "serious opera"), which would become dominant in Italy and much of the rest of Europe until the late 18th century. The influence of this new attitude can be seen in the works of the composers Carlo Francesco Pollarolo and the enormously prolific Alessandro Scarlatti.

During the 18th century artistic and cultural life in Italy was heavily influenced by the aesthetic and poetic ideals of the members of the Accademia dell'Arcadia. The Arcadian poets introduced many changes to serious music drama in Italian, including:

- the simplification of the plot;
- the removal of comic elements;
- the reduction of the number of arias;
- a predilection for plots drawn from ancient Classical or modern French tragedy, in which the values of loyalty, friendship and virtue were extolled and the absolute power of the sovereign was celebrated.

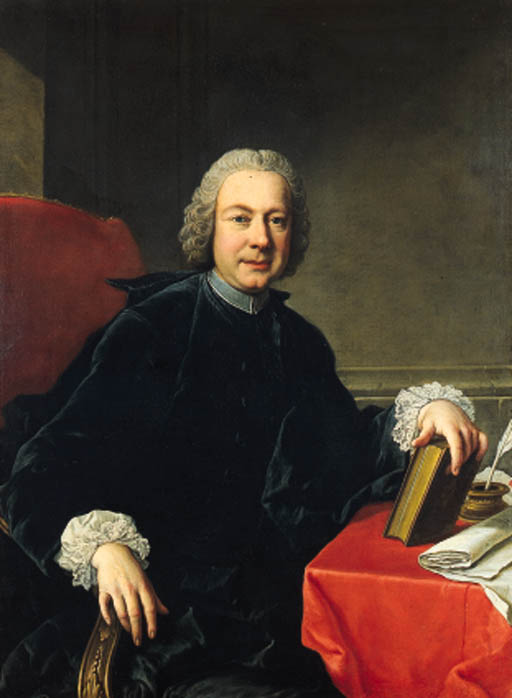
Pietro Metastasio, attributed to Pompeo Batoni

By far the most successful librettist of the era was Pietro Metastasio and he maintained his prestige well into the 19th century. He belonged to the Arcadian Academy and was firmly in line with its theories. A libretto by Metastasio was often set by twenty or thirty different composers and audiences came to know the words of his dramas by heart.

=== Opera buffa ===
In the 17th century comic operas were produced only occasionally and no stable tradition was established. Only in the early years of the 18th century was the comic genre of opera buffa born in Naples and it began to spread throughout Italy after 1730.

Opera buffa was distinguished from opera seria by numerous characteristics:

- the importance given to stage action and the consequent need for the music to follow the changes of the drama, emphasising the expressiveness of the words;
- the choice of singers who were also excellent actors able to perform the drama convincingly;
- a reduction in the use of scenery and stage machinery and in the number of orchestral players;
- the use of a small cast of characters (at least in the short form of comic opera known as the intermezzo) and simple plots (a good example being Pergolesi's La serva padrona, 1733);
- libretti inspired by commedia dell'arte, with realistic subjects, colloquial language and slang expressions;
- as far as singing was concerned: the complete rejection of vocal virtuosity; a tendency to an incorrect pronunciation of the words; the frequent presence of rhythmic and melodic tics; the use of onomatopoeia and interjections;
- the exclusion of castrati.

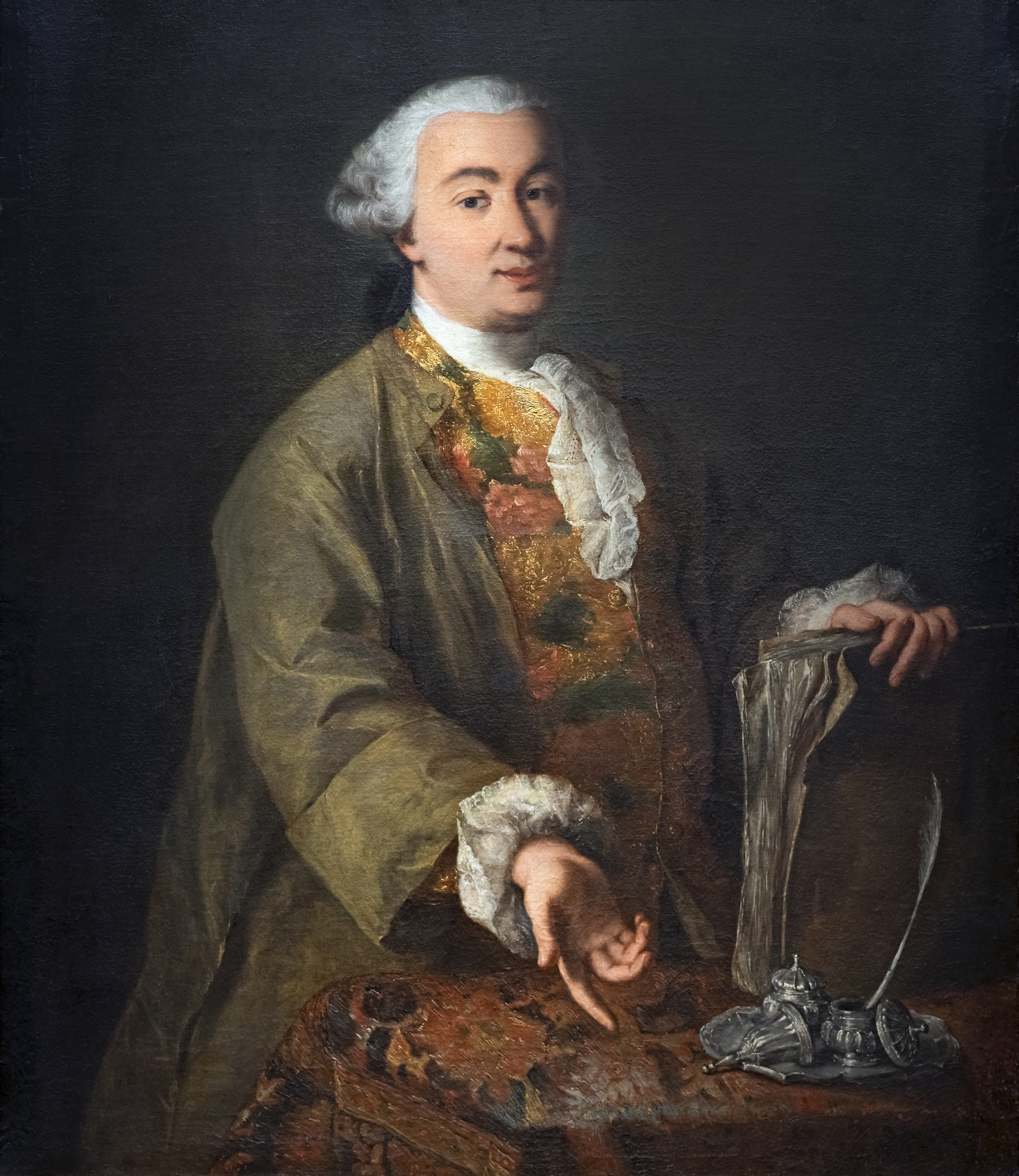
Carlo Goldoni by Alessandro Longhi, c. 1757

In the second half of the 18th century, comic opera owed its success to the collaboration between the playwright Carlo Goldoni and the composer Baldassare Galuppi. Thanks to Galuppi, comic opera acquired much more dignity than it had during the days of the intermezzo. Operas were now divided into two or three acts, creating libretti for works of a substantially greater length, which differed significantly from those of the early 18th century in the complexity of their plots and the psychology of their characters. These now included some serious figures instead of exaggerated caricatures and the operas had plots which focused on the conflict between the social classes as well as including self-referential ideas. Goldoni and Galuppi's most famous work together is Il filosofo di campagna (1754).

The collaboration between Goldoni and another famous composer Niccolò Piccinni produced with La Cecchina (1760) another new genre: opera semiseria. This had two buffo characters, two nobles and two "in between" characters.

The one-act farsa had a significant influence on the development of comic opera. This was a type of musical drama initially considered as a condensed version of a longer comic opera, but over time it became a genre in its own right. It was characterised by: vocal virtuosity; a more refined use of the orchestra; the great importance given to the production; the presence of misunderstandings and surprises in the course of the drama.

=== Gluck's reforms and Mozart ===
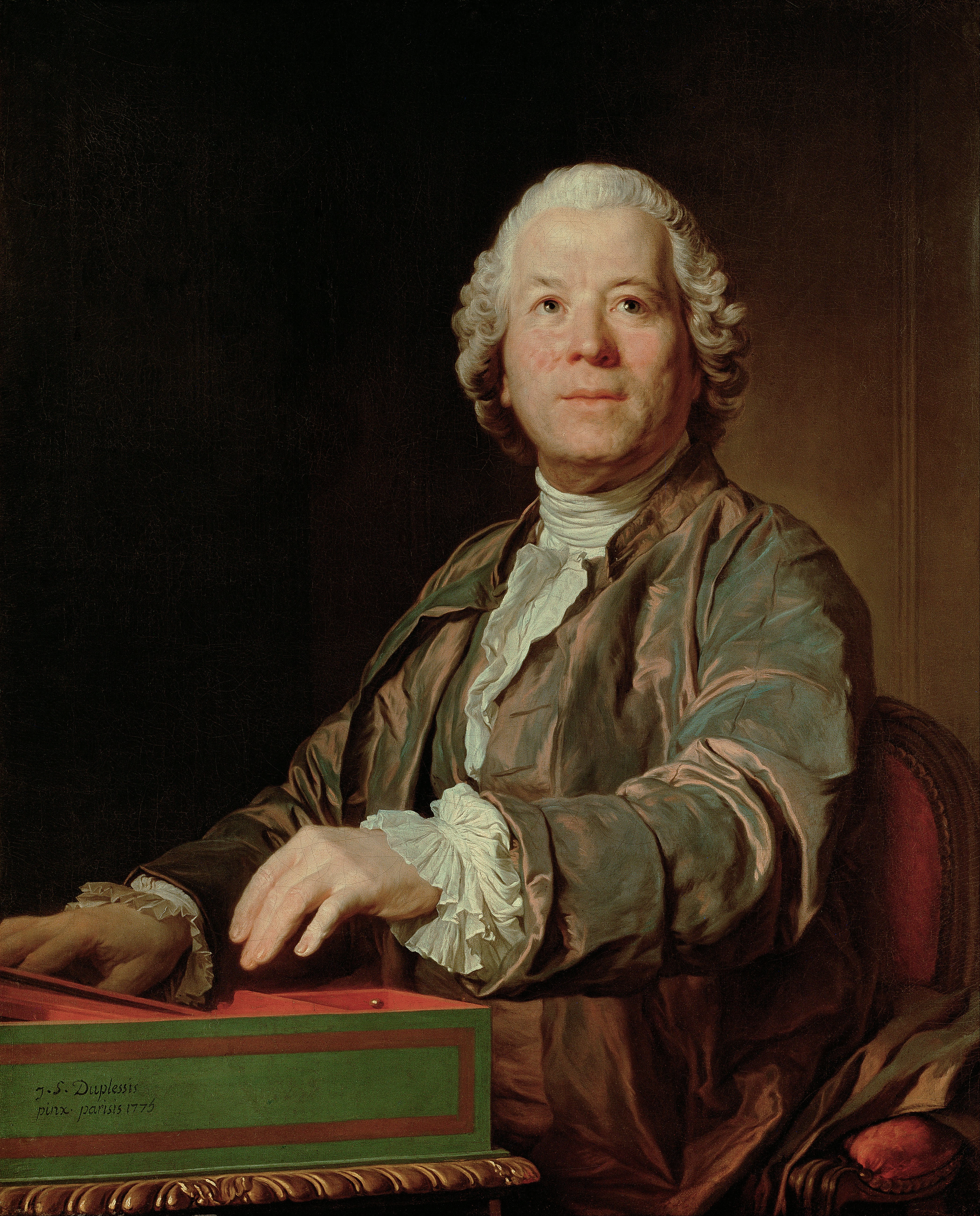
Christoph Willibald Gluck playing his clavichord (1775), by Joseph Duplessis

Opera seria had its weaknesses and critics; a taste for embellishment on behalf of the superbly trained singers, and the use of spectacle as a replacement for dramatic purity and unity drew attacks. Francesco Algarotti's Essay on the Opera (1755) proved to be an inspiration for Christoph Willibald Gluck's reforms. He advocated that opera seria had to return to basics and that all the various elements—music (both instrumental and vocal), ballet, and staging—must be subservient to the overriding drama. Several composers of the period, including Niccolò Jommelli and Tommaso Traetta, attempted to put these ideals into practice. In 1765 Melchior Grimm published "Poème lyrique", an influential article for the Encyclopédie on lyric and opera librettos.

The first to really succeed and to leave a permanent imprint upon the history of opera, however, was Gluck. Gluck tried to achieve a "beautiful simplicity". This is illustrated in the first of his "reform" operas, Orfeo ed Euridice, where vocal lines lacking in the virtuosity of (say) Handel's works are supported by simple harmonies and a notably richer-than-usual orchestral presence throughout.

Gluck's reforms have had resonance throughout operatic history. Weber, Mozart and Wagner, in particular, were influenced by his ideals. Mozart, in many ways Gluck's successor, combined a superb sense of drama, harmony, melody, and counterpoint to write a series of comedies, notably The Marriage of Figaro, Don Giovanni, and Così fan tutte (in collaboration with Lorenzo Da Ponte) which remain among the most-loved, popular and well-known operas today. But Mozart's contribution to opera seria was more mixed; by his time it was dying away, and in spite of such fine works as Idomeneo and La clemenza di Tito, he would not succeed in bringing the art form back to life again.

== Romantic period ==
Romantic opera, which placed emphasis on the imagination and the emotions began to appear in the early 19th century, and because of its arias and music, gave more dimension to the extreme emotions which typified the theater of that era. In addition, it is said that fine music often excused glaring faults in character drawing and plot lines. Gioachino Rossini (1792–1868) initiated the Romantic period. His first success was an "opera buffa" (comic opera), La cambiale di matrimonio (1810). His reputation still survives today through his Barber of Seville (1816), and La Cenerentola (1817). But he also wrote serious opera, Tancredi (1813) and Semiramide (1823).

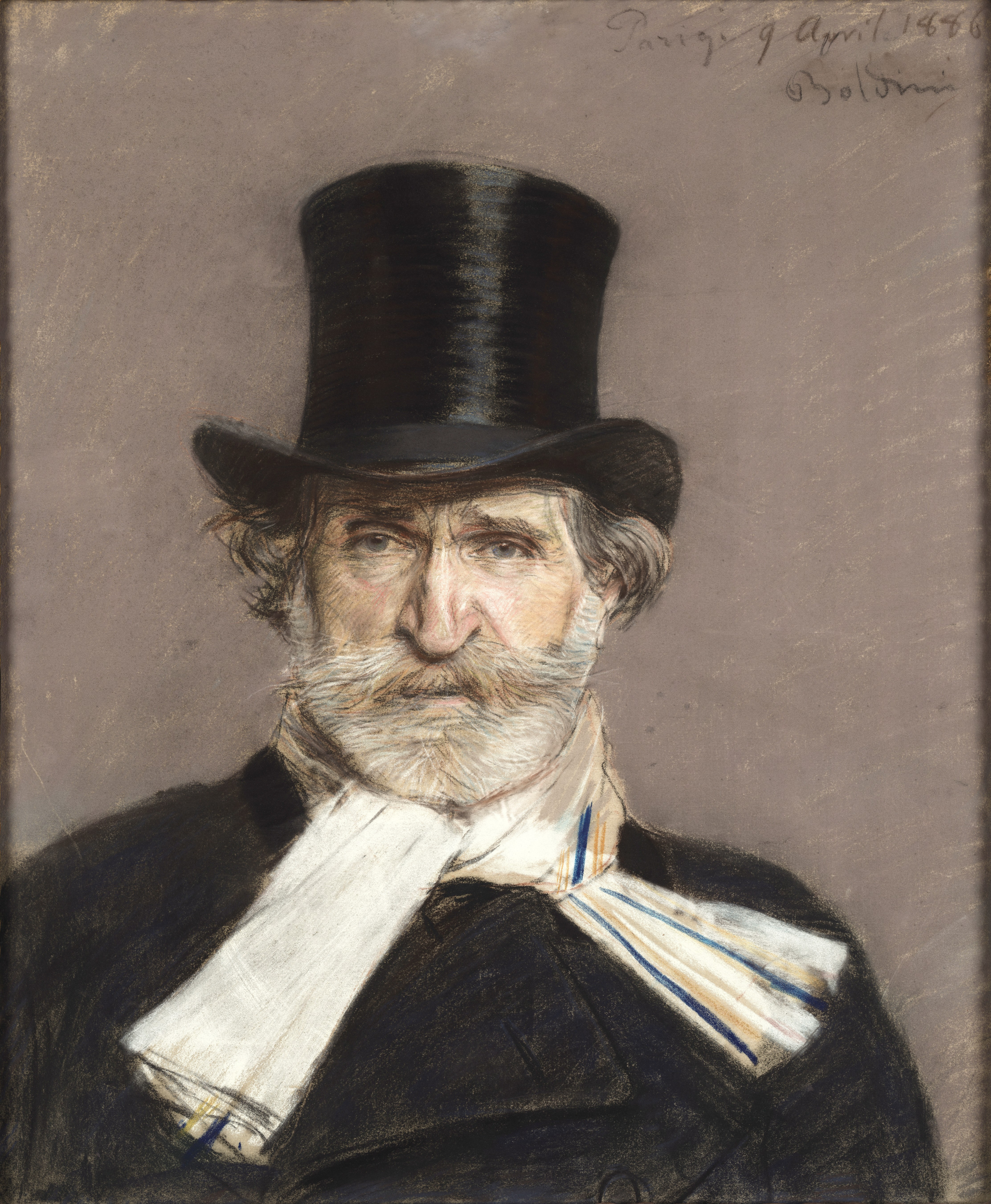
Giuseppe Verdi, by Giovanni Boldini (1886)

Rossini's successors in the Italian bel canto were Saverio Mercadante (1795–1870), Giovanni Pacini (1796–1867), Gaetano Donizetti (1797–1848), Vincenzo Bellini (1801–35) and Giuseppe Verdi (1813–1901). It was Verdi who transformed the whole nature of operatic writing during the course of his long career. His first great successful opera, Nabucco (1842), caught the public fancy because of the driving vigour of its music and its great choruses. "Va, pensiero", one of the chorus renditions, was interpreted and gave advantageous meaning to the struggle for Italian independence and to unify Italy.

After Nabucco, Verdi based his operas on patriotic themes and many of the standard romantic sources: Friedrich Schiller (Giovanna d'Arco, 1845; I masnadieri, 1847; Luisa Miller, 1849); Lord Byron (I due Foscari, 1844; Il corsaro, 1848); and Victor Hugo (Ernani, 1844; Rigoletto, 1851). Verdi was experimenting with musical and dramatic forms, attempting to discover things which only opera could do.

In 1887, he created Otello which completely replaced Rossini's opera of the same name, and which is described by critics as the finest of Italian romantic operas with the traditional components: the solo arias, the duets and the choruses fully integrated into the melodic and dramatic flow.

Verdi's last opera, Falstaff (1893), broke free of conventional form altogether and finds music which follows quick flowing simple words and because of its respect for the pattern of ordinary speech, it created a threshold for a new operatic era in which speech patterns are paramount.

Opera had become a marriage of the arts, a musical drama, full of glorious song, costume, orchestral music and pageantry; sometimes, without the aid of a plausible story. From its conception during the baroque period to the maturity of the romantic period, it was the medium through which tales and myths were revisited, history was retold and imagination was stimulated. The strength of it fell into a more violent era for opera: verismo, with Cavalleria rusticana by Pietro Mascagni and Pagliacci by Ruggero Leoncavallo.

== Contemporary period ==
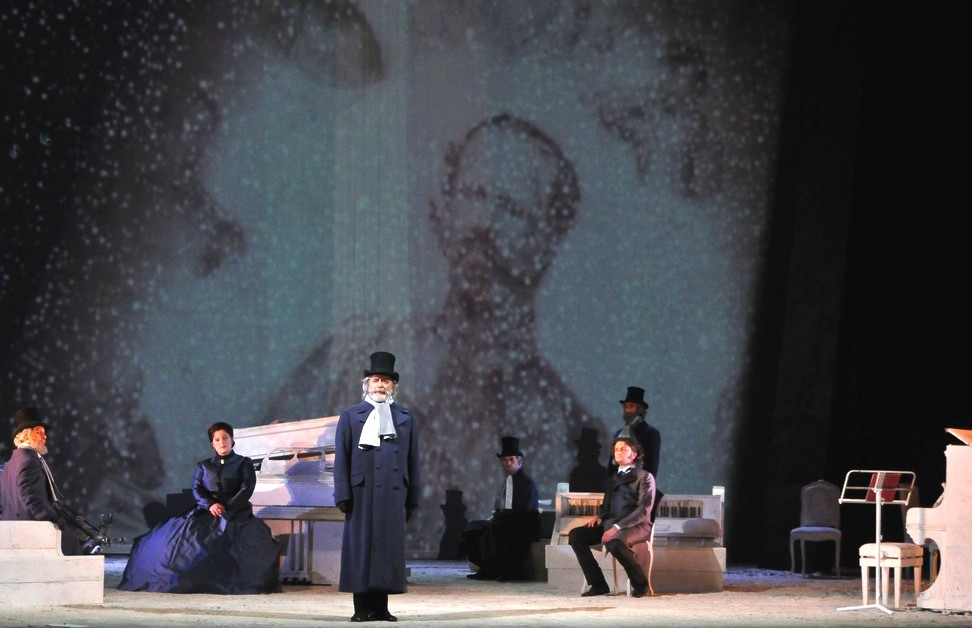
Final scene of the opera Risorgimento!

Some of the greatest Italian operas of the 20th century were written by Giacomo Puccini (1858–1924). These include Manon Lescaut, La bohème, Tosca, Madama Butterfly, La fanciulla del West, La rondine and Turandot, the last two being left unfinished. In 1926 and in 2002 Franco Alfano and Luciano Berio respectively attempted a completion of Turandot, and in 1994 Lorenzo Ferrero completed the orchestration of the third version of La rondine. Berio himself wrote two operas, Un re in ascolto and Opera. Ferrero likewise has composed several operas including Salvatore Giuliano, La Conquista, and his 2011 Risorgimento!

Other 20th-century Italian opera composers are:

- Gian Francesco Malipiero (1882–1973) whose 19 operas include L'Orfeide and Torneo notturno
- Luigi Dallapiccola (1904–1975) whose operas include Ulisse, Volo di notte and Il prigioniero
- Luigi Nono (1924–1990) who wrote Al gran sole carico d'amore, Intolleranza 1960, and Prometeo
- Sylvano Bussotti (1931–2021) whose prolific compositional output includes La Passion selon Sade, La Racine, pianobar pour Phèdre, Nympheo, Bozzetto siciliano
- Salvatore Sciarrino (born 1947) who wrote several operas including Luci mie traditrici

== See also ==
- List of Italian opera houses
- Italian-language operas (category)
