= Luciano Damiani =

Luciano Damiani (14 July 1923 – 20 June 2007) was an Italian stage and costume designer, who worked both for theatre and opera productions.

== Theatre and opera productions ==
Damiani studied painting and only by chance started working for the stage. Soon he became a close collaborator of Giorgio Strehler at Milan's Piccolo Teatro. International fame came with his famous stage designs for Goldoni's Le baruffe chiozzote (Piccolo Teatro, 1964, staged by Strehler) and for Mozart's Die Entführung aus dem Serail at the Salzburg Festival 1965 (staged by Strehler, conducted by Zubin Mehta). This production soon became legendary and was revived several times until 1975.

In 1966 Damiani created his first stage design for La Scala (Cavalleria rusticana, staged by Strehler, and conducted by Herbert von Karajan). This production was filmed and eventually televised on PBS's Great Performances.

His debut at the Vienna State Opera was a controversial Don Giovanni in 1967 (staged by Otto Schenk, conducted by Josef Krips, with Cesare Siepi as the Don). In accordance with Schenk Damiani emphasized the opera's comic and ironic elements and chose to use elements of Northern Italian rather than Spanish architecture which surprised many viewers, resulting in controversies between Damiani and Krips. When Damiani appeared before the curtain he was both applauded and booed by the audience.

In the late 1960s Damiani started working predominantly with other directors rather than Strehler and even started directing himself. In 1969 he directed as well as designed Aida for the Arena di Verona Festival (revived in 1970), though from time to time Damiani returned to the Piccolo Teatro and Strehler. He designed the sets for a noted 1974 production of Anton Chekhov's The Cherry Orchard. In 1974 both Strehler and Damiani returned to the Salzburg Festival for an ill-fated production of Die Zauberflöte conducted by Karajan.

Also in 1975 Damiani started his collaboration with Luca Ronconi with The Birds by Aristophanes for Vienna's Burgtheater. In 1978 at La Scala Damiani designed the sets for Ronconi's production of Verdi's Don Carlo, conducted by Claudio Abbado. Verdi's Macbeth was staged by Damiani and Ronconi for Berlin's Deutsche Oper in 1980 (conducted by Giuseppe Sinopoli).

In the early 1980s Damiani opened his own small theatre in Rome, the Teatro di documenti, where he directed and designed many plays. Only occasionally did he agree to work for other theatres and opera houses. In January 1986 he staged the premiere of the opera Salvatore Giuliano by Lorenzo Ferrero at the Teatro dell'Opera di Roma. Damiani returned to Vienna's Burgtheater in 1988 for Schiller's Wilhelm Tell staged by Claus Peymann. In 1996 he again worked for the Salzburg Festival designing La Traviata (conducted by Riccardo Muti and staged by Lluis Pasqual).

Damiani, though not well known to the general American public, is generally regarded as one of the leading stage designers of the 20th century.

== Production designer for film Man of La Mancha ==
Damiani designed the sets and costumes for the 1972 film, Man of La Mancha, based on the hit Broadway musical. Star Peter O'Toole, who portrayed both Miguel de Cervantes and his literary creation Don Quixote in the film, was only one of several who reportedly criticized Damiani's sets as being "too depressing"; however, the creators of the original stage production intended the physical look of it to be rather plain, as they specified in articles written for the original souvenir program of the show, so the drabness of the film's sets may have been quite intentional. Those who criticized them may have been expecting the standard "pretty" set designs usually found in movie musicals.

Howard Bay's single set for the original stage production, suggesting the interior of a dungeon, consisted of a plain four leaf clover-shaped stonelike slab tilted toward the audience, with a huge drawbridge-like staircase to allow prisoners to enter and exit. (The musical play was originally performed in a theatre in the round). There was also a grille overhead to allow light into the dungeon, and a trap door in the floor which opened to allow for a subterranean level. Every other scenic element was only imagined or vaguely suggested, as in an improvised play (audiences never actually saw the windmill that Don Quixote tilts at, and a single mattress with a cushion served as a bed).

The film, being more "realistic", featured more literal scenery. Don Quixote's fight with the windmill was actually shown, in an elaborately staged sequence, instead of taking place offstage as in the play. The two largest sets in the film consisted of the interior of the dungeon, and the courtyard of a shabby inn, respectively. Don Quixote's bedroom was also shown, as were the kitchen of the inn and the plains of what was supposed to be La Mancha (but was actually Italy). There was also a vastly more colorful town square featured in the opening scene - a scene not included in the original stage version, which showed a religious festival. Three different directors, Albert Marre, Peter Glenville, and Arthur Hiller were hired at separate times to make the film, with Marre and Glenville both being fired early in the project, and Hiller, who ended up also producing, responsible for the final result. However, according to associate producer Saul Chaplin, it was not Hiller who was responsible for the final physical look of the film, but the previous directors hired to work on it.

Man of La Mancha was Damiani's only film made for theatrical release.

A production of Verdi's Macbeth with Damiani's set designs is available on DVD, as is the film version of Man of La Mancha, and the 1968 Cavalleria Rusticana.
