= Diletta =

Diletta is an Italian female given name. Notable people with the name include:

- Diletta Leotta (born 1991), Italian television presenter and radio personality
- Diletta Rizzo Marin, Italian operatic mezzo-soprano
- Diletta Carli (born 1996), Italian swimmer
- Diletta Giampiccolo (born 1974), amateur Italian freestyle wrestler
- Rosa Diletta Rossi (born 1988), Italian actress
