= Jan Latham-Koenig =

British conductor

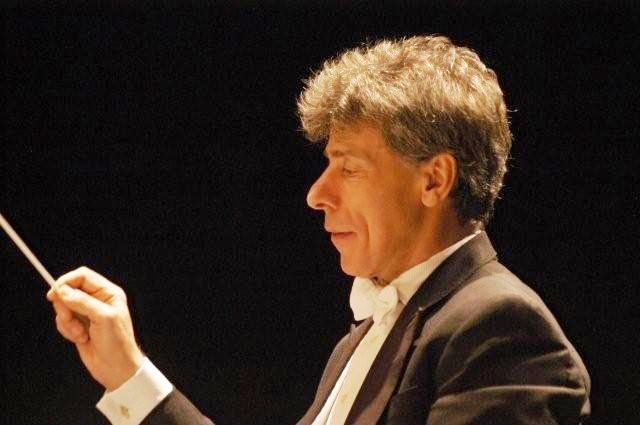
Jan Latham-Koenig

Jan Betrand Latham-Koenig (born December 1953) is a British conductor. He conducted all of the BBC ensembles, the London Philharmonic Orchestra and the Royal Philharmonic Orchestra. He was appointed an OBE for services to Russian-United Kingdom cultural relations and music in 2020. Latham-Koenig founded the Koenig Ensemble in 1976 and studied at the Royal College of Music.

Latham-Koenig was arrested and charged with three child sex offences in January 2024 and pleaded guilty to two of them, eventually receiving a suspended prison sentence in May 2024. In August 2025, Latham-Koenig was stripped of his OBE due to his conviction.

== Early life and education ==
Latham-Koenig was born in London in 1953 in a family of Mauritian, Danish and Polish origins. He attended Highgate School and then studied at the Royal College of Music in London.

== Career ==
Latham-Koenig founded the Koenig Ensemble in 1976 and began his career as a concert conductor with the BBC in 1981, winning the Gulbenkian Fellowship. He made his debut with the opera Macbeth at the Vienna State Opera in 1988 and was appointed its permanent guest conductor in 1991.

His guest appearances in opera and concert have included the Royal Opera House Covent Garden, English National Opera, New Japan Philharmonic, Tokyo Metropolitan Orchestra, Orchestre Philharmonique de Radio France, Orchestre National Bordeaux Aquitaine, Netherlands Radio Philharmonic, Orchestra dell'Arena di Verona, Los Angeles Philharmonic, Dresden Philharmonic, Rundfunk-Sinfonieorchester Berlin and the orchestras of Westdeutscher Rundfunk, Mitteldeutscher Rundfunk, Sudwestfunk and Baden-Baden in Germany. His appearances with the Accademia di Santa Cecilia in Rome have included the Beethoven Piano Concertos with Evgeny Kissin.

As an opera conductor, his appearances include La traviata (Royal Opera House London), Macbeth (Savonlinna Festival); Tristan und Isolde and Thaïs (Novaya Opera Moscow); Tristan und Isolde and Orfeo ed Euridice (National Opera Prague); Otello (New National Theatre Tokyo); Il viaggio a Reims (Finnish National Opera); I puritani (Vienna Staatsoper); Billy Budd (Gothenburg Opera); Venus and Adonis (Teatro Carlo Felice Genova); Tosca (Opéra National de Paris); La figlia del mago (Cantiere Internazionale d'Arte); Jenůfa and Hamlet (Royal Danish Opera); the Chilean première of Peter Grimes and I Lombardi (Orquesta Filarmónica del Teatro Municipal de Santiago). Additional performances have included Dialogues des Carmélites (BBC Proms, Teatro Colon, Buenos Aires, Opéra national du Rhin), the latter winning the Claude-Rostand Best Regional Production Prize 1999 and the Diapason d’or for best opera video 2001. He has also made some recordings.

Latham-Koenig was music director with ensembles and organisations including the Orchestra of Porto (which he founded at the request of the Portuguese government), the Cantiere Internazionale d’Arte di Montepulciano, Teatro Massimo di Palermo and both the Orchestre Philharmonique and the Opéra in Strasbourg. He has held Principal Guest Conductorships with Opéra national du Rhin, Teatro dell'Opera di Roma, Filarmonica del Teatro Regio di Torino and he was founder and artistic director of the Young Janáček Philharmonic.

Since August 2011, he has been artistic director of the Novaya Opera, Moscow, being the first British-born conductor to hold such a role in a Russian opera company. (Note: Albert Coates, who had a British father and was the principal conductor of the Russian Imperial Opera from 1910 to 1919, was born in St Petersburg.) He was appointed artistic director of the Orquesta Filarmónica de la UNAM, Mexico City in 2011. He was chief conductor of the Flanders Symphony Orchestra, Bruges, from 2013 until 2019, when he was succeeded by Kristiina Poska. In 2019 he founded the Britten Shostakovich Festival Orchestra, a collaborative venture composed of young British and Russian musicians. In 2022 he was announced as the music director of Teatro Colón in Buenos Aires, and in 2023 of the Festival Puccini at Torre del Lago.

Latham-Koenig was appointed Officer of the Order of the British Empire (OBE) in the 2020 Birthday Honours for services to music and UK/Russia cultural relations.

== Child sex offence arrest ==
Latham-Koenig was arrested on 10 January 2024 at Victoria station and charged with "arranging or facilitating an offence and sexual communication with a child" he had initially contacted on a gay dating app. He pleaded guilty to two of the three charges in February 2024, with a trial in March 2024 arranged for the remaining charge. He was subsequently fired from his position at Teatro Colón. On 28 May 2024 he was given a suspended prison sentence.

== Personal life ==
Latham-Koenig was married to Marjan Jahangiri, a professor of cardiac surgery. The marriage was legally ended in The Family Court in October 2024.
