= Mare nostro (opera) =

Opera by Lorenzo Ferrero

- Comic opera by Lorenzo Ferrero
- Librettist: Marco Ravasini
- Language: Italian
- Based on: Vittorio Alfieri's L'antidoto
- Premiere: 11 September 1985; Teatro Comunale, Alessandria

Mare nostro (Our Sea) is a comic opera in two acts composed by Lorenzo Ferrero to an Italian-language libretto by Marco Ravasini, loosely based on Vittorio Alfieri's 1804 comedy L'antidoto (o Tre veleni rimesta, avrai l'antidoto). The work was completed in 1985 and first performed at the Teatro Comunale, Alessandria on 11 September 1985.

The story, set on a small Mediterranean island, concerns "a Middle European philosopher, alert to the implications of a postmodern world, who deserts negative dialectics for money-making."

== Performance history ==
The original production directed by Giorgio Barberio Corsetti and conducted by Edoardo Müller was subsequently performed at the Benevento Città Spettacolo festival in Benevento on 14 September and at Settembre Musica in Turin on 19 September 1985. A new production of the opera conducted by Gianfranco Masini was performed on 18 October 1991 at the Teatro Sociale, Rovigo and on 26 October at the Teatro Comunale, Treviso. This production has been recorded on a double audio CD by the Italian record label Ricordi.

== Roles ==
| Role | Voice type | Premiere cast, 11 September 1985 (Conductor: Edoardo Müller) |
|---|---|---|
| Vinerblut, a foreign philosopher | basso profondo | Roberto Scandiuzzi |
| Pigliatutto, a rich local landowner | baritone | Bojan Šober |
| Astradiva, astrologer and wife of | mezzo-soprano | Maria Trabucco |
| Marchingello, a dreamy, idealistic inventor | bass-baritone | Alfonso Antoniozzi |
| Candeggina, a local girl, engaged to | soprano | Ilaria Galgani |
| Rimestino, a fisherman with little luck | tenor | Giuseppe Costanzo |
| Piglianchella, wife of Pigliatutto | offstage soprano voice | |
Mr. Ivenmor, a sailor, chorus.

== Synopsis ==
Place: A small Mediterranean island
Time: Unspecified

Act 1

Vinerblut, a temporarily unemployed Middle-European philosopher specialising in "cultural criticism," arrives on an unnamed Mediterranean island, having heard about a miraculous fishing machine. By listening to a conversation among the natives he finds out that the ingenious invention has become the property of Pigliatutto, the owner of the island. He introduces himself with some presents to Pigliatutto, who mistakes him for someone else he is expecting. Vinerblut pretends to be an itinerant clairvoyant luminary and predicts a terrible fate for the island and its inhabitants, promising at the same time to deliver an antidote.

Act 2

Pigliatutto's servants want to run away and Candeggina dreams of escaping with Vinerblut. Astradiva, Rimestino and Marchingello decide to seize the machine at all costs but Vinerblut manages to steal it first, after which he prepares to leave the island with Candeggina. On the beach at dawn, the trunk in which the stolen machine is hidden bursts open and everybody starts fighting over it until the apparatus falls to pieces. Pigliatutto appears and announces that Mr. Ivenmor, the foreign investor he was expecting, has arrived with plans to turn the island into a tourist village. He would like to punish the quartet of natives and the false prophet for their treachery and theft but Ivenmor suggests that they should become tourist animators in the new resort.

== Notable arias and excerpts ==
The orchestral Intermezzo ("Intermezzo notturno") was arranged for small orchestra as an excerpt for concert performance and premiered in Milan in December 1986.

== Recordings ==
| Year | Cast | Conductor, Opera House and Orchestra | Label |
|---|---|---|---|
| 1991 | Danilo Rigosa, Amelia Felle, Eleonora Jankovic, Claudio Di Segni, Alfonso Antoniozzi, Danilo Serraiocco, Sonia Visentin | Gianfranco Masini, Teatro Sociale di Rovigo, Orchestra and Chorus of the Conservatory of Music Francesco Venezze, Rovigo | Double CD: Ricordi; Cat: RFCD 2016 |
