= Sentieri selvaggi =

Italian musical group

Sentieri selvaggi is an Italian musical ensemble, specialising in contemporary music. Its name means "Wild Trails" in English.

It was founded in 1997 by Carlo Boccadoro, Filippo Del Corno and Angelo Miotto. The ensemble has worked with composers such as Ludovico Einaudi, Michael Nyman, Philip Glass, Fabio Vacchi, David Lang, James MacMillan, Lorenzo Ferrero, Ivan Fedele and Louis Andriessen.

Sentieri selvaggi has been a regular guest at Italian musical festivals including Teatro Alla Scala, Venice Biennale and MITO Music September, as well as at Italian cultural events including the Literary Festival at Mantua, the Science Festival at Genoa, and at international festivals including the Bang On A Can Marathon in New York City and the SKIF Festival in Saint Petersburg.

The group also organized a festival in Milan which, since 2005, has become a contemporary music season with a program of concerts, public talks, and master classes. Every program focuses on a specific theme: in 2010 the title of the season was Nuovo Mondo (New World).

The ensemble has also staged chamber operas, including Io Hitler by Filippo Del Corno, The Man Who Mistook His Wife for a Hat by Michael Nyman and The Sound of a Voice by Philip Glass.

== Publications and recordings ==
=== Albums ===
- La formula del fiore
- Bad blood
- Child
- Acts of beauty
- Hotel occidental
- Musica Cœlestis (books/cd)
- Zingiber

In 2006, the ensemble recorded the anthology AC/DC for the American label Cantaloupe Music. In 2008 the recording of Il cantante al microfono with soloist Eugenio Finardi won the 2008 Targa Tenco award.

=== Repertoire ===
- John Adams: Gnarly Buttons, Hallelujah Junction
- Louis Andriessen: Passeggiata in tram in America e ritorno (new version), Hout, Zilver, De Staat
- Christina Athinodorou: Aktaí (2008)
- Luciano Berio: O King
- Carlo Boccadoro: Bad blood, Bibì&Bibò, Keep Cool, Zingiber
- Gavin Bryars: Non la conobbe il mondo mentre l’ebbe, Jesus' Blood Never Failed Me Yet
- Michael Daugherty: Diamond in the rough, Sinatra shag
- Filippo Del Corno: Dogma#6, Hotel Occidental, L’uomo armato, Mancanza di soldi
- Ivan Fedele: Maja, Immagini da Escher
- Lorenzo Ferrero: Glamorama Spies, Tourists and Oracles
- Carlo Galante: La formula del fiore, Urban Ring
- Philip Glass; Facades, The Sound of a Voice, Wichita Vortex Sutra
- Michael Gordon: AC/DC, Industry
- Giya Kancheli: Exil, Nach dem Weinen
- David Lang: Developer, I fought the law, Stick figure, Sweet air
- James MacMillan: Raising sparks, Parthenogenesis, The Prophecy
- Michael Nyman: Acts of beauty, Something Connected With Energy, The Man Who Mistook His Wife For A Hat
- Arvo Pärt: Miserere, Stabat Mater
- Steve Reich: Cello Counterpoint, Daniel Variations, Proverb
- Fabio Vacchi: Dai calanchi di Sabbiuno, Mi chiamo Roberta
