= Glamorama Spies =

1999 composition by Lorenzo Ferrero

- by Lorenzo Ferrero
- Genre: Chamber music
- Publisher: Casa Ricordi
- Recorded: 2002 Sentieri Selvaggi (CD recording. Sensible Records) 2006 Sentieri Selvaggi (CD recording. Cantaloupe Music)
- Duration: 6 mins.

Premiere
- Date: 2000
- Location: Teatro Manzoni, Milan
- Conductor: Carlo Boccadoro
- Performers: Sentieri Selvaggi

Glamorama Spies for flute, clarinet, violin, violoncello and piano is a chamber-music work by Italian composer Lorenzo Ferrero, written in 1999.

== Overview ==
The composition was commissioned by Sentieri Selvaggi and first performed by them at the Teatro Manzoni in the year 2000. The American premiere took place in Houston on 17 February 2014.

Glamorama Spies was inspired by Bret Easton Ellis' 1998 satire novel Glamorama.

In Galamorama by Bret Easton Ellis, the main character is constantly spied on and, even before his consciousness becomes aware of it, he is constantly in an anxious state. Anxiolytics and some romantic intervals are not enough to stop the sensation that he is always late for something and that he is progressively losing his sense of reality. I was reading this book when Sentieri Selvaggi asked me for this piece and going from reading to writing seemed almost inevitable. Therefore, if at times you feel some hints at emotion, think about the second to the last sentence of the book: "The stars are real."

— Lorenzo Ferrero

== Analysis ==
The piece consists of a single movement lasting around six minutes, written in a chromatic and dissonant idiom. The opening section begins with a semitonal "anxiety" theme and ostinato figures atop an ostinato bass line, marked by off-beat bass accents. A lyrical section follows in which these elements gradually move to the background while a gentle, contrapuntal "sentimental" theme emerges in the cello. The exchange between the two contrasting main themes is interrupted from time to time by dramatic chords on the piano, representing the point of view of the protagonist. The final section recapitulates some of the thematic material of the first section. At the end, the tension subsides, leaving room for ethereal harmonies and a conclusive ending.

== Discography ==
In chronological order of recording:

- 2002. Bad Blood. Sentieri Selvaggi. CD recording. Sensible Records.
- 2006. AC/DC. Sentieri Selvaggi. CD recording. Cantaloupe Music.
