= Luca Ronconi =

Italian actor, theater director, and opera director

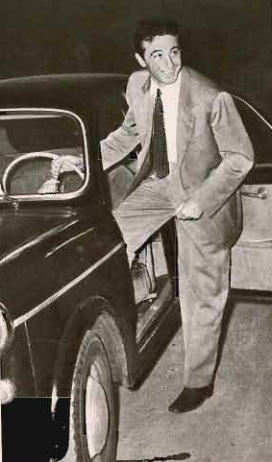
Luca Ronconi, 1959

Luca Ronconi (8 March 1933 – 21 February 2015) was an Italian actor, theatre director, and opera director.

== Biography ==
Ronconi was born in Sousse, Tunisia. After growing up in Tunisia, where his mother was a school teacher, Ronconi graduated from the Academy of Dramatic Art in Rome in 1953. He acted in productions of Luigi Squarzina, Orazio Costa, Michelangelo Antonioni, and others. In 1963, he directed his first play, La buona moglie, and from then on worked almost exclusively as a director. His first great success was with Orlando furioso that also toured in the US in 1970.

Ronconi is considered to have been one of Europe's most influential theatrical directors. He worked for renowned companies, such as the Burgtheater in Vienna (The Bacchae by Euripides, 1973; The Birds by Aristophanes, 1975; The Oresteia by Aeschylus, 1976), the Vienna State Opera (Il viaggio a Reims by Rossini, 1988), the Rossini Festival in Pesaro and the Salzburg Festival (Die Riesen vom Berge [I giganti della montagna] by Luigi Pirandello, 1994; Don Giovanni by Mozart, 1999).

His work was often seen at the Teatro alla Scala, from 1974: Die Walküre, Siegfried, Wozzeck (conducted by Claudio Abbado), Don Carlos, Donnerstag aus Licht, Les Troyens (with Dunja Vejzovic as Didon), Ernani (with Plácido Domingo, conducted by Riccardo Muti), Samstag aus Licht, L'Orfeo (of Luigi Rossi), Il viaggio a Reims, Aïda (with Maria Chiara), Fetonte, The Tale of Tsar Saltan, Guillaume Tell, Oberon, Lodoïska, Elektra (with Alan Titus as Orest), La damnation de Faust (with Jerry Hadley), Tosca, Ariadne auf Naxos, Moïse et pharaon, Europa riconosciuta, Il trittico, and The Makropulos Affair.

Ronconi managed the Teatro Stabile di Torino from 1989 to 1994, where he directed an imposing edition of Karl Kraus' The Last Days of Mankind, with more than sixty actors, staged in the Lingotto (1991). The play was performed soon after the First Gulf War and its anti-militaristic content was evidently tied to that conflict.

Ronconi collaborated with important stage designers, among them Pier Luigi Pizzi (The Bacchae, Die Walküre, Siegfried), Luciano Damiani (The Birds, The Oresteia, Don Carlos), and Ezio Frigerio (Les Troyens). He also inspired the architect Gae Aulenti to design certain of his productions (Il viaggio a Reims). Fashion designer Karl Lagerfeld also created the costumes for some of Ronconi's stagings (Les Troyens).

His operatic productions also included Carmen (with Mignon Dunn and Franco Corelli, 1970), Das Rheingold (1979), Nabucco (1977), Il trovatore (1977), Norma (with Renata Scotto, 1978), Macbeth (1980), La traviata (1982), L'Orfeo (1985 and 1998), Don Giovanni (1990 and 1999), The Turn of the Screw (1995), Il ritorno d'Ulisse in patria (1998), Lohengrin (1999), L'incoronazione di Poppea (2000), and Intolleranza (2011).

In 1998, he was the recipient of the Europe Theatre Prize.

Maestro Ronconi died in Milan on 21 February 2015, at the age of 81.

== Partial videography ==
- Verdi: Ernani (Freni, Domingo, Bruson; Muti, 1982) [live]
- Verdi: Aïda (Chiara, Dimitrova, Pavarotti; Maazel, 1985) [live]
- Verdi: Macbeth (Zampieri, Bruson, Morris; Sinopoli, 1987) [live]
- Rossini: Guillaume Tell (Studer, Merritt, Zancanaro; Muti, 1988) [live]
- Puccini: Tosca (Guleghina, Licitra, Nucci; Muti, 2000) [live]
- Rossini: Moïse et pharaon (Frittoli, Ganassi, Filianoti, Schrott, Abdrazakov; Muti, 2003) [live]
- Salieri: Europa riconosciuta (Damrau; Muti, 2004) [live]
- Puccini: Il trittico (Frittoli, Marrocu, Machaidze, Lipovšek, M.Dvorsky, Nucci; R.Chailly, 2008) [live]
