= Charlotte Corday (opera) =

Opera by Lorenzo Ferrero

- Opera by Lorenzo Ferrero
- Librettist: Giuseppe Di Leva
- Language: Italian
- Premiere: 21 February 1989; Teatro dell'Opera di Roma

Charlotte Corday is an opera in three acts by Lorenzo Ferrero to an Italian-language libretto by Giuseppe Di Leva, written on commission from the Teatro dell'Opera di Roma for the 200th anniversary of the French Revolution which was commemorated in 1989.

The fundamental theme of the opera is the individual terrorist action committed by anyone who believes that he or she is eliminating an evil by eliminating a person, in most cases the wrong person. The work describes three encounters of the Girondin sympathizer Charlotte Corday with Jean-Paul Marat, leading figure of the radical Jacobin faction, two attempts and finally the assassination itself.

== Performance history ==
The premiere directed by Mario Martone and conducted by Roberto Abbado took place at the Teatro dell'Opera di Roma on 21 February 1989. The opera had two subsequent new productions in Germany, one conducted by Istvan Dènes which was performed at the Theater Bremen on 28 April 1990, and the second conducted by Jan Michael Horstmann which ran for ten performances between 27 April and 7 June 2013 at the Mittelsächsisches Theater.

== Roles ==
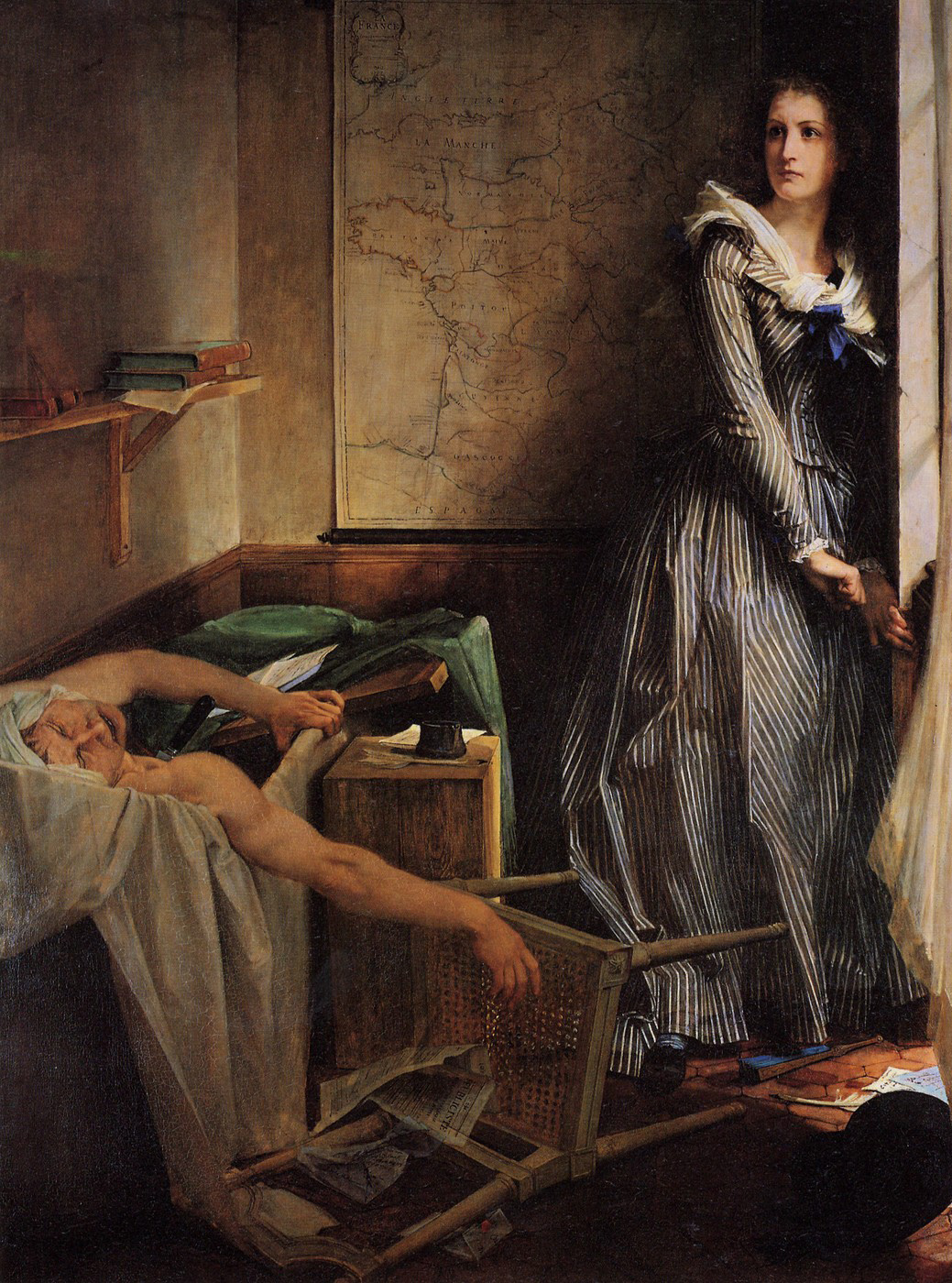
Charlotte Corday (1860), by Paul-Jacques-Aimé Baudry

Role	Voice type	Premiere cast, 21 February 1989 (Conductor: Roberto Abbado)
Charlotte Corday	dramatic soprano	Elena Mauti Nunziata
Jean-Paul Marat	bass	Roberto Scandiuzzi
Gaston, Marat's bodyguard	baritone	Antonio Salvadori
Camille, Girondist deputy	tenor	Claudio Di Segni
A street vendor	mezzo-soprano	Corinna Vozza
A drunken man	bass-baritone	Angelo Nardinocchi
Catherine Evrard, Marat's housekeeper	soprano	Laura Musella
People, traders, guards, workers, demobilized soldiers, children.

== Synopsis ==
Place: Paris
Time: 13 July 1793

Act 1

Charlotte Corday arrives in Paris at dawn. In a square she meets Camille, her childhood friend, now a deputy to the National Convention. He is disappointed, defeated, and fears for his life. Amongst the crowd is Gaston, who tells Charlotte that he is the bodyguard and faithful friend of Marat. Their conversation is interrupted by a commotion which arises around a bakery. In play, a group of children act out the events of the Revolution. The square slowly empties out, except for a child who is left behind by his playmates, tied up as a victim. Charlotte releases and comforts him, thereby building up courage herself, then she buys a long-bladed knife and a shawl from a pedlar. Marat arrives surrounded by an adulating crowd which, at the same time, notices his fatigue and ill-health. Charlotte attracts his attention for a moment, then he continues on to the hall of the Convention. She does not know how to take advantage of the situation to kill him. Marat, received by the deputies with a mixture of hostility and respect, addresses the assembly.

Act 2

On the Champ de Mars parade ground the decorations for the Bastille Day celebration are destroyed by a storm. An aggressive, raving drunk wanders around. Charlotte meets Camille again and finds him more dispirited than ever. He admits to her his total, profound political disillusionment; she, on the contrary, believes that a heroic deed is more necessary than ever. They are pestered by the drunk who accuses Camille of being a traitor, whereupon a patrol appears and arrests him. Charlotte delivers an attack against the Revolution's abuses of power. Gaston arrives and justifies the arrest but Marat frees Camille, after Charlotte vouches for him. Gaston is amazed as much as Marat himself by this unexpected clemency, while Charlotte asks herself why did she miss this new opportunity to murder Marat. He feels ill again and wants to be taken home.

Act 3

Marat is in the bathtub to which his debilitating skin condition confines him. He who wanted to cure the world is beaten by his own illness. Charlotte knocks at the door. Marat's housekeeper asks her to come back another time but he demands that she be let in. They remain alone together. Charlotte has brought a list of "enemies of the Revolution" for him to examine. He reads his own name at the top and asks for an explanation. They start an argument about power, loneliness, truth, and death, which ends up with her stabbing him to death. At the instant in which the blade descends upon him Marat understands the meaning of the look in Charlotte's eyes and dies without knowing her name.

== Notable arias and excerpts ==
The orchestral Intermezzo was arranged as excerpt for concert performance.
