= Festival Internacional de Santander =

Spanish music festival

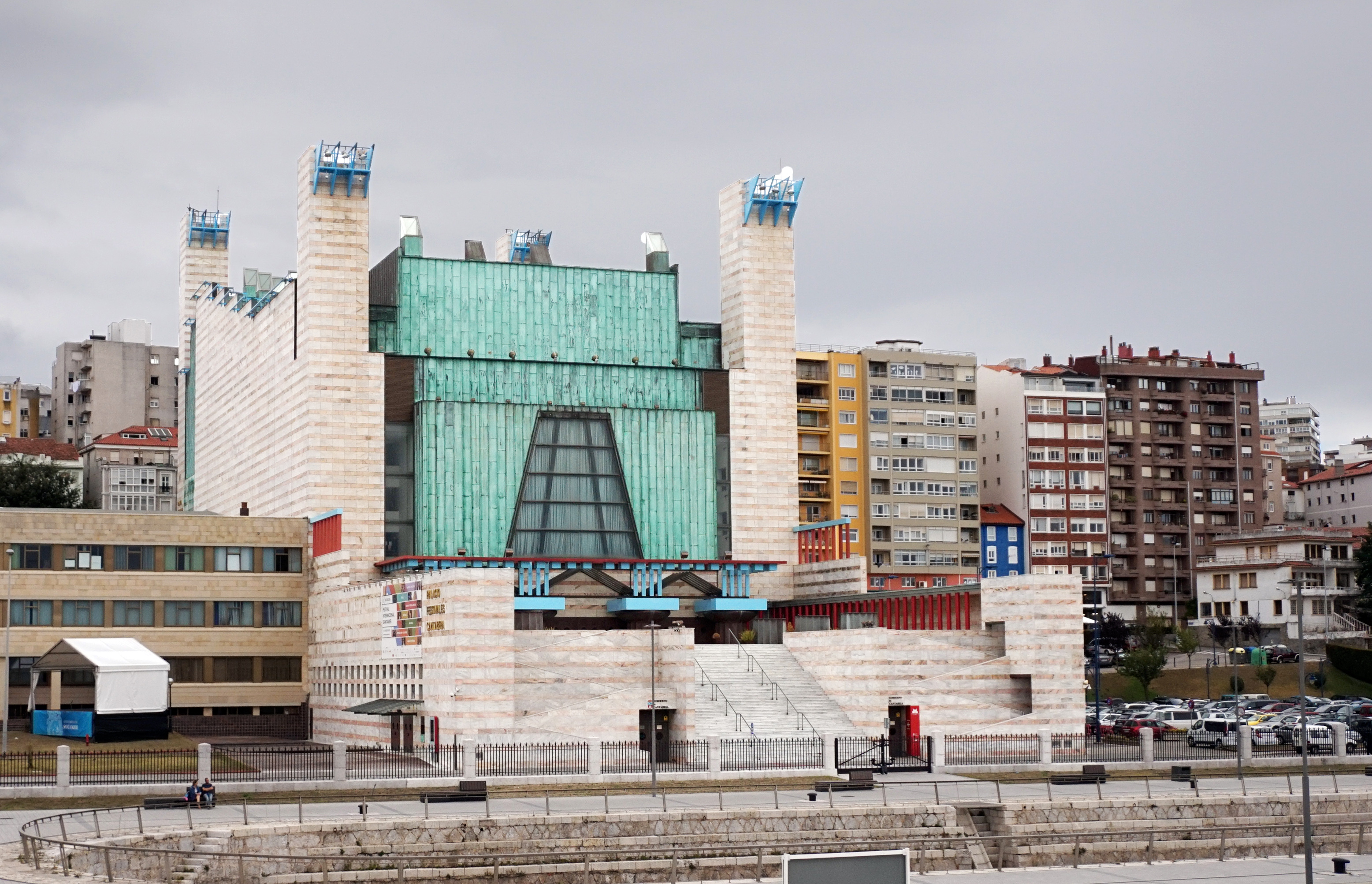
Palacio de Festivales, the main performance venue for the Festival Internacional de Santander

The Festival Internacional de Santander (FIS) is one of Spain's oldest music festivals. Each year, during the month of August it presents two to three operas as well as performances from visiting ballet and theatre companies, solo recitals, and choral, symphonic, and chamber music concerts. Its largest and main performing space is the Palacio de Festivales on the Calle Gamazo in Santander. However, performances are also held in fifty churches, cloisters, and parks both in Santander and in smaller towns in the Cantabria region.

From 1952 to 1990 the festival's main performance space was a gigantic tent in Santander's Plaza Porticada. The final performance there was a concert by the Norwegian Chamber Orchestra and Mstislav Rostropovich on August 30, 1990.

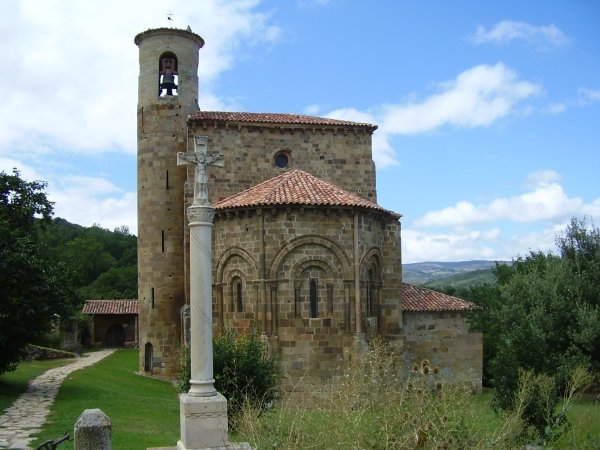
San Martín de Elines, one of the historic churches which serve as performance venues for the festival

Upon its completion in 1991, the Palacio de Festivales, became the festival's new home. It was inaugurated with a performance by The King's Consort of Handel's oratorio Joshua. The building was designed by Francisco Javier Sáenz de Oiza. Its main auditorium, the Sala Argenta, is noted for its transparent and natural-sounding acoustics and has a seating capacity of 1670. Unusually, the backdrop of its stage is a large window looking out onto the Bay of Santander. The auditorium is named in honour of the Spanish conductor Ataúlfo Argenta, who played a major role in the establishment of the festival.

The festival had its beginnings in 1948 as a programme providing cultural entertainment to the foreign students at the Menéndez Pelayo International University. By 1952 it had become a fully fledged international music festival with José Manuel Riancho as its first director. José Luis Ocejo, a noted conductor and founder of the Coral Salvé de Laredo, has been its director since 1979. Many of the festival's performances are broadcast live on Spanish National Radio (RTVE). The RTVE-Música label has issued eight of these performances on CD, including the 2003 production of Simon Boccanegra and the Berlin Philharmonic's 2004 concert of works by Mahler, Bruckner and Beethoven.

Amongst the many distinguished conductors, musicians and singers who have appeared at the Festival Internacional de Santander over the years are: Zubin Mehta, Georg Solti, Riccardo Muti, Arthur Rubinstein, Alicia de Larrocha, Daniel Barenboim, Diletta Rizzo Marin, Montserrat Caballé, Teresa Berganza, Samuel Ramey, Juan Diego Flórez, Mirella Freni, José Carreras, and Plácido Domingo, who made his Kirov Opera debut in the title role of Otello when the company performed at the festival in 1992.

== See also ==
- List of classical music festivals
