= La Nueva España (composition) =

Symphonic poems

- by Lorenzo Ferrero
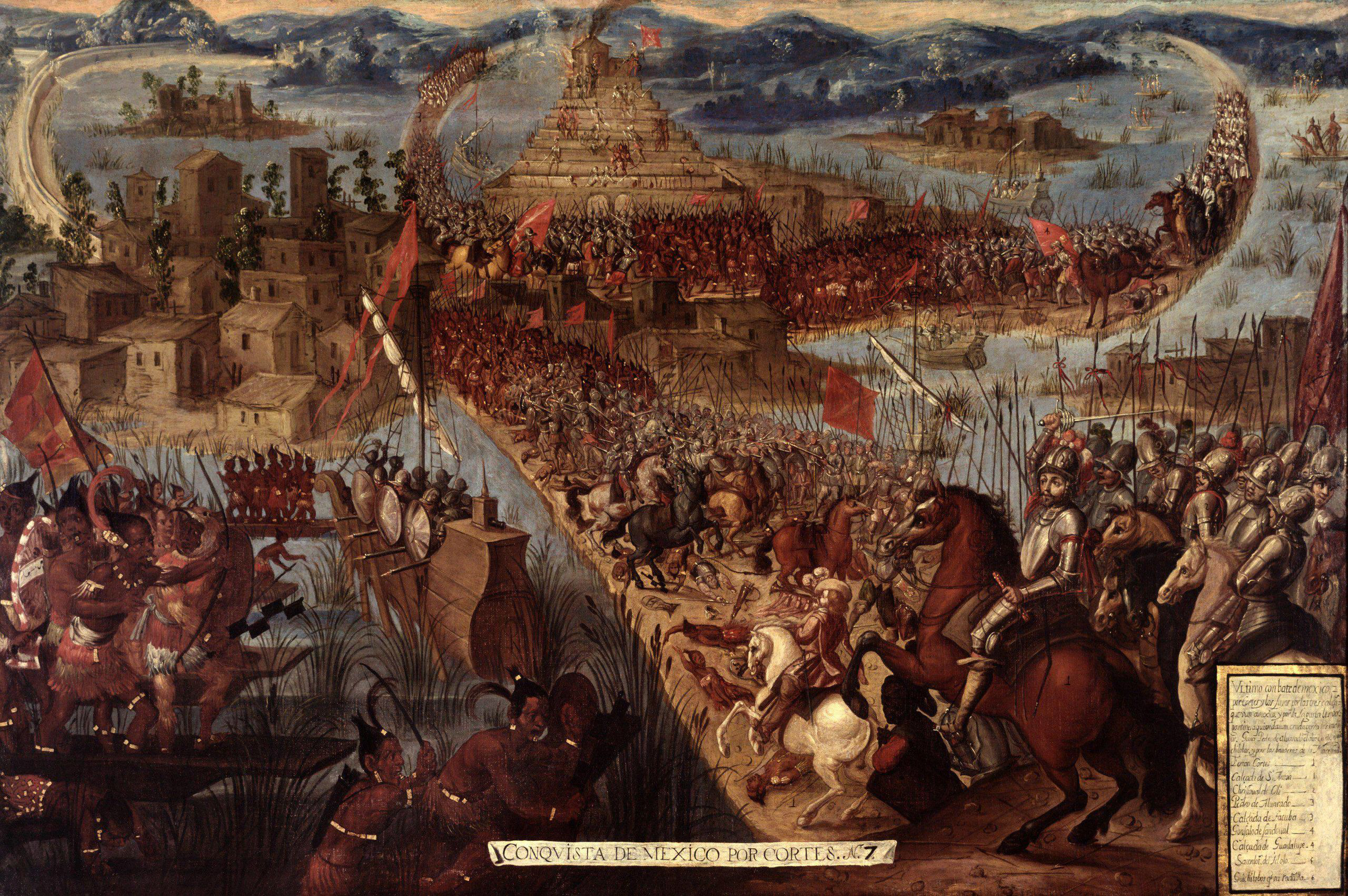
- Conquest of Mexico by Cortés, 17th-century painting
- Genre: Set of six symphonic poems
- Publisher: Casa Ricordi
- Recorded: 1998 Different Views (CD recording. BMG Ricordi); 2000 La Nueva España (CD recording. Naxos Records)
- Duration: 70 mins.
- Scoring: Symphonic orchestra

La Nueva España is a set of six symphonic poems by Lorenzo Ferrero written between 1990 and 1999, which is dedicated to the Spanish conquest of Mexico (once called the New Spain) in 1519–21. The suite can be considered a kind of preparatory study to the opera La Conquista (Prague National Theatre, 2005). This story—says the composer—is of great relevance and reminds us that cultural diversity is a precious asset that must not be squandered.

A typical performance lasts about one hour and ten minutes.

== Analysis ==
The poems can be performed individually or together. The compositional concept that underlines the cycle confirms the theatrical nature of Ferrero; each piece has its own colour, a specific character, but at the same time subtle thematic links hold the parts together, according to a well-calculated interplay of rhythmic, melodic and harmonic references.

The cycle follows the chronological order of the historical events:

1. Presagios: the Aztec chronicles prophesy disaster in the years preceding the arrival of the Spanish.
2. Memoria del fuego: having laid anchor at Veracruz, Hernán Cortés orders the scuttling of the ships, to prevent mutiny by the crew.
3. La ruta de Cortés: the Spaniards set out across inaccessible mountains and after a march of more than a thousand kilometres they reach the Valley of Mexico.
4. El encuentro: Moctezuma and Cortés meet on the Great Causeway leading into the capital, Tenochtitlan.
5. La matanza del Templo Mayor: in the absence of Cortés and taking advantage of the religious ceremonies of the Aztecs in the Templo Mayor, the Spanish massacre them.
6. La noche triste: the Aztecs revolt and temporarily drive out the invaders. In their retreat, the Spanish suffer heavy casualties and legend has it that Cortés wept over their losses. This episode is called La Noche Triste and the old tree where this allegedly happened is still a monument in Mexico.

== Instrumentation ==
La Nueva España is scored for 2 flutes (also piccolo and bass flute), 2 oboe, cor anglais, 2 clarinets, bass clarinet, 2 bassoons, contrabassoon, 4 French horns, 2 trumpets, 3 trombones, tuba, harpe, piano, celesta, timpani, 3 percussions, and strings.

== Discography ==
In chronological order of recording:

- 1998. Lorenzo Ferrero: Different Views. CD recording (partial). BMG Ricordi.
- 2000. Lorenzo Ferrero: La Nueva España. CD recording. Naxos Records.
