= La figlia del mago =

Opera by Lorenzo Ferrero

- Children's opera by Lorenzo Ferrero
- Translation: The Sorcerer's Daughter
- Librettist: Marco Ravasini
- Language: imaginary language
- Based on: Quei più modesti romanzi: il libretto nel melodramma di Verdi by Mario Lavagetto
- Premiere: 31 July 1981; Cantiere Internazionale d'Arte, Montepulciano

La figlia del mago (The Sorcerer's Daughter) is a children's opera in two acts by Lorenzo Ferrero set to an Italian-language libretto by Marco Ravasini. It was completed in 1981 and subtitled giocodramma melodioso, a wordplay on melodramma giocoso. The libretto, inspired by Mario Lavagetto's 1979 book Quei più modesti romanzi: il libretto nel melodramma di Verdi, is written in an imaginary language which emphasises the element of play. The music is a sequence of closed numbers "which spoof the most common operatic conventions." The aim of the opera is to show children how Italian opera functions. Alongside professional singers, children take mime roles.

== Performance history ==
The premiere directed by Caterina Mattea and conducted by Jan Latham-Koenig took place in Montepulciano, at the Cantiere Internazionale d'Arte on 31 July 1981. The opera had many subsequent new productions: at the Teatro Comunale, Florence on 23 November 1991; at La Scala in Milan on 11 March 1992; in Naples at Teatro di San Carlo on 7 March 1995; in Rouen at Opéra de Rouen on 8 November 1992; in Mâcon at the Scène Nationale on 27 March 1993; at Palm Beach Opera on 17 October 1993; in Helsinki at the Finnish National Theatre on 4 May 1994; in Brighton at the Brighton Festival on 22 May 1997; in Milan, as a school project of Caravaggio and Carducci High Schools, on 22 May 2000; in Kiel at the Fischmarkthalle Kiel-Wellingdorf (fish market) on 30 May 2008.

== Roles ==
Role	Voice type	Premiere cast, July 31, 1981 Conductor: Jan Latham-Koenig
Princess Soprano, King Bass' daughter	soprano	Lauretta Perasso
Prince Tenor, King Baritone's son	tenor	Gianni Mastino
King Baritone	baritone	Denis Krief
King Bass, The Sorcerer	bass	Roberto Scandiuzzi
Dancing mimes, sailors, soldiers, a fantastic horse, an odd bird, a sea monster.

== Synopsis ==
Act 1

On a dark, stormy night a ship makes a desperate attempt to land. Prince Tenor returns from an exotic place with his fiancée, Princess Soprano, and with handsome travel gifts, including two exotic animals. Tenor's father, King Baritone, utterly rejects the princess because she is both a foreigner and the offspring of a sorcerer. Soprano's father, King Bass, arrives accompanied by his pet sea monster and tries to persuade his daughter to come back home. As she refuses, he uses his magic powers to make the animals attack Baritone's court. During the ensuing battle, Tenor runs to the defence of his father and manages to save him. In spite of this demonstration of his worth he is still denied permission to marry Soprano.

Act 2

In his bedroom, King Baritone is having a restless night. King Bass' sea monster enters and is about to attack him when, once again, Tenor rushes in and puts the monster to flight. Waking up, King Baritone catches Tenor with the sword in his hand and accuses him of attempted patricide. He condemns Tenor and Soprano to death and throws them into prison. Just as they are about to be executed King Bass bursts in to liberate his daughter, but she seizes his magic wand and casts a spell which forces the two fathers to perform a frantic dance until they beg for mercy and give their consent for the marriage. There is general rejoicing as preparations are made for the wedding ceremony. Everyone, including the two fantastic animals and the sea monster, joins in.
