= Salvatore Giuliano (opera) =

Opera by Lorenzo Ferrero

- Opera by Lorenzo Ferrero
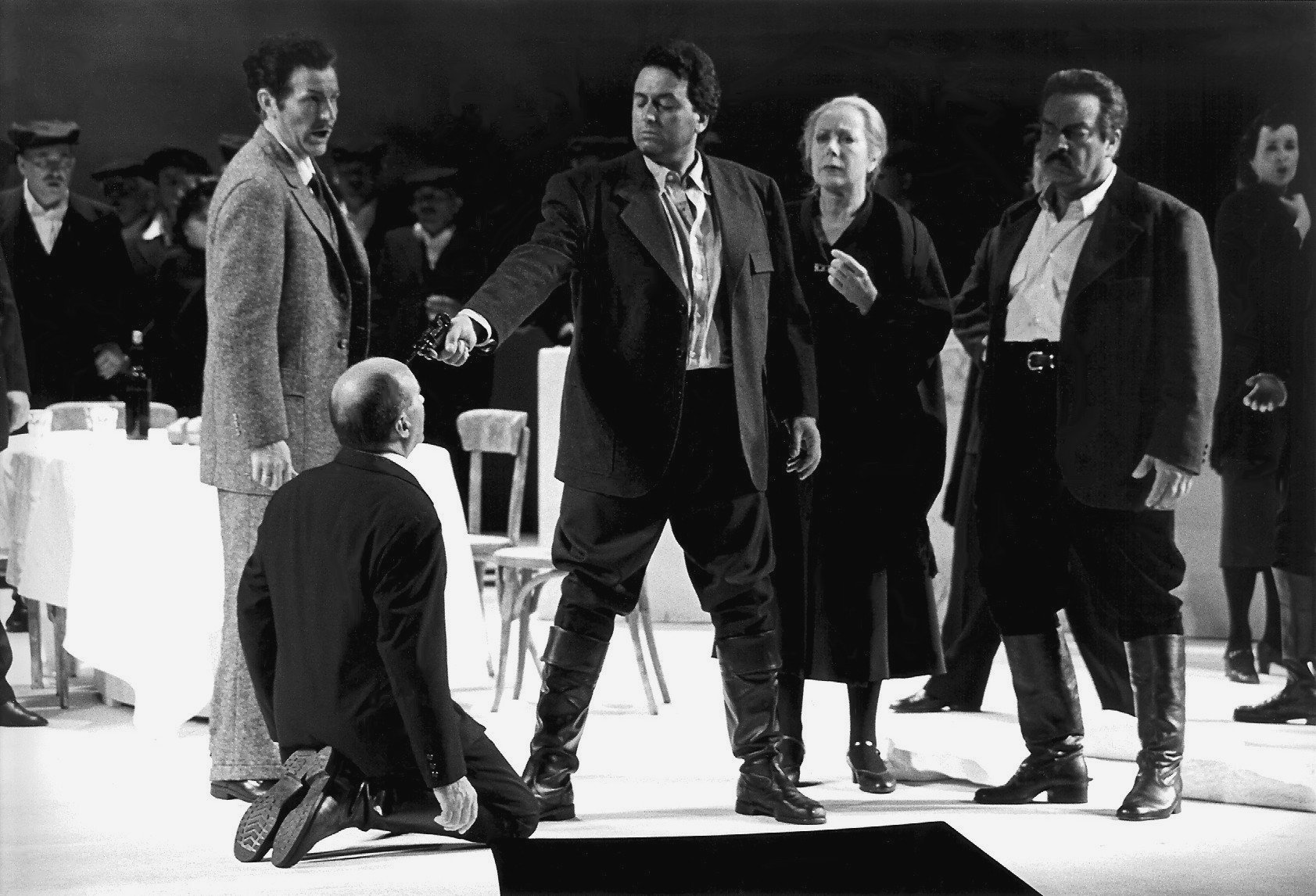
- A scene, Staatstheater Kassel, 1996
- Librettist: Giuseppe Di Leva
- Language: Italian
- Based on: Life of Salvatore Giuliano
- Premiere: 25 January 1986; Teatro dell'Opera di Roma

Salvatore Giuliano is an opera in one act by Lorenzo Ferrero to an Italian-language libretto by Giuseppe Di Leva, which was conceived to be performed in tandem with Pietro Mascagni's Cavalleria rusticana. The work was commissioned by the Teatro dell'Opera di Roma and premiered there on 25 January 1986.

Set in Sicily, the story is based on the life of the legendary historical figure Salvatore Giuliano (1922–1950), a Sicilian peasant who fought the Italian authorities in the name of a separatist movement.

== Performance history ==
The original production directed by Luciano Damiani and conducted by Gustav Kuhn became the subject of a monograph entitled Nascita di un'opera: Salvatore Giuliano, which was published in 1987 by photographer Lorenzo Capellini. The opera had two subsequent new productions in Germany, one conducted by Frank Cramer which was performed at Mainfranken Theater Würzburg on 13 May 1987 and the second conducted by Johannes Wedekind at the Staatstheater Kassel on 8 June 1996.

== Roles ==
Role	Voice type	Premiere cast, January 25, 1986 (Conductor: Gustav Kuhn)
Salvatore Giuliano	tenor	Nicola Martinucci
Gaspare Pisciotta, his lieutenant	baritone	Franco Giovine
The mother of Giuliano	mezzo-soprano	Giovanna Casolla
Maria, a journalist	lyric soprano	Zorayda Salazar
Colonel Luca	bass	Roberto Scandiuzzi
A Mafioso	bass-baritone	Giovanni De Angelis
A representative of EVIS	bass	Vito Maria Brunetti
Pasquale Sciortino, Giuliano's brother-in-law	tenor	Mario Ferrara
Inhabitants of Montelepre, members of Giuliano's band, Carabinieri, soldiers, chorus and offstage soprano voice.

== Synopsis ==
Place: Western Sicily, Montelepre and surrounding mountains
Time: The second half of the 1940s

In an empty village at dawn a shot is heard and there is a glimpse of a man running. When the village awakes a representative of EVIS, the Volunteer Army for the Independence of Sicily, arrives to address the inhabitants and to introduce Salvatore Giuliano to them. In his speech, the man incites the villagers to endorse EVIS' fight for independence. After pledging his support to the cause, Giuliano remains alone with his lieutenant, Gaspare Pisciotta. They are discussing how to liberate Giuliano's mother from prison when, unexpectedly, she returns to him escorted by a Mafioso. Giuliano realizes that he has contracted a debt with the Mafia.

In his mountain stronghold, Giuliano relates his life story to Maria, a Swedish journalist who came to interview him. He recalls that he became a bandit by chance, due to poverty and the injustice of the Italian state. He confesses that he hopes for a pardon and emigration to America. The interview is interrupted by the Mafioso who returned to claim his dues. He asks Giuliano to attack the communists' Labour Day parade at Portella della Ginestra in exchange for Mafia protection and help with his request for amnesty. Giuliano agrees.

After the massacre, Colonel Ugo Luca, the head of the newly formed special police force for the suppression of banditry, ponders about the Minister's order to liquidate Giuliano because by now he knows too much. In the meantime, at his sister's wedding reception Giuliano carries out an irreparable act and executes five Mafiosi, who came to inform him that a reward for his capture has been set by the authorities in Rome. Appalled by this crime the Mafioso meets Colonel Luca and, while the police are carrying away the corpses, they agree to unite their forces against Giuliano. Pisciotta is summoned to the Colonel, who succeeds in convincing him to betray Giuliano, in exchange for his own life. In a desperate final attempt, Pisciotta tries to persuade Giuliano to escape but he refuses to leave. In the empty village, as in the beginning, the shadows of two men appear on the background: one shoots and the other falls. The village lights go out and the voice of a woman is heard calling: "Giuliano!"

== Notable arias and excerpts ==
The orchestral Intermezzo depicting the Portella della Ginestra massacre and Giuliano's aria "Poi andrò in America" were arranged as excerpts for concert performance. The aria was first performed at the Palm Beach Opera in February, 1992.

== See also ==
- Salvatore Giuliano, a 1962 Italian film directed by Francesco Rosi
- The Sicilian, a novel by Mario Puzo based on the life of Salvatore Giuliano
- The Sicilian, a film based on the novel, directed by Michael Cimino
