= Marilyn (opera) =

Opera by Lorenzo Ferrero

- by Lorenzo Ferrero
- Librettist: Ferrero; Floriana Bossi
- Language: English and the language of the country in which it is performed
- Based on: Life of Marilyn Monroe
- Premiere: 23 February 1980; Teatro dell'Opera di Roma

Marilyn: Scenes from the '50s in two acts, is an opera by Lorenzo Ferrero set to a bilingual libretto by Floriana Bossi and the composer. The text consists of a collection of fragments taken from original political, social and cultural documents and has two different linguistic levels: English for the sung parts (entrusted exclusively to four characters), and the language of the country in which the performance takes place for the spoken parts.

Set in two spaces, one of which represents the personal life of Marilyn Monroe (1926–1962) and the other which depicts moments of American political and civic life, the story interweaves the myth and decline of the movie star up to her mysterious death, with accounts of significant past events: the Korean War, the McCarthy era investigations, the prosecution of Wilhelm Reich, and the lectures of Timothy Leary on the use of psychedelic drugs. Marilyn is seen as an involuntary victim of the mass culture of her time, a figure only superficially serene and optimistic, a heroine in spite of herself, whose contradictory personality is represented in twelve scenes, equally distributed in the two acts.

The music is a mixture of styles and the theme itself suggest an Italian version of postmodernism. Neo-tonal materials, already adumbrating the synthesis of 19th-century opera and postwar popular music typical of his later works, are mixed with modernist orchestral textures.

== Performance history ==
The opera was first performed at the Teatro dell'Opera di Roma on 23 February 1980. Following the Rome premiere conducted by Gianluigi Gelmetti and directed by Maria Francesca Siciliani, the work had several subsequent new productions: in Germany for documenta, at the Staatstheater Kassel on 18 June 1982, conducted by Alexander Sander; in Finland, at the Vaasa theatre on 14 January 1993, conducted by Martti Tiainen. That production was revived on 31 October 1995 at the Finnish National Theatre.

== Roles ==
Role	Voice type	Premiere cast, February 23, 1980 (Conductor: Gianluigi Gelmetti)
Marilyn Monroe, American actress	coloratura soprano	Emilia Ravaglia
Douglas MacArthur, American general	bass-baritone	Mario Basiola
Wilhelm Reich, Austrian psychoanalyst	lyric tenor	Robert Dumé
Allen Ginsberg, American poet	jazz-rock singer	Federico Troiani
Yves Montand, French singer and actor	actor	
Timothy Leary, American writer	actor	
Majorettes, intellectuals, soldiers, demonstrators, chorus, band on the stage, extras; 19 speaking roles, to be distributed between 8 or more actors.

== Synopsis ==
Place: Unspecified. A division of the stage into two compartments is required: one private space for Marilyn and one space where all the other actions take place.
Time: The second half of the 20th century.

=== Act 1 ===
In Central Park a band intones the American national anthem and starts marching together with a group of majorettes. In her own space, Marilyn thinks of her unhappy childhood. In Korea, standing amongst the casualties, General MacArthur is reinvigorating his troops and recounting his speech to Congress in favour of the war. Marilyn reflects on her life and complains about being considered as just a sex symbol. Various characters suspected of belonging to the American Communist Party appear before the House Committee on Un-American Activities for interrogation. Marilyn calls Doctor Johnson on the phone and talks about her irrational fears of going insane, her feelings of loneliness, emptiness, and depersonalization. In the background books are being burned, including those by Wilhelm Reich. The psychiatrist, on the brink of madness, is taken off to prison. In an imaginary duet with Marilyn, he rants about being persecuted like Christ whilst she speaks about her distress.

=== Act 2 ===
A group of poets of the Beat Generation gather around Allen Ginsberg in the smoky atmosphere of an underground cellar where Bebop music is played. They talk of Marilyn's death and look towards the East for hope in the guise of Buddha and Nirvana. Marilyn has supper with Yves Montand and gives him one of her poems. Left alone, she sings a hymn to the night. A silent pacifist demonstration files past and is broken up by the police. Marilyn phones her analyst again, then receives the visit of a mysterious person who slaps her. Timothy Leary lectures on the effects of LSD, Mescaline and Psilocybin and incites the audience to experiment with drugs. The police puts an end to the general delirium by carrying everyone away. Marilyn, in a hopeless state, under the influence of alcohol and barbiturates, speaks to a doll about her despair. The threatening shadows of two male figures appear on the background. Help! Help! she calls...

The marching majorettes step indifferently over Marilyn's corpse to the sound of the American anthem whilst the crowd is celebrating The American Way of Life.

== Notable arias and excerpts ==
Marilyn's aria Night of the Nite was published as excerpt for concert performance and a Marilyn Suite was performed by the Orchestra della RAI di Milano in 1981 and at the Donaueschingen Festival in 1982.
