= Franca Florio, regina di Palermo =

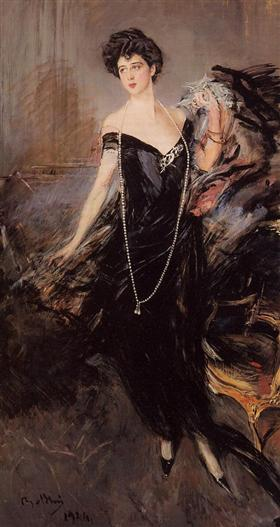
- Portrait of Donna Franca by Giovanni Boldini.
- Choreographer: Luciano Cannito
- Music: Lorenzo Ferrero
- Premiere: 22 November 2007; Teatro Massimo, Palermo
- Setting: Sicily
- Type: Narrative ballet

Franca Florio, regina di Palermo is a full-length narrative ballet in two acts, with music by Lorenzo Ferrero and scenario, choreography and staging by Luciano Cannito. A commission by the Teatro Massimo in Palermo, the work premiered there on 22 November 2007 with Carla Fracci in the title role, and was restaged in June 2010.

Set in Sicily, the story is based on the life of Franca Jacona Notarbartolo di San Giuliano (1873-1950), a famous Sicilian aristocrat whose beauty inspired many artists, musicians, and poets during the Belle Époque, who retraces the highlights of her life from her retreat on the island of Favignana. Her past is explored chronologically, by means of extensive flashbacks of events. Florio's story, replete with worldly success but also with tragic events, is in part the metaphor of the failure of the industrial development in Sicily at the beginning of the twentieth century.

== Roles ==
The ballet employs a large corps de ballet and the lead, solo and minor roles are numerous.

The Florio family: Franca Florio; Ignazio Florio, Jr; Giovanna Florio, their daughter; the mother of Ignazio.

The Florios' guests: Wilhelm II, German Emperor; Empress Augusta Victoria; King Edward VII of England; Queen Alexandra; Russian prince; Russian princess.

Other characters: Vera Arrivabene; Giovanni Boldini; Colombina; the mother, father, and the cousins of Franca.

Foreign aristocrats, priest, personal assistants, butler, servants, fishermen, children, croupiers, men and women at the Casino.

== Synopsis and structure ==
List of acts and musical numbers, with their synopsis:

Number	Synopsis
Act 1
1	On the sea shore at Favignana a lonely old woman gives herself up to memories.
2	In her parents' house in Palermo young Franca is preparing to take a walk in the town, accompanied by her two inseparable cousins.
3	Assisted by his staff, Ignazio works diligently in his office until he decides to have a short break.
4	Franca strolls along the Marina di Palermo, admired by everybody. She is passed by Ignazio, who is in the company of his friend, Vera Arrivabene.
5	Ignazio and Franca's glances crisscross; his wish to make her acquaintance brings deep embarrassment to Vera.
6	Ignazio kisses Franca's hand and between the two of them there is love at first sight. Vera, left aside, is offended and embittered.
7	It seems that the world stops around them, but the arrival of her parents compels them to separate.
8	At Favignana, Franca rereads an old letter from Ignazio and is deeply moved.
9	Ignazio is neglecting his work and continuously sends notes to Franca. Her family is not enthusiastic about their daughter's relationship with a bourgeois, despite his great wealth.
10	Franca and Ignazio get married in Livorno and return to Palermo after the ceremony.
11	A grand wedding reception takes place there. The gathering is disrupted by Vera, who provokes a confrontation with Franca.
12	The guests leave. A long pas de deux precedes the wedding night.
Act 2
1	At Favignana, Franca lives with her memories, supported by the affection of the local fishermen.
2	Several years later, Franca and Ignazio become the leading lights of the high society and are still happily united. Together they go to the launch of the Aegusa, a luxury yacht which he gives her as a present.
3	During this event their little daughter faints and is taken home immediately. Her health deteriorates and the mother remains close to the child's bed until her death.
4	Preparations are made for the arrival of the Kaiser.
5	Wilhelm II and empress consort Augusta Victoria arrive with their retinue. Palermo celebrates together with the Florios.
6	They are also visited by the English royal family and other notables.
7	Various Russian princes arrive at Palermo, to vacation with the Florios.
8	A change comes about between the spouses after the tragic deaths of Giovanna and little Ignazio, nicknamed Baby Boy. Franca withdraws to her rooms and Ignazio, upset by his wife's spurning, succumbs to Vera's temptation.
9	Franca and Ignazio attend the inauguration of the Teatro Massimo. Backstage, he flirts with a ballerina while she elegantly pretends not to take notice.
10	The painter Boldini portraits Franca in increasingly risqué poses. Ignazio catches them and destroys the painting. Soon after, repenting, he presents her with a splendid pearl necklace and orders a new portrait from the painter.
11	Even though Ignazio's passion has vanished, Franca is expecting a baby again; she still loves him and would very much like to give him the male heir he longs for.
12	At Favignana, Franca relives the most dramatic events from her past.
13	In the Sanremo Casino Ignazio sits with Vera and flirts with other women under the gaze of Franca, who is sitting alone at another table. He gambles all his money away. Times have changed and the two leave separately.
14	The sun is setting down in Favignana. Franca, frail and lonely, lives on an island in the middle of a sea of memories. As a relic of her better days, Boldini's 1924 portrait slowly descends from above onto the stage.

== See also ==
- List of historical ballet characters
- Giovanni Boldini
- Wilhelm II, German Emperor
- Augusta Victoria of Schleswig-Holstein
- Edward VII
