= Roberto Scandiuzzi =

Italian opera singer

Roberto Scandiuzzi (born 14 July 1958) is an Italian opera singer noted for his powerful, sonorous bass voice and stage presence.

Scandiuzzi was born in Maserada sul Piave in the Province of Treviso and studied at the conservatory in Treviso. He made his operatic debut in 1981 at the Cantiere Internazionale d'Arte, where he created the role of King Bass, The Sorcerer in Lorenzo Ferrero's La figlia del mago. The following year he made his La Scala debut as Bartolo in Le nozze di Figaro and thereafter sang throughout Italy and in the major opera houses of Europe and the United States in leading bass roles, primarily in the Italian repertoire. Among his many recordings are Verdi's Don Carlos for Philips (as King Philip II), Simon Boccanegra for Decca (as Jacopo Fiesco), Jérusalem for Philips (as Roger), and Aroldo for Philips (as Briano).

Scandiuzzi's daughter Diletta Rizzo Marin is also an opera singer.

== Videography ==
- James Levine's 25th Anniversary Metropolitan Opera Gala (1996), Deutsche Grammophon DVD, B0004602-09
