= Risorgimento! =

Opera by Lorenzo Ferrero

- Opera by Lorenzo Ferrero
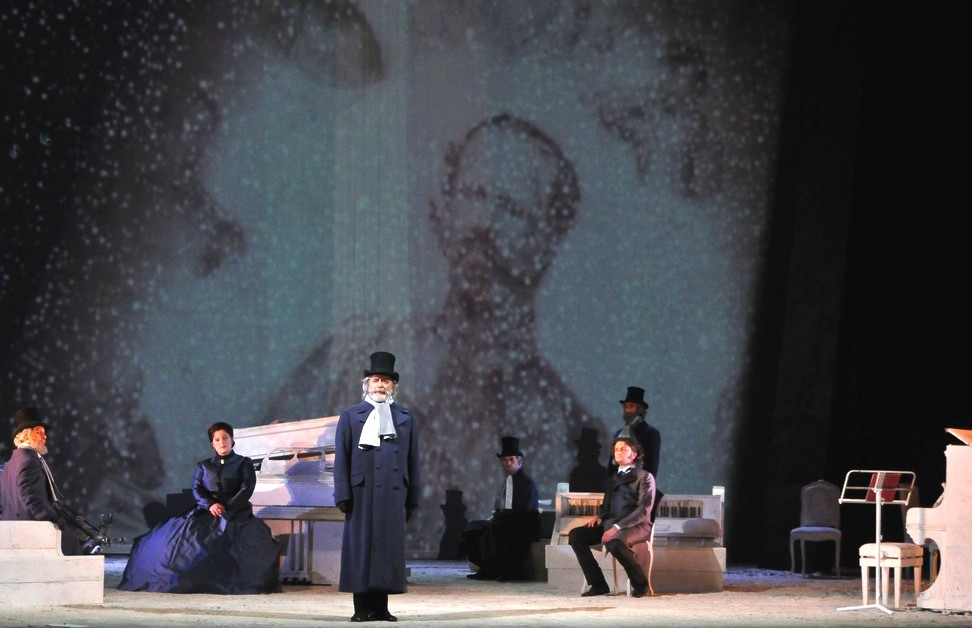
- The final scene
- Librettist: Dario Oliveri
- Language: Italian
- Premiere: 26 March 2011; Teatro Comunale Modena

Risorgimento! is an opera in one act by Lorenzo Ferrero set to an Italian-language libretto by Dario Oliveri, based on a scenario by the composer. It was completed in 2010 and first performed at the Teatro Comunale di Modena on 26 March 2011.

== Overview ==
The opera was commissioned by the Teatro Comunale di Bologna for the 150th anniversary of the Italian unification which was commemorated in 2011, and had there an initial run of six performances between April 5 and 16, coupled with Luigi Dallapiccola's Il prigioniero. The work mixes the story of one of the most well-known operas by Giuseppe Verdi, Nabucco, with social and cultural aspects of the Risorgimento, through a plot in which one is the reflection of the other.

The characters of the opera, according to the composer, engage in a debate about not only the Risorgimento but also the opera itself and its chances of success. They are, at least in part, the same as the interpreters of that first Nabucco (then titled Nabucodonosor), which was staged at La Scala on 9 March 1842.

== Roles ==
Role	Voice type	Premiere cast, 26 March 2011 (Conductor: Michele Mariotti)
Bartolomeo Merelli, impresario	baritone	Alessandro Luongo
Giuseppina Strepponi, opera singer	lyric soprano	Valentina Corradetti
Giovannina Bellinzaghi, opera singer	mezzo-soprano	Annunziata Vestri
Luigi Barbiano di Belgioioso, Milanese patrician	tenor	Leonardo Cortellazzi
Maestro sostituto, rehearsal pianist	bass	Alessandro Spina
Giuseppe Verdi, composer	spoken role	Umberto Bortolani
Offstage chorus, dancer, silent figures.

== Synopsis ==
Place: La Scala, Milan.
Time: February 1842.

In a room inside the theatre the répétiteur (Maestro sostituto) is rehearsing with Giovannina Bellinzaghi Fenena's prayer from the fourth act of the opera Nabucco. The singer is expressing her doubts about the subject and about the artistic value of the work. During the dialogue enters impresario Bartolomeo Merelli, who defends the composer and his opera. He evokes the genesis of Nabucco and reveals his preoccupation with the Austrian censorship. The rehearsal pianist and the singer leave. Alone on the stage, Merelli is reflecting on the young Verdi and on the fact that his companion, Giuseppina Strepponi, seems attracted to him. The pianist returns and waits with Merelli for the arrival of Strepponi. The impresario talks about his intention to stage at La Scala Pacini's opera Saffo. When the singer finally arrives, he asks her to work on Saffo's aria, but she prefers Verdi's music and starts rehearsing Abigaille's trio instead. Her song turns into a dream in which she confesses that she feels a strange attraction for Verdi and his music.

Merelli and the pianist return and are joined by Luigi Barbiano, Conte di Belgioioso, who brings the approval of the libretto. An excited political discussion follows between the Maestro sostituto and the count, who ends up by being offended and walks off, slamming the door. Merelli and Strepponi follow him. The pianist regrets letting himself get carried away and restarts rehearsing with Bellinzaghi. Fenena's prayer, too, dissolves itself in a dream, which anticipates the triumphal debut of the opera and re-elaborates various images of the Risorgimento. At the end of the dream, Giuseppe Verdi appears, aged and now Senator of the Kingdom. In his monologue he interweaves the nostalgia for the past with his preoccupation for the uncertain future.
