= Lorenzo Ferrero =

Italian composer (born 1951)

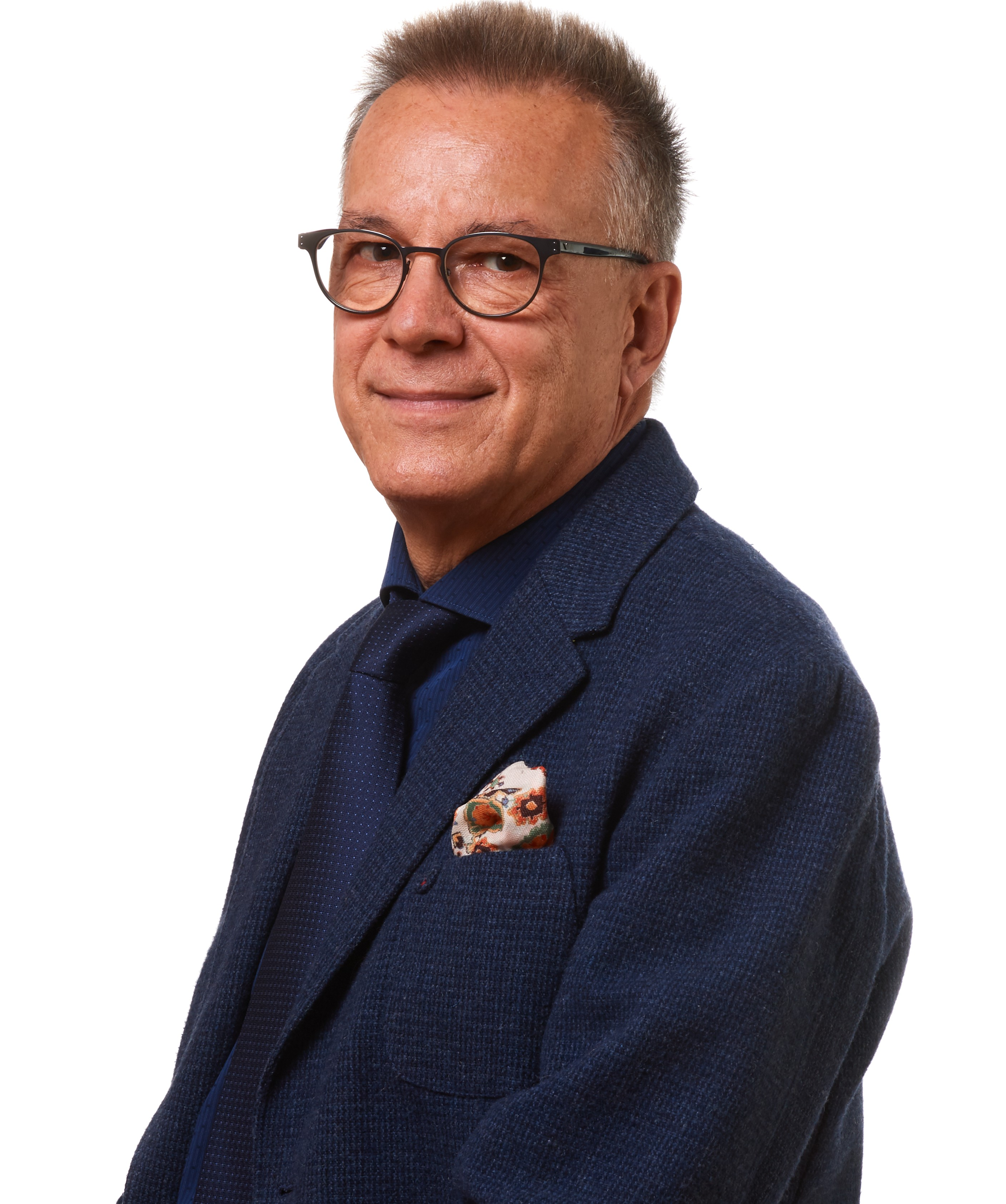
Lorenzo Ferrero

Lorenzo Ferrero (Italian pronunciation: [loˈrɛntso ferˈrɛːro]; born 1951) is an Italian composer, librettist, author, and book editor. He started composing at an early age and has written over a hundred compositions thus far, including twelve operas, three ballets, four piano concertos, and numerous orchestral, chamber music, solo instrumental, and vocal works. His musical idiom is characterized by eclecticism, stylistic versatility, and a neo-tonal language.

== Biography ==
Born in Turin, he studied composition from 1969 to 1973 with Massimo Bruni and Enore Zaffiri at Turin Music Conservatory, and philosophy with Gianni Vattimo and Massimo Mila at the University of Turin, earning a degree in aesthetics with a thesis on John Cage in 1974.

His early interest in the psychology of perception and psychoacoustics led him to IMEB, the International Electroacoustic Music Institute of Bourges, where he did research on electronic music between 1972 and 1973, IRCAM in Paris, and to the Musik/Dia/Licht/Film Galerie in Munich in 1974.

Lorenzo Ferrero has received commissions from numerous festivals and institutions, his works being constantly performed throughout Europe and North America, particularly in Italy, Germany, France, Great Britain, Spain, Finland, Russia, the Czech Republic, and the United States.

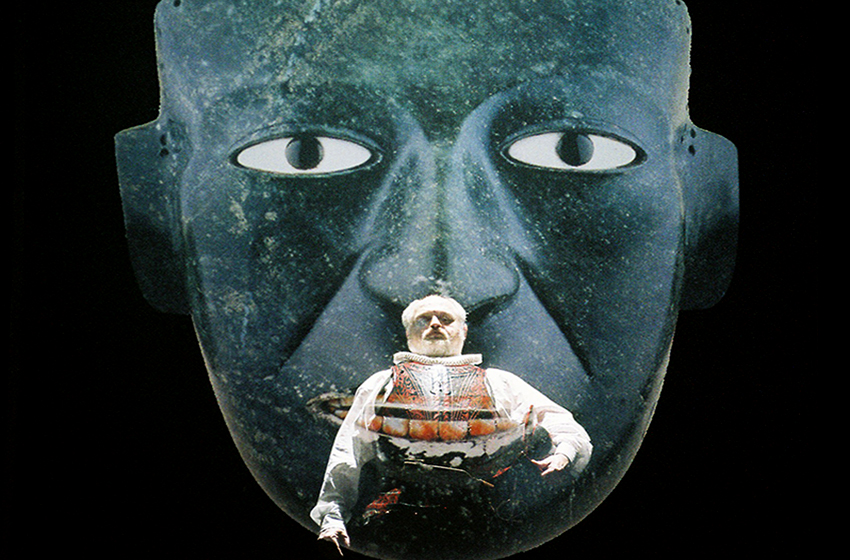
Scene from the opera La Conquista, 2005

His most popular compositions include the operas Marilyn, La figlia del mago, Salvatore Giuliano, Charlotte Corday, La Conquista, and Risorgimento!, the first Piano Concerto, the Concerto for Violin, Cello, Piano and Orchestra, the set of six symphonic poems La Nueva España, the song cycle Canzoni d'amore, the Capriccio for Piano and String Orchestra, Parodia, Ostinato, Glamorama Spies, Tempi di quartetto for string quartet, and the ballet Franca Florio, regina di Palermo. In 1986, he participated in the Prix Italia with his work La fuga di Foscolo. His music is published by Casa Ricordi, Milan.

As an active manager of art events, he has served as artistic director of the Festival Puccini in Torre del Lago (1980–84), "Unione Musicale" in Turin (1983–87), Arena di Verona Festival (1991–94), and the "Musica 2000" fair. In 1999 he co-founded and coordinated the "Festa della Musica", a showcase of classical, jazz and world music held in Milan, and four years later, he managed the Ravello Festival.

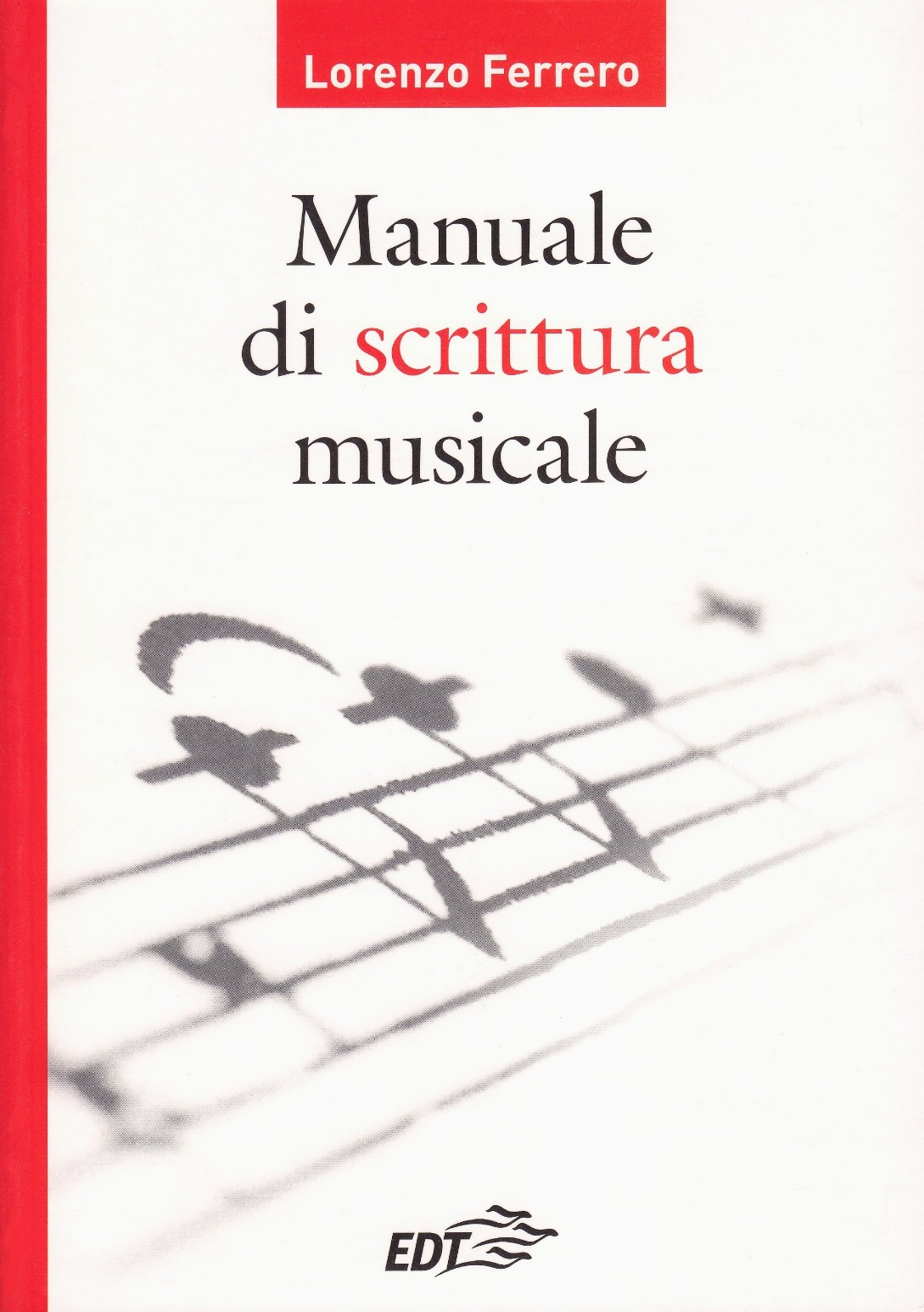

In 2007, Lorenzo Ferrero was appointed to the board of directors and elected vice-president of SIAE, the Italian Authors and Publishers Association. That same year he published the Manuale di scrittura musicale, a manual which describes the basic rules of correct and elegant music writing from the orthographic as well as the graphic point of view, which is addressed to all composers, musicologists, teachers, students and copy-editors in need of practical advice. In 2008 he translated, edited and published Lo studio dell'orchestrazione, the Italian edition of Samuel Adler's The Study of Orchestration, a landmark orchestration manual.

Lorenzo Ferrero was professor of composition at Milan Conservatory from 1980 to 2016. His teaching appointments also include positions at St. Mary's College of Maryland and LUISS Business School, a division of LUISS Guido Carli University of Rome. Moreover, as a member of the Italian National Union of Composers, Librettists and Authors, he co-founded ECSA, the European Composer and Songwriter Alliance, and between 2011 and 2017, he was president of CIAM, the International Council of Music Authors. In 2017, he was appointed honorary president of CIAM.

Lorenzo Ferrero was described in The New Grove Dictionary of Opera as "the most successful opera composer of his generation in Italy" and in The New Penguin Opera Guide as "a principal exponent of the neo-tonal tendencies common to a number of Italian composers of his generation, who has championed a brand of narrative music-theatre that aims to capture a wider audience than that achieved by the heirs of the modernist tradition."

== Works ==
In addition to the original works listed below, Lorenzo Ferrero completed the orchestration of the third version of the opera La rondine by Giacomo Puccini, which was subsequently premiered at Teatro Regio di Torino on 22 March 1994. With a group of six other Italian composers, he wrote the Requiem per le vittime della mafia, a collaborative composition for soloists, choir and orchestra on an Italian text by Vincenzo Consolo. The requiem was first performed in the Palermo Cathedral on 27 March 1993. Furthermore, he wrote the music for the Sestriere Alpine World Ski Championships opening ceremony of 1997 including the official anthem, incidental music for stage productions, and a film score. British musicologist David Osmond-Smith described his style as "an unabashed synthesis of classical traditions and pop [...] that never forgets its 19th-century precursors."

=== Opera ===
- Rimbaud, ou Le Fils du soleil (1978), quasi un melodramma in three acts
- Marilyn (1980), scenes from the '50s in two acts
- La figlia del mago (1981), giocodramma melodioso in two acts
- Mare nostro (1985), comic opera in two acts
- Night (1985), opera in one act
- Salvatore Giuliano (1986), opera in one act
- Charlotte Corday (1989), opera in three acts
- Le Bleu-blanc-rouge et le noir (1989), marionette opera
- La nascita di Orfeo (1996), musical action in one act
- La Conquista (2005), opera in two acts
- Le piccole storie: Ai margini delle guerre (2007), chamber opera in one act
- Risorgimento! (2011), opera in one act

=== Ballet ===
- Invito a nozze (1978), ballet
- Lotus Eaters (1985), ballet
- Franca Florio, regina di Palermo (2007), ballet in two acts

=== Orchestral music ===
- Ellipse IV (Waldmusik) (1977), for folk ensemble ad libitum
- Romanza seconda (1977), for bassoon and strings
- Arioso (1977), for orchestra and live electronics
- Arioso II (1981), for large orchestra
- Balletto (1981), for orchestra
- My Blues (1982), for string orchestra
- Thema 44 (ad honorem J. Haydn) (1982), for small orchestra
- Ombres (1984), for orchestra and live electronics
- The Miracle (1985), suite for orchestra
- Intermezzo notturno from Mare nostro (1985), for small orchestra
- Intermezzo "Portella della Ginestra" from Salvatore Giuliano (1986), for orchestra
- Four Modern Dances (1990), for small orchestra
- Zaubermarsch (1990), for small orchestra
- Concerto for Piano and Orchestra (1991)
- Paesaggio con figura (1994), for small orchestra
- Concerto for Violin, Cello, Piano and Orchestra (1994–95)
- Palm Beach Overture (1995), for orchestra
- Capriccio for Piano and String Orchestra (1996)
- Three Baroque Buildings (1997), for bassoon, trumpet, and strings
- Championship Suite (1997), for large orchestra
- Storie di neve (1997), music for the Alpine World Ski Championships opening ceremony
- La Nueva España (1992–99), a set of six symphonic poems
  - La ruta de Cortés (1992)
  - La noche triste (1996)
  - Memoria del fuego (1998)
  - Presagios (1999)
  - El encuentro (1999)
  - La matanza del Templo Mayor (1999)
- Rastrelli in Saint Petersburg (2000), for oboe and string orchestra
- Two Cathedrals in the South (2001), for trumpet and string orchestra
- Five Easy Pieces (2002), transcription for orchestra
- Guarini, the Master (2004), for violin and strings
- DEsCH (2006), for oboe, bassoon, piano, and orchestra
- Quattro variazioni su un tema di Banchieri: 2 Agosto. Prima variazione (2008), for organ and orchestra
- Piano Concerto No. 2 (2009)
- Fantasy Suite No. 2 (2009), for violin and orchestra
- Piano Concerto No. 3 (2022)
- Stetched lines (2022), for chamber orchestra
- Garden Streamers (2023), for trumpet and strings
- Library Music Symphonies 1-2-3 (2024), for small orchestra
- Fantasy Suite No.2 (2025), for orchestra
- Festive Ouverture (2025), for orchestra
- Piano Concerto No. 4 (2026)

=== Chamber and instrumental music ===
- Primavera che non vi rincresca (1971), electronic tape piece
- Ellipse III (1974), for any 4 players/ensembles
- Siglied (1975), for chamber orchestra
- Romanza senza parole (1976), for chamber ensemble
- Adagio cantabile (1977), for chamber ensemble
- Variazioni sulla notte (1980), for guitar
- Respiri (1982), for flute and piano
- Soleils (1982), for harp
- Ellipse (1983), for flute
- Onde (1983), for guitar
- My Rock (1985), (versions for piano and for big band)
- Empty Stage (1985), for 4 clarinets and piano
- My Blues (1986), for flute and piano
- Passacaglia (1986), for flute, clarinet, and string quartet
- Ostinato (1987), for 6 violoncelli
- Parodia (1990), for chamber ensemble
- Discanto sulla musica sull'acqua di Handel (1990), for flute, oboe, clarinet, bass clarinet, French horn, and percussion
- Cadenza (1990), for clarinet and marimba
- Musica per un paesaggio (1990), for small orchestra
- Movimento americano (1992), for oboe, clarinet, bassoon, and string quartet
- Ostinato (1993), for two violoncelli and strings
- Portrait (1994), for string quartet
- Seven Seconds (1995), for clarinet, violin, and piano
- Shadow Lines (1995), for bass flute and live electronics
- My Piece of Africa (1996), for violin, viola, violoncello, and contrabass
- Five Easy Pieces (1997), for flute and piano (version of a piano work)
- Tempi di quartetto (1996–98), for string quartet
- Glamorama Spies (1999), for flute, clarinet, violin, violoncello, and piano
- Sonata (2000), for viola and piano
- Moonlight Sonata (2001), for 5 percussion instruments
- Three Baroque Buildings in a Frame (2002), for flute and string quartet
- Macuilli Mexihcateteouch - Five Aztec Gods (2005), for string quartet
- Haring at the Exhibition (2005), ambient piece
- Fantasy Suite (2007), for flute, violoncello and piano
- Freedom Variations (2008), for trumpet and chamber ensemble
- Tourists and Oracles (2008), for eleven instruments and piano four-hands
- Three Simple Songs (2009), for flute, clarinet, violin, violoncello, and piano
- Venice 1976 (A Parody) (2013), for flute, clarinet, violin, violoncello, and piano
- Country Life (2015) for saxophone and piano
- A Night in Nashville (2015), for saxophone and piano
- Sonata for clarinet and piano (2016)
- Night Waves (2022), for quartet
- Calm and Rough Seas (2025), for trumpet and piano
- Sonata for cello and piano (2026)

Piano music

- Aivlys (1977)
- My Rag (1982)
- My Blues (1982)
- My Rock (1983)
- Rock my Tango (1990)
- Five Easy Pieces (1994)
- Seven Portraits of the Same Person (1996)
- Op.111 - Bagatella su Beethoven (2009)

Organ and harpsichord

- Ellipse II (1975), for harpsichord/clavichord
- A Red Wedding Dress (1998), for organ

=== Choral and vocal music ===
- Fawn (1969/70), for voice and live synthesizer
- Immigrati (1969/70), for voice and live synthesizer
- Ellipse III (1974), for any 4 voices/choruses
- Ghost Tantra (1975), for voice and synthesizer
- Missa brevis (1975), for five voices and two synthesizers
- Le Néant où l'on ne peut arriver (1976), for solo voices, mixed chorus, and orchestra
- Non parto, non resto (1987), for mixed chorus
- Introito, part of the Requiem per le vittime della mafia (1993), for chorus and orchestra
- Night of the Nite (1979), aria from Marilyn for soprano and piano
- Canzoni d'amore (1985), for voice and chamber ensemble
- La fuga di Foscolo (1986), for 4 soloists, speaker, and small orchestra
- Poi andro in America (1986), aria from Salvatore Giuliano for voice and orchestra
- Ninna-nanna (1986), for tenor and piano
- La Conquista (2006), symphonic-choral suite
- Canti polacchi (2010), for female chorus and orchestra
- Senza parole (2012), for mixed chorus
- Missa Brevis Gentilium (2025), for soprano, tenor, choir and orchestra

=== Incidental and theatre music ===
- Nebbia di latte (1987), for flutes and live electronics
- La cena delle beffe (1988), stage music for Carmelo Bene
- Maschere (1993), for Le Massere by Carlo Goldoni for string quartet
- Lontano dagli occhi (1999), for one actor, 4 voices, and piano quartet
- Mozart a Recanati (2006), for one actress, 1 voice, string trio, clarinet, and piano

=== Film score ===
- Anemia

=== Books and book contributions ===
- Ferrero, Lorenzo (2007). Manuale di scrittura musicale. Torino: EDT Srl.
- Ferrero, Lorenzo, ed. (2008). Lo studio dell'orchestrazione. Torino: EDT Srl.
- Capellini, Lorenzo (1987). Nascita di un'opera: Salvatore Giuliano. Bologna: Nuova Alfa Editoriale.
- Ostali, Piero, ed. (1990). Il Piccolo Marat: Storia e rivoluzione nel melodramma verista. Atti del terzo convegno di studi su Pietro Mascagni. Milan: Casa Musicale Sonzogno.
- Harpner, S, ed. (1992). Über Musiktheater: Eine Festschrift. Munich: Ricordi.
- Jacoviello, Marco (1998). Il suono e l'anima: Il paesaggio invisibile del melodramma. Udine: Campanotto.
- Jacoviello, Marco (2015). Al favor della notte... Notturni nel teatro di Mozart. Perugia: Morlacchi Editore.
- Pozzi, S, ed. (2002). La musica sacra nelle chiese cristiane. Bologna: Alfastudio.
- Donati, P, and Pacetti, E, eds. (2002). C'erano una volta nove oscillatori... Lo studio di fonologia della Rai di Milano nello sviluppo della nuova musica in Italia. Teche. Rome: RAI Teche; Milano: Scuole civiche di Milano, Fondazione di partecipazione, Accademia internazionale della musica, Istituto di ricerca musicale; Rome: RAI-ERI.
- Maurizi, P, ed. (2004). Quattordici interviste sul «nuovo teatro musicale» in Italia. Perugia: Morlacchi Editore.
- Hugony, Fabrizio (2010). Galileo e il segreto dei Maya. Milan: NR.

No music book has ever succeeded in miraculously replacing the listening experience. ~ Lorenzo Ferrero

== Discography ==
Year	Title	Genre	Label
1991	Lorenzo Ferrero – Concerto per pianoforte e orchestra, Parodia, Ostinato, Canzoni d'amore	Classical	Nuova Era
1992	Lorenzo Ferrero – Mare nostro	Classical	Ricordi
1998	Lorenzo Ferrero – Different Views: La ruta de Cortés, La noche triste, Championship Suite, Palm Beach Overture	Classical	BMG Ricordi
1999	Lorenzo Ferrero – Capriccio per pianoforte e archi, Concerto per violino, violoncello, pianoforte e orchestra, Concerto per pianoforte e orchestra	Classical	BMG Ricordi
2000	Lorenzo Ferrero – La Nueva España	Classical	Naxos
2013	Lorenzo Ferrero – Tempi di quartetto	Classical	Klanglogo
2020	Lorenzo Ferrero – A Life in Waves: Four Modern Dances, Intermezzo Notturno, Parodia, Paesaggio con Figura, My Blues	Classical	Klanglogo
2021	Lorenzo Ferrero – Baroque Revisited: Rastrelli in Saint Petersburg, Tree Baroque Buildings, Guarini, the Master, Two Cathedrals in the South	Classical	Klanglogo

Year	Title	Genre	Label
1972	Musica Elettronica – Computer Music: Immigrati, Fawn	Electronic	Compagnia Editoriale Pianeta
1972	Les Saisons: Primavera che non vi rincresca	Electronic	IMEB
1976	Steirischer Herbst – Ferrero-Neuwirth-Rühm: Le Néant où l'on ne peut arriver	Classical	ORF
1983	Marco Fumo – Piano in Rag: My Rag	Classical	Fonit Cetra
1983	Fantasia su Roberto Fabbriciani: Ellipse	Classical	Philips
1987	Steirischer Herbst – Musikprotokoll 1987: Ostinato	Classical	ORF
1991	Davide Ficco – Autori Italiani Contemporanei: Onde	Classical	Oliphant
1994	Flavio Cucchi – Italian Guitar Music: Onde	Classical	Arc Music
1995	Dominique Visse – Songs for Seven Centuries: Mi palpita il cuore (part of the song cycle Canzoni d'amore)	Classical	King Records
2002	Sentieri Selvaggi – Bad Blood: Glamorama Spies	Classical	Sensible Records
2003	Saxophone Colours – Italian & French music for saxophone and piano: My Blues	Classical	Stradivarius
2004	L'arte del funambolo – new Italian music for saxophone & piano: My Blues	Classical	Stradivarius
2006	Sentieri Selvaggi – AC/DC: Glamorama Spies	Classical	Cantaloupe Music
2009	Ex Novo Ensemble – Ex Novo Ensemble: Three Simple Songs	Classical	Stradivarius
2011	Duo Alterno – La voce contemporanea in Italia: Canzoni d'amore	Classical	Stradivarius
2012	Alberto Mesirca – ALBORADA Musica di autori italiani contemporanei: Onde	Classical	dotGuitar.It
2017	Mimmo Malandra – NOVOSAX Great Composers for Mimmo: Country Life	Classical	Sterling Records

Year	Title	Genre	Label
1982	Zeitgenössische Musik in der Bundesrepublik Deutschland, 1970-80: Glas-Spiele (as performer)	Electronic	Harmonia mundi
1986	Josef Anton Riedl – Klangfelder: Klangsynchronie II, Reaktion auf Komposition für Elektronische Klänge Nr. 2, Epiphyt II (as performer)	Electronic	Loft
2009	Josef Anton Riedl – Klangregionen 1951-2007: Mix Fontana Mix, Klangsynchronie I (as performer)	Electronic	Edition RZ
2010	Josef Anton Riedl – vielleicht-perhaps-peut-être: Glas-Spiele (as performer)	Electronic	Neos

Year	Title	Genre	Label
1995	Christmas in Vienna III: "Hark! The Herald Angels Sing", "Noël d'autrefois", "When A Child is Born", "Carol of the Bells", "The Twelve Days of Christmas", "Kumbaya", and "A Very Private Christmas" - arrangements by Lorenzo Ferrero	Christmas carols	Sony Classical
1997	A Tenors Christmas: "A Very Private Christmas" - arrangement by Lorenzo Ferrero	Christmas carols	Sony Classical
1997	Plácido Domingo – The Domingo Collection: "The Student Prince: I'll walk with God" - arrangement by Lorenzo Ferrero	Christmas carols	Sony Classical
1998	The Best of Christmas in Vienna: "Noël d'autrefois", "When a Child is Born", "Carol of the Bells", "The Twelve Days of Christmas", "Kumbaya, My Lord" - arrangements by Lorenzo Ferrero	Christmas carols	Sony Classical
1998	I'll be Home for Christmas: "Hark! The Herald Angels Sing", "A Very Private Christmas", "The Twelve Days of Christmas", "Kumbaya, My Lord" - arrangements by Lorenzo Ferrero	Christmas carols	Sony Classical
2000	Christmas All Over The World: "Hark! The Herald Angels Sing" - arrangement by Lorenzo Ferrero	Christmas carols	Sony Classical
2006	Weihnachtszeit mit Holger Wemhoff: "Hark! The Herald Angels Sing", "When a Child is Born" - arrangements by Lorenzo Ferrero	Christmas carols	

== See also ==
- Italian opera
- List of historical opera characters
- Classical music written in collaboration
- DSCH motif
- Spanish conquest of the Aztec Empire
- Music of Italy
- Glamorama
- 1985 in music

== Sources ==
- Cresti, Renzo (2019). Musica presente. Tendenze e compositori di oggi, pp. 33–39. Lucca: Libreria Musicale Italiana. ISBN 978-88-5543-001-2
- Holden, Amanda, ed. (2001). The New Penguin Opera Guide. London: Penguin Books. ISBN 0-14-051475-9
- Sadie, Stanley, ed. (1992–2002). The New Grove Dictionary of Opera. London: Macmillan Publishers. ISBN 0-19-522186-9
- Vitelli, Niclo (2016). Un bel dì vedremo: Il festival di Giacomo Puccini. Cronaca di un'incompiuta. Florence: Firenze Leonardo Edizioni. ISBN 978-88-6800-040-0
