= List of historical opera characters =

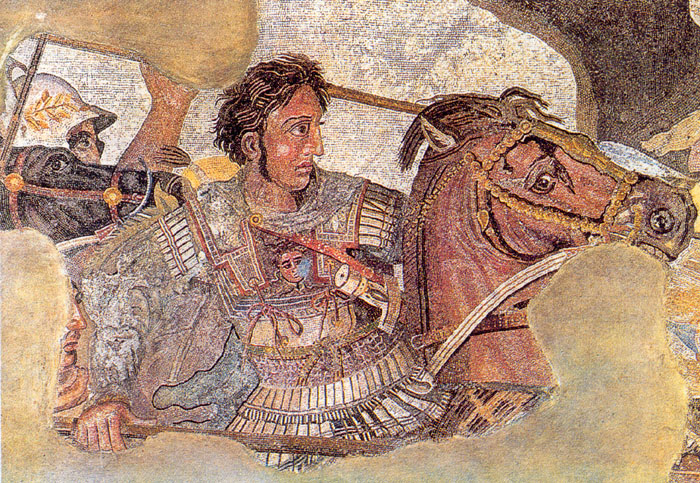
Alexander the Great who appears as a character in over seventy operas, including two by George Frideric Handel

This is a list of historical figures who have been characters in opera or operetta.

Historical accuracy in such works has often been subject to the imperatives of dramatic presentation. Consequently, in many cases:

- historical characters appear alongside fictional characters
- historical characters who never met, or whose lives did not even overlap, appear on stage together
- historical events depicted are transported to earlier or later times or to different places
- historical people are seen participating in entirely fictional events, or vice versa
- the actions of historical people are attributed to other persons

For the purposes of this list, Biblical characters are generally taken to be fictional, unless there is clear evidence of their historicity.

Operas appear in bold when the historical figure is also the title role.

Where a character appears in more than opera, the entries are sorted by composer.

== List of historical figures ==
=== A ===
Abdisho IV Maron, Patriarch of the Chaldean Catholic Church

- Hans Pfitzner: Palestrina (as Abdisu)

Peter Abelard, French priest, scholar, theologian

- Peter Tahourdin: **Héloise and Abelard**
- Charles Wilson: **Héloise and Abelard**

John Quincy Adams, American President

- Anthony Davis, Amistad
- Virgil Thomson: The Mother of Us All

Adelaide of Aquitaine, queen consort of France by marriage to Hugh Capet

- Gaetano Donizetti: Ugo, conte di Parigi

Gabriele Adorno, fifth Doge of Genoa

- Giuseppe Verdi: Simon Boccanegra

Flavius Aetius, Roman general

- Giuseppe Gazzaniga: **Ezio**
- George Frideric Handel: **Ezio**
- Gaetano Latilla: **Ezio**
- Giuseppe Verdi: Attila

Heinrich Cornelius Agrippa, German alchemist, writer

- Sergei Prokofiev: The Fiery Angel (as Agrippa of Nettesheim)

Marcus Vipsanius Agrippa, Roman statesman and general

- Samuel Barber: Antony and Cleopatra

Gnaeus Domitius Ahenobarbus, Roman consul (32 BC)

- Samuel Barber: Antony and Cleopatra (as Enobarbus)

Pharaoh Akhenaten of Egypt

- Philip Glass: **Akhnaten**

3rd Duke of Alba, Governor of the Spanish Netherlands

- Gaetano Donizetti, completed by Matteo Salvi: **Le duc d'Albe**
- Ernst Krenek: Karl V

Albert of Mainz, Elector and Archbishop of Mainz

- Paul Hindemith: Mathis der Maler (as Albrecht von Brandenburg)

Buzz Aldrin, American astronaut

- Jonathan Dove: **Man on the Moon**

Alexander the Great, King of Macedon

- Girolamo Abos: **Alessandro nelle Indie**
- George Frideric Handel: **Alessandro**
- George Frideric Handel: Poro
- José de Nebra: No todo indicio es verdad y Alexandro en Asia
- Giovanni Pacini: **Alessandro nelle Indie**

(He appears in about 70 other operas set to the same text by Metastasio as used by Pacini, including one by Leonardo Vinci.)

Emperor Alexander Severus of Rome

- George Frideric Handel: **Alessandro Severo**

Tsar Alexander I of Russia

- Sergei Prokofiev: War and Peace (silent role)

Brigadier General Edward Porter Alexander, American military commander

- Philip Glass: Appomattox

Tsarina Alexandra of Russia, consort of Tsar Nicholas II

- Deborah Drattell: Nicholas and **Alexandra**

Tsarevich Alexei Petrovich of Russia, son of Peter the Great

- Franz Lehár: **Der Zarewitsch**

Saint Alexius of Rome

- Stefano Landi: **Il Sant'Alessio** (1631; the first opera written on an historical subject)

Alfonso I d'Este, Duke of Ferrara, husband of Lucrezia Borgia

- Gaetano Donizetti: Lucrezia Borgia

Alfonso II d'Este, Duke of Ferrara

- Gaetano Donizetti: Torquato Tasso

King Alfonso XI of Castile

- Gaetano Donizetti: La favorite

King Alfred the Great, legendary Anglo-Saxon king

- Thomas Arne: **Alfred**
- Gaetano Donizetti: **Alfredo il grande**
- Antonín Dvořák: **Alfred**
- Friedrich von Flotow: **Alfred der Große**

Dante Alighieri: see Dante

Almanzor (Al-Mansur Ibn Abi Aamir), de facto ruler of al-Andalus

- Giacomo Meyerbeer: L'esule di Granata (as Almanzor)

Pedro de Alvarado, Spanish conquistador

- Lorenzo Ferrero: La Conquista
- Roger Sessions: Montezuma

Amalasuntha, Queen of the Ostrogoths

- André Messager: Isoline (as La Reine Amalasonthe)

Anacreon, Greek lyric poet

- Luigi Cherubini: **Anacréon**
- Jean-Philippe Rameau: **Anacréon** (1754 version)
- Jean-Philippe Rameau: **Anacréon** (1757 version)

Jacob Johan Anckarström, Swedish military officer, assassin of Gustav III

- Daniel Auber: Gustave III
- Giuseppe Verdi: Un ballo in maschera

Tommaso Aniello: see Masaniello

Anne of Bavaria, Holy Roman Empress, Queen of Rome and Bavaria

- Ignaz Holzbauer: Günther von Schwarzburg

Queen Anne of Great Britain

- Friedrich von Flotow: Martha (silent role)

Queen Anne (Boleyn), second consort of Henry VIII of England

- Gaetano Donizetti: **Anna Bolena**
- Camille Saint-Saëns: Henry VIII

Queen Anne (Neville), consort of Richard III of England

- Giorgio Battistelli, Richard III (2004)

Saint Anthony the Great

- Bernice Johnson Reagon: **The Temptation of Saint Anthony**

Susan B. Anthony, American women's rights activist

- Virgil Thomson: **The Mother of Us All**

Antiochus I Soter, King of the Seleucid Empire

- Étienne Méhul: Stratonice
- Jean-Philippe Rameau: Les fêtes de Polymnie

Rodrigo Ponce de León, 4th Duke of Arcos, Spanish grandee, Viceroy of Naples

- Antônio Carlos Gomes: Salvator Rosa

Alice Arden, English murderer, and her husband/victim:
Thomas Arden, English Mayor

- Alexander Goehr: **Arden Must Die**

Margaret Campbell, Duchess of Argyll, British socialite and sexual celebrity

- Thomas Adès: Powder Her Face

Gustaf Mauritz Armfelt, Finnish-Swedish diplomat, possible lover of Gustav III of Sweden

- Daniel Auber: Gustave III

Arminius, Germanic chieftain

- George Frideric Handel: **Arminio**

Edwin H. Armstrong, American radio pioneer, inventor of FM radio transmission

- Evan Hause: The Birth and Theft of Television

Artabanus of Persia, political figure

- Thomas Arne: Artaxerxes

King Artaxerxes I of Persia

- Girolamo Abos: **Artaserse**
- Thomas Arne: **Artaxerxes**
- Antonio Sacchini: **Artaserse**

(He appears in over 40 other operas set to the same text from Metastasio's libretto Artaserse)

King Arthur, legendary king of Britain

- Isaac Albéniz: Merlin
- Grażyna Bacewicz: **The Adventure of King Arthur**
- Ernest Chausson: **Le roi Arthus**
- Henry Purcell: **King Arthur**
- Amadeu Vives i Roig: **Artús**
- Max Vogrich: **King Arthur**

Chester A. Arthur, American President

- Douglas Moore: The Ballad of Baby Doe

Ulrica Arfvidsson, Swedish fortune-teller

- Daniel Auber: Gustave III
- Giuseppe Verdi: Un ballo in maschera

Emanuele d'Astorga, Italian composer

- Johann Joseph Abert: **Astorga**

Atahualpa, Inca sovereign emperor

- Iain Hamilton: The Royal Hunt of the Sun

Attila the Hun

- Giuseppe Verdi: **Attila**

Atys, son of King Croesus of Lydia

- Reinhard Keiser: Croesus

Caesar Augustus, Roman Emperor

- Samuel Barber: Antony and Cleopatra (as Octavius Caesar)

Aurelian, Emperor of Rome

- Gioachino Rossini: **Aureliano in Palmira**

Pharaoh Ay of Egypt

- Philip Glass: Akhnaten

=== B ===
Francis Bacon, Irish painter

- Stephen Crowe: **The Francis Bacon Opera**

Cardinal Maffeo Barberini: see Pope Urban VIII

Michael Andreas Barclay de Tolly, Russian prince and general

- Sergei Prokofiev: War and Peace

Brigitte Bardot, French actress

- Igor Wakhévitch: Être Dieu: opéra-poème, audiovisuel et cathare en six parties (a creation of Salvador Dalí; the performer plays Bardot impersonating an artichoke)

Pyotr Fyodorovich Basmanov, Russian boyar

- Antonín Dvořák: Dimitrij

Daisy Bates, Irish-Australian indigenous welfare worker and anthropologist

- Margaret Sutherland: **The Young Kabbarli**

Bayezid I "The Thunderbolt", Ottoman Sultan

- George Frideric Handel: Tamerlano (as Bajazet)
- Antonio Vivaldi: **Bajazet**

Pierre Beaumarchais, French playwright

- John Corigliano: The Ghosts of Versailles

Saint Thomas Becket, Archbishop of Canterbury

- Ildebrando Pizzetti: Assassinio nella cattedrale

Belisarius, Byzantine general

- Gaetano Donizetti: **Belisario**

Augustin Daniel Belliard, French general

- Sergei Prokofiev: War and Peace

Belshazzar, Prince of Babylon

- Gioachino Rossini: Ciro in Babilonia (as Baldassare, King of Assyria)

Olga Benário Prestes, German-Brazilian communist militant

- Jorge Antunes: **Olga**

Levin August, Count von Bennigsen, German general

- Sergei Prokofiev: War and Peace

Queen Berenice III of Egypt

- George Frideric Handel: **Berenice**

Boris Berezovsky, Russian business oligarch

- Anthony Bolton: The Life and Death of Alexander Litvinenko

Louis-Alexandre Berthier, Marshal of France

- Sergei Prokofiev: War and Peace

Joe Biden, 46th President of the United States

- Curtis K. Hughes: Say It Ain't So, Joe

Otto von Bismarck, first Chancellor of Germany

- Luigi Nono: Al gran sole carico d'amore

Harman Blennerhassett, Irish-American lawyer

- Walter Damrosch: The Man Without a Country

Blondel de Nesle, French troubador

- André Grétry: Richard Coeur-de-lion

Boabdil: see Muhammad XI of Granada

Francisco de Bobadilla, Spanish colonial administrator

- Alberto Franchetti: Cristoforo Colombo

Giovanni Boccaccio, Italian writer, poet

- Franz von Suppé: **Boccaccio**

Simone Boccanegra, first Doge of Genoa

- Giuseppe Verdi: **Simon Boccanegra**

George Boleyn, 2nd Viscount Rochford, brother of Anne Boleyn

- Gaetano Donizetti: Anna Bolena (as Rochefort)

Simón Bolívar, South American revolutionary

- Darius Milhaud: **Bolivar**
- Thea Musgrave: **Simón Bolívar**

Caroline Bonaparte, Queen Consort of Naples and Sicily, sister of Napoleon
Pauline Bonaparte, Princess of France, sister of Napoleon

- Ivan Caryll: The Duchess of Dantzic

John Wilkes Booth, American presidential assassin

- Eric W. Sawyer: Our American Cousin

Lizzie Borden, American celebrity and possible axe-murderer

- Thomas Albert: **Lizbeth**
- Jack Beeson: **Lizzie Borden**

Jorge Luis Borges, Argentinian writer

- Juan María Solare: Veinticinco de agosto, 1983 (2 roles, Old Borges, baritone; and Young Borges, tenor)

Saint Francis Borgia, 4th Duke of Gandía, Spanish Superior-General of the Jesuits

- Ernst Krenek: Karl V

Lucrezia Borgia, daughter of Pope Alexander VI

- Gaetano Donizetti: **Lucrezia Borgia**

Saint Charles Borromeo, Italian cardinal

- Hans Pfitzner: Palestrina

Đurađ Branković, Serbian despot

- Ferenc Erkel: **György Brankovics**

Prince Braslav, Duke of Lower Pannonia

- Eugen Suchoň: Svätopluk

Ed Broadbent, Canadian politician

- Alexina Louie: Mulroney: The Opera

Gian Francesco Brogni, Italian cardinal

- Fromental Halévy: La Juive

John Hobhouse, 1st Baron Broughton, British memoirist and politician

- Virgil Thomson: Lord Byron

John Brown, Sergeant of the Second Battalion, Boston Light Infantry Volunteer Militia

- Walter Schumann: **John Brown's Body**

Pieter Bruegel the Elder, Flemish painter

- Jean Absil: **Pierre Breughel l'Ancien**

Antonín Brus of Mohelnice, Archbishop of Prague

- Hans Pfitzner: Palestrina (as Anton Brus von Müglitz)

Marcus Junius Brutus the Younger, Roman politician, co-assassin of Julius Caesar

- Giselher Klebe: Die Ermordung Cäsars

William Jennings Bryan, American Secretary of State, presidential candidate

- Douglas Moore: The Ballad of Baby Doe

Henry Stafford, 2nd Duke of Buckingham (1st creation)

- Giorgio Battistelli, Richard III (2004)

George Villiers, 2nd Duke of Buckingham (2nd creation), English poet, statesman

- Robert Planquette: Nell Gwynne

The Buddha (Siddharta Gautama)

- Max Vogrich: **Buddha**

Johannes Bureus, Swedish scholar

- Wilhelm Peterson-Berger: The Doomsday Prophets (as Johan Bure)

William Cecil, 1st Baron Burghley, English statesman, adviser to Elizabeth I

- Gaetano Donizetti: Maria Stuarda (as Lord Guglielmo Cecil)

Aaron Burr, third Vice President of the United States

- Walter Damrosch: The Man Without a Country

Anne Isabella Byron, Baroness Byron, wife of Lord Byron

- Virgil Thomson: Lord Byron

Lord Byron, English poet

- Agustí Charles: **Lord Byron: un estiu sense estiu** (Lord Byron: a summer without summer)
- Virgil Thomson: **Lord Byron**

=== C ===
Cacamatzin, Aztec king

- Roger Sessions: Montezuma

Alessandro Cagliostro (Giuseppe Balsamo), Italian adventurer and imposter

- Johann Strauss II: **Cagliostro in Wien**
- Mikael Tariverdiev: **Graf Cagliostro**

Maria Callas, American-Greek opera singer

- Michael Daugherty: Jackie O

Luís de Camões, Portuguese poet

- Gaetano Donizetti: Dom Sébastien

Kim Campbell, Prime Minister of Canada

- Alexina Louie: Mulroney: The Opera

Margaret Campbell, Duchess of Argyll, British socialite

- Thomas Adès: Powder Her Face

Lorenzo Campeggio, Cardinal Protector of England

- Camille Saint-Saëns: Henry VIII

Canek, Aztec High Priest

- Henry Kimball Hadley: Azora, the Daughter of Montezuma

Wolfgang Capito, German religious reformer

- Paul Hindemith: Mathis der Maler

Gerolamo Cardano, Italian mathematician and physician

- Mary Finsterer: Biographica (2017)

Carlos, Prince of Asturias, son of Philip II of Spain

- Giuseppe Verdi: **Don Carlos**

Julian Carlton, American murderer of Mamah Cheney, mistress of Frank Lloyd Wright

- Daron Hagen: Shining Brow

Enrico Caruso, Italian tenor

- Edwin Penhorwood: Too Many Sopranos (spoofed as "Enrico Carouser")

Giacomo Casanova, Italian adventurer and libertine

- Dominick Argento: **Casanova's Homecoming**
- Albert Lortzing: **Casanova**

Servilius Casca, co-assassin of Julius Caesar
Gaius Cassius Longinus, Roman politician, co-assassin of Julius Caesar

- Giselher Klebe: Die Ermordung Cäsars

Fidel Castro, Cuban leader

- Luigi Nono: Al gran sole carico d'amore

Inês de Castro, lover and lawful wife of King Peter I of Portugal

- Vicent Lleó i Balbastre: **Inés de Castro**
- James MacMillan: **Ines de Castro**
- Thomas Pasatieri: **Ines de Castro**
- Giuseppe Persiani: **Ines de Castro**
- Niccolò Antonio Zingarelli: **Ines de Castro**

Sir William Catesby

- Giorgio Battistelli, Richard III (2004)

Empress Catherine I of Russia

- Gaetano Donizetti: Il falegname di Livonia, o Pietro il grande, czar delle Russie
- André Grétry: Pierre le Grand

Empress Catherine II "The Great" of Russia

- César Cui: The Captain's Daughter
- Igor Wakhévitch: Être Dieu: opéra-poème, audiovisuel et cathare en six parties (a creation of Salvador Dalí; Catherine does a striptease with Marilyn Monroe)

Queen Catherine (of Aragon), first wife of Henry VIII of England

- Camille Saint-Saëns: Henry VIII

Queen Catherine (Parr), sixth and last wife of Henry VIII

- Anthony Collins: **Catherine Parr**

Pierre Cauchon, French bishop

- Norman Dello Joio: The Triumph of St. Joan

Armand Augustin Louis de Caulaincourt, French general

- Sergei Prokofiev: War and Peace (silent role)

Guido Cavalcanti, Florentine poet

- Ezra Pound and George Antheil: **Cavalcanti**

Arthur Cecil, English actor, theatre manager

- Thomas German Reed (with W. S. Gilbert): Our Island Home

Cecily Neville, Duchess of York

- Giorgio Battistelli, Richard III (2004)

Benvenuto Cellini, Italian sculptor, goldsmith, artisan

- Hector Berlioz: **Benvenuto Cellini**
- Camille Saint-Saëns: Ascanio

Beatrice Cenci, Italian noblewoman, protagonist of a famous murder trial

- Havergal Brian: The Cenci (1951–52)
- Alberto Ginastera: **Beatrix Cenci**
- Berthold Goldschmidt: **Beatrice Cenci**
- Alessandro Londei e Brunella Caronti: **Beatrice Cenci** (2006)
- James Rolfe: **Beatrice Chancy**

Miguel de Cervantes, Spanish writer

- Rafael Aceves y Lozano: **El manco de Lepanto**
- Jacinto Guerrero: El huésped del sevillano, zarzuela (Cervantes appears as "el huésped")

Lindy Chamberlain and Michael Chamberlain, Australian parents wrongly convicted of the murder of their daughter Azaria

- Moya Henderson: **Lindy**

Charles Chaplin, British actor

- Salvador Bacarisse: **Charlot**

Charlemagne, King of the Franks

- Vincenzo Manfredini: **Carlo Magno**
- Franz Schubert: Fierrabras
- Carl Maria von Weber: Oberon

King Charles II of England

- Sir George Alexander Macfarren: **King Charles II**
- Robert Planquette: Nell Gwynne

King Charles II of Spain

- Jules Massenet: Don César de Bazan
- William Vincent Wallace: Maritana

Charles IV, Holy Roman Emperor

- Ignaz Holzbauer: Günther von Schwarzburg (as Karl, King of Bohemia)

Charles V, Holy Roman Emperor

- Ernst Krenek: **Karl V**
- Camille Saint-Saëns: Ascanio
- Giuseppe Verdi: Ernani
- Giuseppe Verdi: Don Carlos

King Charles VI of France

- Fromental Halévy: **Charles VI**

King Charles VII of France

- Walter Braunfels: Szenen aus dem Leben der Heiligen Johanna
- César Cui: The Saracen
- Norman Dello Joio: The Triumph of St. Joan
- Fromental Halévy: Charles VI
- Pyotr Ilyich Tchaikovsky: The Maid of Orleans
- Giuseppe Verdi: Giovanna d'Arco (as Carlo VII)

King Charles XI of Sweden

- Fredrik Pacius: **Kung Karls jakt**

Charles the Bold, Duke of Burgundy

- Giovanni Pacini: **Carlo di Borgogna**

Charles Martel, Duke and Prince of the Franks

- Jacques Offenbach: Geneviève de Brabant

Charmian, servant to Cleopatra

- Samuel Barber: Antony and Cleopatra
- Jules Massenet: Cléopâtre

Thomas Chatterton, English poet and forger

- Ruggero Leoncavallo: **Chatterton**
- Matthias Pintscher: **Thomas Chatterton**
- Gerard Victory: **Chatterton**

Geoffrey Chaucer, English author, poet, philosopher, courtier and diplomat

- Reginald De Koven: The Canterbury Pilgrims

Danny Chen, American army private who committed suicide in Afghanistan

- Huang Ruo: An American Soldier

Edwin Cheney, American electrical engineer
Mamah Cheney, wife of Edwin Cheney, murdered mistress of Frank Lloyd Wright

- Daron Hagen: Shining Brow

André Chénier, French journalist

- Umberto Giordano: **Andrea Chénier**

Sir Richard Cholmondeley, Lieutenant of the Tower of London

- Gilbert and Sullivan: The Yeomen of the Guard

Frédéric Chopin, Polish-French composer

- Giacomo Orefice: **Chopin** (very loosely based on his life; all the other characters are fictional)

Chou En-lai: see Zhou Enlai

Jean Chrétien, Canadian Prime Minister

- Alexina Louie: Mulroney: The Opera

Christina, Queen of Sweden

- Jacopo Foroni: **Cristina, regina di Svezia**
- Wilhelm Peterson-Berger: The Doomsday Prophets

Saint Christopher, revered but legendary saint

- Vincent d'Indy: **La légende de Saint-Christophe**

Tillius Cimber, co-assassin of Julius Caesar

- Giselher Klebe: Die Ermordung Cäsars (as Metellus Cimber)

Helvius Cinna, Roman poet

- Lorenzo Ferrero: Le piccole storie: Ai margini delle guerre
- Giselher Klebe: Die Ermordung Cäsars

Lucius Cornelius Cinna, Roman consul

- Wolfgang Amadeus Mozart: Lucio Silla

Henri Coiffier de Ruzé, Marquis of Cinq-Mars, French royal favourite of Louis XIII

- Charles Gounod: **Cinq-Mars**

George Plantagenet, 1st Duke of Clarence

- Giorgio Battistelli, Richard III (2004)

Emperor Claudius of Rome

- George Frideric Handel: Agrippina

Cleitus the Black, Macedonian soldier

- George Frideric Handel: Alessandro, (as Clito)

Pope Clement VII

- Hector Berlioz: Benvenuto Cellini
- Ernst Krenek: Karl V

Cleopatra VII, Pharaoh of Egypt

- John Adams: Antony and **Cleopatra**
- Samuel Barber: Antony and **Cleopatra**
- Domenico Cimarosa: **La Cleopatra**
- August Enna: **Kleopatra**
- Carl Heinrich Graun: Cesare e **Cleopatra**
- Louis Gruenberg: Antony and **Cleopatra**
- Henry Kimball Hadley: **Cleopatra's Night**
- George Frideric Handel: Giulio Cesare (in Egitto)
- Jules Massenet: **Cléopâtre**
- Felip Pedrell: **Cléopâtre**
- Lauro Rossi: **Cleopatra**

Henry Clifford, 10th Baron de Clifford, English military commander

- Isaac Albéniz: **Henry Clifford**

Bill Clinton, 42nd US President

- Bonnie Montgomery: **Billy Blythe**

Hillary Clinton, American First Lady, Senator, Secretary of State

- Curtis K. Hughes: Say It Ain't So, Joe

Olivier de Clisson, Breton soldier

- Fromental Halévy: Charles VI

Cloelia, early Roman figure, possibly legendary

- Filippo Amadei, Giovanni Bononcini and George Frideric Handel: Muzio Scevola

Robert Coates, Canadian politician

- Alexina Louie: Mulroney: The Opera

Howell Cobb, American political figure

- Philip Glass: Appomattox

Walter Cocking, dean at the University of Georgia, the focus of the "Cocking affair"

- Michael Braz: **A Scholar Under Siege**

Horatius Cocles, Roman military officer

- Filippo Amadei, Giovanni Bononcini and George Frideric Handel: Muzio Scevola

Lucius Tarquinius Collatinus, Roman consul, husband of Lucretia

- Benjamin Britten: The Rape of Lucretia

Stefano Colonna (1265–1348), Roman political figure

- Richard Wagner: Rienzi

Christopher Columbus, Genoese explorer of the New World

- Leonardo Balada: **Cristóbal Colón**
- Leonardo Balada: **Death of Columbus**
- Ramon Carnicer: **Cristoforo Colombo**
- Werner Egk: **Columbus**
- Manuel de Falla: Atlántida
- Alberto Franchetti: **Cristoforo Colombo**
- Philip Glass: The Voyage
- Darius Milhaud: **Christophe Colomb**

Anthony Comstock, American morals campaigner

- Virgil Thomson: The Mother of Us All

Emperor Constantine the Great of Rome

- Gaetano Donizetti: Fausta

John Connally, Governor of Texas

- David T. Little: JFK

Nicolaus Copernicus, Polish scientist

- Claude Vivier: **Kopernikus**

Charlotte Corday, French Girondin revolutionary

- Lorenzo Ferrero: **Charlotte Corday**

Saint Corentin of Quimper, Breton patron saint of seafood

- Édouard Lalo: Le roi d'Ys

Gaius Marcius Coriolanus, legendary Roman leader

- Francesco Cavalli: **Coriolano**

Catherine Cornaro, consort of James II of Cyprus

- Gaetano Donizetti: **Caterina Cornaro**
- Fromental Halévy: **La reine de Chypre**
- Franz Lachner: **Caterina Cornaro**

Giorgio Cornaro, Italian nobleman, father of Catherine Cornaro

- Gaetano Donizetti: Caterina Cornaro (as Andrea Cornaro)

Jeronimus Cornelisz, Dutch apothecary and merchant

- Richard Mills: Batavia

Hernán Cortés, Spanish conquistador

- Ruperto Chapí: Las naves de Cortés
- Lorenzo Ferrero: La Conquista
- Carl Heinrich Graun: Montezuma
- Henry Kimball Hadley: Azora, the Daughter of Montezuma
- Aniceto Ortega: Guatimotzin
- Wolfgang Rihm: **Die Eroberung von Mexico**
- Roger Sessions: Montezuma
- Gaspare Spontini: **Fernand Cortez**
- Antonio Vivaldi: Motezuma (as Fernando)

Thomas Cranmer, Archbishop of Canterbury

- Sir Peter Maxwell Davies: Taverner (not identified as such)
- Camille Saint-Saëns: Henry VIII

Marcus Licinius Crassus, Roman general and politician

- Francesco Cavalli: Pompeo Magno

Flavius Julius Crispus, Caesar of the Roman Empire

- Gaetano Donizetti: Fausta

Croesus, King of Lydia

- Reinhard Keiser: **Croesus**

Oliver Cromwell, English Puritan leader

- Salvatore Agnelli: **Cromwell**

Cuauhtémoc, Aztec king

- Aniceto Ortega: **Guatimotzin**
- Roger Sessions: Montezuma

Sir Henry Cuffe, English politician

- Benjamin Britten: Gloriana

Cyrano de Bergerac, French dramatist and duellist

- Franco Alfano: **Cyrano de Bergerac**
- Walter Damrosch: **Cyrano**
- David DiChiera, orch. Mark Flint: **Cyrano**
- Eino Tamberg: **Cyrano de Bergerac**

Cyrus the Great, King of Persia

- Maria Teresa Agnesi Pinottini: **Ciro in Armenia**
- Francesco Cavalli: **Ciro**
- Reinhard Keiser: Croesus
- Gioachino Rossini: **Ciro in Babilonia**

=== D ===
Salvador Dalí, Spanish painter

- Xavier Benguerel: **Jo, Dalí** (I, Dalí)
- Igor Wakhévitch: **Être Dieu: opéra-poème, audiovisuel et cathare en six parties** (Dalí's creation; his character is in turn playing God)

Dalibor of Kozojed, Czech knight

- Bedřich Smetana: **Dalibor**

Dante Alighieri, Italian poet

- Tan Dun: Marco Polo
- Sergei Rachmaninoff: Francesca da Rimini
- Ambroise Thomas: Françoise de Rimini
- Giacomo Puccini: Gianni Schicchi

Georges Danton, French revolutionary figure

- John Eaton: **Danton** and Robespierre
- Gottfried von Einem: **Dantons Tod**

Jacques d'Arc, French farmer, father of Joan of Arc

- Giuseppe Verdi: Giovanna d'Arco (as Giacomo)

King Darius III of Persia

- Francesco Cavalli: Statira principessa di Persia

Sir William Davenant, English poet and playwright

- Gaspare Spontini: Milton

Louis-Nicolas Davout, Marshal of France

- Sergei Prokofiev: War and Peace

John Dee, British alchemist, astrologer, royal adviser

- Rufus Norris and Damon Albarn: **Dr Dee: An English Opera** (non-singing role)

Gotse Delchev, Macedonian revolutionary figure

- Kiril Makedonski: **Goce**

Marion Delorme, French courtesan

- Charles Gounod: Cinq-Mars

Camille Desmoulins, French revolutionary journalist, politician

- Gottfried von Einem: Dantons Tod

Bernal Díaz del Castillo, Spanish conquistador

- Roger Sessions: Montezuma

Jimena Díaz, wife of El Cid, ruler of Valencia

- Claude Debussy: Rodrigue et **Chimène**
- Giuseppe Farinelli: Il Cid della Spagna (as Climene)
- Jules Massenet: Le Cid (as Chimene)

Rodrigo Díaz de Vivar, "El Cid"

- Johann Caspar Aiblinger: **Rodrigo und Ximene**
- Peter Cornelius: **Der Cid**
- Claude Debussy: **Rodrigue** et Chimène
- Giuseppe Farinelli: **Il Cid della Spagna**
- Jules Massenet: **Le Cid**
- Antonio Sacchini: **Il Cid**

Georgi Dimitrov, Bulgarian Communist leader

- Luigi Nono: Al gran sole carico d'amore

Emperor Diocletian of Rome

- Henry Purcell: **Dioclesian**

Tsar Dmitri Ioannovich of Russia, the so-called "False Dmitriy I"

- Antonín Dvořák: **Dimitrij**
- Victorin de Joncières: **Dimitri**
- Modest Mussorgsky: **Boris Godunov**

Dmitry Donskoy, Prince of Moscow, Grand Prince of Vladimir

- Anton Rubinstein: Dmitry Donskoy

Dobrynya Nikitich, legendary Kievan bogatyr

- Alexander Serov: Rogneda

Publius Cornelius Dolabella, Roman general

- Samuel Barber: Antony and Cleopatra

Saint Dominic, Domingo de Guzman, founder of the Dominicans

- Antonio Braga: **San Domenico di Guzman**

Lord Alfred "Bosie" Douglas, English writer, lover of Oscar Wilde

- Theodore Morrison: Oscar (non-singing role)

James Douglas, Lord of Douglas, Scots soldier, known as the "Black Douglas"

- Gioachino Rossini: Robert Bruce (pastiche)

Frederick Douglass, African-American social reformer, abolitionist, orator, writer, and statesman

- Ulysses Kay: **Frederick Douglass**
- Dorothy Rudd Moore: **Frederick Douglass**

György Dózsa, Hungarian leader of peasant revolt

- Ferenc Erkel: **György Dózsa**

Sir Francis Drake, English adventurer, pirate, politician

- Matthew Locke: **The History of Sir Francis Drake**

John Dryden, English poet

- Virgil Thomson: Lord Byron

King Duncan I of Scotland

- Ernest Bloch: Macbeth
- Giuseppe Verdi: Macbeth

=== E ===
Ana de Mendoza, Princess of Éboli, Spanish aristocrat

- Giuseppe Verdi: Don Carlos

Nelson Eddy, American tenor, actor

- Edwin Penhorwood: Too Many Sopranos (spoofed as "Nelson Deadly")

King Edward II of England

- Gioachino Rossini: Robert Bruce (pastiche)

King Edward III of England

- Gaetano Donizetti: L'assedio di Calais

King Edward IV of England
King Edward V of England (as Prince Edward)

- Giorgio Battistelli, Richard III (2004)

King Edward VI of England

- Priit Pajusaar: The Prince and the Pauper (2013)

Adolf Eichmann, German Nazi SS Head

- Erkki-Sven Tüür: Wallenberg

Albert Einstein, German-American scientist

- Paul Dessau: **Einstein**
- Philip Glass: **Einstein on the Beach**

Emperor Elagabalus of Rome (Marcus Aurelius Antoninus Augustus)

- Pietro Simone Agostini: **Eliogabalo**
- Francesco Cavalli: **Eliogabalo**

Eleanor of Austria, Queen Consort of Portugal and France

- Ernst Krenek: Karl V

Eleanor of Guzman, mistress of King Alfonso XI of Castile and mother of Henry II

- Gaetano Donizetti: **La favorite** (as Leonor de Guzmán)

Elisabeth, Queen of Bohemia

- Ignaz Holzbauer: Günther von Schwarzburg (as Asberta)

Elisabeth Farnese, Queen Consort to Philip V of Spain

- John Barnett: Farinelli

Elisabeth of Valois, daughter of Henry II of France and Catherine de' Medici, wife of Philip II of Spain

- Giuseppe Verdi: Don Carlos

Elisiv of Kiev

- Heorhiy Maiboroda: Yaroslav Mudriy

Queen Elizabeth I of Castile: see Queen Isabella I of Castile

Queen Elizabeth I of England (see also Category:Operas about Elizabeth I)

- Thomas Arne: **Eliza** (she does not appear as a character as such, but the opera is named for her)
- Benjamin Britten: **Gloriana**
- Gaetano Donizetti: Il castello di Kenilworth
- Gaetano Donizetti: Maria Stuarda
- Gaetano Donizetti: Roberto Devereux
- Edward German: Merrie England
- Gioachino Rossini: **Elisabetta, regina d'Inghilterra**

Queen Elizabeth (Woodville), consort of King Edward IV of England

- Giorgio Battistelli, Richard III (2004)

Fanny Elssler, Austrian ballerina

- Arthur Honegger and Jacques Ibert: L'Aiglon

Ninon de l'Enclos, French courtesan

- Charles Gounod: Cinq-Mars

Enzio of Sardinia, king of Sardinia

- Johann Joseph Abert: **König Enzio** and **Enzio von Hohenstaufen** (2nd version)

Louise d'Épinay, French diarist, memoirist

- Reynaldo Hahn: Mozart (musical comedy)

Erasistratus, Greek anatomist, physician

- Étienne Méhul: Stratonice

King Eric V of Denmark

- Peter Arnold Heise: Drot og marsk (**King** and Marshall)

José de Espronceda, Spanish poet

- Federico Moreno Torroba: **El poeta**

Robert Devereux, 2nd Earl of Essex, Elizabethan courtier and royal favourite

- Benjamin Britten: Gloriana
- Gaetano Donizetti: **Roberto Devereux**
- Edward German: Merrie England

Frances, Countess of Essex, English noblewoman

- Benjamin Britten: Gloriana

Eufrosinia, daughter of Yaroslav Osmomysl, Prince of Halych

- Alexander Borodin: Prince Igor (as Yaroslavna)

=== F ===
Marino Faliero, Doge of Venice

- Gaetano Donizetti: **Marino Faliero**

Farinelli, Italian castrato singer

- Daniel Auber: La part du diable (or **Carlo Broschi**) (as Carlo Broschi)
- John Barnett: **Farinelli**

Philo Farnsworth, American television pioneer

- Evan Hause: The Birth and Theft of Television

Fausta Flavia Maxima, Empress of Rome, second wife of Constantine the Great

- Gaetano Donizetti: **Fausta**

Charles Simon Favart, French dramatist

- Jacques Offenbach: Madame Favart

Marie Favart, French opera singer, actress

- Jacques Offenbach: **Madame Favart**

Dianne Feinstein, American politician

- Stewart Wallace: Harvey Milk

Ferdinand I, Holy Roman Emperor

- Ernst Krenek: Karl V

King Ferdinand I of León and Castile

- Claude Debussy: Rodrigue et Chimène
- Jules Massenet: Le Cid

Ferdinand II, Holy Roman Emperor

- Paul Hindemith: Die Harmonie der Welt

King Ferdinand II of Aragon (and Ferdinand V of Castile)

- Giuseppe Apolloni: L'ebreo
- Leonardo Balada: Cristóbal Colón
- Leonardo Balada: Death of Columbus
- Darius Milhaud: Christophe Colomb

King Ferdinand VI of Spain

- Daniel Auber: La part du diable (or Carlo Broschi)

Roger de Flor, German-born soldier serving Aragon kings

- Ruperto Chapí: **Roger de Flor**

Errol Flynn, Australian-American film actor

- Judith Bingham: **Flynn**

James Forrestal, US Secretary of Defense

- Evan Hause: Nightingale: The Last Days of James Forrestal

Francesco Foscari, Doge of Venice

- Giuseppe Verdi: I due Foscari

Joseph Fouché, Duke of Otranto

- Umberto Giordano: Madame Sans-Gêne

Francesca da Rimini, contemporary and literary subject of Dante

- Emil Ábrányi: **Paola és Francesca**
- Alfredo Aracil: **Francesca o El infierno de los enamorados**
- Emanuele Borgatta: **Francesca da Rimini**
- Paolo Carlini: **Francesca da Rimini**
- Fournier-Gorre: **Francesca da Rimini**
- Pietro Generali: **Francesca da Rimini**
- Hermann Goetz: **Francesca da Rimini**
- Franco Leoni: **Francesca da Rimini**
- Gioacchino Maglioni: **Francesca da Rimini**
- Luigi Mancinelli: Paolo e **Francesca**
- Saverio Mercadante: **Francesca da Rimini**
- Francesco Morlacchi: **Francesca da Rimini**
- Eugene Nordal: **Francesca da Rimini**
- Salvatore Papparlado: **Francesca da Rimini**
- Gaetano Quilici: **Francesca da Rimini**
- Sergei Rachmaninoff: **Francesca da Rimini** (as Francesca Malatesta)
- Giuseppe Staffa: **Francesca da Rimini**
- Feliciano Strepponi: **Francesca da Rimini**
- Antonio Tamburini: **Francesca da Rimini**
- Ambroise Thomas: **Françoise de Rimini**
- Riccardo Zandonai: **Francesca da Rimini**

Saint Francis of Assisi, founder of the Franciscans

- Olivier Messiaen: **Saint François d'Assise**

King Francis I of France

- Ernst Krenek: Karl V (as Franz I)
- Camille Saint-Saëns: Ascanio

Anne Frank, Dutch diarist

- Grigory Frid: The Diary of Anne Frank

Emperor Franz Joseph I of Austria

- Ralph Benatzky, Robert Stolz and Bruno Granichstaedten: The White Horse Inn

John Allen Fraser, Canadian politician

- Alexina Louie: Mulroney: The Opera

Fredegund, Merovingian Queen Consort

- César Franck: Ghiselle
- Reinhard Keiser: Fredegunda (1715)

Frederick I, Holy Roman Emperor ("Barbarossa")

- Giuseppe Verdi: La battaglia di Legnano

King Frederick II "The Great" of Prussia

- Gavin Bryars, Philip Glass, and others: The Civil Wars: A Tree Is Best Measured When It Is Down
- Giacomo Meyerbeer: Ein Feldlager in Schlesien (he does not appear on stage, but is heard playing the flute in the background)

Frederick II, Landgrave of Hesse-Homburg

- Hans Werner Henze: **Der Prinz von Homburg**

Frederick William I, Elector of Brandenburg

- Hans Werner Henze: Der Prinz von Homburg

Friedrich Friesen, German gymnast and soldier

- Wendelin Weißheimer, Theodor Körner

Jean Froissart, French chronicler

- Aulis Sallinen: Kuningas lähtee Ranskaan (The King Goes Forth to France)

Fruela I of Asturias, Fruela(or Froila) the Cruel, King of Asturias from 757 until his assassination in 768

- Franz Schubert: Alfonso und Estrella

Georg von Frundsberg, South German knight

- Ernst Krenek: Karl V

Tsar Fyodor II of Russia, son of Boris Godunov

- Modest Mussorgsky: Boris Godunov

=== G ===
Galileo Galilei, Italian scientist

- Philip Glass: **Galileo Galilei**

Vasily Vasilyevich Galitzine, Russian statesman

- Modest Mussorgsky: Khovanshchina

Galla Placidia, Roman regent, daughter of Emperor Theodosius I

- Jaume Pahissa i Jo: **Gal·la Placídia** (1913)

Vasco da Gama, Portuguese explorer

- Giacomo Meyerbeer: L'Africaine

Count Peter Gamba, associate of Lord Byron

- Virgil Thomson: Lord Byron

Mahatma Gandhi, Indian freedom advocate

- Philip Glass: Satyagraha

Garcilaso de la Vega, Spanish poet and soldier

- Ruperto Chapí: La muerte de Garcilaso

Giuseppe Garibaldi, Italian freedom fighter

- Gavin Bryars, Philip Glass and others: The Civil Wars: A Tree Is Best Measured When It Is Down

Margaret "Peggy" Garner, American slave who killed her own daughter rather than allow the child to be returned to slavery

- Richard Danielpour: **Margaret Garner**

Antoni Gaudí, Catalan architect

- Joan Guinjoan: **Gaudí**

Paul Gauguin, French painter

- Einojuhani Rautavaara: Vincent
- Michael Smetanin: **Gauguin: A Synthetic Life** (2000; libretto by Alison Croggon)
- Christopher Yavelow: The Passion of Vincent van Gogh

Artemisia Gentileschi, Florentine painter

- Laura Schwendinger: **Artemisia** (2019)

George III, King of the United Kingdom

- Peter Maxwell Davies: Eight Songs for a **Mad King**

Priscilla German Reed, English singer and actress
Thomas German Reed, English composer and theatre manager

- Thomas German Reed (with W. S. Gilbert): Our Island Home

Carlo Gesualdo, Italian composer and murderer

- Marc-André Dalbavie: **Gesualdo** (2010)
- Francesco d'Avalos: Maria di Venosa (1992)
- Scott Glasgow: **The Prince of Venosa** (1998)
- Bo Holten: **Gesualdo** (2003)
- Franz Hummek: **Gesualdo** (1998)
- Alfred Schnittke: **Gesualdo**
- Salvatore Sciarrino: Luci mie traditrici (1998)

Allen Ginsberg, Americangn poet

- Lorenzo Ferrero: Marilyn

Ruth Bader Ginsburg, American jurist

- Derrick Wang: **Scalia/Ginsburg**

Lisa del Giocondo, Italian woman, subject of Leonardo da Vinci's Mona Lisa

- Max von Schillings: **Mona Lisa** (as Mona Fiordalisa)

Salvatore Giuliano, Sicilian peasant

- Lorenzo Ferrero: **Salvatore Giuliano**

Godfrey of Bouillon, Frankish knight, leader of the First Crusade

- George Frideric Handel: Rinaldo (as Goffredo)

Boris Godunov, Tsar of Russia

- Modest Mussorgsky: **Boris Godunov**

Xenia Borisovna Godunova, daughter of Boris Godunov

- Antonín Dvořák: Dimitrij
- Modest Mussorgsky: Boris Godunov

Sir Eugene Goossens, English conductor and composer

- Drew Crawford: **Eugene** & Roie

Violet Gordon-Woodhouse, English harpsichordist

- Roger Scruton: **Violet**

St Maria Goretti, 20th century Catholic martyr

- Marcel Delannoy: **Maria Goretti**, radiophonic opera

Sidney Gottlieb,

- Evan Hause: Man: Biology of a Fall

Francisco Goya, Spanish painter

- Gian Carlo Menotti: **Goya**
- Michael Nyman: **Facing Goya** (he appears as a silent apparition)

Princess Grace of Monaco, American-born actress (as Grace Kelly)

- Michael Daugherty: Jackie O

Antonio Gramsci, Italian political theorist

- Luigi Nono: Al gran sole carico d'amore

Urbain Grandier, French priest

- Krzysztof Penderecki: The Devils of Loudun

Julia Dent Grant, American First Lady

- Philip Glass: Appomattox

Ulysses S. Grant, American President

- Philip Glass: Appomattox
- Virgil Thomson: The Mother of Us All

Thomas Gray, English poet

- Virgil Thomson: Lord Byron

Edvard Grieg, Norwegian composer
Nina Grieg, Norwegian singer, cousin and wife of Edvard Grieg

- Edvard Grieg, arr. Robert Wright and George Forrest: Song of Norway

Gen Leslie Groves, American military officer

- John Adams: Doctor Atomic

Matthias Grünewald, German renaissance painter

- Paul Hindemith: **Mathis der Maler**

Teresa, Contessa Guiccioli, Italian mistress of Lord Byron

- Virgil Thomson: Lord Byron

Guinevere, wife of King Arthur of Britain

- Ernest Chausson: Le roi Arthus (as Guenièvre)

Francis, Duke of Guise, French nobleman

- André Messager: Le bourgeois de Calais

Günther von Schwarzburg, German king

- Ignaz Holzbauer: **Günther von Schwarzburg**

Saint Guntram, King of Burgundy

- César Franck: Ghiselle

Gustav Vasa, King of Sweden

- Giuseppe Apolloni: **Gustavo Wasa**

Gustav III, King of Sweden

- Daniel Auber: **Gustave III**
- Giuseppe Verdi: Un ballo in maschera

Nell Gwyn, English actress, mistress of King Charles II

- Robert Planquette: **Nell Gwynne**

=== H ===
Hadrian, Roman emperor

- Pietro Metastasio: **Adriano in Siria**
- José de Nebra: Más gloria es triunfar de sí, o, Adriano en Siria

Emma, Lady Hamilton, English mistress of Horatio, Lord Nelson
Sir William Hamilton, British diplomat, husband of Emma, Lady Hamilton

- Lennox Berkeley: Nelson

Hannibal, Carthaginian ruler

- Johann Adolph Hasse, Domènec Terradellas, Giovanni Battista Lampugnani and Pietro Domenico Paradies: **Annibale in Capua**

King Harald Hardrada (Harald III of Norway)

- Heorhiy Maiboroda: Yaroslav Mudriy
- Judith Weir: **King Harald's Saga**

Sir Thomas Hardy, 1st Baronet, British sea captain, commander of HMS Victory at the Battle of Trafalgar

- Lennox Berkeley: Nelson

Harold Godwinson (Harold II), Anglo-Saxon King of England

- Frederic Hymen Cowen: **Harold** or the Norman Conquest
- Judith Weir: King Harald's Saga

Frank Harris, Irish-American journalist, publisher

- Theodore Morrison: Oscar

Harun al-Rashid, Abbasid Caliph

- Carl Maria von Weber: Oberon

Hasdrubal Gisco, Carthaginian general

- Francesco Cavalli: Scipione affricano

William Hastings, 1st Baron Hastings

- Giorgio Battistelli, Richard III (2004)

Richard Hauptmann, American convicted murderer

- Cary John Franklin: Loss of Eden

Harry Hawk, American actor

- Eric W. Sawyer: Our American Cousin

Wiebbe Hayes, Dutch soldier

- Richard Mills: Batavia

Heloïse, French nun associated with Peter Abelard

- Peter Tahourdin: **Héloise** and Abelard
- Charles Wilson: **Héloise** and Abelard

Sally Hemings, American mixed-race slave owned by Thomas Jefferson

- Damon Ferrante: Jefferson & Poe: A Lyric Opera

Henri, Prince of Condé, French noble

- Krzysztof Penderecki: The Devils of Loudun

Henrietta Maria of France, queen consort of Charles I of England

- Vincenzo Bellini: I puritani

Henry I, Duke of Guise

- George Onslow: **Le duc de Guise**

King Henry II of England

- Gaetano Donizetti: Rosmonda d'Inghilterra (as Enrico II)
- Otto Nicolai: Rosmonda d'Inghilterra (given at the first performance as Enrico II)

King Henry III of Castile

- Amadeu Vives i Roig: La villana

King Henry III of France also as Henri de Valois, King of Poland, Grand Duke of Lithuania

- Emmanuel Chabrier: **Le roi malgré lui**
- George Onslow: Le duc de Guise

King Henry IV of France

- Fromental Halévy: Le Roi et le batelier

King Henry V of England

- Gustav Holst: At the Boar's Head (as Prince Hal)

King Henry VII of England (as Henry, Duke of Richmond)

- Giorgio Battistelli, Richard III (2004)

King Henry VIII of England

- Sir Peter Maxwell Davies: Taverner (not identified as such)
- Gaetano Donizetti: Anna Bolena (as Enrico)
- Camille Saint-Saëns: **Henry VIII**

Henry the Fowler, Duke of Saxony, King of the Germans

- Richard Wagner: Lohengrin

Henry the Lion, German prince (Henry III of Saxony, Henry XII of Bavaria)

- Agostino Steffani: **Henrico Leone**

Marie-Jean Hérault de Séchelles, French revolutionary politician

- Gottfried von Einem: Dantons Tod

Hermann I, Landgrave of Thuringia

- Richard Wagner: **Tannhäuser**

E. T. A. Hoffmann, German author

- Jacques Offenbach: The Tales of Hoffmann

Fanny Holland, English singer and actress

- Thomas German Reed (with W. S. Gilbert): Our Island Home

Clasina Maria "Sien" Hoornik (1850–1904), Dutch alcoholic prostitute, sometime lover of Vincent van Gogh

- Einojuhani Rautavaara: Vincent

Pharaoh Horemheb of Egypt

- Philip Glass: Akhnaten

Count Claes Fredrik Horn, co-conspirator with Anckarström in the assassination of King Gustav III of Sweden

- Daniel Auber: Gustave III (as Dehorn)
- Giuseppe Verdi: Un ballo in maschera

Harry Houdini, Hungarian-American escapologist

- Peter Schat: **Houdini**

Hugh Capet, King of the Franks from 987 to 996, the founder and first king from the House of Capet

- Gaetano Donizetti: Ugo, conte di Parigi

Ladislaus Hunyadi, Hungarian statesman

- Ferenc Erkel: **Hunyadi László**

Stig Andersen Hvide, Danish marshal, later an outlaw

- Peter Arnold Heise: Drot og marsk (King and **Marshal**) (as Marshal Stig)

Queen Hypsicratea of Pontus, consort of Mithradates VI

- Francesco Cavalli: Pompeo Magno (as Issicratea)
- Alessandro Scarlatti: Mitridate Eupatore

=== I ===
Muhammad al-Idrisi, Andalusian cartographer, traveller

- Karol Szymanowski: King Roger (as Edrisi)

Gwen Ifill, American television journalist

- Curtis K. Hughes: Say It Ain't So, Joe

Saint Ignatius of Loyola, Spanish knight, founder of the Society of Jesus

- Virgil Thomson: Four Saints in Three Acts

Igor Svyatoslavich, Prince of Putivl, Novgorod-Seversk and Chernigov

- Alexander Borodin: **Prince Igor**

Jaakko Ilkka, Finnish peasant leader

- Jorma Panula: **Jaakko Ilkka**

Ingegerd Olofsdotter of Sweden

- Heorhiy Maiboroda: Yaroslav Mudriy

John Ireland, Dean of Westminster

- Virgil Thomson: Lord Byron

Isabeau of Bavaria, Queen Consort of Charles VI of France

- Fromental Halévy: Charles VI

Isabel Moctezuma (Teutile), daughter of Moctezuma II

- Antonio Vivaldi: Motezuma

Queen Isabella I of Castile

- Emilio Arrieta: La conquista de Granada
- Giuseppe Apolloni: L'ebreo
- Leonardo Balada: Cristóbal Colón
- Leonardo Balada: Death of Columbus
- Manuel de Falla: Atlàntida
- Alberto Franchetti: Cristoforo Colombo
- Philip Glass: The Voyage
- Vicente Martín y Soler: Una cosa rara
- Darius Milhaud: Christophe Colomb

Isabella of France, Queen Consort of Edward II of England and mother of Edward III

- Gaetano Donizetti: L'assedio di Calais (she is Edward III's wife in the opera; in real life, she was his mother)

Isabella of Portugal, Holy Roman Empress, Queen Consort of Aragon and Castile

- Ernst Krenek: Karl V

Tsar Ivan IV of Russia, "Ivan the Terrible"

- Georges Bizet: **Ivan IV**
- Nikolai Rimsky-Korsakov: The Noblewoman Vera Sheloga (unseen role; he is the father of Vera's child)
- Nikolai Rimsky-Korsakov: The Maid of Pskov

Izumi Shikibu, Japanese poet

- Salvatore Sciarrino: Da gelo a gelo

=== J ===
Jack the Ripper, unidentified murderer of English prostitutes

- Alban Berg: Lulu
- Phyllis Tate: The Lodger

King James II of Cyprus "James the Bastard of Lusignan"

- Gaetano Donizetti: Caterina Cornaro (as Lusignano)
- Fromental Halévy: La reine de Chypre (as Lusignan)

King James V of Scotland

- Gioachino Rossini: La donna del lago (in disguise as Uberto)

Lady Jane Grey, disputed Queen of England

- Henri Büsser: **Jane Grey**
- Nicola Vaccai: **Giovanna Gray**

Queen Jane (Seymour), third consort of Henry VIII of England

- Gaetano Donizetti: Anna Bolena

Thomas Jefferson, American President

- Damon Ferrante: **Jefferson** & Poe: A Lyric Opera

Jérôme Bonaparte, King of Westphalia

- Karl Michael Ziehrer: **König Jérôme oder Immer Lustick**

Jesus of Nazareth and his apostles

- Anton Cajetan Adlgasser: **Christus am Ölberg**
- Harrison Birtwistle: The Last Supper
- Constantine Koukias: Days and Nights with **Christ** (played by a non-singing dancer)
- Anton Rubinstein: **Christus**, sacred opera
- Josep Soler i Sardà: **Jesús de Natzaret**, opera

Jiang Qing Chinese figure, 4th wife of Mao Zedong

- John Adams: Nixon in China (as Chiang Ch'ing)
- Bright Sheng: **Madame Mao**

St Joan of Arc, French saint (see also Category:Operas about Joan of Arc)

- Walter Braunfels: **Szenen aus dem Leben der Heiligen Johanna**
- Norman Dello Joio: **The Triumph of St. Joan**
- Giselher Klebe: **Das Mädchen aus Domrémy**
- Pyotr Ilyich Tchaikovsky: **The Maid of Orleans**
- Giuseppe Verdi: **Giovanna d'Arco**
- For details of other musical depictions of Joan of Arc, see Cultural depictions of Joan of Arc#Operas, oratorios, and vocal works

Joanna I of Naples, Queen of Naples

- Juan Manén: **Giovanna di Napoli**

Joanna of Castile, Queen of Castile and Aragon

- Ernst Krenek: Karl V (as Juana)
- Enric Palomar: **Juana**

Juana I de Castilla, Queen of Castile and Aragon

- Alberto Garcia Demestres: **Juana sin sielo**

Patriarch Job of Moscow, Russian Orthodox prelate

- Antonín Dvořák: Dimitrij

John, Prince of Asturias, Spanish prince, son of Ferdinand II of Aragon and Isabella I of Castile

- Vicente Martín y Soler: Una cosa rara

King John of England

- Sir Arthur Sullivan: Ivanhoe (as Prince John)

Don John of Austria, Bavarian soldier in Spanish service, son of Charles V, Holy Roman Emperor

- Ruperto Chapí: Don Juan de Austria, zarzuela in 3 acts
- Isaac Nathan: **Don John of Austria**

John of Leiden, Dutch Anabaptist leader

- Giacomo Meyerbeer: **Le prophète** (as Jean de Leyde)

Andrew Johnson, American President

- Virgil Thomson: The Mother of Us All

Lyndon B. Johnson, American President

- Evan Hause: Nightingale: The Last Days of James Forrestal
- David T. Little: JFK

Ben Jonson, English poet

- Virgil Thomson: Lord Byron

Joseph II, Holy Roman Emperor

- Georg Jarno: Die Försterchristl (or possibly a fictitious "Franz Joseph II of Austria")

Joséphine de Beauharnais, Consort of Napoleon of France

- Emmerich Kálmán: **Kaiserin Josephine**

Julia Caesaris, daughter of Julius Caesar, 4th wife of Pompey the Great

- Francesco Cavalli: Pompeo Magno

Julius Caesar, Consul and Dictator of Rome

- Francesco Cavalli: Pompeo Magno
- Carl Heinrich Graun: **Cesare e Cleopatra**
- George Frideric Handel: **Giulio Cesare (in Egitto)**
- Giselher Klebe: **Die Ermordung Cäsars**
- Antonio Sartorio: **Giulio Cesare in Egitto**

=== K ===
Frida Kahlo, Mexican painter

- Robert Xavier Rodriguez: **Frida**

Christoph Kaufmann (or Kauffman), associate of Jakob Lenz

- Wolfgang Rihm: Jakob Lenz

Sir Edward Kelley, English occultist

- Rufus Norris and Damon Albarn: Dr Dee: An English Opera

Grace Kelly: see Princess Grace of Monaco

Ned Kelly, Australian outlaw and folk hero

- Luke Styles: **Ned Kelly**

John F. Kennedy, American President

- Michael Daugherty: Jackie O
- David T. Little: **JFK**

Rosemary Kennedy, member of the Kennedy family

- David T. Little: JFK

Johannes Kepler, German astronomer, mathematician

- Philip Glass: **Kepler**
- Paul Hindemith: Die Harmonie der Welt

Ivan Andreyevich Khovansky, "Tararui" (chatterbox), Russian boyar

- Modest Mussorgsky: **Khovanshchina**

Nikita Khrushchev, Soviet leader

- David T. Little: JFK

Edgar Ray Killen, KKK leader, murderer

- Philip Glass: Appomattox

Larry King, American talk-show host

- Mark-Anthony Turnage: Anna Nicole

Martin Luther King Jr.

- Philip Glass: Satyagraha

Henry Kissinger, American Secretary of State

- John Adams: Nixon in China

Aleksis Kivi, Finnish writer

- Einojuhani Rautavaara: **Aleksis Kivi**

Leon Klinghoffer, American ship passenger murdered by terrorists

- John Adams: **The Death of Klinghoffer**

Vasily Kochubey, Cossack hetman, associate of Ivan Mazepa

- Pyotr Ilyich Tchaikovsky: Mazeppa

Konchak, Polovtsian khan
Konchakovna, his daughter

- Alexander Borodin: Prince Igor

Theodor Körner, German poet and soldier

- Wendelin Weißheimer, **Theodor Körner**

Maria Korp, Australian murder victim

- Gordon Kerry: Midnight Son

Tadeusz Kościuszko, Polish revolutionary hero

- Franciszek Salezy Dutkiewicz: **Kościuszko nad Sekwaną** (Kościuszko at the Seine)

Anne Kronenberg, American political administrator

- Stewart Wallace: Harvey Milk

Kublai Khan, Grand Khan of the Mongol Empire

- Tan Dun: Marco Polo

Mikhail Kutuzov, Russian field marshal

- Sergei Prokofiev: War and Peace

=== L ===
Ladislaus I of Poland: see Władysław I the Elbow-high

Ladislaus the Posthumous, Duke of Austria, King of Hungary and Bohemia

- Ferenc Erkel: Hunyadi László (as László V)

Lady Caroline Lamb, lover of Lord Byron

- Virgil Thomson: Lord Byron

Anne Françoise Elisabeth Lange, French actress, known as "Mademoiselle Lange"

- Charles Lecocq: La fille de Madame Angot

Adrienne Lecouvreur, French actress

- Francesco Cilea: **Adriana Lecouvreur**

Eleanor Agnes Lee, daughter of Robert E. Lee
Mary Anna Custis Lee, wife of Robert E. Lee

- Philip Glass: Appomattox

General Robert E. Lee

- Gavin Bryars, Philip Glass and others: The Civil Wars: A Tree Is Best Measured When It Is Down
- Philip Glass: Appomattox

François Joseph Lefebvre, Marshal of France, Duke of Danzig

- Ivan Caryll: The Duchess of Dantzic
- Umberto Giordano: Madame Sans-Gêne

His wife, née Cathérine Hubscher, later Duchess of Danzig
- Ivan Caryll: **The Duchess of Dantzic** (as Catherine Üpscher)
- Umberto Giordano: **Madame Sans-Gêne**

Guillaume Le Gentil, French astronomer

- Victor Davies: Transit of Venus

Robert Dudley, 1st Earl of Leicester, English courtier, favourite of Elizabeth I

- Gaetano Donizetti: Il castello di Kenilworth
- Gaetano Donizetti: Maria Stuarda (as Roberto)
- Gioachino Rossini: Elisabetta, regina d'Inghilterra

Augusta Leigh, half-sister and incestuous lover of Lord Byron

- Virgil Thomson: Lord Byron

Jakob Michael Reinhold Lenz, German writer

- Wolfgang Rihm: **Jakob Lenz**

Pope St Leo I "The Great"

- Giuseppe Verdi: Attila (as Leone)

Brother Leo, friend and confidant of Francis of Assisi

- Olivier Messiaen: Saint François d'Assise

Leonidas of Epirus

- George Frideric Handel: Alessandro

(i) Marcus Aemilius Lepidus, Roman triumvir

- Samuel Barber: Antony and Cleopatra

(ii) Marcus Aemilius Lepidus, heir to Roman emperor Caligula

- Reinhard Keiser: Octavia

Leszek I the White, High Duke of Poland 1194-1227

- Józef Elsner: **Leszek Biały**

Ada Leverson, British novelist

- Theodore Morrison: Oscar

Li Bai or Li Po, Chinese poet

- Tan Dun: Marco Polo

Liliuokalani, Queen of Hawaii

- Paul Abraham: **Die Blume von Hawaii**, operetta

Abraham Lincoln, American President
Mary Todd Lincoln, American First Lady

- Gavin Bryars, Philip Glass and others: The Civil Wars: A Tree Is Best Measured When It Is Down
- Philip Glass: Appomattox
- Eric W. Sawyer: Our American Cousin

Anne Morrow Lindbergh, American writer and aviator

- Cary John Franklin: Loss of Eden

Charles Lindbergh, American pioneer aviator

- Cary John Franklin: Loss of Eden
- Paul Hindemith and Kurt Weill: Der Lindberghflug (Lindbergh's Flight). This was later changed by removal of Hindemith's contribution, renaming it to Der Ozeanflug (The Flight across the Ocean), and removal of Lindbergh's name. The opening line was changed from "My name is Charles Lindbergh" to "My name is of no account".

Alexander Litvinenko, murdered Russian-British security operative

- Anthony Bolton: **The Life and Death of Alexander Litvinenko**

Judah Loew ben Bezalel, Bohemian Talmudic scholar

- Nicolae Bretan: Golem (as Rabbi Lőw)
- Eugen d'Albert: Der Golem

King Louis V of France

- Gaetano Donizetti: Ugo, conte di Parigi

King Louis VI of France

- Carl Maria von Weber: Euryanthe

King Louis XII of France

- André Messager: La Basoche

King Louis XIII of France

- Charles Gounod: Cinq-Mars

King Louis XIV of France

- Léo Delibes: **Le roi l'a dit** (unseen role; he is referred to by the other characters)

King Louis XV of France

- Michel Richard Delalande and André Cardinal Destouches: Les élémens (represented by a chorus)
- Leo Fall: Madame Pompadour

King Louis XVI of France

- John Corigliano: The Ghosts of Versailles

Francis Lovell, 1st Viscount Lovell

- Giorgio Battistelli, Richard III (2004)

Lucan, Roman poet

- Claudio Monteverdi: L'incoronazione di Poppea

Lucretia, Roman noblewoman raped by Sextus Tarquinius (legendary)

- Benjamin Britten: **The Rape of Lucretia**
- Ottorino Respighi: **Lucrezia**

Andrey Lugovoy, Russian businessman, politician

- Anthony Bolton: The Life and Death of Alexander Litvinenko

Martin Luther, initiator of the Protestant Reformation

- Ernst Krenek: Karl V

Ludwig Adolf Wilhelm von Lützow, Prussian general

- Wendelin Weißheimer, Theodor Körner

=== M ===
Douglas MacArthur, American general

- Lorenzo Ferrero: Marilyn

Jeanette MacDonald, American soprano, actress

- Edwin Penhorwood: Too Many Sopranos (spoofed as "Just Jeannette")

Sir John A. Macdonald, first Prime Minister of Canada
William McDougall, Canadian politician

- Harry Somers: Louis Riel

Ralph McGill, American anti-segregationist journalist

- Michael Braz: A Scholar Under Siege

Wilmer McLean, American Civil War figure

- Philip Glass: Appomattox

Colin McPhee, Canadian composer and musicologist

- Evan Ziporyn: A House in Bali

Macbeth, King of Scotland

- Ernest Bloch: **Macbeth**
- Iain Hamilton: **The Tragedy of Macbeth**
- Salvatore Sciarrino: **Macbeth**
- Giuseppe Verdi: **Macbeth**

Lucius Aemilius Paullus Macedonicus, Roman general, natural father of Scipio Aemilianus

- Wolfgang Amadeus Mozart: Il sogno di Scipione, K. 126

Gaius Maecenas, political adviser to Octavian (Caesar Augustus)

- Samuel Barber: Antony and Cleopatra

Saint Magnus Erlendsson, Earl of Orkney

- Peter Maxwell Davies: **The Martyrdom of St Magnus**

Gustav Mahler, Austrian composer

- Tan Dun: Marco Polo

Marion Mahony, American architect and artist, wife of Walter Burley Griffin

- Daron Hagen: Shining Brow

Giovanni Malatesta, husband and murderer of Francesca da Rimini

- Sergei Rachmaninoff: Francesca da Rimini (as Lanciotto Malatesta)
- Riccardo Zandonai: Francesca da Rimini (as Giovanni lo Sciancato)

Malatestino Malatesta, Lord of Rimini

- Riccardo Zandonai: Francesca da Rimini (as Malatestino dall'Occhio)

Paolo Malatesta, brother-in-law and lover of Francesca da Rimini

- Sergei Rachmaninoff: Francesca da Rimini
- Riccardo Zandonai: Francesca da Rimini (as Paolo il Bello)

La Malinche, Aztec mistress of Hernán Cortés

- Lorenzo Ferrero: La Conquista
- Wolfgang Rihm: Die Eroberung von Mexico
- Roger Sessions: Montezuma

Mao Zedong, Chinese leader

- John Adams: Nixon in China (as Mao Tse-tung)

Madame Mao: see Jiang Qing

Jean-Paul Marat, Jacobin leader

- Lorenzo Ferrero: Charlotte Corday

Benedetto Marcello, Italian composer

- Joachim Raff: **Benedetto Marcello**

Alexey Maresyev, Russian fighter pilot

- Sergei Prokofiev: The Story of a Real Man

Margaret of Anjou, Queen consort to Henry VI of England

- Giacomo Meyerbeer: Margherita d'Anjou

Marguérite de Valois, consort of Henry IV of France and III of Navarre

- Ferdinand Hérold: Le pré aux clercs
- Giacomo Meyerbeer: Les Huguenots

Maria Carolina of Austria

- Umberto Giordano: Madame Sans-Gêne

Sister Maria Celeste, Italian nun, illegitimate daughter of Galileo Galilei

- Philip Glass: Galileo Galilei

Maria Luisa Fernanda, Duchess of Montpensier, Infanta of Spain

- Johann Strauss II: Cagliostro in Wien

Marie Antoinette, Queen Consort of Louis XVI of France

- John Corigliano: The Ghosts of Versailles

Marie Louise, Duchess of Parma, wife of Napoleon I

- Arthur Honegger and Jacques Ibert: L'Aiglon

Marie Louise Gonzaga, French Queen consort to 2 Polish kings

- Charles Gounod: Cinq-Mars

Empress Maria Theresa of Austria

- Johann Strauss II: Cagliostro in Wien

Guadalupe Marín, Mexican model and novelist, second wife of Diego Rivera

- Robert Xavier Rodriguez: Frida (as Lupe)

Mark Antony, Roman politician and general

- John Adams: **Antony** and Cleopatra
- Samuel Barber: **Antony** and Cleopatra
- Domenico Cimarosa: La Cleopatra
- Louis Gruenberg: **Antony** and Cleopatra
- Henry Kimball Hadley: Cleopatra's Night
- Giselher Klebe: Die Ermordung Cäsars
- Jules Massenet: Cléopâtre

Auguste de Marmont

- Arthur Honegger and Jacques Ibert: L'Aiglon

Martyrs of Compiègne, a group of French Carmelite nuns

- Francis Poulenc: Dialogues of the Carmelites

Saint Mary of Egypt, patron saint of penitents

- Ottorino Respighi: **Maria egiziaca**
- John Tavener: **Mary of Egypt**

Mary, Queen of Scots

- Gaetano Donizetti: **Maria Stuarda**
- Thea Musgrave: **Mary, Queen of Scots**
- Louis Niedermeyer: **Marie Stuart**

Queen Mary I of England "Bloody Mary"

- Antônio Carlos Gomes: **Maria Tudor**
- Giovanni Pacini: **Maria, regina d'Inghilterra**

Mary Tudor, Queen of France, sister of Henry VIII, husband of Louis XII

- André Messager: La Basoche

Masaniello (Tommaso Aniello), Neapolitan fisherman, revolutionary leader

- Daniel Auber: La muette de Portici (aka **Masaniello**)
- Antônio Carlos Gomes: Salvator Rosa
- Reinhard Keiser: **Masagniello**
- Reinhard Keiser: Die neapolitanische Fischer-Empörung oder **Masaniello furioso**
- Jacopo Napoli: **Mas' Aniello**

Masinissa, first King of Numidia

- Francesco Cavalli: Scipione affricano

Mata Hari, Dutch spy

- Gavin Bryars, Philip Glass and others: The Civil Wars: A Tree Is Best Measured When It Is Down

Matthias, Holy Roman Emperor

- Antonín Dvořák: **King** and Charcoal Burner

King Matthias Corvinus of Hungary

- Ferenc Erkel: Hunyadi László (as Mátyás Hunyadi)

Maurice, Elector of Saxony

- Ernst Krenek: Karl V

Maurice de Saxe

- Francesco Cilea: Adriana Lecouvreur
- Jacques Offenbach: Madame Favart

Marcus Aurelius Valerius Maximianus Herculius, aka Maximian, Roman ruler

- Gaetano Donizetti: Fausta

Maximinian, co-Emperor of Rome

- Henry Purcell: Dioclesian

Ivan Mazepa, Cossack hetman, military leader

- Pyotr Ilyich Tchaikovsky: **Mazeppa**

Joseph McCarthy, American politician, demagogue

- Gregory Spears: Fellow Travelers

Col. Robert R. McCormick, American newspaper publisher

- Alexina Louie: Mulroney: The Opera

Catherine de' Medici

- George Onslow: **Le duc de Guise**

Cosimo de' Medici, ruler of Florence

- Fromental Halévy: Guido et Ginevra

Giuliano de' Medici, son of Lorenzo the Magnificent
Lorenzo de' Medici, "Lorenzo the Magnificent", Italian statesman

- Ruggero Leoncavallo: I Medici

Lorenzino de' Medici, Italian writer and assassin

- Giovanni Pacini: **Lorenzino de' Medici**

Ottoman Sultan Mehmed II

- Gioachino Rossini: **Maometto II**
- Gioachino Rossini: Le siège de Corinthe (as Mahomet II)

Aleksandr Danilovich Menshikov, Russian statesman

- André Grétry: Pierre le Grand

Bartolomeo Merelli, Italian impresario and librettist

- Lorenzo Ferrero: Risorgimento!

Valeria Messalina, Roman Empress

- Isidore de Lara: **Messaline**

Caecilia Metella Dalmatica, fourth wife of Lucius Cornelius Sulla

- George Frideric Handel: Silla

Cornelia Metella, Pompey's second wife

- George Frideric Handel: Giulio Cesare (in Egitto) (as Cornelia)

Klemens Wenzel, Prince von Metternich

- Arthur Honegger and Jacques Ibert: L'Aiglon

Harvey Milk, American politician and gay activist

- Stewart Wallace: **Harvey Milk**

Christina Miller, Scottish chemist

- Julian Wagstaff: Breathe Freely

John Milton, English poet

- Gaspare Spontini: **Milton**
- Virgil Thomson: Lord Byron

Gilbert Elliot-Murray-Kynynmound, 1st Earl of Minto, Scottish diplomat, Governor-General of India

- Lennox Berkeley: Nelson

King Mithridates VI Eupator, King of Pontus

- Francesco Cavalli: Pompeo Magno
- Wolfgang Amadeus Mozart: **Mitridate, re di Ponto**
- Alessandro Scarlatti: **Mitridate Eupatore**
- Domènec Terradellas: **Mitridate**

Marina Mniszech, Polish noble and Russian political adventurer

- Antonín Dvořák: Dimitrij
- Victorin de Joncières: Dimitri
- Modest Mussorgsky: Boris Godunov

Moctezuma II, Aztec ruler

- Lorenzo Ferrero: La Conquista
- Carl Heinrich Graun: Montezuma
- Henry Kimball Hadley: Azora, the Daughter of Montezuma
- Josef Mysliveček: Motezuma
- Wolfgang Rihm: Die Eroberung von Mexico
- Antonio Sacchini: Montezuma
- Roger Sessions: Montezuma
- Antonio Vivaldi: Motezuma
- Niccolò Antonio Zingarelli: Montesuma

King Mojmír II of Great Moravia

- Eugen Suchoň: Svätopluk

Marilyn Monroe, American actress

- Gavin Bryars: **Marilyn** Forever
- Lorenzo Ferrero: **Marilyn**
- Igor Wakhévitch: Être Dieu: opéra-poème, audiovisuel et cathare en six parties (a creation of Salvador Dalí; Monroe is doing a striptease with Catherine the Great of Russia)

Guy de Montfort, Count of Nola, Anglo-Italian condottiero

- Giuseppe Verdi: Les vêpres siciliennes

Thomas Moore, Irish poet, songwriter

- Virgil Thomson: Lord Byron

Mordred, legendary Arthurian character

- Isaac Albéniz: Merlin
- Ernest Chausson: Le roi Arthus

Thomas Morton, American colonist of New England

- Howard Hanson: Merry Mount

George Moscone, Mayor of San Francisco

- Stewart Wallace: Harvey Milk

Moses, biblical character

- Gioacchino Rossini: Mosè in Egitto
- Arnold Schoenberg: Moses und Aron
- Myroslav Skoryk: Moses

Charles Blount, 8th Baron Mountjoy, Elizabethan figure

- Benjamin Britten: Gloriana

Wolfgang Amadeus Mozart, Austrian composer

- P. D. Q. Bach (Peter Schickele): A Little Nightmare Music
- Reynaldo Hahn: Mozart (musical comedy)
- Nikolai Rimsky-Korsakov: Mozart and Salieri

Gaius Mucius Scaevola, Roman figure

- Francesco Cavalli: Mutio Scevola
- George Frideric Handel: Muzio Scevola

Muhammad XI of Granada, aka Boabdil, last Nasrid ruler of Granada

- Giuseppe Apolloni: L'ebreo
- Emilio Arrieta: La conquista di Granata
- Moritz Moszkowski: Boabdil der letzte Maurenkönig
- Baltasar Saldoni: Boabdil, ultimo rey de Granada

Brian Mulroney, Prime Minister of Canada
Mila Mulroney, Canadian First Lady

- Alexina Louie: **Mulroney: The Opera**

Ottoman Sultan Murad II

- Antonio Vivaldi: Scanderbeg (as Amurat II)

Bartolomé Esteban Murillo, Spanish Baroque painter

- Josep Soler i Sardà: **Murillo**

John Murray II, British publisher

- Virgil Thomson: Lord Byron

Eadweard Muybridge, English pioneer photographer

- Philip Glass: The Photographer

=== N ===
Emperor Napoleon I of France (Napoleon Bonaparte)

- Ivan Caryll: The Duchess of Dantzic
- Eugen d'Albert: Der Stier von Olivera
- Umberto Giordano: Madame Sans-Gêne
- Emmerich Kálmán: Kaiserin Josephine
- Sergei Prokofiev: War and Peace

Emperor Napoleon II of France

- Arthur Honegger and Jacques Ibert: **L'Aiglon**
- Petar Stojanović: **Napoleon II: Herzog von Reichstadt**

Louis, comte de Narbonne-Lara

- Ivan Caryll: The Duchess of Dantzic (as Comte de Narbonne)

Carrie Nation, American temperance advocate and vandal

- Douglas Moore: **Carry Nation**

Nebuchadnezzar II, king of Babylon

- Benjamin Britten: The Burning Fiery Furnace
- Giuseppe Verdi: **Nabucco**

Nefertiti, wife of Pharaoh Akhenaten of Egypt

- Philip Glass: Akhnaten

Adam Albert von Neipperg, Austrian general

- Umberto Giordano: Madame Sans-Gêne

Frances Nelson, Lady Nelson, wife of Lord Nelson

- Lennox Berkeley: Nelson

Horatio Nelson, 1st Viscount Nelson, British admiral, naval hero

- Lennox Berkeley: **Nelson**

Emperor Nero of Rome

- Arrigo Boito: **Nerone**
- George Frideric Handel: Agrippina
- Reinhard Keiser: Octavia
- Juan Manén: Acté and **Neró i Acté**
- Pietro Mascagni: **Nerone** (as Claudio Cesare Nerone)
- Claudio Monteverdi: L'incoronazione di Poppea
- Anton Rubinstein: **Néron**

Tsar Nicholas II of Russia

- Deborah Drattell: **Nicholas** and Alexandra

Nitocris, Queen of Egypt, maybe legendary

- Maria Teresa Agnesi Pinottini: **Nitocri**

Pat Nixon, American First Lady

- John Adams: Nixon in China

Richard Nixon, American President

- John Adams: **Nixon in China**

Rikard Nordraak, Norwegian composer

- Edvard Grieg, arr. Robert Wright and George Forrest: Song of Norway

Thomas Howard, 3rd Duke of Norfolk, English politician, uncle to two of Henry VIII's wives

- Camille Saint-Saëns: Henry VIII

Thomas Howard, 4th Duke of Norfolk, English nobleman

- Gioachino Rossini: Elisabetta, regina d'Inghilterra

Rosaleen Norton, so-called "Witch of Kings Cross", Sydney occultist

- Drew Crawford: Eugene & **Roie**

Charles Howard, 1st Earl of Nottingham, English admiral and statesman

- Gaetano Donizetti: Roberto Devereux

=== O ===
J. F. Oberlin, Alsatian pastor, philanthropist

- Wolfgang Rihm: Jakob Lenz

Empress Claudia Octavia of Rome, consort of Nero

- Reinhard Keiser: **Octavia**
- Claudio Monteverdi: L'incoronazione di Poppea

Octavia the Younger, fourth wife of Mark Antony

- Samuel Barber: Antony and Cleopatra
- Jules Massenet: Cléopâtre

King Olaf I Tryggvason of Norway

- Ragnar Søderlind: **Olav Tryggvason**

King Olaf II of Norway (Saint Olaf)

- Judith Weir: King Harald's Saga

Frank Olson, American biochemist

- Evan Hause: Man: Biology of a Fall

Aristotle Onassis, Greek shipping magnate

- Michael Daugherty: Jackie O

Jacqueline Kennedy Onassis, American First Lady, wife of John F. Kennedy, then of Aristotle Onassis

- Michael Daugherty: **Jackie O**
- David T. Little: JFK

J. Robert Oppenheimer, American physicist

- John Adams: **Doctor Atomic**

Sallustia Orbiana, wife of Emperor Alexander Severus of Rome

- George Frideric Handel: Alessandro Severo

Pylyp Orlyk, associate of Ivan Mazepa

- Pyotr Ilyich Tchaikovsky: Mazeppa

Pier Francesco Orsini, Italian condottiero

- Alberto Ginastera: Bomarzo

Emperor Marcus Salvius Otho of Rome

- Antonio Vivaldi: **Ottone in villa**

=== P-Q ===
María de Padilla, mistress and secret wife of Peter of Castile

- Gaetano Donizetti: **Maria Padilla**

Niccolò Paganini, Italian violinist and composer

- Sir Harrison Birtwistle: The Second Mrs Kong

Giovanni Pierluigi da Palestrina, Italian composer

- Hans Pfitzner: **Palestrina**
- Johann Sachs: **Palestrina**

Sarah Palin, American politician, Governor of Alaska, vice-presidential candidate

- Curtis K. Hughes: Say It Ain't So, Joe

Papantzin, Aztec princess, sister of Moctezuma II

- Henry Kimball Hadley: Azora, the Daughter of Montezuma

Johan Papegoja, Governor of New Sweden

- Wilhelm Peterson-Berger: The Doomsday Prophets

Ely S. Parker, American Seneca native, Commissioner of Indian Affairs

- Philip Glass: Appomattox

Boris Pasternak, Russian novelist

- Nigel Osborne: The Electrification of the Soviet Union (narrator)

Francisco Pelsaert, Dutch merchant, naval commander

- Richard Mills: Batavia

Samuel Pepys, English diarist

- Albert Coates: **Samuel Pepys**

Henry Percy, 6th Earl of Northumberland

- Gaetano Donizetti: Anna Bolena

Alonso Pérez de Guzmán, Castilian nobleman, known as Guzmán el Bueno

- Tomás Bretón: **Guzmán el Bueno**
- Baltasar Saldoni: **Guzmán el Bueno**

Giovanni Battista Pergolesi, Italian composer

- Emilio Arrieta: **Pergolesi**
- Paolo Serrao: **Pergolesi**

Pericles, Athenian statesman

- Henri Christiné: Phi-Phi

Saint Peter, Christian apostle

- Harrison Birtwistle: The Last Supper
- Edwin Penhorwood: Too Many Sopranos

King Peter III of Aragon, "Peter the Great"

- Hector Berlioz: Béatrice et Bénédict (Don Pedro)
- Felip Pedrell: Els Pirineus
- Charles Villiers Stanford: Much ado about nothing

King Peter of Castile, "Peter the Cruel"

- Gaetano Donizetti: Maria Padilla (as Don Pedro, Prince of Castile)
- Hilarión Eslava: **Pietro il Crudele**

Tsar Peter I "The Great" of Russia

- Gaetano Donizetti: Il falegname di Livonia, o **Pietro il grande, czar delle Russie**
- Gaetano Donizetti: **Il borgomastro di Saardam**
- André Grétry: **Pierre le Grand**
- Louis-Antoine Jullien: **Pietro il grande** (1852)
- Albert Lortzing: **Zar** und Zimmermann
- Giacomo Meyerbeer: L'étoile du nord

Peter the Hermit, priest and leader of the First Crusade

- Charles Gounod: La nonne sanglante

Gaius Petronius Arbiter, Roman courtier, writer

- Claudio Monteverdi: L'incoronazione di Poppea

Michele Pezza, Neapolitan guerilla leader, known as "Fra Diavolo"

- Daniel Auber: **Fra Diavolo**

King Pharnaces II of Pontus

- Francesco Cavalli: Pompeo Magno (as Farnace)
- Francesco Corselli: **Farnace**
- Wolfgang Amadeus Mozart: Mitridate, re di Ponto
- Josef Mysliveček: **Farnace**
- Alessandro Scarlatti: Mitridate Eupatore
- Leonardo Vinci: **Farnace**
- Antonio Vivaldi: **Farnace**

Phidias, Greek sculptor

- Henri Christiné: **Phi-Phi**

King Philip II of Spain

- Isaac Nathan: Don John of Austria (disguised as Count de Santa Fiore)
- Giuseppe Verdi: Don Carlos

King Philip V of Spain

- John Barnett: Farinelli

Mariana de Pineda, Spanish liberalist heroine.

- Alberto Garcia Demestres: Mariana en sombras

Gaspare Pisciotta, Sicilian peasant

- Lorenzo Ferrero: Salvatore Giuliano

Gaius Calpurnius Piso, Roman senator

- Reinhard Keiser: Octavia

Pope Pius IV

- Hans Pfitzner: Palestrina

Sylvia Plath

- Adriana Hölszky: Giuseppe e Sylvia (2000)

Edgar Allan Poe, American writer

- Dominic Argento, The Voyage of Edgar Allan Poe
- Damon Ferrante: Jefferson & Poe: A Lyric Opera

Anna Politkovskaya, Russian journalist, human rights activist

- Anthony Bolton: The Life and Death of Alexander Litvinenko

Poliziano (Angelo Ambrogini), Italian renaissance poet, scholar

- Ruggero Leoncavallo: I Medici

Marco Polo, Italian adventurer

- Tan Dun: **Marco Polo**

Saint Polyeuctus

- Gaetano Donizetti: **Poliuto**
- Charles Gounod: **Polyeucte**

Lorenz Truchsess von Pommersfelden

- Paul Hindemith: Mathis der Maler

Madame de Pompadour, French courtier, mistress of Louis XV

- Leo Fall: **Madame Pompadour**
- Edwin Penhorwood: Too Many Sopranos (spoofed as "Madame Popmpous")

Pompey the Great, Roman military and political leader

- Francesco Cavalli: **Pompeo Magno**

Empress Poppaea Augusta Sabina, consort of Roman Emperor Nero

- George Frideric Handel: Agrippina
- Claudio Monteverdi: **L'incoronazione di Poppea**

Lars Porsena, King of Etruria

- Filippo Amadei, Giovanni Bononcini and George Frideric Handel: Muzio Scevola

Porus, King of Paurava

- George Frideric Handel: **Poro**

Charles E. Potter, American politician

- Gregory Spears: Fellow Travelers

Sister Helen Prejean, American nun, death penalty abolitionist

- Jake Heggie: Dead Man Walking

Přemysl, the Ploughman, first ruler of Bohemia

- Tomaso Albinoni: Primislao, primo re di Boemia

John of Procida, Italian medieval physician and diplomat

- Giuseppe Verdi: Les vêpres siciliennes

John Proctor, a tavern keeper in 17th century Massachusetts who was hanged for witchcraft during the Salem witch trials

- Robert Ward: The Crucible

Chevalier de Prokesch-Osten

- Arthur Honegger and Jacques Ibert: L'Aiglon

Marcel Proust, French novelist

- Alfred Schnittke: Life with an Idiot

Pharaoh Ptolemy IX Lathyros of Egypt

- George Frideric Handel: **Tolomeo**

Pharaoh Ptolemy XI Alexander II of Egypt

- George Frideric Handel: Tolomeo

Publius Valerius Publicola, Roman consul

- George Frideric Handel: Muzio Scevola

Yemelyan Pugachev, Russian pretender to the throne

- César Cui: The Captain's Daughter

Qin Shi Huang, first Emperor of unified China

- Tan Dun: **The First Emperor**

Vasco de Quiroga, member of the second Audiencia in Mexico and first bishop of Michoacán

- Miguel Bernal Jiménez: **Tata Vasco**

=== R ===
Nikolay Raevsky, Russian general

- Sergei Prokofiev: War and Peace

Gilles de Rais, French soldier and serial killer of children

- Walter Braunfels: Szenen aus dem Leben der Heiligen Johanna

Elizabeth Raleigh, wife of Sir Walter Raleigh

- Edward German: Merrie England (as Bessie Throckmorton)

Sir Walter Raleigh, English explorer and courtier

- Benjamin Britten: Gloriana
- Gaetano Donizetti: Roberto Devereux
- Edward German: Merrie England

Raphael, Italian painter

- Anton Arensky: **Raphael**

Grigori Rasputin, Russian mystic, confidant of Tsarina Alexandra

- Einojuhani Rautavaara: **Rasputin**

Rastislav of Moravia, second ruler of Moravia

- Eugen Suchoň: Svätopluk

Sir Richard Ratcliffe

- Giorgio Battistelli, Richard III (2004)

John Aaron Rawlins, American general, Secretary of War

- Philip Glass: Appomattox

Stenka Razin, cossack leader

- Nikolay Afanasyev: Stenka Razin

Nancy Reagan, US First Lady

- Alexina Louie: Mulroney: The Opera

Ronald Reagan, President of the United States

- Alexina Louie: Mulroney: The Opera
- Erkki-Sven Tüür: Wallenberg

Wilhelm Reich, Austrian-American psychiatrist and psychoanalyst

- Lorenzo Ferrero: Marilyn

Count Adolf Ludvig Ribbing, co-conspirator with Anckarström in the assassination of King Gustav III of Sweden

- Daniel Auber: Gustave III
- Giuseppe Verdi: Un ballo in maschera

Penelope Rich, Lady Rich, English noblewoman

- Benjamin Britten: Gloriana

King Richard I "Coeur de Lion" of England

- André Grétry: **Richard Coeur-de-lion**
- George Frideric Handel: **Riccardo Primo**
- Heinrich Marschner: Der Templer und die Jüdin (as the Black Knight)
- Sir Arthur Sullivan: Ivanhoe

King Richard II of England

- Reginald De Koven: The Canterbury Pilgrims

King Richard III of England

- Giorgio Battistelli, **Richard III** (2004)
- Flavio Testi: **Riccardo III**

Prince Richard (Richard of Shrewsbury, Duke of York)

- Giorgio Battistelli, Richard III (2004)

Rafael del Riego, Spanish general

- José Melchor Gomis: Le diable à Seville

Louis Riel, executed Canadian rebel

- Harry Somers: **Louis Riel**

Cola di Rienzo, Roman tribune

- Richard Wagner: **Rienzi**

Rainer Maria Rilke, Austrian poet

- Nikolai Korndorf: MR (Marina and **Rainer**)

Arthur Rimbaud, French poet

- Lorenzo Ferrero: **Rimbaud, ou le fils du soleil**

Diego Rivera, Mexican painter

- Robert Xavier Rodriguez: Frida

King Robert I of Scotland, "Robert the Bruce"

- Gioachino Rossini: **Robert Bruce** (pastiche)

Robert I, Duke of Normandy

- Giacomo Meyerbeer: **Robert le diable**

Maximilien Robespierre, French revolutionary figure

- John Eaton: Danton and **Robespierre**
- Gottfried von Einem: Dantons Tod
- Henry Litolff: **Robespierre**

Robin Hood (legendary)

- W. H. Birch: The Merrie Men of Sherwood Forest
- Heinrich Marschner: Der Templer und die Jüdin (as Lokslei)
- Sir Arthur Sullivan: Ivanhoe (as Locksley)
- Robin Hood (opera) (disambiguation)

John Wilmot, 2nd Earl of Rochester, English writer, libertine

- Robert Planquette: Nell Gwynne

Roderic, Visigothic King of Hispania

- Alberto Ginastera: **Don Rodrigo**

King Roger II of Sicily

- Karol Szymanowski: **King Roger**

Rogneda of Polotsk, consort of Vladimir I of Kiev

- Alexander Serov: **Rogneda**

Theodore Roosevelt, 26th US President

- Scott Joplin: A Guest of Honor

Salvator Rosa, Italian painter and poet

- Antônio Carlos Gomes: **Salvator Rosa**

Gioachino Rossini

- Bernhard Paumgartner, **Rossini in Naples**

Roxana, wife of Alexander the Great

- George Frideric Handel: Alessandro

Rudolf II, Holy Roman Emperor

- Paul Hindemith: Die Harmonie der Welt

Rudolf II, Count Palatine of the Rhine

- Ignaz Holzbauer: Günther von Schwarzburg

Paavo Ruotsalainen, Finnish farmer and lay preacher

- Joonas Kokkonen: The Last Temptations

Lillian Russell, American actress and singer

- Virgil Thomson: The Mother of Us All

Rustichello da Pisa, Italian writer

- Tan Dun: Marco Polo

=== S ===
Hans Sachs, German meistersinger

- Albert Lortzing: **Hans Sachs**
- Richard Wagner: Die Meistersinger von Nürnberg

Oliver Sacks, British neurologist, writer

- Michael Nyman: The Man Who Mistook His Wife for a Hat (as Dr. S.)

Louis Antoine de Saint-Just, French revolutionary figure

- Gottfried von Einem: Dantons Tod

Ōtomo no Sakanoe no Iratsume, Japanese poet

- Nikolai Korndorf: MR (Marina and Rainer)

Antonio Salieri, Italian-Austrian composer

- P. D. Q. Bach (Peter Schickele): A Little Nightmare Music
- Nikolai Rimsky-Korsakov: Mozart and **Salieri**

Robert Cecil, 1st Earl of Salisbury, Elizabethan minister

- Benjamin Britten: Gloriana
- Gaetano Donizetti: Roberto Devereux

Sappho, ancient Greek poet

- Charles Gounod: **Sapho**
- Giovanni Pacini: **Saffo**

Sardanapalus, king of Assyria

- Giulio Alary: **Sardanapale**
- Franz Liszt: **Sardanapale**

William Sargant, British psychiatrist

- Evan Hause: Man: Biology of a Fall

David Sarnoff, American television pioneer

- Evan Hause: The Birth and Theft of Television

Girolamo Savonarola, Florentine heretic and book-burner

- Sir Charles Villiers Stanford: **Savonarola** (1884)

Diane Sawyer, American television journalist

- Curtis K. Hughes: Say It Ain't So, Joe

Antonin Scalia, American jurist

- Derrick Wang: **Scalia/Ginsburg**

Sylvester von Schaumberg

- Paul Hindemith: Mathis der Maler

Hans and Sophie Scholl, sibling co-founders of non-violent resistance movement The White Rose

- Udo Zimmermann: Weiße Rose

Kurt Schwitters, German painter

- Michael Nyman: Man and Boy: Dada

Scipio Aemilianus, aka Scipio Africanus the Younger, Roman general, nephew and adopted son of Scipio Africanus the Elder

- Wolfgang Amadeus Mozart: **Il sogno di Scipione**, K. 126

Scipio Africanus, aka Scipio Africanus the Elder, Roman general

- Joachim Albertini: **Scipione Africano**
- Francesco Cavalli: **Scipione affricano**
- George Frideric Handel: **Scipione**
- Wolfgang Amadeus Mozart: **Il sogno di Scipione**, K. 126
- Antonio Sacchini: **Scipione in Cartagena**

King Sebastian of Portugal

- Gaetano Donizetti: **Dom Sébastien**

Seleucus I Nicator, King of Syria, founder of the Seleucid Empire

- Étienne Méhul: Stratonice
- Jean-Philippe Rameau: Les fêtes de Polymnie

Seneca the Younger, Roman philosopher, dramatist

- Gavin Bryars, Philip Glass and others: The Civil Wars: A Tree Is Best Measured When It Is Down
- Reinhard Keiser: Octavia
- Claudio Monteverdi: L'incoronazione di Poppea

Sesostris, legendary king of Egypt

- Andrea Adolfati: **Sesostri, re d'Egitto**
- Domènec Terradellas: **Sesostri, re d'Egitto**

Sextus Pompey, Roman general, son of Pompey the Great

- Francesco Cavalli: Pompeo Magno
- George Frideric Handel: Giulio Cesare (in Egitto) (as Sesto)

William Shakespeare, English playwright

- Tan Dun: Marco Polo
- Ambroise Thomas: Le songe d'une nuit d'été

Fyodor Shaklovity, Russian diplomat

- Modest Mussorgsky: Khovanshchina

Andrey Shchelkalov, Russian administrator, official

- Modest Mussorgsky: Boris Godunov

Percy Bysshe Shelley, English poet

- Virgil Thomson: Lord Byron

John Talbot, 1st Earl of Shrewsbury, English soldier

- Giuseppe Verdi: Giovanna d'Arco (as Talbot)

George Talbot, 6th Earl of Shrewsbury, English statesman

- Gaetano Donizetti: Maria Stuarda (as Giorgio Talbot)

Sigismund, Holy Roman Emperor

- Fromental Halévy: La Juive

George Kastrioti Skanderbeg, Albanian national hero

- François Francoeur: **Scanderbeg**
- Antonio Vivaldi: **Scanderbeg**

Bengt Skytte, Swedish official

- Wilhelm Peterson-Berger: The Doomsday Prophets

Mark Smeaton, English courtier

- Gaetano Donizetti: Anna Bolena

Anna Nicole Smith, American actress and model

- Mark-Anthony Turnage: **Anna Nicole**

Scott Smith, American gay activist

- Stewart Wallace: Harvey Milk

Dame Ethel Smyth, English composer

- Roger Scruton: Violet

Socrates, Greek philosopher

- Georg Philipp Telemann: Der geduldige Sokrates

Solon, Greek philosopher

- Reinhard Keiser: Croesus

Sophonisba, Carthaginian noblewoman, daughter of Hasdrubal Gisco

- Maria Teresa Agnesi Pinottini: **La Sofonisba**
- Francesco Cavalli: Scipione affricano

Agnès Sorel, mistress of King Charles VII of France

- César Cui: The Saracen
- Pyotr Ilyich Tchaikovsky: The Maid of Orleans

Sidney Souers, American admiral and intelligence expert

- Evan Hause: Nightingale: The Last Days of James Forrestal

Edmund Spenser, English poet

- Virgil Thomson: Lord Byron

Arthur Stace, Australian citizen who over 35 years chalked the word "Eternity" over 500,000 times on the footpaths of Sydney

- Jonathan Mills: **The Eternity Man**

Stanisław I Leszczyński, King of the Polish-Lithuanian Commonwealth

- Giuseppe Verdi: Un giorno di regno (being impersonated by the fictional character the Cavaliere di Belfiore)

Stateira, consort of Darius III of Persia

- Francesco Cavalli: **Statira principessa di Persia**

Gertrude Stein, American writer

- Virgil Thomson: The Mother of Us All

King Stephen I of Hungary (St. Stephen)

- Ferenc Erkel: **István király**

Thaddeus Stevens, American politician

- Virgil Thomson: The Mother of Us All

Stigand, Archbishop of Canterbury

- Frederic Hymen Cowen: Harold or the Norman Conquest

Alessandro Stradella, Italian composer

- Friedrich von Flotow: **Alessandro Stradella**
- Louis Niedermeyer: **Stradella**
- at least 2 other operas

Stratonice, wife of Seleucus I Nicator, King of Syria

- Étienne Méhul: **Stratonice**
- Jean-Philippe Rameau: Les fêtes de Polymnie

Johann Strauss I, Viennese waltz composer (father)
Johann Strauss II, Viennese waltz composer (son)

- Johann Strauss I and Johann Strauss II, arr. Erich Wolfgang Korngold and Julius Bittner: Valses de Vienne

Giuseppina Strepponi, operatic soprano

- Lorenzo Ferrero: Risorgimento!

Nikola Šubić Zrinski, Croatian general

- Ivan Zajc: **Nikola Šubić Zrinjski**

Ottoman Sultan Suleiman the Magnificent

- Ernst Krenek: Karl V (as Sultan Soliman)
- Ivan Zajc: Nikola Šubić Zrinjski

Lucius Cornelius Sulla, Roman general and dictator

- George Frideric Handel: **Silla**
- Wolfgang Amadeus Mozart: **Lucio Silla**

Louis Sullivan, American architect

- Daron Hagen: Shining Brow

Sun Yat-sen, Chinese revolutionary leader

- Huang Ruo: Dr. Sun Yat-sen

Henry Howard, Earl of Surrey, English aristocrat, poet

- Camille Saint-Saëns: Henry VIII

Ivan Susanin, Russian folk hero and martyr

- Mikhail Glinka: A Life for the Tsar

King Svatopluk I of Great Moravia

- Eugen Suchoň: **Svätopluk**

King Svatopluk II of Great Moravia

- Eugen Suchoň: Svätopluk

Syphax, king of the Libyan tribe of Masaesyli

- Francesco Cavalli: Scipione affricano (as Siface)

Erzsébet Szilágyi, Hungarian noblewoman, wife of János Hunyadi

- Ferenc Erkel: Hunyadi László

=== T ===
Augusta Tabor, American philanthropist and first wife of Horace Tabor

- Douglas Moore: The Ballad of Baby Doe

Horace Tabor, American businessman, politician

- Douglas Moore: The Ballad of Baby Doe

Alexandre-Antonin Taché, Canadian Catholic prelate

- Harry Somers: Louis Riel

Rabindranath Tagore, Indian writer

- Philip Glass: Satyagraha

Eugene Talmadge, Governor of Georgia

- Michael Braz: A Scholar Under Siege

Tamerlane: see Timur

Tancred, Prince of Galilee, Norman Crusade leader

- André Campra: **Tancrède**

Tannhäuser, Medieval German poet

- Richard Wagner: **Tannhäuser**

Lucius Tarquinius, one of 3 kings of Rome

- Filippo Amadei, Giovanni Bononcini and George Frideric Handel: Muzio Scevola

Sextus Tarquinius, son of Lucius Tarquinius Superbus, King of Rome

- Benjamin Britten: The Rape of Lucretia

Torquato Tasso, Italian poet

- Gaetano Donizetti: **Torquato Tasso**

John Taverner, 16th century English composer

- Sir Peter Maxwell Davies: **Taverner**

Dame Elizabeth Taylor, British-US actress

- Michael Daugherty: Jackie O

William Tell, Swiss national hero (disputed historical authenticity)

- Ramon Carnicer: **Guglielmo Tell**
- André Grétry: **Guillaume Tell**
- Gioachino Rossini: **Guillaume Tell**

Edward Teller, Hungarian-American physicist

- John Adams: Doctor Atomic

Beatrice di Tenda, Italian noblewoman

- Vincenzo Bellini: **Beatrice di Tenda**

Saint Teresa of Ávila, Spanish mystic and theologian

- Virgil Thomson: Four Saints in Three Acts

Nikola Tesla, Serbian American inventor

- Constantine Koukias: **Tesla - Lightning in His Hand**

Themistocles, Athenian general and politician

- Johann Christian Bach: **Temistocle**
- Josep Duran: Temistocle

James Thomson, Scottish poet

- Virgil Thomson: Lord Byron

Virgil Thomson, American composer and critic

- Virgil Thomson: The Mother of Us All

François Auguste de Thou, French magistrate

- Charles Gounod: Cinq-Mars

Thusnelda, wife of Arminius

- George Frideric Handel: Arminio

Tigranes the Great, Emperor of Armenia

- Tomaso Albinoni: **Tigrane, re d'Armenia**

Timur, aka Tamerlane, founder of the Timurid dynasty

- Iain Hamilton: **Tamberlaine**
- George Frideric Handel: **Tamerlano**
- Antonio Sacchini: **Tamerlano**
- Antonio Vivaldi: Bajazet

King Tiridates I of Armenia

- Reinhard Keiser: Octavia

Emperor Titus of Rome

- Antonio Caldara: **La clemenza di Tito**
- Christoph Willibald Gluck: **La clemenza di Tito**
- Wolfgang Amadeus Mozart: **La clemenza di Tito**
- Josef Mysliveček: **La clemenza di Tito**
- and settings of La clemenza di Tito by about 40 other composers

Tiye, mother of Pharaoh Akhenaten of Egypt

- Philip Glass: Akhnaten

Leo Tolstoy, Russian novelist

- Philip Glass: Satyagraha

Tomyris, Queen of the Massagetae

- Alessandro Scarlatti: Tigrane (as Tomiri)

Titus Manlius Torquatus, Roman dictator

- Antonio Vivaldi: **Tito Manlio**

François Leclerc du Tremblay, "Père Joseph", the original eminence grise

- Charles Gounod: Cinq-Mars

Georges de la Trémoille, French soldier, favourite of Charles VII

- Walter Braunfels: Szenen aus dem Leben der Heiligen Johanna

Olegas Truchanas, Lithuanian-Australian wilderness photographer

- Constantine Koukias: **Olegas**

Pierre Trudeau, Prime Minister of Canada

- Alexina Louie: Mulroney: The Opera

Harry S. Truman, American President

- Evan Hause: Nightingale: The Last Days of James Forrestal

Marina Tsvetaeva, Russian poet

- Nikolai Korndorf: MR (**Marina** and Rainer)

Harriet Tubman, American abolitionist and former slave

- Thea Musgrave: **Harriet, the Woman Called Moses**

John Turner, Prime Minister of Canada

- Alexina Louie: Mulroney: The Opera

Wat Tyler, English leader of peasant revolution

- Alan Bush: **Wat Tyler**

=== U-V ===
Pope Urban VIII

- Philip Glass: Galileo Galilei (appears as both Cardinal Maffeo Barberini and Pope Urban VIII)

Valdemar IV of Denmark, King of Denmark from 1340 to 1375

- Andreas Hallén: Valdemarskatten

Valentinian III, Western Roman Emperor

- George Frideric Handel: Ezio

Mariano Guadalupe Vallejo, Californio general, statesman

- David Conte: The Dreamers

Martin van Buren, 8th American President

- Anthony Davis, Amistad

Theo van Gogh, Dutch art dealer, brother of Vincent van Gogh

- Einojuhani Rautavaara: Vincent
- James Wilson: **Letters to Theo**

Vincent van Gogh, Dutch painter

- Nevit Kodallı: **Van Gogh**
- Einojuhani Rautavaara: **Vincent**
- James Wilson: Letters to Theo
- Christopher Yavelow: **The Passion of Vincent van Gogh**

Publius Quinctilius Varus, Roman general

- George Frideric Handel: Arminio

Tsar Vasily IV (Shuisky) of Russia

- Antonín Dvořák: Dimitrij
- Modest Mussorgsky: Boris Godunov

Giuseppe Verdi, Italian composer

- Lorenzo Ferrero: Risorgimento!
- Adriana Hölszky: Giuseppe e Sylvia (2000)

Johannes Vermeer, Dutch painter

- Sir Harrison Birtwistle: The Second Mrs Kong

Lucius Verus: see Vologases IV

Micaela Villegas, "La Perricholi", Peruvian actress and singer

- Jacques Offenbach: **La Périchole** (she is not identified by name, and the remaining characters are all fictional)

François Villon, French poet and vagabond

- George Antheil and Ezra Pound: Le Testament
- Rudolf Friml: **The Vagabond King**

Francesc de Vinatea, Valencian nobleman, opposed to Alfonso IV of Aragon

- Matilde Salvador i Segarra: **Vinatea**

Gaius Iulius Vindex, Roman general

- Anton Rubinstein: Neron

Filippo Maria Visconti, ruler of Milan, husband of Beatrice di Tenda

- Vincenzo Bellini: Beatrice di Tenda

Vladimir I "the Great", Grand Prince of Kiev

- Alexander Serov: **Rogneda**

Vladimir III Igorevich, Prince of Putivl and Halych
Vladimir Yaroslavich, Prince Galitsky, son of Yaroslav Osmomysl, Prince of Halych

- Alexander Borodin: Prince Igor

Vologases IV, king of Parthia

- Girolamo Abos: Lucio Vero, ossia, Il Vologeso

Voltaire, French writer

- Leonard Bernstein: Candide

=== W ===
Jacob Wallenberg, Swedish banker
Raoul Wallenberg, Swedish diplomat who rescued many Jews

- Erkki-Sven Tüür: **Wallenberg**

Konrad von Wallenrode, Grand Master of the Teutonic Knights

- Amilcare Ponchielli: I Lituani (the character Walter is impersonating Wallenrode, referred to in the opera as "Corrado Wallenrod")

Albrecht von Wallenstein, Bohemian military commander

- August Ritter von Adelburg: **Wallenstein**
- Paul Hindemith: Die Harmonie der Welt

Francis Walsingham, English royal adviser, spymaster

- Rufus Norris and Damon Albarn: Dr Dee: An English Opera

Walther von der Vogelweide, Medieval German poet

- Richard Wagner: Tannhäuser

Princess Wanda, legendary Polish queen

- Antonín Dvořák: **Vanda**
- Max Vogrich: **Vanda**

Andy Warhol, American artist

- Michael Daugherty: Jackie O

Booker T. Washington, American educator & civil rights leader

- Scott Joplin: **A Guest of Honor**

Daniel Webster, American statesman

- Douglas Moore: The Devil and **Daniel Webster**
- Virgil Thomson: The Mother of Us All

Dan White, American politician, assassin of George Moscone and Harvey Milk

- Stewart Wallace: Harvey Milk

George Hunter White, American CIA operative

- Evan Hause: Man: Biology of a Fall

Patrick White, Australian novelist

- Elena Kats-Chernin: Whiteley (2019)

Brett Whiteley, Australian painter
Wendy Whiteley, his muse and sometime wife
Arkie Whiteley, their daughter

- Elena Kats-Chernin: **Whiteley** (2019)

Walt Whitman

- Theodore Morrison: Oscar
- Alberto Garcia Demestres: **WOW!**

Oscar Wilde, Irish writer

- Theodore Morrison: **Oscar**
- Alberto Garcia Demestres: **WOW!**

Queen Wilhelmina of the Netherlands

- Gavin Bryars, Philip Glass and others: The Civil Wars: A Tree Is Best Measured When It Is Down

William the Conqueror (King William I of England)

- Frederic Hymen Cowen: Harold or the Norman Conquest (as William, Duke of Normandy)

William the Silent (William I, Prince of Orange)

- Gavin Bryars, Philip Glass and others: The Civil Wars: A Tree Is Best Measured When It Is Down

Sir Alfred Wills, English judge

- Theodore Morrison: Oscar

Robert R. Wilson, American physicist

- John Adams: Doctor Atomic

Władysław I the Elbow-high (aka Ladislaus I), King of Poland 1320-33

- Józef Elsner: Król Łokietek

Wolfram von Eschenbach, Medieval German poet

- Richard Wagner: Tannhäuser

Thomas Wolsey, English cardinal

- Sir Peter Maxwell Davies: Taverner (not identified as such)

Frank Lloyd Wright, American architect
Catherine "Kitty" (Tobin) Wright (1871–1959), American socialite, social worker, first wife of Frank Lloyd Wright

- Daron Hagen: Shining Brow

Samuel Joseph Wurzelbacher, aka "Joe the Plumber", American plumber, television celebrity

- Curtis K. Hughes: Say It Ain't So, Joe

=== X-Y ===
Malcolm X, African-American human rights activist

- Anthony Davis: **X – The Life and Times of Malcolm X**

Xerxes I "the Great," king of Persia

- Johann Christian Bach: Temistocle
- Giovanni Bononcini: **Xerse**
- Francesco Cavalli: **Xerse**
- George Frideric Handel: **Serse**
- Hugo Weisgall: Esther

Xiphares, son of Mithridates VI of Pontus

- Wolfgang Amadeus Mozart: Mitridate, re di Ponto

Yaghi-Siyan, Governor of Antioch

- Giuseppe Verdi: I Lombardi alla prima crociata (as Acciano)

Ōtomo no Yakamochi, Japanese poet, diplomat

- Nikolai Korndorf: MR (Marina and Rainer)

Ralph Yarborough, American politician

- David T. Little: JFK

Yaroslav I the Wise, Grand Prince of Kiev

- Heorhiy Maiboroda: **Yaroslav Mudriy**

Aleksey Petrovich Yermolov, Russian general

- Sergei Prokofiev: War and Peace

Yuri II, Grand Prince of Vladimir

- Nikolai Rimsky-Korsakov: The Legend of the Invisible City of Kitezh and the Maiden Fevroniya

=== Z ===
Emiliano Zapata, Mexican leader

- Leonardo Balada: **Zapata**

Zeno, Byzantine emperor

- Tomaso Albinoni: Zenone, imperator d'Oriente

Zenobia, Queen of the Palmyrene Empire

- Tomaso Albinoni: Zenobia, regina de Palmireni
- Gioachino Rossini: Aureliano in Palmira

Zhou Enlai, Chinese political leader

- John Adams: Nixon in China (as Chou En-lai)

Zoroaster

- Jean-Philippe Rameau: **Zoroastre**

Venerable Zosimas of Palestine

- Ottorino Respighi: Maria egiziaca (as Abbot Zosimus)

Nikola Šubić Zrinski: see Šubić Zrinski

== See also ==
- List of historical ballet characters
