= Jefferson & Poe: A Lyric Opera =

Opera by Damon Ferrante

Jefferson & Poe is a lyric opera in two acts with music by Damon Ferrante and libretto by Daniel Mark Epstein.

== Storyline ==
The opera takes place at Monticello on a March evening in the early nineteenth century and portrays two love stories: one between an elderly Thomas Jefferson and Sally Hemings and the other between a young Edgar Allan Poe and the daughter of Jefferson and Hemings.

== Awards ==
The work received its premiere at Theatre Project in Baltimore and at Symphony Space in Manhattan in 2005.
