= Kaiserin Josephine =

1936 operetta by Emmerich Kálmán

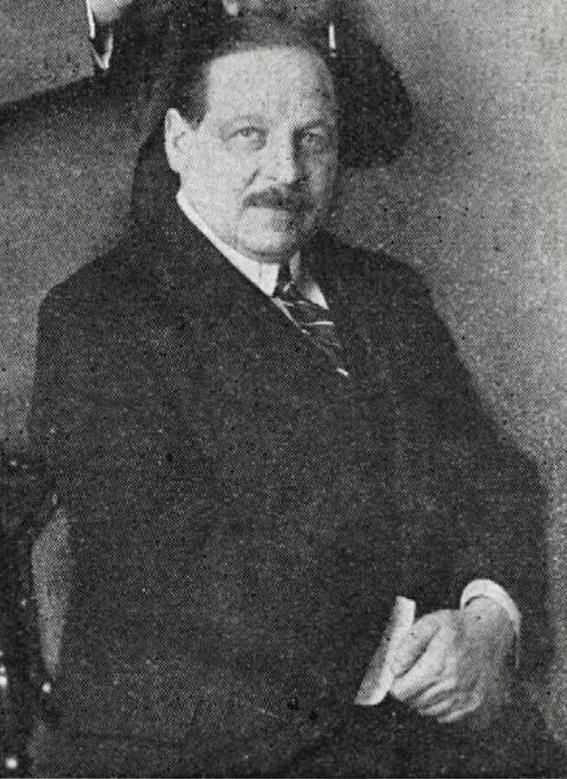
Emmerich Kálmán

Kaiserin Josephine is an operetta in 8 scenes by Hungarian composer Emmerich Kálmán. The German libretto was by Paul Knepler and Géza Herczeg. It premiered in Zürich, at the municipal theatre, on 18 January 1936.

== Roles ==
Role	Voice type	Premiere Cast, January 18, 1936 (Conductor: Victor Reinshagen)
Duchess of Aiguillon	soprano	
Joséphine de Beauharnais	soprano	Paola Brosig
Napoleon Bonaparte	tenor	Heinz Rhoeden

== Plot ==
The plot focuses on the trials of the relationship between the Emperor Napoleon I and his first wife Joséphine de Beauharnais. The opera begins with a fortune teller's prophecy that Joséphine will one day become empress. In the second tableau, General Napoleon and Joséphine meet for the first time at a reception. Napoleon is immediately attracted to her, but she pays no attention to him. In the third tableau, Eugène, Joséphine's son from her first marriage, is imprisoned for a minor crime, whereupon Joséphine pleads with Napoleon to have him released. The general takes advantage of this and asks Joséphine to come to him and personally request Eugène's release. This plan works, and in the fourth tableau, the two are wed. Napoleon then returns to his troops in the field, while Joséphine enjoys a social life in Paris, and fails to respond to a request from Napoleon to come to him. Instead, she flirts with other men, including Hippolyte Charles. Eventually, Joséphine travels to see Napoleon. The general refuses her request to promote Hippolyte's career. Instead, out of jealousy, he is portrayed as a coward and falls in reputation. In the seventh tableau, Napoleon has become France's first consul. At first, he is distant from Joséphine out of irritation, but then the couple find their way back together. The final tableau presents the coronation of Napoleon and Joséphine. The prophecy of the soothsayer has thus come true, and the operetta ends happily.
