= Edwin Penhorwood =

American composer (born 1939)

Edwin Penhorwood (born 1939) is an American composer who is an assistant professor at the Jacobs School of Music at Indiana University.

== Biography ==
Penhorwood is a native of Toledo, Ohio, and studied music at the University of Iowa. He has taught at the International School of Zurich, Switzerland, at the Church Music Conservatory in Berlin, the University of Missouri, and Indiana University, and has accompanied singers and instrumentalists in North America and in Europe for many years. Penhorwood joined the faculty of Indiana University in 1993. He is the musical director of the Graduate Opera Workshop and has taught Accompanying.

Penhorwood is the composer of many choral and vocal compositions. Penhorwood's songs have been broadcast by NPR, the Paris and Berlin radio networks and have been featured at Glimmerglass Opera, The Chautauqua Opera, the National NATS Convention, and Marilyn Horne's 70th Birthday Celebration. In 1999, the Indianapolis Symphonic Chorus, through the Lilly Foundation, presented Penhorwood with a commission for a choral work, The Christmas Story. Penhorwood's compositions have been published by Carl Fischer, Abingdon, Hinshaw Music, and T.I.S. Publications. In 2000, T.I.S., Inc. published his songs and song cycles.

ECS Publishing published Penhorwood's comic opera Too Many Sopranos, commissioned by the Cedar Rapids Opera Theatre and premiered in June 2000. The opera, now in its fifth printing, has been presented at the NATS Convention and The National Opera Association National Convention in New York City. It has received over 80 productions, most recently at The Baltimore Opera and Light Opera Oklahoma. In March 2008, the Hunter College Opera staged a new production of the opera, performed at the Danny Kaye Playhouse in New York City.

Penhorwood has edited two volumes of Vincenzo Righini's vocal works for Southern Music. Many of these compositions received their American premières at the 2nd International Congress of Voice Teachers held in Philadelphia.

He is married to soprano Costanza Cuccaro.
