= Damon Ferrante =

American composer

Damon Ferrante is an American composer whose works have been performed in concert halls and performance venues throughout North America, most notably, Carnegie Hall, Symphony Space, Guild Hall, and Theatre Project.

His opera, Jefferson & Poe, (with librettist Daniel Mark Epstein), received its premiere in 2005 at Symphony Space in Manhattan. His song cycle, The Mountain & Tidewater Songs (also on texts by Epstein), has been performed throughout the United States (including Carnegie Hall) since 2006.

== Critical Reaction ==
Tim Smith of The Baltimore Sun calls Ferrante's music "focused and colorful...with an unexpected, decidedly poetic touch".

Geoffrey Himes of Baltimore City Paper states, "If the tune has the elegance of traditional opera, the harmonization is very modern as the vocal lines climb and descend the melodic staircases that Ferrante has constructed for them".

Anne Midgette, writing in The New York Times on Friday, December 2, 2005, cited Ferrante's opera Jefferson and Poe as one of the three operas to see in New York in early December; the two other operas listed were productions of La bohème and Carmen at the Metropolitan Opera.

== Selected works ==
- Jefferson & Poe: A Lyric Opera in Two Acts
- Super Double Lite: An Opera in Two Acts
- Toward Home: An Evening Length Work for Modern Dance
- The Mountain and Tidewater Songs: A Song Cycle for Baritone and Piano Trio
- Snow Moon: A Piano Sonata
- Dreaming Cities: A Piano Trio
- Guitar Concerto
- The Footbridge: A Guitar Duo
- From Out of Air: Songs for Soprano and Piano
