= Être Dieu =

Opera by Salvador Dalí

Être Dieu: opéra-poème, audiovisuel et cathare en six parties (French for "Being God: a Cathar Audiovisual Opera-Poem in Six Parts") is a self-proclaimed "opera-poem" written by Spanish surrealist painter Salvador Dalí, based on a libretto by Manuel Vázquez Montalbán, with music by French avant-garde musician Igor Wakhévitch. It was originally published in 1985.

The six-part work features Dalí as God, Brigitte Bardot as an artichoke and Catherine the Great and Marilyn Monroe do a striptease. It has been published in an extremely rare 3 LP box-set by a Spanish label. It was re-released in a regular 3CD box published by German-label Eurostar who subsequently went out of business, and there are few-to-no known performances of the work. Dalí painted "Self-Portrait" (1972) to mark the composition of the opera, which was later auctioned by the United States Customs Service after being seized after Colombian drug lords tried to use the painting to launder money.

Tracklist:

A. Ouverture Et Première Entrée 22:12

B. Deuxième Entrée Ou La Lutte Avec L'Ange 22:12

C. Troisième Entrée Et Première Sortie 24:25

D. Le Rêve Passe 23:33

E. Quatrième Entrée Ou La Profession De Foi 27:42

F. Final Et Seconde Sortie 25:00

Credits

- Composed By – Igor Wakhévitch, M. Vázquez Montalban*, Pierre Delabre, Salvador Dalí
- Conductor – Boris de Vinogradow
- Drums – François Auger
- Electric Bass – Didier Batard
- Electric Guitar – J.J. Flety*, J.P. Castelain*
- Engineer – Claude Wagner
- Engineer [Assistant] – A. Robert Bourdet*
- Orchestra – Ensemble Polyphonique De Paris Et Orchestre*
- Painting [Insert] – Salvador Dalí
- Percussion [Solo] – Sylvio Gualda
- Soprano Vocals – Eve Brenner
- Synthesizer – Igor Wakhévitch
- Violin [Electric] – M. Ripoche*
- Voice Actor [El Divino Dalí] – Salvador Dalí
- Voice Actor [El Narrador Y El Recitador] – Didier Haudepin
- Voice Actor [El Ángel] – Alain Cuny
- Voice Actor [El] – Raymond Gérôme
- Voice Actor [Ella] – Delphine Seyrig
- Voice Actor [La Narradora] – Catherine Allegret

Recorded at Pathé Marconi studios, Boulogne, France.

== See also ==
- List of works by Salvador Dalí
