= MR (Marina and Rainer) =

The correspondence between Rilke and Tsvetaeva, in German, Insel, 1992 ISBN 3-458-16336-0

MR (Marina and Rainer) is a chamber opera in one act (5 scenes) by the Russian composer Nikolai Korndorf (1947–2001). The libretto by Yuri Lourié is in Russian, German, Ancient Greek and Japanese). Commissioned by the Munich Biennial, Germany, it was composed in 1989.

== Premiere ==
The first performance was on May 20, 1994, at the Muffathalle in Munich, Germany, with the Munich Biennial Singers, Ulm Orchestra, and S. Bachli, conductor.

== Structure ==
The opera consists of five scenes:

- 1. Tsvetayeva and Rilke
- 2. Sapho and Alcaeus
- 3. Tsvetayeva and Rilke again
- 4. Yakamochi and Sakanoue
- 5. Tsvetayeva and Rilke again.

== Roles ==
- Marina
- Rainer
- Sapho
- Alcaeus
- Yakamochi
- Sakanoue

Three pantomime actors symbolizing the illness and fate as well as the poets’ relations in a real life.

== Plot ==
This is a moving story told in letters between two great poets, the Russian Marina Tsvetaeva and the Austrian Rainer Maria Rilke. They never met but their fiery relationship lasted for several months. At that time Rilke was severely ill with leukaemia and had already not written for two years. However the letters of Tsvetaeva returned him to poetry. The love of Tsvetayeva for Rilke's poetry grew to the love of him as a person. She was ready to come and meet him in real life, but when her last letter to him was written, Rilke was already dead. As a background to this story, two other pairs of poets were added: the Ancient Greek poets Sapho and Alcaeus, and the 8th-century Japanese poets Otomo no Yakamochi and Lady Otomo no Sakanoue.

== Scoring ==
- Singers: soprano, coloratura soprano, contralto, tenor, baritone, bass, 3 pantomime actors
- Orchestra: Flute (= piccolo, basso, flauto dolce soprano), oboe, 2 clarinets (I = piccolo, alt saxophone; II = bass clarinet), bassoon, 1(= contrabassoon), 2 horns, trumpet, trombone, percussion 2 players, harp, celesta (= cembalo), piano I prepared (= piano II normal), electric guitar (= bass guitar) 2 violins, viola, cello and double bass.

Duration = 90 minutes

== Bibliography ==
- Baker's Biographical Dictionary of Musicians, 7th edition, Schirmer books, A Division of Macmillan, Inc. New York. Maxwell MacMillan, Canada, Toronto, 1984. 8th edition, 1992.
- Contemporary Composers, St. James Press, Chicago, London, 1992.
- Kuzina, Olga: Nikolai Korndorf. Kompozitory Moskvy (Moscow’s Composers), 4th issue, Moscow, Kompozitor, 1994. pp. 142–165 (in Russian).
- Guljanitskaja, Natalia: On the style of contemporary spiritual musical compositions, Musykalnaya Arademi' No. 1, 1994. pp. 18–25 (in Russian).
- Dubinets, Elena: In memory of Nikolai Korndorf, Musykalnaya Arademia, 2002, No. 2 (see also the link below)
