= The Doomsday Prophets =

The Doomsday Prophets (Swedish: Domedagsprofeterna) is an opera by Wilhelm Peterson-Berger, to his own Swedish libretto, composed from 1912–17. It was first performed at the Royal Opera, Stockholm on 21 February 1919.

== Background ==
Based on a story which the composer found in the journal Den svenska Mercurius (1759), the opera features several historical characters (Bure, Skytte, Queen Kristina), and is set in the university city of Uppsala just before the end of the Thirty Years' War in which Sweden became a major European power. The war increased people's worries about the end of the world and two academics claim to have calculated when Doomsday will take place. The opera's composition was completed during the First World War.
The first performance was conducted by Armas Järnefelt.

== Roles ==
- Captain Lennart Sporre
- Elin, daughter of Klas Mugg
- Lars Bryngelsson, student, sweetheart of Elin
- Klas Mugg, Elin's father
- Östen, brother of Lars
- Johan Bure, professor
- Simon Wolimhaus, apothecary
- Rector Magnificus
- Queen Kristina of Sweden
- Bengt Skytte, a noble, governor of Uppsala
- Fru Kerstin
- Görvel Mårdh, Captain Sporre's beloved
- Johan Papegoja
- Brita, aunt of Elin
- Emerentia, daughter of Brita
- Måns Korck, noble student
- Johan Stjernadler, noble student
- Göran Sperling, noble student
- Arvid Ribbing, noble student
- Professors, students

== Synopsis ==
- Act 1

The Muggen Inn in Uppsala on 27 May 1647. Due to a wager between the university don Johan Bure and Queen Kristina's apothecary Simon Wolimhaus, as to when the world will end (which the professor seems to be fated to lose), the innkeeper, Klas Mugg, and his daughter, Elin, look set to lose their home. Elin is in love with the studious but poor Lars, who is bullied by the 'nobler' students. (Lars's aunt is also trying to match him with her own daughter.) Lars gets arrested for threatening his tormentors with Johan Papegoja's pistol and is arraigned in front of a university tribunal, which could result in him being expelled.

- Act 2

Outside Uppsala cathedral. With Lars afraid for his future and marriage to Elin, army captain Lennart Sporre convinces Klas to let Elin marry Lars, in return for upsetting the wager, which he does by setting fire to Wolimhaus' dog kennel (this invalidates the terms of the wager as the fire devalues the latter's effects) under cover of a thunderstorm. He argues with the university officials that passing judgment on Lars when the end of the world is nigh is pointless. They ignore this and proceed to condemn Lars, but when the fire is discovered, he escapes during the tumult.

- Act 3

On Uppsala Castle Hill. Lars is now in despair, wondering whether he should enlist in the army or emigrate. Sporre and the noble students sing a serenade to Görvel and city musicians assemble in the castle tower to welcome the queen. Sporre explains that the wager is no longer valid as the value of the properties has changed because of the fire (as he planned). As the brass blare out, Wolimhaus believes the Doomsday has arrived, but it is the Queen's arrival and acclaim from the crowd. Lars is pardoned, is able to marry Elin and Sporre gets his beloved Görvel. The two prophets are left confounded.
