= Il Cid della Spagna =

1802 opera by Giuseppe Farinelli

Il Cid della Spagna is a dramma per musica or opera in 2 acts by composer Giuseppe Farinelli. The work uses an Italian language libretto by Antonio Simeone Sografi that is based on Pierre Corneille's 1636 play Le Cid. The work premiered at La Fenice in Venice on 17 February 1802 in a double bill with Giuseppe Antonio Capuzzi's ballet Alessio di Wiarka.

== Roles ==
Role	Voice type	Premiere cast, 17 February 1802 (Conductor:)
Don Rodrigo (Cid)	tenor	Vitale Damiani
Climene	soprano	Zenaide Bulloni
Don Fernando	sopranista	Vincenzo Bartolini
Don Alonso	bass	Giovanni Battista Zanardi
Elvira	soprano	Chiara Cicerelli
Count Gormas	tenor	Giuseppe Bertani
Don Diego	tenor	Gaetano Crivelli
