= Max Vogrich =

Austrian pianist and composer (1852–1916)

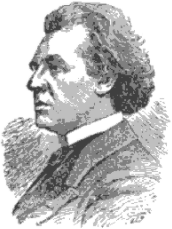
- Born: 24 January 1852; Hermannstadt, Transylvania
- Died: 10 June 1916 (aged 64); New York City
- Occupations: Pianist, composer

Max Wilhelm Carl Vogrich (24 January 1852 – 10 June 1916) was an Austrian pianist and composer. His most popular pieces are the "Passpied", "Staccato Caprice", and "Valse Brilliante".

== Life ==
Max Vogrich was born in Hermannstadt, Transylvania (now Sibiu, Romania) on 24 January 1852. A childhood prodigy, he was an acclaimed pianist at the age of 14 years. He studied at Leipzig under Carl Reinecke, Hans Richter, Moritz Hauptmann, and Ignaz Moscheles, completing the studies in 1869. From 1870 to 1878 he was engaged in concert tours throughout continental Europe, South America, and the United States. From 1882 to 1886 he was engaged in concert tours and teaching in Australia, after which he went to New York City, where he lived for some time. He died at Post Graduate Hospital there on 10 June 1916.

His works include the operas Vanda (1875), Lanzelot (1890), King Arthur (1893), and Buddha (1904); an oratorio, The Captivity (1891); the cantatas The Young King and the Sheperdess and The Diver; several masses, symphonies, violin and pianoforte concertos, and sonatas, besides duets, songs, and chamber music.
