= Augusta Symphony Orchestra =

Augusta Symphony Orchestra (ASO)
- Orchestra
- Founded: 1919
- Principal conductor: Jinwook Park
- Website: www.augustasymphonymaine.org

The Augusta Symphony Orchestra, established shortly after World War I, is a nonprofit symphony orchestra in Augusta, Maine. It consists of fifty volunteer amateur and semi-professional musicians and is conducted by Jinwook Park. The orchestra's season includes concerts in spring and fall.
