= Lord Byron (opera) =

Opera by Virgil Thomson

Lord Byron is an opera in three acts by Virgil Thomson to an original English libretto by Jack Larson, inspired by the life of the British poet Lord Byron. This was Thomson's third and final opera. He wrote it on commission from the Ford Foundation for the Metropolitan Opera (Met), but the Met never produced the opera. The first performance was at Lincoln Center, New York City on April 20, 1972, by the music department of the Juilliard School with John Houseman as stage director, Gerhard Samuel as the conductor and Alvin Ailey as the choreographer. A performance of a revised version, by the composer, took place in 1985 with the New York Opera Repertory Theater.

The composer himself had great affection for this opera. The premiere production received mixed reviews, with one particularly negative from Harold C. Schonberg, including this description:

...a very bland score, distressingly banal (all those waltzes!) and frequently gaggingly cutesy.

The opera has not yet received a full-scale professional production. Monadnock Music performed the opera in September 1991.

== Synopsis ==
The opera is set in London from 1812 to 1824.

In the nave of Westminster Abbey, Lord Byron's friends, wife and sister have arrived to present a statue of Lord Byron to the Dean of the Abbey, and to lobby for the poet's burial there. They learn that Byron had written his memoirs, which causes them concern for his reputation. The statue of Byron arrives, which sets off memories in the minds of Byron's relations and friends. These include the courtship of Byron with his future wife. However, the memories also include that Byron committed incest with his half-sister Augusta Leigh and fathered her daughter, which led to Byron's self-exile and Byron's wife insisting that he must never see Augusta again. While they have not read Byron's own manuscript, their memories cause enough fear that they burn the memoirs. The Dean of the Abbey arrives, and upon learning that the relatives considered Byron's memoirs unfit for reading, he denies permission to have Byron buried in Westminster Abbey. At the end of the opera, the shades of the poets in the Abbey's Poets' Corner welcome Byron among them.

== Recording ==
- Koch: Matthew Lord, Jeanne Ommerle, D'Anna Fortunato, Richard Zeller, Richard Johnson, Gregory Mason, Stephen Owen, Adrienne Csgenery, Thomas Woodman, Louisa Jonason, Donald Collup, David Murray, Jorg Westerkemp, Martin Kelley, Ted Whalen, John Holyoke, David Stoneman, Debra Vanderlinde, Marion Dry; Monadnock Festival Orchestra and Chorus; James Bolle, conductor

In addition, excerpts from the opera, called "Five Tenor Songs from Lord Byron", have been recorded, with the following artists: Martyn Hill, tenor; Budapest Symphony Orchestra; James Bolle, conductor.
