= Melchior Ernst Sachs =

German composer

Johann Melchior Ernst Sachs (28 February 1843 – 18 May 1917) was a German romantic composer, who also held teaching and performing posts.

He studied first at Altdorf Seminary; taught in elementary schools from 1861 to 1863, and later entered the Munich College of Music and remained there from 1863 to 1865, before becoming a pupil there under Joseph Rheinberger, from 1867 to 1869, when it re-opened as the Royal Bavarian Music School, under the overall direction of Hans von Bülow.

Sachs conducted the Liederkranz Society from 1868 to 1872, and in 1871 was appointed a teacher of harmony at the Royal Music School. From 1869 until 1873 he conducted a male choral society at Munich, and he was the founder and conductor of the Tonkunstlerverein.

As a music theorist he held original opinions on many points. Most of his numerous compositions remain unpublished, but his work includes symphonies; symphonic poems; an opera, Palestrina, which was performed at Ratisbon in 1886; a ballad, Das Thal des Espingo, for chorus and orchestra; a "Pater Noster"; and one work of gigantic dimensions, Kains Schuld und ihre Sühne (Cain, His Sin and Atonement). This production was intended to fill seven evenings. He also composed many songs, and much piano music.

== Selected works ==
- 8 Mädchenlieder (text: Paul Heyse) for soprano and piano, Op. 6
- 3 Stimmungsbilder, for piano, Op. 11
- Waldbächleins Thalfahrt, etude for piano, Op. 12
- 2 Gesänge, Op. 14
- Palestrina, opera
- Kains Schuld und ihre Sühne (Cain, His Sin and Atonement)
- Bethanien (text: Luise Hitz), cantata a for female soloist, chorus, piano and string orchestra
