= Harold or the Norman Conquest =

Opera

Harold, or the Norman Conquest is an opera in four acts with music by the British composer Frederic H. Cowen with a libretto by Edward Malet, edited by Frederic Edward Weatherly, adapted into the German by L.A. Caumont, and first performed at Covent Garden, London on 8 June 1895.

== Synopsis ==
=== Act 1. ===
In a hall in Alfnoth's castle, Alfnoth and his men return from hunting, and Edith, Alfnoth's daughter, comes out to greet her father. Harold, Earl Godwin's son, who had joined the hunting party uninvited to gain access to Edith, with whom he is in love (and her with him), disguised as an outlaw (as he had been banished from the kingdom), and who had brought down a deer with a bow and arrow at five hundred yards, is brought in. Edith already has an inkling of his true identity. Alfnoth, now seems to recognise Harold also, and agrees to keep his identity secret in return for Harold's services as a bowman.

William, the Duke of Normandy, arrives at the castle. His entourage is greeted, and Edith is presented to him. William Malet, a member of the Duke's retinue, recognises Harold, but does not let on to the Duke. The women of the castle enter and sing and dance before the Duke. Harold interjects with a song of love, directed at Edith. The Duke responds with a song of a legend of Normandy, that the sword, not love, shall win him a land. Armed soldiers of King Edward the Confessor, led by Siward, enter in an attempt to arrest Harold. Malet, realising that Harold may become king when Edward dies, schemes with Duke William. Edith pleads with her father not to let them take him. As Siward's soldiers advance to arrest him, Duke William interposes claiming that Harold is his friend and will be returning to Normandy with him. Duke William and Alfnoth, with their men, escort Harold away, overpowering Siward's men. Duke William, Malet and Harold travel to Normandy.

=== Act 2. ===
In a bower in the Duke of Normandy's garden at Bayeux Princess Adela and her maidens are singing and wreathing flowers. Harold enters the garden and seeing the princess plans to pretend to love her in order to seek his freedom, praying that Edith, his true love, forgive him. Adela has also made a promise to her father to entrap Harold into loving her, knowing full well that he still loves Edith. Harold finally falls on his knees and kisses her with feigned passion. Malet and Duke William arrive, and seeing that Adela is carrying out her father's wishes, tell Harold that King Edward had bequeathed the crown to William. Indeed, if he helps him, Harold shall be his second in command, and receive Adela's hand in marriage. Harold agrees, but William tells him that he must swear a solemn oath that night. They depart leaving Harold to ponder what he has done.

That evening in the interior of Bayeux Cathedral, prayers and singing prelude the procession of an ark covered in a pall carried by monks. Once placed centre stage, they leave and Duke William enters proclaiming his ambitions. Shortly after the Bishop and monks enter followed by Adela, Harold, Malet, ladies and knights. William encourages an unwilling Harold to swear to help him to the crown of England. Finally Harold swears an oath swearing to uphold William's and help him in his endeavours, subject to William's word that Edward had bequeathed the crown to him. The monks reverently lift the pall from the ark to reveal a jewelled skeleton of a saint. The throng acknowledge that Harold had been bound by his sacred oath. A messenger enters announcing that King Edward is near to death. Duke William commands that they must return to England at once. Harold realises all too clearly what he has done, but William reminds him of that which he has sworn.

=== Act 3. ===
Men and women are gathered around the exterior of Westminster Hall, while a bell tolls. Some chat about the succession to the throne, which is uncertain, but favour Harold. Edith enters, thinking that Harold no longer loves her, but pledging her life to him and England. Edith enters the hall as the funeral procession of King Edward comes out of the Hall on its way to Westminster Abbey, accompanied by Archbishop Stigand and Saxon Nobles. As the coffin reaches centre stage Harold enters hurriedly. Stigand does not recognise him and challenges him, but on identifying him praises God for his return. However, Harold tells Stigand of his oath to help William to the throne. Stigand, realising that Edward had made no such promise to give William the crown, tells Harold that William had lied, and that he was, therefore, free of the oath. The Archbishop pronounces Harold King and absolves him of the oath he swore. Harold cannot yet decide and Stigand says he will continue with the funeral and seek his answer afterwards. The procession passes into the Abbey.

Harold finally concedes to his destiny and pledges his life to England. Edith comes out of the Hall and watches Harold despondently. Edith calls to Harold and he rushes towards her, but she waves him back sadly. She bids him farewell, saying that she knows he loves another. He responds that he had been duped by William and Adela. He swears his love for Edith, who is surprised, but replies that it is too late, as she had committed herself to the church in vows given on her father's deathbed, thinking that Harold was betrothed to another. They both look to heaven seeking release from their sorrows. Edith says to Harold that he should accept the crown, but he says he will not, if he is to lose her. Edith asks Harold to promise her that he will take the crown, and with sad resolve replies ‘your will, not mine’. Edith says farewell, kisses him on the forehead, turns slowly and ascends into the Hall.

Stigand, nobles and people come out of the Abbey seeking his decision. Malet enters suddenly proclaiming the Duke William is King. Stigand says William's claim is false and that he has absolved Harold of his oath. Malet claims that the Pope has revoked Stigand's power. This enrages the noblemen and people, and they are about to rush Malet when Harold interposes stating that he is now King. The people rejoice. Malet throws down the gauntlet claiming England for Normandy and William. Harold takes up the gauntlet, telling Malet to return to his master, renouncing his oath and his claim to William's daughter, because he loves England more. The men unsheathe their swords and raise them in homage to Harold and banners are unfurled.

=== Act 4. ===
It is early dawn, but still dark, in a room in a nunnery overlooking the plains of Hastings. Edith, in Nun's attire, is seated on a pallet, in despair as she wrestles with the past, praying that God will show her the way. Fearful of England's and Harold's fate, she is filled with dread, and she goes up to the window. Nuns chant in Latin, and Edith falls asleep. She sees a vision of Harold's tent, lighted by torches, with Harold and his knights carousing. This vision fades and is replaced by one of the plains of Hastings, with Saxon forces passing on their way to battle.

Harold appears on horseback, the vision fades and Edith awakens. She rushes again to the window and the battle begins. Once the battle is over, the clouds disperse, disclosing the field of Hastings, the night after the battle. In the centre is a hillock on which lie the body of King Harold and others. The Royal standard, of which the pole is broken, half remaining in the socket, lies by the King. Monks and nuns, some carrying torches, are wandering among the groups of fallen men chanting ‘Requiem aeternum’. The moon is obscured by clouds. Edith begins searching for Harold aided by some of the nuns and monks. As the moon breaks through the clouds, it falls on Harold's body. The Nuns and monks kneel. Edith rushes up in the faint hope of him being alive, and with an anguished cry announced that he is dead.

==== Ending 1. ====
Edith falls prostrate over Harold's body. Duke William approaches with his men, and Malet announces that Harold died 'as heroes die, upon the field'. William commands that he should be given a soldier's grave, and proclaims himself King. His men respond enthusiastically, and the standard-bearer replaces Harold's standard with that of William, while the nuns and monks remain kneeled round Harold's body. The End.

==== Ending 2. ====
Edith falls prostrate over Harold's body. The End.
