= Too Many Sopranos =

Too Many Sopranos is an opera by Indiana University Jacobs School of Music faculty member Edwin Penhorwood. Too Many Sopranos is a two-act opera in English with a pastiche of song from opera's various periods. A group of sopranos is trying to get into heaven, but there is no more room in the heavenly choir. So, something has to be done, and it looks like some will be sent to Hell!

== Background ==
Penhorwood wrote many gags into the opera based on stereotypes of sopranos, opera stock plots, and traditional staging. The Sandman is taken fully from Hänsel und Gretel, 'Unnamed Bass' is a reference to the fact that basses can be fairly anonymous in the opera community. The piece has become a popular one for opera workshops because of the many soprano parts and its relative brevity.

== Roles ==
Roles, voice types
Role	Voice type
St. Peter	bass-baritone
Dame Doleful	mezzo-soprano
Madame Pompous	soprano
Miss Titmouse	coloratura soprano
Just Jeannette	soprano
Sandman	soprano
Unnamed Bass	bass-baritone
Enrico Carouser	tenor
Gabriel, angel	silent
Nelson Deadly	tenor
Orson	bass

== Synopsis ==
Four sopranos are brought to heaven's gates, but are stopped by St. Peter. Room has opened up in the heavenly choir for only one soprano. Each auditions in her own way with an aria that exemplifies the traditions and excesses of its time. The sopranos are told that if there were more tenors and basses that were in the heavenly choir, there would be no problem in letting them in. So, the sopranos go to hell to retrieve the men who have been condemned to eternal torment. Through a few operatic "tests" like trying to remain awake for an hour (a task made harder by a stage director boring them to sleep), all the sopranos successfully gain entrance to heaven with the men in tow.
