= List of operas by composer =

This is a list of individual opera composers and their major works.

The list includes composers' principal operas and those of historical importance in the development of the art form. It covers the full historical period from the birth of opera in the late 16th century to the present day, and includes all forms of opera from light music to more formal styles.

== A ==
- Michel van der Aa (1970– ): After Life, One
- Evald Aav (1900–1939): Vikerlased
- Ludwig Abeille (1761–1838): Amor und Psyche, Peter und Ännchen
- Paul Abraham (1892–1960): Ball im Savoy, Die Blume von Hawaii, Viki, Viktoria und ihr Husar
- Adolphe Adam (1803–1856): Le chalet, Le postillon de Lonjumeau, La poupée de Nuremberg, Si j'étais roi, Le toréador
- Mark Adamo (1962– ): Little Women, Lysistrata
- John Adams (1947– ): Antony and Cleopatra, The Death of Klinghoffer, Doctor Atomic, A Flowering Tree, El Niño, I Was Looking at the Ceiling and Then I Saw the Sky, Nixon in China
- George Ade: The Sho-Gun (1904)
- Thomas Adès (1971– ): Powder Her Face, The Tempest, The Exterminating Angel
- Samuel Adler (1928– ): The Disappointment
- Isaac Albéniz (1860–1909): Henry Clifford, Pepita Jiménez, Merlin
- Eugen d'Albert (1864–1932): Flauto solo, Tiefland, Die toten Augen
- Tomaso Albinoni (1671–1750): Artamene, Didone abbandonata, Il tiranno eroe, La Statira, Zenobia
- Franco Alfano (1875–1954): Cyrano de Bergerac, Risurrezione, Sakùntala
- Francisco António de Almeida (c.1702–?1755): La Spinalba
- William Alwyn (1905–1985): Miss Julie
- Garland Anderson (1933–2001): Soyazhe
- Johann André (1741–1799): Erwin und Elmire, Der Töpfer
- Mark Andre (1964– ): Wunderzaichen
- Hendrik Andriessen (1892–1981): Philomela, De Spiegel uit Venetië
- Louis Andriessen (1939–2021): Rosa – A Horse Drama, Writing to Vermeer, La Commedia
- Pasquale Anfossi (1727–1797): L'avaro, Il curioso indiscreto, La vera costanza
- Anna Amalia of Brunswick-Wolfenbüttel (1739–1807): Erwin und Elmire
- George Antheil (1900–1959): Transatlantic, Helen Retires, Volpone
- Francesco Araja (1709–c. 1770): Tsefal i Prokris
- Anton Arensky (1861–1906): Dream on the Volga
- Dominick Argento (1927–2019): Casanova's Homecoming, Christopher Sly, Postcard from Morocco
- Thomas Arne (1710–1778): Alfred, Artaxerxes, Comus, The Cooper, Eliza, The Fairy Prince, Love in a Village, Rosamond, Thomas and Sally
- Samuel Arnold (1740–1802): The Baron Kinkvervankotsdorsprakingatchdern, Inkle and Yarico
- Leo Ascher (1880–1942): Hoheit tanzt Walzer
- Daniel Auber (1782–1871): Le cheval de bronze, Les diamants de la couronne, Le domino noir, Fra Diavolo, Gustave III, Haydée, Manon Lescaut, La muette de Portici, La part du diable
- Edmond Audran (1842–1901): La mascotte, Les noces d'Olivette
- Svitlana Azarova (1976– ): Momo og tidstyvene

== B ==
- Grażyna Bacewicz (1909–1969): The Adventure of King Arthur
- Johann Christian Bach (1735–1782): Temistocle, Amadis de Gaule
- Michael William Balfe (1808–1870): The Bohemian Girl, The Maid of Artois, The Rose of Castille, L'étoile de Seville, The Siege of Rochelle
- Granville Bantock (1868–1946): The Seal Woman
- Samuel Barber (1910–1981): Antony and Cleopatra, A Hand of Bridge, Vanessa
- Francisco A. Barbieri (1823–1894): Jugar con fuego, Los diamantes de la corona, El barberillo de Lavapiés
- John Barnett (1802–1890): Mountain Sylph, Fair Rosamond, Farinelli
- Gerald Barry (1952– ): The Bitter Tears of Petra von Kant, The Importance of Being Earnest
- Jiří Bárta (1935–2012): Čitra (Chitra)
- Béla Bartók (1881–1945): Bluebeard's Castle
- Jan Zdeněk Bartoš (1908–1981): Prokletý zámek (The Cursed Mansion)
- Franco Battiato (1945–2021): Genesi, Gilgamesh, Messa arcaica, Il cavaliere dell'intelletto
- Amy Beach (1867–1944): Cabildo
- Jack Beeson (1921–2010): Captain Jinks of the Horse Marines, Hello Out There, Lizzie Borden, The Sweet Bye and Bye
- Ludwig van Beethoven (1770–1827): Fidelio
- Ján Levoslav Bella (1843–1936): Wieland der Schmied
- Vincenzo Bellini (1801–1835): Adelson e Salvini, Beatrice di Tenda, Bianca e Fernando (Bianca e Gernando), I Capuleti e i Montecchi, Norma, Il pirata, I puritani, La sonnambula, La straniera, Zaira
- Antonia Bembo (1640?–1720?): Ercole amante
- Ralph Benatzky (1884–1957): Bezauberndes Fräulein, Meine Schwester und ich, The White Horse Inn (Im weißen Rößl)
- Georg Benda (1722–1795): Ariadne auf Naxos, Medea, Pygmalion, Romeo und Julie, Walder
- Julius Benedict (1804–1885): The Lily of Killarney
- Arthur Benjamin (1893–1960): The Devil Take Her
- George Benjamin (1960– ): Written on Skin, Lessons in Love and Violence
- Tim Benjamin (1975– ): The Corley Conspiracy
- Richard Rodney Bennett (1936–2012): The Mines of Sulphur
- Maksym Berezovsky (1745–1777): Demofonte
- Alban Berg (1885–1935): Lulu, Wozzeck
- Erik Bergman (1911–2006): The Singing Tree
- Luciano Berio (1925–2003): Opera, La vera storia, Un re in ascolto, Outis, Cronaca del luogo
- Lennox Berkeley (1903–1989): Nelson, Ruth
- Michael Berkeley (1948– ): Baa, Baa, Black Sheep, For You, Jane Eyre
- Hector Berlioz (1803–1869): Béatrice et Bénédict, Benvenuto Cellini, La damnation de Faust, Les francs-juges, Les Troyens
- Leonard Bernstein (1918–1990): Candide, A Quiet Place, Trouble in Tahiti, West Side Story
- Louise Bertin (1805–1877): La Esmeralda, Le loup-garou
- Franz Berwald (1796–1868): The Queen of Golconda, Estrella de Soria, I enter a monastery, The Modiste
- Oscar Bianchi (1975– ): Thanks to My Eyes
- Francesco Bianchi (1752–1810): Alonso e Cora, Arbace, Calto, Castore e Polluce, La morte di Cesare, Seleuco, re di Siria, La villanella rapita, Zemira
- Harrison Birtwistle (1934–2022): Gawain, The Io Passion, The Last Supper, The Mask of Orpheus, The Minotaur, The Second Mrs Kong, Punch and Judy, Yan Tan Tethera
- Georges Bizet (1838–1875): Carmen, Djamileh, Le docteur Miracle, Don Procopio, Ivan IV, La jolie fille de Perth, La maison du docteur, Les pêcheurs de perles
- Terence Blanchard (1962– ): Champion, Fire Shut Up in My Bones
- Arthur Bliss (1891–1975): The Olympians, Tobias and the Angel
- Marc Blitzstein (1905–1964): Triple-Sec, Regina
- Ernest Bloch (1880–1959): Macbeth
- Vilém Blodek (1834–1874): In the Well (V studni)
- Karl-Birger Blomdahl (1916–1968): Aniara
- John Blow (1649–1708): Venus and Adonis
- Luigi Boccherini (1743–1805): Clementina
- Philippe Boesmans (1936–2022): Julie, La passion de Gilles, Reigen, Wintermärchen
- Craig Bohmler (1956– ): Riders of the Purple Sage
- François-Adrien Boieldieu (1775–1834): Le calife de Bagdad, La dame blanche
- Joseph Bodin de Boismortier (1689–1755): Don Quichotte chez la Duchesse
- Arrigo Boito (1842–1918): Mefistofele, Nerone
- William Bolcom (1938– ): A View from the Bridge, A Wedding, McTeague
- Joseph Bologne (1745–1799): L'amant anonyme
- Antonio Maria Bononcini (1677–1726): Griselda
- Giovanni Bononcini (1670–1747): Muzio Scevola, Xerse, Griselda, Almahide, Camilla
- Alexander Borodin (1833–1887): Prince Igor (Knyaz Igor)
- Rutland Boughton (1878–1960): The Immortal Hour
- Antonio Braga (1929–2009): 1492 epopea lirica d'America, San Domenico di Guzman
- Walter Braunfels (1882–1954): Prinzessin Brambilla, Verkündigung, Die Vögel
- Eef van Breen (1978– ): ’u’
- Nicolae Bretan (1887–1968): Arald, Golem, Horia, Luceafarul
- Tomás Bretón (1850–1923): La verbena de la Paloma, La Dolores
- Benjamin Britten (1913–1976): Albert Herring, Billy Budd, The Burning Fiery Furnace, Curlew River, Death in Venice, Gloriana, The Little Sweep, A Midsummer Night's Dream, Noye's Fludde, Owen Wingrave, Paul Bunyan, Peter Grimes, The Prodigal Son, The Rape of Lucretia, The Turn of the Screw
- Rudolf Brucci (1917–2002): Gilgamesh
- Max Bruch (1838–1920): Die Loreley
- Arthur Bruhns (1874–1928): Ib and Little Christina
- Ignaz Brüll (1846–1907): Das goldene Kreuz
- Alfred Bruneau (1857–1934): Angelo, L'attaque du moulin, L'enfant roi, Messidor, L'ouragan, La rêve
- Joanna Bruzdowicz (1943–2021): The Penal Colony, The Women of Troy, The Gates of Paradise
- Mark Bucci (1924–2002): Tale for a Deaf Ear
- August Bungert (1845–1915): Die Odyssee
- Anthony Burgess (1917–1993): Blooms of Dublin
- Paul Burkhard (1911–1977): Feuerwerk (Der schwarze Hecht), Hopsa
- Keith Burstein (1957– ): Manifest Destiny
- Alan Bush (1900–1995): Men of Blackmoor, Wat Tyler, Joe Hill
- Ferruccio Busoni (1866–1924): Arlecchino, Die Brautwahl, Doktor Faust, Turandot
- Sylvano Bussotti (1931–2021): La Passion selon Sade, Le Racine

== C ==
- Francesca Caccini (1587–1630/1640): La liberazione di Ruggiero
- Giulio Caccini (1551–1618): Euridice, Il rapimento di Cefalo
- Charles Wakefield Cadman (1881–1946): The Garden of Mystery, Shanewis
- John Cage (1912–1992): Europeras
- Robert Cambert (c.1627–1677): Pomone
- André Campra (1660–1744): Alcine, Les âges, Le carnaval de Venise, L'Europe galante, Les fêtes vénitiennes, Hésione, Idoménée, Iphigénie en Tauride, Tancrède
- Michele Carafa (1787–1872): La belle au bois dormant
- David Carlson (1952– ): The Midnight Angel, Anna Karenina
- Frank Osmond Carr (1858–1916): His Excellency
- Pavlos Carrer (1829–1896): Dante e Bice, Isabella d'Aspeno, La Rediviva, Marcos Botsaris, Fior di Maria, I Kyra Frossyni, Maria Antonietta, Despo, Marathon – Salamis
- Elliott Carter (1908–2012): What Next?
- Alfredo Catalani (1854–1893): Loreley, La Wally
- Daniel Catán (1949–2011): Rappaccini's Daughter, Florencia en el Amazonas, Salsipuedes
- Eduard Caudella (1841–1924): Commandant Baltag, Petru Rareş
- Emilio de' Cavalieri (c. 1550–1602): Rappresentatione di Anima, et di Corpo
- Francesco Cavalli (1602–1676): Gli amori d'Apollo e di Dafne, Artemisia, Calisto, Ciro, Coriolano, Didone, Doriclea, Egisto, Elena, Eliogabalo, Ercole amante, Erismena, Eritrea, Giasone, Hipermestra, Orimonte, Orione, Oristeo, Ormindo, Mutio Scevola, Le nozze di Teti e di Peleo, Pompeo Magno, Rosinda, Scipione affricano, Statira principessa di Persia, Veremonda, La virtù de' strali d'Amore, Xerse
- Ludvík Čelanský (1870–1931): Kamilla
- Alfred Cellier (1844–1891): After All!, The Carp, Dora's Dream, Doris, Dorothy, In the Sulks, The Mountebanks, The Spectre Knight, The Sultan of Mocha, Topsyturveydom
- François Cellier (1849–1914): Captain Billy
- Friedrich Cerha (1926–2023): Baal, Der Rattenfänger, Der Riese von Steinfeld
- Antonio Cesti (1623–1669): Orontea, Il pomo d'oro
- Emmanuel Chabrier (1841–1894): Briséïs, Une éducation manquée, L'étoile, Fisch-Ton-Kan, Gwendoline, Le roi malgré lui
- Ruperto Chapí (1851–1909): Roger de Flor, Música clásica, La serenata, Las bravías, La revoltosa, El puñao de rosas, Margarita la tornera
- Gustave Charpentier (1860–1956): Julien, Louise
- Marc-Antoine Charpentier (1643–1704): Actéon, Les arts florissants, David et Jonathas, La descente d'Orphée aux enfers, Médée, Les plaisirs de Versailles
- Francis Chassaigne (1847–1922): Le droit d'aînesse
- Ernest Chausson (1855–1899): Le roi Arthus
- Carlos Chávez (1899–1978): The Visitors
- Deborah Cheetham (fl. 2011): Pecan Summer
- Luigi Cherubini (1760–1842): Les Abencérages, Anacréon, Le crescendo, Les deux journées, Eliza, Faniska, L'hôtellerie portugaise, Lodoïska, Médée, Pimmalione
- Unsuk Chin (1961– ): Alice in Wonderland
- Michael Ching (1958– ): Buoso's Ghost, A Midsummer Night's Dream: Opera A Cappella, Speed Dating Tonight!
- Francesco Cilea (1866–1950): Adriana Lecouvreur, L'arlesiana, Gloria
- Domenico Cimarosa (1749–1801): L'Armida immaginaria, Le astuzie femminili, La Cleopatra, Le donne rivali, La finta parigina, Giannina e Bernardone, L'impresario in angustie, Il maestro di cappella, Il matrimonio segreto, Gli Orazi e i Curiazi
- Frederic Clay (1838–1889): Ages Ago, The Gentleman in Black, Happy Arcadia, Princess Toto
- Thomas Clayton (1673–1725): Rosamond, Arsinoe, Queen of Cyprus
- Carlo Coccia (1782–1873): Arrighetto, Caterina di Guisa, Clotilde
- Juan J. Colomer (1966–): El Pintor, Dulcinea XL
- Paul Constantinescu (1909–1963): Pana Lesnea Rusalim, A stormy night, O noapte furtunoasa
- David Conte (1955– ): The Dreamers, Gift of the Magi
- Aaron Copland (1900–1990): The Second Hurricane, The Tender Land
- Azio Corghi (1937–2022): Il dissoluto assolto, Divara – Wasser und Blut
- John Corigliano (1938– ): The Ghosts of Versailles
- Peter Cornelius (1824–1874): Der Barbier von Bagdad, Der Cid, Gunlöd
- Noël Coward (1899–1973): Bitter Sweet
- Frederic Hymen Cowen (1852–1935): Harold or the Norman Conquest, Pauline, Signa, Thorgrim
- César Cui (1835–1918): Angelo, The Captain's Daughter, Feast in Time of Plague, Le flibustier, Ivan the Fool, Little Red Riding Hood, Mademoiselle Fifi, The Mandarin's Son, Mateo Falcone, Prisoner of the Caucasus, Puss in Boots, The Saracen, The Snow Bogatyr, William Ratcliff
- César Cui, Nikolai Rimsky-Korsakov, Modest Mussorgsky, Alexander Borodin: Mlada
- Douglas J. Cuomo (1958– ): Doubt
- Charles Cuvillier (1877–1955): Lilac Domino
- Chaya Czernowin (1957– ): Pnima...ins Innere, Adama

== D ==
- Nicolas Dalayrac (1753–1809): L'amant statue, Les deux petits savoyards, Nina
- Luigi Dallapiccola (1904–1975): Job, Il prigioniero, Ulisse, Volo di notte
- Ikuma Dan (1924–2001): Yūzuru (Twilight Crane), Takeru
- Richard Danielpour (1956– ): Margaret Garner
- Alexander Dargomyzhsky (1813–1869): Rusalka, The Stone Guest (Kammeny Gost)
- Michael Kevin Daugherty (1954– ): Jackie O
- Antoine Dauvergne (1713–1797): Les troqueurs
- Peter Maxwell Davies (1934–2016): The Doctor of Myddfai, Eight Songs for a Mad King, Kommilitonen!, The Lighthouse, The Martyrdom of St Magnus, Mr Emmet Takes a Walk, Resurrection, Taverner
- Victor Davies (1939– ): Transit of Venus
- Anthony Davis (1951– ): X, The Life and Times of Malcolm X, Under the Double Moon, Tania, Amistad, Wakonda's Dream
- Don Davis (1957– ): Río de Sangre
- Claude Debussy (1862–1918): Pelléas et Mélisande, Rodrigue et Chimène, Le diable dans le beffroi, La chute de la maison Usher
- Reginald De Koven (1859–1920): The Canterbury Pilgrims
- Brett Dean (1961– ): Bliss
- Miguel del Aguila (1957– ): Time and Again Barelas
- Léo Delibes (1836–1891): Jean de Nivelle, Lakmé, Le roi l'a dit
- Frederick Delius (1862–1934): Fennimore and Gerda, Koanga, A Village Romeo and Juliet (Romeo und Julia auf dem Dorfe)
- Rudolf Dellinger (1857–1910): Don Cesar
- Norman Dello Joio (1913–2008): The Triumph of St. Joan
- Edison Denisov (1929–1996): Soldier Ivan (Ivan-Soldat), L'écume des jours, Quatre filles
- Henri Desmarets (1661–1741): Didon, Vénus et Adonis, Iphigénie en Tauride
- Paul Dessau (1894–1979): Die Verurteilung des Lukullus, Einstein
- André Cardinal Destouches (1672–1749): Callirhoé, Les élémens, Issé
- Anton Diabelli (1781–1858): Adam in der Klemme
- Charles Dibdin (1745–1814): The Ephesian Matron, Lionel and Clarissa, The Padlock, The Recruiting Serjeant.
- David DiChiera (1935–2018): Cyrano
- Violeta Dinescu (1953– ): Hunger und Durst, Der 35 Mai, Eréndira, Schachnovelle, Herzriss
- Gaetano Donizetti (1797–1848): Adelia, L'ajo nell'imbarazzo, Alahor in Granata, Alfredo il grande, Alina, regina di Golconda, L'Ange de Nisida, Anna Bolena, L'assedio di Calais, Belisario, Betly, Il campanello, Il castello di Kenilworth, Caterina Cornaro, Le convenienze ed inconvenienze teatrali, Il diluvio universale, Le duc d'Albe, Dom Sébastien, Don Pasquale, L'elisir d'amore, Elvida, Emilia di Liverpool, Enrico di Borgogna, L'esule di Roma, Fausta, La favorite (La favorita), La fille du régiment, Francesca di Foix, Gabriella di Vergy, Gemma di Vergy, Gianni di Calais, Gianni di Parigi, Imelda de' Lambertazzi, Linda di Chamounix, Lucia di Lammermoor, Lucrezia Borgia, Maria di Rohan, Maria de Rudenz, Maria Padilla, Maria Stuarda, Marino Faliero, Olivo e Pasquale, Otto mesi in due ore, Il Pigmalione, Parisina, Pia de' Tolomei, Pietro il grande, Poliuto, Rita, Roberto Devereux, Rosmonda d'Inghilterra, Torquato Tasso, Ugo, conte di Parigi, La zingara, Zoraida di Granata
- Nico Dostal (1895–1981): Clivia, Manina, Monika, Die ungarische Hochzeit
- Jonathan Dove (1959– ): The Adventures of Pinocchio, Flight, Siren Song
- Sabin Drăgoi (1894–1968): Constantin Brâncoveanu, Horia, Kir Ianulea, The Misfortune (Napasta)
- Deborah Drattell (1956– ): Lilith, Nicholas and Alexandra
- Paul Dukas (1865–1935): Ariane et Barbe-Bleue
- Thomas Dunhill (1877–1946): Tantivy Towers
- Egidio Romualdo Duni (1708–1775): L'école de la jeunesse, La fée Urgèle, Le peintre amoureux de son modèle
- Pascal Dusapin (1955– ): Medeamaterial, Perelà, uomo di fumo
- Alphonse Duvernoy (1842–1907): Le Baron Frick, Hellé
- Antonín Dvořák (1841–1904): Alfred, Armida, The Cunning Peasant, The Devil and Kate (Čert a Káča), Dimitrij, The Jacobin (Jakobín), King and Charcoal Burner, Rusalka, The Stubborn Lovers (Tvrdé palice), Vanda

== E ==
- John Eaton (1935–2015): The Cry of Clytaemnestra, Danton and Robespierre, The Tempest
- John Eccles (1668–1735): Semele, The Judgement of Paris
- Werner Egk (1901–1983): Peer Gynt, Die Verlobung in San Domingo, Die Zaubergeige
- Gottfried von Einem (1918–1996): Der Besuch der alten Dame, Dantons Tod, Kabale und Liebe, Der Prozess
- George Enescu (1881–1955): Œdipe
- Péter Eötvös (1944–2024): Tri sestry, Love and Other Demons, Der goldene Drache
- Ferenc Erkel (1810–1893): Bánk bán, Hunyadi László
- Camille Erlanger (1863–1919): Le Juif Polonais
- Iván Erőd (1936–2019): La doncella, el marinero y el estudiante, Die Seidenraupen, Orpheus ex Machina, Der Füssener Totentanz, Die Liebesprobe, Pünktchen und Anton
- Edmund Eysler (1874–1949): Bruder Straubinger, Die gold'ne Meisterin

== F ==
- Franco Faccio (1840–1891): Amleto
- Leo Fall (1873–1925): Brüderlein fein, Die Dollarprinzessin, Der fidele Bauer, Die geschiedene Frau, Der liebe Augustin (English version: Princess Caprice), Madame Pompadour
- Manuel de Falla (1876–1946): Los amores de la Inés, El retablo de maese Pedro, La vida breve
- Gabriel Fauré (1845–1924): Pénélope, Prométhée
- Giuseppe Farinelli (1769–1836): Calliroe, Il Cid della Spagna, I riti d'Efeso
- Ivan Fedele (1953– ): Antigone
- Morton Feldman (1926–1987): Neither
- Francesco Feo (1691–1761): Andromaca
- Brian Ferneyhough (1943– ): Shadowtime
- Lorenzo Ferrero (1951– ): Rimbaud, ou le fils du soleil, Marilyn, La figlia del mago, Mare nostro, Night, Salvatore Giuliano, Charlotte Corday, Le Bleu-blanc-rouge et le noir, La nascita di Orfeo, La Conquista, Le piccole storie: Ai margini delle guerre, Risorgimento!
- Henry Février (1875–1957): Monna Vanna
- Zdeněk Fibich (1850–1900): Blaník, The Bride of Messina (Nevěsta messinská), Bukovín, The Fall of Arkun (Pád Arkuna), Hedy, Šárka, The Tempest (Bouře)
- Vivian Fine (1913–2000): The Women in the Garden
- Gottfried Finger (c. 1660–1730): The Virgin Prophetess
- Michael Finnissy (1946– ): Thérèse Raquin
- Valentino Fioravanti (1764–1837): Le cantatrici villane
- Elena Firsova (1950– ): A Feast in Time of Plague (Pir vo vremya chumy), The Nightingale and the Rose
- Domenico Fischietti (c. 1725–after c. 1810): Il mercato di Malmantile, Il signor dottore, Lo speziale
- Veniamin Fleishman (1913–1941): Rothschild's Violin
- Friedrich von Flotow (1812–1883): Alessandro Stradella, Martha
- Carlisle Floyd (1926–2021): Cold Sassy Tree, Flower and Hawk, Of Mice and Men, Slow Dusk, Susannah, Willie Stark, Wuthering Heights
- Josef Bohuslav Foerster (1859–1951): Debora, Eva, Jessika, The Invincible Ones (Nepřemožení), The Heart (Srdce), The Fool a.k.a. The Simpleton (Bloud)
- Yevstigney Fomin (1761–1800): Postal Coachmen at the Relay Station (Yamshchiki na podstave)
- Ernest Ford (1858–1919): Jane Annie
- Jacopo Foroni (1825–1858): Cristina, regina di Svezia
- Wolfgang Fortner (1907–1987): Bluthochzeit
- Lukas Foss (1922–2009): The Jumping Frog of Calaveras County, Griffelkin, Introductions and Good-byes
- Alberto Franchetti (1860–1942): Cristoforo Colombo, Germania, Asrael, La figlia di Iorio
- César Franck (1822–1890): Hulda, Ghiselle
- François Francoeur (1698–1787) and François Rebel (1701–1775): Pirame et Thisbé, Scanderberg
- Harold Fraser-Simson (1872–1944): The Maid of the Mountains
- Rudolf Friml (1879–1972): The Firefly, Rose-Marie, The Vagabond King

== G ==
- Marco da Gagliano (1582–1643): Dafne
- Baldassare Galuppi (1706–1785): Il filosofo di campagna, L'inimico delle donne (L'italiana in Oriente)
- Hans Gál (1890–1987): Der Arzt der Sobeide, Die heilige Ente, Das Lied der Nacht, Die beiden Klaas
- Louis Ganne (1862–1923): Les saltimbanques
- Margaret Garwood (1927–2015): Rappacini's Daughter
- Francesco Gasparini (1661–1727): Ambleto, Tamerlano, Bajazet
- Florian Leopold Gassmann (1729–1774): L'amore artigiano, La notte critica
- Stanislao Gastaldon (1861–1939): Mala Pasqua!
- Pierre Gaveaux (1761–1825): Le trompeur trompé
- Joaquín Gaztambide (1822–1870): El estreno de una artista, El juramento, Un pleito, Una vieja
- Giuseppe Gazzaniga (1743–1818): Antigono, Il barone di Trocchia, Don Giovanni Tenorio, La donna astuta, Ezio, Il finto cieco
- Pietro Generali (1773–1832): Adelina
- Roberto Gerhard (1896–1970): The Duenna
- Edward German (1862–1936): The Emerald Isle (with Arthur Sullivan), Fallen Fairies, Merrie England, A Princess of Kensington, The Rival Poets, Tom Jones
- Thomas German Reed (1817–1888): Eyes and No Eyes, No Cards, Our Island Home, A Sensation Novel
- George Gershwin (1898–1937): Blue Monday, Porgy and Bess
- Ottmar Gerster (1897–1969): Enoch Arden, Die Hexe von Passau
- Geminiano Giacomelli (1692–1740): La Merope
- Vittorio Giannini (1903–1966): Blennerhassett, The Taming of the Shrew
- Jean Gilbert (1879–1942): Die keusche Susanne
- Alberto Ginastera (1916–1983): Bomarzo, Beatrix Cenci, Don Rodrigo
- Umberto Giordano (1867–1948): La cena delle beffe, Andrea Chénier, Fedora, Madame Sans-Gêne, Mese mariano, Il re, Siberia
- Peggy Glanville-Hicks (1912–1990): Nausicaa, The Transposed Heads
- Philip Glass (1937– ): 1000 Airplanes on the Roof, Akhnaten, Appomattox, La Belle et la bête, The Civil Wars: A Tree Is Best Measured When It Is Down, O Corvo Branco, Einstein on the Beach, The Fall of the House of Usher, Galileo Galilei, Hydrogen Jukebox, The Juniper Tree, Kepler, Monsters of Grace, The Photographer, Satyagraha, The Voyage
- Mikhail Glinka (1804–1857): A Life for the Tsar (Zhizn za tsarya), Ruslan and Lyudmila
- Christoph Willibald Gluck (1714–1787): Alceste, L'arbre enchanté, Armide, Le cadi dupé, Le cinesi, La Cythère assiégée, Le diable à quatre, Echo et Narcisse, La fausse esclave, Le feste d'Apollo, L'ile de Merlin, Iphigénie en Aulide, Iphigénie en Tauride, L'ivrogne corrigé, Orfeo ed Euridice, Paride ed Elena, La rencontre imprévue, Telemaco
- Benjamin Godard (1849–1895): Jocelyn
- Alexander Goedicke (1877–1957): Virineya (Виринея), At the Crossing (У перевоза), Jacquerie (Жакерия), Macbeth (Макбет)
- Alexander Goehr (1932–2024): Arden Must Die, Arianna, Behold the Sun, Kantan and Damask Drum, Triptych
- Hermann Goetz (1840–1876): Der Widerspänstigen Zähmung
- Walter Goetze (1883–1961): Der goldene Pierrot, Ihre Hoheit, die Tänzerin
- Karl Goldmark (1830–1915): Das Heimchen am Herd, Die Königin von Saba
- Osvaldo Golijov (1960– ): Ainadamar
- Antônio Carlos Gomes (1836–1896): Condor, Fosca, Il Guarany, Joana de Flandres, Lo schiavo, Maria Tudor, A noite do castelo, Salvator Rosa
- Fernando González Casellas (1925–1998): Saverio el Cruel
- Ricky Ian Gordon (1956– ): The Grapes of Wrath
- François-Joseph Gossec (1734–1829): Les pêcheurs, Sabinus, Thésée, Le tonnelier, Le triomphe de la République
- Jakov Gotovac (1895–1982): Ero s onoga svijeta (Ero the Joker)
- Charles Gounod (1818–1893): Cinq-Mars, La colombe, Faust, Maître Pierre, Le médecin malgré lui, Mireille, La nonne sanglante, Philémon et Baucis, Polyeucte, La reine de Saba, Roméo et Juliette, Sapho, Le tribut de Zamora
- Orlando Gough (1953–): The Finnish Prisoner
- Louis Grabu (fl. 1665–1690, died after 1693): Albion and Albanius
- Paul Graener (1872–1944): Hanneles Himmelfahrt
- Enrique Granados (1867–1916): Goyescas, María del Carmen
- Bruno Granichstaedten (1879–1944): Der Orlow
- Carl Heinrich Graun (1704–1759): Montezuma
- Maurice Greene (1696–1755): Florimel, Phoebe
- André Grétry (1741–1813): L'amant jaloux, Andromaque, Aucassin et Nicolette, La caravane du Caire, Colinette à la cour, L’épreuve villageoise, Les deux avares, Guillaume Tell, Le Huron, Le jugement de Midas, Lucile, Les mariages samnites, Pierre le Grand, Richard Coeur-de-lion, Le tableau parlant, Zémire et Azor
- George Grossmith (1847–1912): Haste to the Wedding, Cups and Saucers
- Jacinto Guerrero (1895–1951): El huésped del Sevillano
- Pietro Alessandro Guglielmi (1728–1804): Alceste, La bella pescatrice, La pastorella nobile, Il ratto della sposa, Lo spirito di contradizione, La sposa fedele
- Manfred Gurlitt (1890–1973): Wozzeck

== H ==
- Pavel Haas (1899–1944): Šarlatán
- Alois Hába (1893–1973): The Mother
- Henry Kimball Hadley (1871–1937): Azora, the Daughter of Montezuma, Bianca, Cleopatra's Night, A Night in Old Paris, Safié
- Daron Hagen (1961– ): Amelia, Shining Brow, Bandanna, Vera of Las Vegas, The Antient Concert, New York Stories
- Reynaldo Hahn (1874–1947): Ciboulette
- Jakob Haibel (1762–1826): Der Tyroler Wastel
- Fromental Halévy (1799–1862): L'artisan, Charles VI, L'éclair, Jaguarita l'Indienne, Le Juif errant, La Juive, Ludovic, Le nabab, Noé, La reine de Chypre, Le val d'Andorre
- Iain Hamilton (1922–2000): Anna Karenina, The Catiline Conspiracy, The Royal Hunt of the Sun
- George Frideric Handel (1685–1759): Acis and Galatea, Admeto, Agrippina, Alcina, Alessandro, Alessandro Severo, Almira, Amadigi di Gaula, Arianna in Creta, Ariodante, Arminio, Atalanta, Berenice, Deidamia, Ezio, Faramondo, Flavio, Floridante, Florindo, Giove in Argo, Giulio Cesare, Giustino, Hercules, Imeneo, Lotario, Muzio Scevola, Oreste, Orlando, Ottone, Parnasso in festa, Partenope, Il pastor fido, Poro, Radamisto, Riccardo Primo, Rinaldo, Rodelinda, Rodrigo, Samson, Scipione, Semele, Serse, Silla, Siroe, Sosarme, Tamerlano, Teseo, Theodora, Tolomeo
- Howard Hanson (1896–1981): Merry Mount
- Kazuko Hara (1935–2014): Crime and Punishment, Yosakoi Bushi
- John Harbison (1938– ): The Great Gatsby
- Stephen Hartke (1952– ): The Greater Good, or the Passion of Boule de Suif
- Johann Adolph Hasse (1699–1783): Artaserse, Antonio e Cleopatra, Cleofide, Piramo e Tisbe, Siroe, Il Ruggiero
- Joseph Haydn (1732–1809): L'anima del filosofo, Armida, La canterina, La fedeltà premiata, L'infedeltà delusa, L'isola disabitata, Il mondo della luna, Orlando paladino, Lo speziale, La vera costanza, L'incontro improvviso
- Jake Heggie (1961– ): Dead Man Walking, The End of the Affair, Last Acts
- Peter Arnold Heise (1830–1879): Drot og marsk
- Moya Henderson (1941– ): Lindy
- Hans Werner Henze (1926–2012): The Bassarids, Boulevard Solitude, Elegy for Young Lovers, The English Cat, Der junge Lord, König Hirsch, Phaedra, Der Prinz von Homburg, L'Upupa und der Triumph der Sohnesliebe, Venus und Adonis, Das verratene Meer, We Come to the River
- Victor Herbert (1859–1924): Babes in Toyland, Dream City, The Dream Girl, Eileen, The Fortune Teller, The Magic Knight, Mlle. Modiste, Natoma, Naughty Marietta, Prince Ananias, The Princess Pat, The Red Mill, The Serenade, Sweethearts, The Wizard of the Nile
- Ferdinand Hérold (1791–1833): Le pré aux clercs, Zampa
- Bernard Herrmann (1911–1975): Wuthering Heights
- Philippe Hersant (1948– ): Le Château des Carpathes, Le Moine noir
- Hervé (1825–1892): Chilpéric, Don Quichotte et Sancho Pança, Mam'zelle Nitouche
- Richard Heuberger (1850–1914): Der Opernball
- Juan Hidalgo de Polanco (1614–1685): Celos aun del aire matan, Los celos hacen estrellas, La púrpura de la rosa
- Johann Adam Hiller (1728–1804): Die Jagd, Lisuart und Dariolette, Lottchen am Hofe, Die verwandelten Weiber
- Paul Hindemith (1895–1963): Cardillac, Die Harmonie der Welt, Hin und zurück, Lehrstück, The Long Christmas Dinner, Mathis der Maler, Mörder, Hoffnung der Frauen, Neues vom Tage, Das Nusch-Nuschi, Sancta Susanna, Wir bauen eine Stadt
- Emil Hlobil (1901–1987): Anna Karenina, Měšťák šlechticem (Le Bourgeois gentilhomme), Král Václav IV (King Wenceslaus IV)
- Lee Hoiby (1926–2011): The Scarf, Summer and Smoke
- E. T. A. Hoffmann (1776–1822): Undine
- Igo Hofstetter (1926–2002): Roulette der Herzen, Alles spricht von Charpillon, Schach dem Boss
- York Höller (1944– ): Der Meister und Margarita
- Heinz Holliger (1939– ): Schneewittchen
- Gustav Holst (1874–1934): The Revoke, The Idea, The Youth's Choice, Sita, At the Boar's Head, The Perfect Fool, Savitri, The Wandering Scholar
- Ignaz Holzbauer (1711–1783): Günther von Schwarzburg
- Arthur Honegger (1892–1955): Judith, Antigone, Les aventures du roi Pausole, La belle de Moudon, Les petites, L'aiglon (with Jacques Ibert)
- Toshio Hosokawa (1955– ): Vision of Lear, Hanjo
- Mark Houston (1946–1995): Hazel Kirke
- Jenő Hubay (1858–1937): Alienor, A cremonai hegedűs (The Violin Maker of Cremona), A falu rossza (The Village Vagabond), Moharózsa (Moss Rose), Lavotta szerelme, Karenina Anna (Anna Karenina), Az álarc (The Mask), A milói Vénusz (The Venus de Milo), Az önző óriás (The Selfish Giant; based on the story by Oscar Wilde)
- Engelbert Humperdinck (1854–1921): Hänsel und Gretel, Königskinder
- Ilja Hurník (1922–2013): Dáma a lupiči (The Lady and the Robbers), Mudrci a bloudi (Wisemen and Fools), Rybáři v síti (Fishermen in Their Own Nets), Oldřich a Boženka (Oldřich and Boženka)
- Jenő Huszka (1875–1960): Aranyvirág, Prince Bob (Bob herceg), Gül Baba, Baroness Lili (Lili bárónő), Tilos a Bemenet (No Entry)
- Ketil Hvoslef (1939– ): Barabbas
- Jason Kao Hwang (1957– ): The Floating Box: A Story in Chinatown

== I ==
- Vincent d'Indy (1851–1931): Le chant de la cloche, L'étranger, Fervaal, La légende de Saint-Christophe, Le rêve de Cinyras
- Nicolas Isouard (1775–1818): Cendrillon, Joconde, Les rendez-vous bourgeois

== J ==
- Victor Jacobi (1883–1921): The Bravest Hussar, The Haughty Princess, The Marriage Market, Szibill
- Edward Jakobowski (1858–1927): Erminie
- Leoš Janáček (1854–1928): The Beginning of a Romance (Počátek Románu), The Cunning Little Vixen (Příhody lišky Bystroušky), Destiny (Osud), The Excursions of Mr. Brouček to the Moon and to the 15th Century (Výlet pana Broučka do XV století/Výlet pana Broučka do Měsíce), From the House of the Dead (Z mrtvého domu), Jenůfa (Její pastorkyňa), Káťa Kabanová, The Makropulos Affair (Věc Makropulos), Šárka
- Élisabeth Jacquet de La Guerre (1665–1729): Céphale et Procris
- Georg Jarno (1868–1920): Die Försterchristl
- Leon Jessel (1871–1942): Schwarzwaldmädel
- Alan John (1958– ): The Eighth Wonder, Through the Looking Glass
- Niccolò Jommelli (1714–1774): Armida abbandonata, Demofoonte, Fetonte, Iphigenia in Tauride, L'Olimpiade, La schiava liberata, L'uccelellatrice, Vologeso
- Scott Joplin (1868–1917): A Guest of Honor, Treemonisha
- Wilfred Josephs (1927–1997): Rebecca

== K ==
- Emmerich Kálmán (1882–1953): Arizona Lady, Die Bajadere, Gräfin Mariza, Die Csárdásfürstin, Zsuzsi kisasszony, Die Herzogin von Chicago, Kaiserin Josephine, Marinka, Az obsitos (The Soldier on Leave), Tatárjárás, Das Veilchen vom Montmartre, Der Zigeunerprimas (The Gipsy Virtuoso), Die Zirkusprinzessin
- Manolis Kalomiris (1883–1962): Protomastoras, The ring of the mother, Anatoli, Ta xotika nera, Konstantinos Palaiologos
- Rudolf Kattnigg (1895–1955): Balkanliebe
- Nigel Keay (1955– ): At the Hawk's Well
- Reinhard Keiser (1674–1739): Croesus, Fredegunda, Masagniello, Octavia, Ulysses
- Jerome Kern (1885–1945): Show Boat
- Wilhelm Kienzl (1857–1941): Der Evangelimann (1895), Don Quixote (1898), Der Kuhreigen (1911), Das Testament (1916)
- Giselher Klebe (1925–2009): Alkmene, Chlestakows Wiederkehr, Die Ermordung Cäsars, Die Fastnachtsbeichte, Figaro läßt sich scheiden, Gervaise Macquart, Jacobowsky und der Oberst, Der Jüngste Tag, Das Mädchen aus Domrémy, Das Märchen von der schönen Lilie, Die Räuber, Das Rendezvous, Die tödlichen Wünsche, Ein wahrer Held
- Alexander Knaifel (1943–2024): The Canterville Ghost (Kentervil'skoye prividenie), Alice in Wonderland
- Oliver Knussen (1952–2018): Higglety Pigglety Pop!, Where the Wild Things Are
- Zoltán Kodály (1882–1967): Háry János
- Joonas Kokkonen (1921–1996): The Last Temptations
- Walter Kollo (1878–1940): Drei alte Schachteln, Filmzauber, Die Frau ohne Kuss, Wie einst im Mai
- Nikolai Korndorf (1947–2001): MR (Marina and Rainer)
- Erich Wolfgang Korngold (1897–1957): Die Kathrin, Der Ring des Polykrates, Die tote Stadt, Violanta, Das Wunder der Heliane
- Petr Kotik (1942– ) Many, Many Women
- Reginald De Koven (1859–1920): The Knickerbockers, Rip Van Winkle, Rob Roy, Robin Hood
- Hans Krása (1899–1944): Brundibár
- Fritz Kreisler (1875–1962): Sissy
- Ernst Krenek (1900–1991): The Bell Tower, Cefalo e Procri, Der Diktator, Jonny spielt auf, Karl V, Leben des Orest, Orpheus und Eurydike, Schwergewicht, Tarquin, What Price Confidence?
- Conradin Kreutzer (1780–1849): Das Nachtlager in Granada, Der Verschwender
- Rodolphe Kreutzer (1766–1831): La mort d'Abel
- Eduard Künneke (1885–1953): The Cousin from Nowhere
- F.L.Æ. Kunzen (1761–1817): Holger Danske
- György Kurtág (born 1926): Fin de partie

== L ==
- Helmut Lachenmann (1935– ): Das Mädchen mit den Schwefelhölzern
- Franz Lachner (1803–1890): Caterina Cornaro
- Lori Laitman (1955– ): Come to Me In Dreams, The Scarlet Letter, The Three Feathers
- Édouard Lalo (1823–1892): Le roi d'Ys, Fiesque
- John La Montaine (1920–2013): Novellis, Novellis, The Shephardes Playe, Erode the Greate, Be Glad Then, America
- Stefano Landi (1587–1639): La morte d'Orfeo, Il Sant'Alessio
- Elena Langer (1974– ): Figaro Gets a Divorce
- Rued Langgaard (1893–1952): Antikrist
- Isidore de Lara (1858–1935): Messaline
- Lars-Erik Larsson (1908–1986): Prinsessan av Cypern
- Felice Lattuada (1882–1962): Le preziose ridicule, La tempesta
- Elodie Lauten (1950–2014): The Death of Don Juan
- Armas Launis (1884–1959): Seven Brothers, Kullervo, Aslak Hetta, Jehudith, among others
- Henry Lawes (1595–1662), Henry Cooke (1616–1672) et al.: The Siege of Rhodes
- Jean-Marie Leclair (1697–1764): Scylla et Glaucus
- Charles Lecocq (1832–1918): La fille de Madame Angot, Giroflé-Girofla, Le petit duc
- Ton de Leeuw (1926–1996): Antigone
- Nicola LeFanu (1947– ): Blood Wedding, The Story of Mary O'Neill, Light Passing
- Giovanni Legrenzi (1626–1690): I due Cesari, Eteocle e Polinice, Il Giustino, La divisione del mondo, Totila, Zenobia e Radamisto
- Franz Lehár (1870–1948): Endlich allein, Giuditta, Der Göttergatte, Der Graf von Luxemburg, The Land of Smiles (Das Land des Lächelns), The Merry Widow (Die lustige Witwe), Paganini, Der Zarewitsch
- Jean-Baptiste Lemoyne (1751–1796) Électre, Nephté, Phèdre
- Nicholas Lens (1957– ): Slow Man, Shell Shock
- Ruggero Leoncavallo (1857–1919): Are You There?, La bohème, Chatterton, Edipo re, Goffredo Mameli, La jeunesse de Figaro, Maià, I Medici, Pagliacci, Der Roland von Berlin, Zazà, Zingari
- Jean-François Le Sueur (1760–1837): La caverne, La mort d'Adam, Ossian, ou Les bardes
- György Ligeti (1923–2006): Le Grand Macabre
- Liza Lim (1966– ): The Navigator
- Paul Lincke (1866–1946): Frau Luna
- Peter Josef von Lindpaintner (1791–1856): Der Vampyr
- Thomas Linley the elder (1733–1795): The Duenna
- Vatroslav Lisinski (1819–1854): Porin
- Franz Liszt (1811–1886): Don Sanche
- Antonio de Literes (1673–1747): Los elementos, Acis y Galatea, Júpiter y Semele
- Ricardo Llorca (1962– ): Las horas vacias
- George Lloyd (1913–1998): Irmelin, John Socman
- Matthew Locke (1621–1677): The Cruelty of the Spaniards in Peru, The History of Sir Francis Drake
- Edward Loder (1813–1865): Raymond and Agnes
- Richard Harvey Lohr: Kenilworth
- Albert Lortzing (1801–1851): Die beiden Schützen, Hans Sachs, Die Opernprobe, Undine, Der Waffenschmied, Der Wildschütz, Zar und Zimmermann
- Charles Lucas: The Regicide
- Gustav Luders: The Sho-Gun (1904)
- Jean-Baptiste Lully (1632–1687): Achille et Polyxène, Acis et Galatée, Alceste, Amadis, Armide, Atys, Bellérophon, Cadmus et Hermione, Les fêtes de l'amour et de Bacchus, Isis, Pastorale comique, Persée, Phaëton, Proserpine, Psyché, Roland, Thésée
- Meyer Lutz (1829–1903): Faust and Marguerite
- Ralph Lyford (1882–1927): Castle Agrazant
- Mykola Lysenko (1842–1912): Natalka Poltavka, Taras Bulba, May Night

== M ==
- Lorin Maazel (1930–2014): 1984
- Hamish MacCunn (1868–1916): Jeanie Deans
- George Alexander Macfarren (1813–1887): Robin Hood, She Stoops to Conquer, Helvellyn
- Alexander Mackenzie (1847–1935): Colomba, His Majesty
- James MacMillan (1959– ): Inés de Castro, The Sacrifice, Clemency
- Elizabeth Maconchy (1907–1994): The Departure, The Sofa, The Three Strangers
- Bruno Maderna (1920–1973): Satyricon
- Leevi Madetoja (1887–1947): The Ostrobothnians (Pohjalaisia), Juha
- Albéric Magnard (1865–1914): Bérénice, Guercœur
- Ernst Mahle (1929–2025): A Moreninha, Marroquinhas Fru-Fru, O Garatuja
- Mesías Maiguashca (1938– ): Los enemigos
- Aimé Maillart (1817–1871): Les dragons de Villars
- Kiril Makedonski (1925–1984): Goce
- Gian Francesco Malipiero (1882–1973): Torneo notturno
- Francesco Mancini (1672–1737): L’Idaspe fedele
- Philippe Manoury (1952– ): 60th Parallel, K
- Nikolaos Mantzaros (1795–1872): Don Crepuscolo
- Marin Marais (1656–1728): Alcyone, Sémélé
- Filippo Marchetti (1831–1902): Romeo e Giulietta, Ruy Blas
- Miguel Marqués (1843–1918): Perla, El zortzico, El reloj de Lucerna
- Heinrich Marschner (1795–1861): Hans Heiling, Der Templer und die Jüdin, Der Vampyr
- Vicente Martín y Soler (1754–1806): L'arbore di Diana, Una cosa rara, Il burbero di buon cuore
- Bohuslav Martinů (1890–1959): Alexandre bis, Ariane, Comedy on the Bridge (Veselohra na mostě), Divadlo za branou ()The Theatre beyond the Gate, The Greek Passion (Řecké pašije), Julietta, Larmes de couteau, The Marriage (Ženitba), Mirandolina, The Plays of Mary, Les trois souhaits, The Voice of the Forest (Hlas lesa), What Men Live By (Čím člověk žije)
- Pietro Mascagni (1863–1945): Amica, L'amico Fritz, Cavalleria rusticana, Guglielmo Ratcliff, Iris, Isabeau, Lodoletta, Le maschere, Nerone, Parisina, Il piccolo Marat, I Rantzau, Silvano, Zanetto
- Benedict Mason (1954– ): Playing Away
- Victor Massé (1822–1884): Les noces de Jeannette
- Jules Massenet (1842–1912): Amadis, Ariane, Bacchus, Cendrillon, Chérubin, Le Cid, Cléopâtre, Don César de Bazan, Don Quichotte, Esclarmonde, La grand'tante, Grisélidis, Hérodiade, Le jongleur de Notre-Dame, Le mage, Manon, La Navarraise, Panurge, Le portrait de Manon, Le roi de Lahore, Roma, Sapho, Thaïs, Thérèse, Werther
- Teizo Matsumura (1929–2007): Chinmoku (Silence)
- Siegfried Matthus (1934–2021): Graf Mirabeau, Judith, Der letzte Schuss, Die unendliche Geschichte, Die Weise von Liebe und Tod des Cornets Christoph Rilke
- Nicholas Maw (1935–2009): The Rising of the Moon, Sophie's Choice
- Simon Mayr (1763–1845): L'amor coniugale, Ginevra di Scozia, La Lodoiska, Medea in Corinto, La rosa bianca e la rosa rossa, Fedra, Adelaide di Guesclino
- Toshiro Mayuzumi (1929–1997): Kinkakuji (The Golden Pavilion)
- Domenico Mazzocchi (1592–1665): La catena d'Adone
- Virgilio Mazzocchi (1597–1646) and Marco Marazzoli (c. 1602 to 1608–1662): Chi soffre, speri
- Richard Meale (1932–2009): Voss
- Kirke Mechem (1925– ): Tartuffe
- Étienne Méhul (1763–1817): Adrien, Les amazones, Ariodant, Euphrosine, Horatius Coclès, L'irato, Le jeune Henri, Joseph, Mélidore et Phrosine, Stratonice, Uthal
- Alessandro Melani (1639–1703): L'empio punito
- Jacopo Melani (1623–1676): Girello, Il potestà di Colognole
- Erkki Melartin (1875–1937): Aino
- Felix Mendelssohn (1809–1847): Die beiden Neffen, Die beiden Pädagogen, Die Heimkehr aus der Fremde, Die Hochzeit des Camacho, Die Soldatenliebschaft
- Gian Carlo Menotti (1911–2007): Amahl and the Night Visitors, Amelia Goes to the Ball, The Boy Who Grew Too Fast, The Consul, Help, Help, the Globolinks!, The Last Savage, Maria Golovin, The Medium, The Old Maid and the Thief, The Saint of Bleecker Street, The Telephone, or L'Amour à trois
- Saverio Mercadante (1795–1870): Il bravo, I briganti, Elena da Feltre, Elisa e Claudio, Il giuramento, Orazi e Curiazi, Il reggente, La vestale, Virginia, The Most Important Man
- Aarre Merikanto (1893–1958): Juha
- Oskar Merikanto (1868–1927): The Maiden of the North (Pohjan neiti, 1898), The Death of Elina (Elinan surma, 1910), Regina von Emmeritz (1920)
- André Messager (1853–1929): L'amour masqué, La Basoche, La Béarnaise, Béatrice, Le bourgeois de Calais, Coups de roulis, La fauvette du temple, Fortunio, François les bas-bleus, Isoline, Le mari de la reine, Madame Chrysanthème, Mirette, Monsieur Beaucaire, Passionément, La petite fonctionnaire, Les p'tites Michu, Véronique
- Olivier Messiaen (1908–1992): Saint François d'Assise
- Giacomo Meyerbeer (1791–1864): L'Africaine, Il crociato in Egitto, Dinorah, L'esule di Granata, L'étoile du nord, Ein Feldlager in Schlesien, Les Huguenots, Jephtas Gelübde, Margherita d'Anjou, Le prophète, Robert le diable, Semiramide riconosciuta
- Marcel Mihalovici (1898–1985): Krapp, ou, La dernière bande
- Minoru Miki (1930–2011): Ada, An Actor's Revenge, Ai-en, Genji monogatari, The Happy Pagoda, Jōruri, The Monkey Poet, The River Sumida / Kusabira, Shizuka and Yoshitsune, Shunkinshō, Terute and Oguri, Wakahime, Yomigaeru
- Darius Milhaud (1892–1974): L'abandon d'Ariane, Bolivar, Christophe Colomb, David, La mère coupable, Le pauvre matelot
- Carl Millöcker (1842–1899): Der arme Jonathan, Der Bettelstudent, Der Feldprediger, Gräfin Dubarry, Gasparone, Das verwunschene Schloss
- Richard Mills (1949– ): Summer of the Seventeenth Doll, Batavia, The Love of the Nightingale
- Jean-Joseph de Mondonville (1711–1772): Les fêtes de Paphos, Titon et l'Aurore
- Stanisław Moniuszko (1819–1872): The Countess (Hrabina), Halka, The Haunted Manor (Straszny dwór), Verbum nobile
- Meredith Monk (1942– ): Atlas
- Pierre-Alexandre Monsigny (1729–1817): Aline, reine de Golconde, Le déserteur, On ne s'avise jamais de tout, Le roi et le fermier
- Michel Pignolet de Montéclair (1667–1737): Les festes de l'été, Jephté
- Italo Montemezzi (1875–1952): L'amore dei tre re, Giovanni Galurese, Hellera, L'incantesimo, La nave, La notte di Zoraima
- José Ángel Montero (1832–1881): Virginia
- Claudio Monteverdi (1567–1643): L'Arianna, L'incoronazione di Poppea, L'Orfeo, Il ritorno d'Ulisse in patria
- Douglas Moore (1893–1969): The Ballad of Baby Doe, The Devil and Daniel Webster, Carry Nation, Giants in the Earth
- Robert Moran (1937– ): Desert of Roses, The Dracula Diary, From the Towers of the Moon, The Juniper Tree, The Night Passage
- Federico Moreno Torroba (1891–1982): Luisa Fernanda, La Chulapona, La Virgen de Mayo, El poeta
- Lodewijk Mortelmans (1868–1952): De Kinderen van Zee (The Children of the Sea)
- Jean-Joseph Mouret (1682–1738): Les amours de Ragonde
- Wolfgang Amadeus Mozart (1756–1791): Apollo et Hyacinthus, Ascanio in Alba, Bastien und Bastienne, La clemenza di Tito, Così fan tutte, Don Giovanni, Die Entführung aus dem Serail, La finta giardiniera, La finta semplice, Idomeneo, Lucio Silla, The Magic Flute, The Marriage of Figaro, Mitridate, re di Ponto, L'oca del Cairo, Il re pastore, Der Schauspieldirektor, Die Schuldigkeit des ersten Gebots, Il sogno di Scipione, Lo sposo deluso, Thamos, King of Egypt, Zaide
- Wenzel Müller (1767–1835): Alpenkönig und der Menschenfeind, Der Barometermacher auf der Zauberinsel, Die gefesselte Phantasie, Kaspar der Fagottist, Das Neusonntagskind, Das Sonnenfest der Braminen, Die Teufelsmühle am Wienerberge
- Vano Muradeli (1908–1970): The Great Friendship, Moscow-Paris-Moscow
- Thea Musgrave (1928– ): A Christmas Carol, The Decision, Harriet, the Woman called 'Moses', Mary, Queen of Scots, An Occurrence at Owl Creek Bridge, The Voice of Ariadne
- Modest Mussorgsky (1839–1881): Boris Godunov, The Fair at Sorochyntsi (Sorochinskaya Yarmarka), Khovanshchina, Zhenitba (The Marriage), Salammbô
- Emanuele Muzio (1821–1890): Giovanna la pazza, Claudia, Le due regine, La sorrentina
- Josef Mysliveček (1737–1781): Adriano in Siria, Antigona, Antigono, Armida, Artaserse, Atide, Il Bellerofonte, La Calliroe, La Circe, La clemenza di Tito, Demetrio [1st version], Demetrio [2nd version], Demofoonte [1st version], Demofoonte [2nd version], Ezio [1st version], Ezio [2nd version], Farnace, Tamerlano, Ipermestra, Medonte, Motezuma, La Nitteti, L'Olimpiade, Romolo ed Ersilia, Semiramide, Il trionfo di Clelia

== N ==
- Nicolas Nabokov (1903–1978): Love's Labour's Lost
- Eduard Nápravník (1839–1916): Dubrovsky
- Isaac Nathan (1792–1864): Don John of Austria
- Oskar Nedbal (1874–1930): Polská krev, Vinobraní
- Christian Gottlob Neefe (1748–1798): Adelheit von Veltheim
- Viktor Nessler (1841–1890): Der Rattenfänger von Hameln, Der Trompeter von Säkkingen
- Otto Nicolai (1810–1849): The Merry Wives of Windsor
- Edmund Nick (1891–1973): Das kleine Hofkonzert
- Louis Niedermeyer (1802–1861): Marie Stuart, Stradella
- Carl Nielsen (1865–1931): Maskarade, Saul og David
- Alessandro Nini (1805–1880): La marescialla d'Ancre
- Luigi Nono (1924–1990): Al gran sole carico d'amore, Intolleranza 1960, Prometeo
- Serge Noskov (1956– ): Kuratov
- Vítězslav Novák (1870–1949): Lucerna (The Lantern)
- Ivor Novello (1893–1951): The Dancing Years, Perchance to Dream, King's Rhapsody
- Michael Nyman (1944– ): Facing Goya, Letters, Riddles and Writs, Love Counts, Man and Boy: Dada, The Man Who Mistook His Wife for a Hat, Noises, Sounds & Sweet Airs, Tristram Shandy

== O ==
- Jacques Offenbach (1819–1880): Le 66, L'alcôve, Apothicaire et perruquier, Bagatelle, Barbe-bleue, Barkouf, Ba-ta-clan, Les bavards, La belle Hélène, Les bergers, La bonne d'enfant, Les brigands, La chanson de Fortunio, Le château à Toto, La chatte métamorphosée en femme, La créole, Croquefer, ou Le dernier des paladins, Daphnis et Chloé, Les deux aveugles, Fantasio, La fille du tambour-major, Le financier et le savetier, Geneviève de Brabant, La Grande-Duchesse de Gérolstein, L'île de Tulipatan, La jolie parfumeuse, Lischen et Fritzchen, Madame Favart, Madame l'archiduc, Le mariage aux lanternes, Mesdames de la Halle, M. Choufleuri restera chez lui le . . ., Monsieur et Madame Denis, Orpheus in the Underworld, La Périchole, La permission de dix heures, Pierrette et Jacquot, Le pont des soupirs, Robinson Crusoé, La rose de Saint-Flour, The Tales of Hoffmann, Tromb-al-ca-zar, ou Les criminels dramatiques, Un mari à la porte, Vert-Vert, La Vie parisienne, Le violoneux, Le voyage dans la lune
- Stephen Oliver (1950–92): The Duchess of Malfi
- Carl Orff (1895–1982): Antigonae, De temporum fine comoedia, Der Mond, Die Kluge, Prometheus
- Giuseppe Maria Orlandini (1676–1760): Berenice

== P ==
- Giovanni Pacini (1796–1867): Alessandro nelle Indie, Amazilia, Bondelmonte, Carlo di Borgogna, Il corsaro, Lorenzino de' Medici, Maria, regina d'Inghilterra, Medea, Saffo, L'ultimo giorno di Pompei
- Fredrik Pacius (1809–1891): Kung Karls jakt, Prinsessan av Cypern
- Ferdinando Paer (1771–1839): Achille, Agnese, Camilla, I fuorusciti di Firenze, Leonora, Le maître de chapelle
- John Knowles Paine (1839–1906): Azara
- Giovanni Paisiello (1741–1816): Il barbiere di Siviglia, Le due contesse, Elfrida, Fedra, I filosofi immaginari, La Frascatana, I giuochi d'Agrigento, La modesta raggiratrice, La molinara, Nina, Nitteti, Pirro, Proserpine, Il re Teodoro in Venezia, Sismano nel Mogol
- Zakaria Paliashvili (1871–1933): Absalom and Eteri, Daisi, Latavra
- Selim Palmgren (1878–1951): Daniel Hjort
- Roxanna Panufnik (1968– ): The Music Programme
- Jorma Panula (1930– ): Jaakko Ilkka
- Gérard Pape (1955– ): Les Cenci, Ivan and Rena, A Little Girl Dreams of Taking the Veil, Monologue
- Ian Parrott (1916–2012): The Black Ram
- Thomas Pasatieri (1945– ): Before Breakfast, Black Widow, Calvary, La Divina, A Flea in her Ear, Flowers of Ice, Frau Margot, The Goose Girl, The Hotel Casablanca, Inés de Castro, Maria Elena, Padrevia, The Penitentes, The Seagull, Signor Deluso, Three Sisters, The Trial of Mary Lincoln, The Trysting Place, Washington Square, The Women
- Jiří Pauer (1919–2007): Zuzana Vojiřová
- Stephen Paulus (1949–2014): The Postman Always Rings Twice
- Carlo Pedrotti (1817–1893): Tutti in maschera
- Jorge Peña Hen (1928–1973): La Cenicienta
- Krzysztof Penderecki (1933–2020): The Devils of Loudun, Paradise Lost, Die schwarze Maske, Ubu Rex
- Manuel Penella (1880–1939): El gato montés
- Johann Christoph Pepusch (1667–1752): Thomyris, Queen of Scythia, The Beggar's Opera
- Davide Perez (1711–1778): Solimano
- Giovanni Battista Pergolesi (1710–1736): Adriano in Siria, Lo frate 'nnamorato, Livetta e Tracollo, L'Olimpiade, Il prigionier superbo, La serva padrona
- Jacopo Peri (1561–1633): Dafne, Euridice
- Giuseppe Persiani (c. 1799/1805–1869): Ines de Castro
- Giacomo Antonio Perti (1661–1756): L'incoronazione di Dario
- Wilhelm Peterson-Berger (1867–1942): Arnljot, The Doomsday Prophets
- Errico Petrella (1813–1877): Il carnevale di Venezia, Jone, I promessi sposi
- Albena Petrovic-Vratchanska (1965– ): The Blue Piano, The Dark, Ermesinde’s Long Walk, The Stone Feast / Don Juan 21, World of Dreams, Love & Jealousy opera diptych
- Hans Pfitzner (1869–1949): Der arme Heinrich, Das Christ-Elflein, Das Herz, Palestrina, Die Rose vom Liebesgarten
- François-André Danican Philidor (1726–1795): Blaise le savetier, Ernelinde, princesse de Norvège, Le maréchal ferrant, Tom Jones
- Astor Piazzolla (1921–1992): María de Buenos Aires
- Niccolò Piccinni (1728–1800): L'americano, Atys, La buona figliuola, La buona figliuola maritata, Catone in Utica, Didon, Le donne vendicate, Ercole al Termedonte, Iphigénie en Tauride, Roland
- Tobias Picker (1954– ): An American Tragedy, Emmeline, Fantastic Mr. Fox, Thérèse Raquin
- Willem Pijper (1894–1947): Helewijn, Merlijn
- Matthias Pintscher (1971– ): Thomas Chatterton
- Ildebrando Pizzetti (1880–1968): Fedra, Dèbora e Jaéle, Fra Gherardo, Lo straniero, L'oro, Ifigenia, Assassinio nella cattedrale, Clitennestra
- Robert Planquette (1848–1903): Les cloches de Corneville, Nell Gwynne, Rip Van Winkle
- Ludvík Podéšť (1921–1968): Když se Anička vdávala, Slepice a kostelník, Bez cymbálu nejsou hody, Tři apokryfy (Staré zlaté časy; Svatá noc; Romeo a Julie), Hrátky s čertem, Emílek a dynamit, Filmová hvězda
- Amilcare Ponchielli (1834–1886): Il figliuol prodigo, La Gioconda, I Lituani, Marion Delorme, I promessi sposi
- Nicola Porpora (1686–1768): Arianna in Nasso, Semiramide riconosciuta, Temistocle
- Giovanni Porta (1675–1755): Numitore, Ifigenia in Aulide
- Rachel Portman (1960– ): The Little Prince
- Francis Poulenc (1899–1963): Dialogues of the Carmelites, Les mamelles de Tirésias, La voix humaine
- Henri Pousseur (1929–2009): Votre Faust, Die Erprobung des Petrus Hebraïcus, Leçons d'Enfer, Don Juan à Gnide ou les Séductions de la Chasteté
- André Previn (1929–2019): A Streetcar Named Desire, Brief Encounter
- Sergei Prokofiev (1891–1953): Betrothal in a Monastery (The Duenna) (Obrucheniye v monastyre), The Fiery Angel (Ognenniy angel), The Gambler (Igrok), The Love for Three Oranges (Lyubov k tryom apelsinam), Maddalena, Semyon Kotko, The Story of a Real Man (Povest' o nastoyashchem cheloveke), War and Peace (Voyna i mir)
- Giacomo Puccini (1858–1923): La bohème, Edgar, La fanciulla del West, Gianni Schicchi, Madama Butterfly, Manon Lescaut, La rondine, Suor Angelica, Il tabarro, Tosca, Il trittico, Turandot, Le Villi
- Henry Purcell (1659–1695): Dido and Aeneas, Dioclesian, The Fairy-Queen, The Indian Queen, King Arthur
- Eduard Pütz (1911–2000): Riders to the Sea

== Q ==
- Joseph Quesnel (1746–1809): Colas et Colinette, Lucas et Cécile

== R ==
- Robin de Raaff (1968–): RAAFF, Waiting for Miss Monroe
- Henri Rabaud (1873–1949): Mârouf, savetier du Caire
- Sergei Rachmaninoff (1873–1943): Aleko, Francesca da Rimini, The Miserly Knight (Skupoy rytsar), Monna Vanna
- Väinö Raitio (1891–1945): The Daughter of Jephtha, Princess Cecilia, The King of Lydia, Väinämöinen's Proposal, The Two Queens
- Jean-Philippe Rameau (1683–1764): Acante et Céphise, Anacréon (1754), Anacréon (1757), Les Boréades, Castor et Pollux, Daphnis et Eglé, Dardanus, Les fêtes d'Hébé, Les fêtes de l'Hymen et de l'Amour, Les fêtes de Polymnie, Les fêtes de Ramire, La guirlande, Hippolyte et Aricie, Les Indes galantes, Io, Naïs, La naissance d'Osiris, Nélée et Myrthis, Les Paladins, Pigmalion, Platée, La princesse de Navarre, Les sibarites, Les surprises de l'Amour, Le temple de la Gloire, Zaïs, Zéphire, Zoroastre
- Einojuhani Rautavaara (1928–2016): Aleksis Kivi, Rasputin, Vincent, among others
- Maurice Ravel (1875–1937): L'enfant et les sortilèges, L'heure espagnole
- Fred Raymond (1900–1954): Geliebte Manuela, Maske in Blau, Saison in Salzburg
- Emil Reesen (1887–1964): Farinelli
- Steve Reich (1936– ): The Cave, Three Tales
- Johann Friedrich Reichardt (1752–1814): Brenno, Claudine von Villa Bella, Erwin und Elmire
- Aribert Reimann (1936–2024): Melusine, Lear, Die Gespenstersonate, Troades, Das Schloß, Medea
- Ottorino Respighi (1879–1936): Belfagor, La bella dormente nel bosco, La campana sommersa, La fiamma, Maria egiziaca
- Hermann Reutter (1900–1985): Saul, Der verlorene Sohn, Doktor Johannes Faust, Odysseus, Der Weg nach Freudenstadt, Don Juan und Faust, Der Tod des Empedokles, Die Brücke von San Luis Rey, Die Witwe von Ephesus, Hamlet
- Ernest Reyer (1823–1909): Salammbô, Sigurd
- Alfred Reynolds (1884–1969): Derby Day
- Emil von Reznicek (1860–1945): Donna Diana
- William Barnes Rhodes (1772–1826): Bombastes Furioso
- Federico Ricci (1809–1877) & Luigi Ricci (1805–1859): Crispino e la comare
- Rolf Riehm (1937—2026): Das Schweigen der Sirenen, Sirenen
- Ferdinand Ries (1784–1838): Die Räuberbraut
- Wolfgang Rihm (1952–2024): Faust und Yorick, Jakob Lenz, Die Eroberung von Mexico, Die Hamletmaschine, Oedipus, Séraphin, Dionysos
- Nikolai Rimsky-Korsakov (1844–1908): Christmas Eve, The Golden Cockerel (Zolotoy petushok), Kashchey the Deathless (Kashchey bessmertnïy), The Legend of the Invisible City of Kitezh and the Maiden Fevroniya (Skazaniye o nevidimom grade Kitezhe i deve Fevronii), The Maid of Pskov (Pskovityanka), May Night (Mayskaya noch), Mlada, Mozart and Salieri (Motsart i Sal'yeri), The Noblewoman Vera Sheloga (Boyarïnya Vera Sheloga), Pan Voyevoda, Sadko, Servilia (Serviliya), The Snow Maiden (Snegurochka), The Tale of Tsar Saltan (Skazka o Tsare Saltane), The Tsar's Bride (Tsarskaya nevesta)
- Giovanni Alberto Ristori (1692–1753): Calandro
- Arturo Rodas (1954– ) El árbol de los pájaros
- Oleksandr Rodin (1975– ) Kateryna
- Robert Xavier Rodriguez (1946– ): La Curandera, Frida
- Bernard Rogers (1893–1968): The Warrior
- Gonzalo Roig (1890–1970): Cecilia Valdés
- James Rolfe (1961– ): Beatrice Chancy
- Sigmund Romberg (1887–1951): The Desert Song, The New Moon, The Student Prince
- William Michael Rooke (1794–1847) Amilie, or the Love Test, Henrique
- Joseph Willard Roosevelt (1918–2008): And the Walls Came Tumbling Down
- Ned Rorem (1923–2022): Bertha, Miss Julie, Our Town, Three Sisters Who Are Not Sisters
- Luigi Rossi (1597–1653): Orfeo, Il palazzo incantato
- Gioachino Rossini (1792–1868): Adelaide di Borgogna, Adina, Armida, Aureliano in Palmira, Il barbiere di Siviglia, Bianca e Falliero, La cambiale di matrimonio, La Cenerentola, Ciro in Babilonia, Le comte Ory, Demetrio e Polibio, La donna del lago, Eduardo e Cristina, Elisabetta, regina d'Inghilterra, Ermione, L'equivoco stravagante, La gazza ladra, La gazzetta, L'inganno felice, L'italiana in Algeri, Maometto II (revised as Le siège de Corinthe), Matilde di Shabran, Mosè in Egitto, L'occasione fa il ladro, Otello, La pietra del paragone, Ricciardo e Zoraide, La scala di seta, Semiramide, Sigismondo, Il signor Bruschino, Tancredi, Torvaldo e Dorliska, Il turco in Italia, Il viaggio a Reims, William Tell, Zelmira
- Nino Rota (1911–1979): Il cappello di paglia di Firenze, I due timidi
- Jean-Jacques Rousseau (1712–1778): Le devin du village
- Albert Roussel (1869–1937): La naissance de la lyre, Padmâvatî, Le testament de la tante Caroline
- Joseph-Nicolas-Pancrace Royer (c. 1705–1755): Zaïde, reine de Grenade
- Anton Rubinstein (1829–1894): Christus, The Demon, Dmitry Donskoy, Feramors, Fomka the Fool, Die Kinder der Heide, Die Maccabäer, The Merchant Kalashnikov, Moses, Néron, Der Thurm zu Babel
- Poul Ruders (1949– ): The Handmaid's Tale
- John Rutter (1945– ): Bang!

== S ==
- Kaija Saariaho (1952–2023): L'amour de loin, Adriana Mater, Émilie
- Antonio Sacchini (1730–1786): Armida, Arvire et Évélina, Calliroe, Chimène, La contadina in corte, Creso, Dardanus, Œdipe à Colone, Renaud
- Francesco Sacrati (1605–1650): La finta pazza
- Shigeaki Saegusa (1942– ): Chushingura
- Camille Saint-Saëns (1835–1921): Ascanio, Déjanire, Étienne Marcel, Hélène, Henry VIII, Phryné, La princesse jaune, Samson et Dalila, Le timbre d'argent
- Theophrastos Sakellaridis (1883–1950): Hymenaios, The pirate, Perouzé
- Luis H. Salgado (1903–1977): Cumandá, El tribuno, El Centurión, Eunice, Escenas del Corpus
- Antonio Salieri (1750–1825): Armida, Axur, re d'Ormus, La cifra, Les Danaïdes, Europa riconosciuta, Falstaff, La fiera di Venezia, La grotta di Trofonio, Les Horaces, Palmira, regina di Persia, Prima la musica e poi le parole, Der Rauchfangkehrer, La secchia rapita, La scuola de' gelosi, Tarare
- Aulis Sallinen (1935– ): The Red Line, The King Goes Forth to France, The Horseman, Kullervo, The Palace, King Lear
- Erkki Salmenhaara (1941–2002): Portugalin nainen
- Spyridon Samaras (1861–1917): Flora mirabilis, Medgé, Lionella, La martire, La furia domata, Storia d'amore o La biondinetta, Mademoiselle de Belle-Isle, Rhea
- Giovanni Battista Sammartini (1700/1701–1775): Memet
- Sven-David Sandström (1942–2019): Jeppe: The Cruel Comedy
- Domenico Sarro (1679–1744): Achille in Sciro, Didone abbandonata, Partenope
- Giuseppe Sarti (1729–1802): Armida e Rinaldo, Didone abbandonata, Fra i due litiganti il terzo gode, Le gelosie villane, Giulio Sabino, Medonte, re di Epiro
- Antonio Sartorio (1630–1680): Adelaide, Giulio Cesare in Egitto, Orfeo
- Erik Satie (1866–1925): Geneviève de Brabant
- Henri Sauguet (1901–1989): Les caprices de Marianne, La chartreuse de Parme
- David Sawer (1961– ): From Morning to Midnight
- Ahmed Adnan Saygun (1907–1991): Özsoy
- Alessandro Scarlatti (1660–1725): Griselda, Mitridate Eupatore, Tigrane, Il trionfo dell'onore, Sedecia, Telemaco, Il Pirro e Demetrio
- Domenico Scarlatti (1685–1757): Berenice, regina d'Egitto
- Giuseppe Scarlatti (1718 or 18 June 1723–17 Aug 1777): L'isola disabitata
- Andrea Lorenzo Scartazzini (born 1971): Wut, Der Sandmann, Edward II.
- Benedikt Schack (1758–1826): Der Stein der Weisen
- Pierre Schaeffer (1910–1995): Orphée 53
- R. Murray Schafer (1933–2021): The Princess of the Stars
- Peter Schat (1935–2003): Labyrint, Houdini, Symposion
- Johann Baptist Schenk (1753–1836): Der Dorfbarbier
- Friedrich Schenker (1942–2013): Bettina
- Peter Schickele (P. D. Q. Bach) (1935–2024): The Abduction of Figaro
- Max von Schillings (1868–1933): Mona Lisa
- Tito Schipa (1889–1965): La Principessa Liana
- Ludwig Schmidseder (1904–1971): Melodie der Nacht, Die oder Keine, Frauen im Metropol, Abschiedswalzer
- Franz Schmidt (1874–1939): Notre Dame
- Alfred Schnittke (1934–1998): Life with an Idiot, Historia von D. Johann Fausten, Gesualdo
- Othmar Schoeck (1886–1957): Massimilla Doni, Penthesilea, Das Schloss Dürande, Venus, Vom Fischer un syner Fru
- Arnold Schoenberg (1874–1951): Erwartung, Die glückliche Hand, Von heute auf morgen, Moses und Aron
- Franz Schreker (1878–1934): Christophorus, Der ferne Klang, Die Gezeichneten, Irrelohe, Der Schatzgräber, Der Schmied von Gent, Der singende Teufel, Das Spielwerk
- Friedrich Schröder (1910–1972): Hochzeitsnacht im Paradies
- Franz Schubert (1797–1828): Alfonso und Estrella, Fierrabras, Die Verschworenen, Die Zwillingsbrüder
- Erwin Schulhoff (1894–1942): Flammen
- Gunther Schuller (1925–2015): The Visitation, The Fisherman and His Wife
- Andrew Schultz (1969– ): The Children's Bach
- Johann Abraham Peter Schulz (1747–1800): Athalie
- William Schuman (1910–1992): The Mighty Casey, A Question of Taste
- Robert Schumann (1810–1856): Genoveva
- Walter Schumann (1913–1958): John Brown's Body
- Joseph Schuster (1748–1812): Der Alchymist, oder Der Liebesteufel
- Heinrich Schütz (1585–1672): Dafne
- Anton Schweitzer (1735–1787): Alceste, Die Dorfgala, Rosamunde
- Laura Schwendinger (1962– ): Artemisia, Margaret in Love and War , Cabaret of Shadows
- Kurt Schwertsik (1935– ): Die Welt der Mongolen
- Salvatore Sciarrino (1947– ): Da gelo a gelo, Infinito nero, Lohengrin, Luci mie traditrici, Macbeth, Perseo ed Andromeda
- Antonio Scontrino (1850–1922): Matelda
- Cyril Scott (1879–1970): The Alchemist
- Peter Sculthorpe (1929–2014): Rites of Passage, Quiros
- Humphrey Searle (1915–1982): The Diary of a Madman
- Seedo (c. 1700–c. 1754): The Devil to Pay
- Alexander Serov (1820–1871): Judith, Rogneda, The Power of the Fiend
- José Serrano (1873–1941): La dolorosa, La canción del olvido
- Paolo Serrao (1830–1907): L'impostore, Leonora dei Bardi, Pergolesi, La Duchessa di Guisa, Il Figliuol Prodigo
- Roger Sessions (1896–1985): The Trial of Lucullus, Montezuma
- John Laurence Seymour (1893–1986): In the Pasha's Garden
- Rodion Shchedrin (1932–2025): Boyarina Morozova, Dead Souls, The Enchanted Wanderer, Levsha, Lolita, Not Love Alone,
- Bright Sheng (1955– ): Madame Mao, The Silver River
- William Shield (1748–1829): The Flitch of Bacon, Rosina
- Alice Shields (1943– ): Apocalypse
- Howard Shore (1946– ): The Fly
- Dmitri Shostakovich (1906–1975): The Gamblers (Igroki), Lady Macbeth of Mtsensk (Ledy Macbeth Mtsenskovo uyezda), Moscow, Cheryomushki, The Nose (Nos)
- Jean Sibelius (1865–1957): The Maiden in the Tower (Jungfrun i tornet), The Building of the Boat (Veneen luominen)
- Elie Siegmeister (1909–1991): The Plough and the Stars
- Roberto Sierra (1953– ): El mensajero de plata
- Sheila Silver (1946– ): The Thief of Love
- Christian Sinding (1856–1941): Der Heilige Berg
- Larry Sitsky (1934– ): De Profundis, The Fall of the House of Usher, Fiery Tales, The Golem, Lenz, Voices in Limbo
- František Škroup (1801–1862): Fidlovačka Dráteník (The Tinker)
- Antonio Smareglia (1854–1929): Nozze istriane, La falena, Oceàna
- Bedřich Smetana (1824–1884): The Bartered Bride (Prodaná nevěsta), The Brandenburgers in Bohemia (Braniboři v Čechách), Dalibor, The Devil's Wall (Čertova stěna), The Kiss (Hubička), Libuše, The Secret (Tajemství), The Two Widows (Dvě vdovy), Viola
- Dmitri Smirnov (1948–2020): Tiriel, Thel
- John Christopher Smith (1712–1795): The Fairies, The Tempest
- Julia Smith (1911–1989): Cynthia Parker
- Martin Smolka (1959– ): Nagano, Das schlaue Gretchen
- Ethel Smyth (1858–1944): The Boatswain's Mate, Der Wald, The Wreckers
- Ragnar Søderlind (1945– ): Olav Tryggvason
- Mikhail Sokolovsky (1756–1795): The Miller-Wizard, Cheat and Matchmaker
- Juan María Solare (1966– ): Veinticinco de agosto, 1983
- Temistocle Solera (1815–1878): Il contadino d'Agleiate (rev. as La fanciulla di Castelguelfo), Genio e sventura, La hermana de palayo, Ildegonda
- Carlo Evasio Soliva (1791–1853): La testa di bronzo o sia La capanna solitaria
- Edward Solomon (1855–1895): Billee Taylor, The Nautch Girl, Quite an Adventure, The Red Hussar, The Vicar of Bray
- Harry Somers (1925–1999): Louis Riel
- S. P. Somtow (Somtow Sucharitkul) (1952– ): Madana, Ayodhya, Mae Naak, Dan No Ura
- Stephen Sondheim (1930–2021): Sweeney Todd: The Demon Barber of Fleet Street
- Fernando Sor (1778–1839): Telemaco nell'isola di Calipso
- Pablo Sorozábal (1897–1988): La del manojo de rosas, La tabernera del puerto
- John Philip Sousa (1854–1932): Désirée, El Capitan
- Alexander Spendiaryan (1871–1928): Almast
- Niccola Spinelli (1865–1909): A basso porto
- Louis Spohr (1784–1859): Faust, Jessonda, Zemire und Azor
- Gaspare Spontini (1774–1851): Agnes von Hohenstaufen, Alcidor, Fernand Cortez, Milton, Nurmahal, Olimpie, La vestale
- Lewis Spratlan (1940–2023): Life Is a Dream
- Sigmund Theophil Staden (1607–1665): Seelewig
- Charles Villiers Stanford (1852–1924): The Canterbury Pilgrims, Much Ado About Nothing
- John Stanley (1712–1786): Teraminta
- Robert Starer (1924–2001): Apollonia
- Roman Statkowski (1859–1925): Maria, Philaenis
- Agostino Steffani (1653–1728): Amor vien dal destino, Henrico Leone
- Walter Steffens (born 1934): Eli, Under Milk Wood/Unter dem Milchwald
- Daniel Steibelt (1765–1823): Roméo et Juliette
- Wilhelm Stenhammar (1871–1927): Tirfing
- Rudi Stephan (1887–1915): Die ersten Menschen
- George Stephănescu (1843–1925): Sânziana şi Pepelea
- Roger Steptoe (1953– ): King of Macedon
- William Grant Still (1895–1978): Blue Steel, Troubled Island, A Bayou Legend
- Karlheinz Stockhausen (1928–2007): Atmen gibt das Leben, Licht (Donnerstag, Freitag, Samstag, Sonntag, Montag, Dienstag, Mittwoch)
- Petar Stojanović (1877–1957): Devojka na Mansardi, Die Herzog von Reichstadt, The Tiger (opera)
- Robert Stolz (1880–1975): Der Tanz ins Glück, Der verlorene Walzer
- Stephen Storace (1763–1796): Dido, Queen of Carthage, Gli equivoci, The Haunted Tower, The Iron Chest, Lodoiska, No song, no supper, The Pirates, The Siege of Belgrade, Gli sposi malcontenti
- Alessandro Stradella (1639–1682): Il Trespolo tutore
- Robert Strassburg (1915–2003): Chelm
- Oscar Straus (1870–1954): Bozena, The Chocolate Soldier (Der tapfere Soldat), Drei Walzer, Ein Walzertraum, Der letzte Walzer
- Johann Strauss II (1825–1899): Blindekuh, Cagliostro in Wien, Die Fledermaus, Eine Nacht in Venedig, Indigo und die vierzig Räuber, Der Karneval in Rom, Der lustige Krieg, Prinz Methusalem, Ritter Pázmán, Simplicius, Das Spitzentuch der Königin, Waldmeister, Wiener Blut, Der Zigeunerbaron
- Richard Strauss (1864–1949): Die ägyptische Helena, Arabella, Ariadne auf Naxos, Capriccio, Daphne, Elektra, Feuersnot, Die Frau ohne Schatten, Friedenstag, Guntram, Intermezzo, Die Liebe der Danae, Der Rosenkavalier, Salome, Die schweigsame Frau
- Igor Stravinsky (1882–1971): The Flood, Histoire du soldat (Istoria Soldata), Mavra, The Nightingale (Solovei), Oedipus rex, Perséphone, The Rake's Progress, Renard (Bayka pro Lisu, Petukha, Kota da Barana)
- Heinrich Strecker (1893–1981): Ännchen von Tharau
- Eugen Suchoň (1908–1993): Krútňava, Svätopluk
- Arthur Sullivan (1842–1900): With W. S. Gilbert: The Gondoliers, The Grand Duke, H.M.S. Pinafore, Iolanthe, The Mikado, Patience, The Pirates of Penzance, Princess Ida, Ruddigore, The Sorcerer, Thespis, Trial by Jury, Utopia, Limited, The Yeomen of the Guard; With others: The Beauty Stone, The Chieftain, The Contrabandista, Cox and Box, The Emerald Isle (with Edward German), Haddon Hall, Ivanhoe, The Rose of Persia, The Zoo, (with Henry Fothergill Chorley), The Sapphire Necklace
- Franz von Suppé (1819–1895): Banditenstreiche, Boccaccio, Fatinitza, Leichte Kavallerie, Die schöne Galathee
- Conrad Susa (1935–2013): The Dangerous Liaisons, Transformations
- Franz Xaver Süssmayr (1766–1803): Der Spiegel von Arkadien
- Heinrich Sutermeister (1910–1995): Romeo und Julia, Die schwarze Spinne
- Margaret Sutherland (1897–1984): The Young Kabbarli
- Donald Swann (1923–1994): Perelandra
- Giles Swayne (1946– ): Le nozze di Cherubino
- Albert Szirmai (1880–1967): Mágnás Miska, Mézeskalács, Princess Charming, Táncos Huszárok
- Karol Szymanowski (1882–1937): Hagith, King Roger (Król Roger)

== T ==
- Germaine Tailleferre (1892–1983): Du style galant au style méchant, Il était un petit navire
- Otar Taktakishvili (1924–1989): Mindia
- Joby Talbot (1971– ): Everest
- Josef Tal (1910–2008): Saul at Ein Dor, Amnon and Tamar, Ashmedai, Massada 967, The Temptation (Die Versuchung), The Tower (Der Turm), The Garden (Der Garten), Josef
- Louise Talma (1906–1996): The Alcestiad
- Eino Tamberg (1930–2010): Cyrano de Bergerac
- David Tamkin (1906–1975): The Dybbuk
- Tan Dun (1957– ): The First Emperor, Marco Polo, Peony Pavilion, Tea: A Mirror of Soul
- Sergei Taneyev (1856–1915): Oresteia
- Angelo Tarchi (1760–1814): L'archetiello, Ademira, Ariarate, Il conte de Saldagna
- Mikael Tariverdiev (1931–1996): Graf Cagliostro
- Vladimir Tarnopolsky (1955– ): The Three Graces
- Phyllis Tate (1911–1987): The Lodger
- John Tavener (1944–2013): Mary of Egypt
- Deems Taylor (1885–1966): The King's Henchman, Peter Ibbetson
- Pyotr Ilyich Tchaikovsky (1840–1893): Cherevichki, The Enchantress, Eugene Onegin, Iolanta, The Maid of Orleans (Orleanskaya deva), Mazeppa, The Oprichnik, The Queen of Spades (Pique Dame, Pikovaya dama), Undina, Vakula the Smith, The Voyevoda
- Georg Philipp Telemann (1681–1767): Orpheus, Pimpinone
- Oscar Ferdinand Telgmann (c. 1855–1946): Leo, the Royal Cadet
- Domènec Terradellas (1713–1751): Merope
- Claude Terrasse (1867–1923): Les travaux d'Hercule, Le sire de Vergy
- Jeanine Tesori (1961– ): Blue, Grounded
- Flavio Testi (1923–2014): Saül, Riccardo III
- Johann Theile (1646–1724): Adam und Eva
- Mikis Theodorakis (1925–2021): Kostas Karyotakis, Medea, Antigone, Electra
- Ambroise Thomas (1811–1896): La cour de Célimène, Hamlet, Mignon
- Arthur Thomas (1850–1892): Esmeralda
- Randall Thompson (1899–1984): Solomon and Balkis
- Virgil Thomson (1896–1989): Four Saints in Three Acts, Lord Byron, The Mother of Us All
- Francis Thorne (1922–2017): Mario and the Magician
- John Thow (1949–2007): Serpentina
- Ludwig Thuille (1861–1907): Lobetanz
- Ivo Tijardović (1895–1976): Mala Floramye, Splitski Akvarel
- Michael Tippett (1905–1998): The Ice Break, King Priam, The Knot Garden, The Midsummer Marriage, New Year, Robin Hood
- Camillo Togni (1922–1993): Blaubart
- Henri Tomasi (1901–1971): Don Juan de Mañara
- Michael Torke (1961– ): Strawberry Fields
- Tomás de Torrejón y Velasco (1644–1728): La púrpura de la rosa
- Charles Tournemire (1870–1939): Nittetis, Chryséis (Les dieux sont morts), Trilogie Faust – Don Quichotte – Saint François d’Assise, La légende de Tristan, Il poverello di Assisi
- Geoffrey Toye (1889–1942): The Red Pen
- Antonio Tozzi (1736–1812): La morte di Dimone
- Tommaso Traetta (1727–1779): Antigona, Armida, Ifigenia in Tauride, Ippolito ed Aricia, Le serve rivali, Sofonisba, I Tindaridi
- Cornel Trăilescu (1926–2019): Bãlcescu
- Eduard Tubin (1905–1982): The Parson of Reigi
- Joaquín Turina (1882–1949): Margot, Jardín de oriente
- Mark-Anthony Turnage (1960– ): Anna Nicole, Greek, The Silver Tassie, Twice Through the Heart
- Erkki-Sven Tüür (1959– ): Wallenberg
- Geirr Tveitt (1908–1981): Dragaredokko

== U ==
- Marco Uccellini (1603–1680): Li Eventi di Filandro Et Edessa
- Martin Andreas Udbye (1820–1889): Fredkulla
- Alfred Uhl (1909–1992): Der mysteriöse Herr X
- Viktor Ullmann (1898–1944): Der Kaiser von Atlantis
- José María Usandizaga (1887–1915): Las golondrinas, La llama, Mendi Mendiyan
- Francesco Uttini (1723–1795): Birger Jahl och Mechtilde, Thetis och Pélée

== V ==
- Nicola Vaccai (1790–1848): Giulietta e Romeo
- Fabio Vacchi (1949– ): La station thermale
- Vincenzo Valente (1855–1921): I granatieri
- Giuseppe Valentini (1681–1753): La finta rapita
- Jean Vallerand (1915–1944): Le Magicien
- Louis Varney (1844–1908): L'Amour mouillé, Les mousquetaires au couvent, Les petites brebis
- Ralph Vaughan Williams (1872–1958): Hugh the Drover, Sir John in Love, The Pilgrim's Progress, The Poisoned Kiss, Riders to the Sea
- Orazio Vecchi (1550–1605): L'Amfiparnaso
- Alexander Veprik (1899–1958): Toktogul (Токтогул) (1940), Toktogul (Токтогул) (1949)
- Giuseppe Verdi (1813–1901): Aida, Alzira, Aroldo, Attila, Un ballo in maschera, La battaglia di Legnano, Il corsaro, Don Carlos, I due Foscari, Ernani, Falstaff, La forza del destino, Un giorno di regno, Giovanna d'Arco, Jérusalem, I Lombardi alla prima crociata, I masnadieri, Luisa Miller, Macbeth, Nabucco, Oberto, Otello, Rigoletto, Simon Boccanegra, Stiffelio, La traviata, Il trovatore, Les vêpres siciliennes
- Alexey Verstovsky (1799–1862): Askold's Grave (Askol'dova mogila)
- Pauline Viardot (1821–1910): Cendrillon
- Gerard Victory (1921–1995): The Music hath Mischief, Chatterton
- Heitor Villa-Lobos (1887–1959): Izaht, Yerma
- Leonardo Vinci (c. 1696–1730): Artaserse, Didone abbandonata, Li zite 'ngalera
- Franco Vittadini (1884–1948): Anima allegra, Caracciolo, Fiammetta e l'avaro, La Sagredo, Nazareth
- Antonio Vivaldi (1678–1741): Ottone in villa, Orlando finto pazzo, Nerone fatto Cesare, Arsilda, regina di Ponto, La costanza trionfante, L'incoronazione di Dario, L'Olimpiade, Tieteberga, Armida al campo d'Egitto, Scanderbeg, Teuzzone, Tito Manlio, La verità in cimento, Ercole su'l Termodonte, Farnace, Orlando furioso, Argippo, Motezuma, Bajazet, Griselda, Dorilla in Tempe, La costanza trionfante degl'amori e de gl'odii
- Amadeo Vives (1871–1932): Doña Francisquita
- Giovanni Buonaventura Viviani (1638–1693): Astiage
- Claude Vivier (1948–1983): Kopernikus
- Roman Vlad (1919–2013): Il dottore di vetro
- Georg Joseph Vogler (1749–1814): Castore e Polluce, Der Kaufmann von Smyrna, Lampedo
- Hans Vogt (1911–1992): Die Stadt hinter dem Strom
- Andy Vores (1956– ): Freshwater, No Exit
- Alexander Vustin (1943–2020): The Devil in Love

== W ==
- Ignatz Waghalter (1881–1949): Der Teufelsweg, Mandragola, Jugend, Sataniel, Ahasaverus and Esther
- Richard Wagner (1813–1883): Die Feen, Der fliegende Holländer, Die Hochzeit, Das Liebesverbot, Lohengrin, Die Meistersinger von Nürnberg, Parsifal, Rienzi, Der Ring des Nibelungen (Das Rheingold, Die Walküre, Siegfried, Götterdämmerung), Tannhäuser, Tristan und Isolde
- Siegfried Wagner (1869–1930): Der Bärenhäuter
- Rudolf Wagner-Régeny (1903–1969): Das Bergwerk zu Falun, Die Bürger von Calais, Der Günstling, Prometheus
- Julian Wagstaff (1970– ): The Turing Test, Breathe Freely
- Rufus Wainwright (1973– ): Prima Donna, Hadrian
- Igor Wakhévitch (1948– ): Être Dieu
- Stewart Wallace (1960– ): The Bonesetter's Daughter
- William Vincent Wallace (1812–1865): The Amber Witch, Lurline, Maritana, The Desert Flower
- Joelle Wallach (1946– ): The King's Twelve Moons
- Hermann Wolfgang von Waltershausen (1882–1954): Else Klapperzehen, Oberst Chabert, Richardis, Die Rauhensteiner Hochzeit, Die Gräfin von Tolosa
- William Walton (1902–1983): The Bear, Troilus and Cressida
- Robert Ward (1917–2013): The Crucible
- Roger Waters (1943– ): Ça Ira
- Carl Maria von Weber (1786–1826): Abu Hassan, Die drei Pintos, Der Freischütz, Euryanthe, Oberon, Peter Schmoll und seine Nachbarn, Silvana
- Joseph Weigl (1766–1846): Die Schweizer Familie
- Kurt Weill (1900–1950): Die Bürgschaft, Down in the Valley, The Eternal Road (Der Weg der Verheissung), The Firebrand of Florence, Happy End, Der Jasager, Johnny Johnson, Knickerbocker Holiday, Der Kuhhandel (A Kingdom for a Cow, or Arms and the Cow), Lady in the Dark, Lost in the Stars, Love Life, One Touch of Venus, Der Protagonist, Rise and Fall of the City of Mahagonny (Aufstieg und Fall der Stadt Mahagonny), Royal Palace, The Seven Deadly Sins (Die sieben Todesünden), Der Silbersee, Street Scene, The Threepenny Opera (Die Dreigroschenoper), Der Zar lässt sich photographieren, The Flight across the Ocean
- Mieczysław Weinberg (1919–1996): The Portrait
- Jaromír Weinberger (1896–1967): Schwanda the Bagpiper, Milovaný hlas (The Beloved Voice), Lidé z Pokerflatu (The Outcasts of Poker Flat), Jarní bouře (Spring Storms), Na růžích ustláno (A Bed of Roses), Apropó, co dělá Andula? (By the Way, What Is Andula Doing?), Císař pán na třešních (The Emperor Lord of Cherries), Valdštejn (Wallenstein)
- Felix Weingartner (1863–1942): Genesius, Meister Andrea, Sakuntala
- Judith Weir (1954– ): Blond Eckbert, Heaven Ablaze in His Breast, King Harald's Saga, A Night at the Chinese Opera, The Vanishing Bridegroom, Armida
- Hugo Weisgall (1912–1997): Athaliah, Esther, Nine Rivers from Jordan, Six Characters in Search of an Author, The Stronger, The Tenor, Will You Marry Me?
- Dan Welcher (1948– ): Della's Gift
- John Weldon (1676–1736): The Judgement of Paris
- Egon Wellesz (1885–1974): Die Prinzessin Girnara, Die Bakchantinnen
- Felix Werder (1922–2012): Agamemnon
- Peter Westergaard (1931–2019): The Tempest, Alice in Wonderland
- Gillian Whitehead (1941– ): Outrageous Fortune
- Jörg Widmann (1973– ): Das Gesicht im Spiegel, Babylon
- Charles-Marie Widor (1844–1937): Maître Ambros
- Alec Wilder (1907–1980): The Lowland Sea, Sunday Excursion, The Opening
- Healey Willan (1880–1968): Deirdre
- Grace Williams (1906–1977): The Parlour
- Malcolm Williamson (1931–2003): English Eccentrics, The Happy Prince, Julius Caesar Jones, Lucky Peter's Journey, Our Man in Havana, The Valley and the Hill, The Violins of Saint-Jacques
- Charles Wilson (1931–2019): Héloise and Abelard, Psycho Red
- James Wilson (1922–2005): Letters to Theo, Grinning at the Devil
- Thomas Wilson (1927–2001): The Charcoal Burner, Confessions of a Justified Sinner
- Herbert Windt (1894–1965): Andromache
- Peter Winter (1754–1825): Babylons Pyramiden, Der Bettelstudent, Das Labyrinth, Leonardo und Blandine, Das unterbrochene Opferfest
- Peter Wishart (1921–1984): Two in the Bush, The Captive
- Erling Wold (1958– ): A Little Girl Dreams of Taking the Veil
- Hugo Wolf (1860–1903): Der Corregidor
- Ermanno Wolf-Ferrari (1876–1948): Il campiello, Le donne curiose, I gioielli della Madonna, I quatro rusteghi, Il segreto di Susanna, Sly
- Albert Wolff (1884–1970): L'oiseau bleu
- Stefan Wolpe (1902–1972): Zeus und Elida, Schöne Geschichten
- Paul Wranitzky (1756–1808): Oberon, König der Elfen
- Charles Wuorinen (1938–2020): Brokeback Mountain, Haroun and the Sea of Stories

== X ==
- Spyridon Xyndas (1812/1814–1896): Il Conte Giuliano, O ypopsifios vouleftis (The parliamentary candidate), O neogambros, I due pretendenti

== Y ==
- Kosaku Yamada (1886–1965): Kurofune (The Black Ships)
- Christopher Yavelow (1950– ): The Passion of Vincent van Gogh, Countdown
- Eugène Ysaÿe (1858–1931): Pier li Houyeû
- Sergei Yuferov (1865–?): Myrrha (Мирра), Yolande (Иоланда), Antoine et Cléopatre (Антоний и Клеопатра)
- Isang Yun (1917–1995): Sim Tjong

== Z ==
- Ivan Zajc (1832–1914): Nikola Šubić Zrinjski
- Riccardo Zandonai (1883–1944): I cavalieri di Ekebù, Conchita, Francesca da Rimini, Giulietta e Romeo, La farsa amorosa
- Carl Zeller (1842–1898): Der Obersteiger, Der Vogelhändler
- Alexander von Zemlinsky (1871–1942): Es war einmal, Eine florentinische Tragödie, Der König Kandaules, Der Kreidekreis, Sarema, Der Traumgörge, Der Zwerg
- Hans Zender (1936–2019): Stephen Climax, Don Quijote de la Mancha
- Otakar Zich (1879–1934): Preciézky
- Karl Michael Ziehrer (1843–1922): Der Fremdenführer, König Jérôme, Die Landstreicher
- Winfried Zillig (1905–1963): Die Windsbraut
- Bernd Alois Zimmermann (1918–1970): Die Soldaten
- Udo Zimmermann (1943–2021): Levin's Mühle, Der Schuhu und die fliegende Prinzessin, Weiße Rose, Die wundersame Schusterfrau
- Niccolò Antonio Zingarelli (1752–1837): Giulietta e Romeo, Ines de Castro, Pirro, re d'Epiro
- Heinrich Zöllner (1854–1941): Die versunkene Glocke (The Sunken Bell)
- Guglielmo Zuelli (1859–1941): Fata del Nord
- Manuel de Zumaya (1678–1755): Partenope
- Johann Rudolf Zumsteeg (1760–1802): Das Pfauenfest

== See also ==
- List of important operas
- List of operas by title
