= 1884 in music =

== Specific locations ==
- 1884 in Norwegian music

== Events ==
- September 27 – The Hungarian Royal Opera House in Budapest opens.
- December 30 – Anton Bruckner's Symphony No. 7 is premiered in Leipzig, bringing the composer his first great success.

== Bands formed ==
- Cory Band

== Published popular music ==
- "Oh My Darling, Clementine" w.m. Percy Montrose
- "The Coon's Salvation Army" by Sam Lucas
- "The Fountain in the Park" aka "While Strolling Through the Park One Day" w.m. Ed Haley
- "The Golden Wedding" m. Gabriel-Marie
- "Love's Old Sweet Song" w. George Clifton Bingham m. James Lynam Molloy
- "March of the Plumed Knight" by Charles B. Morrell & William Howard Doane
- "My Thoughts Are of Thee" by Sam Lucas
- "Otchi Tchorniya" by Y. P. Grebyonka & F. Hermann
- "Rest, Comrades, Rest (Memorial Hymn)" by O. B. Ormsby
- "Rock-a-bye Baby" w.m. Effie I. Canning
- "When the Heather Blooms Again" by Frances Jane Crosby & William Howard Doane

== Classical music ==
- Anton Bruckner – Te Deum (begun 1881)
- Frederic Hymen Cowen - Symphony No. 4 "Welsh"
- Henri Duparc – La vie antérieure
- Antonín Dvořák – Ballade in D minor
- César Franck – Prelude, Chorale, and Fugue
- Robert Fuchs – Symphony No. 1 in C
- Alexander Glazunov – String Quartet No. 2 Opus 10 in F major
- Gustav Mahler - Der Trompeter von Säckingen
- Richard Strauss – Symphony No. 2
- Peter Tchaikovsky - Orchestral Suite No. 3
- Hugo Wolf – String Quartet in D minor (begun 1878)

== Opera ==
Manon! avez-vous peur...On l'appelle Manon
From Manon (1884), performed by Enrico Caruso and Geraldine Farrar in 1912.

- Eduard Caudella – Hatmanul Baltag
- Luigi Mancinelli – Isora di Provenza
- Miguel Marqués – El reloj de Lucerna
- Jules Massenet – Manon
- Karl Millöcker – Gasparone
- Viktor Nessler – Der Trompeter von Säkkingen
- Giacomo Puccini – Le Villi
- Charles Villiers Stanford – The Canterbury Pilgrims
- Arthur Sullivan – Princess Ida (London Savoy Theatre January 5 for 246 performances)
- Arthur Sullivan – Princess Ida (Broadway Fifth Avenue Theatre February 11 for 48 performances)
- Peter Tchaikovsky - Mazeppa
- Felix Weingartner – Sakuntala

== Musical theater ==
- Adonis Broadway production opened at the Bijou Theatre on September 4 and ran for 603 performances
- The Beggar Student London production opened at the Alhambra Theatre on April 12 and ran for 112 performances
- The Grand Mogul London production

== Births ==
- January 13 – Sophie Tucker, singer
- February 22 – York Bowen, pianist and composer (died 1961)
- March 14 – Wintter Watts, composer of art songs (died 1962)
- March 17 – Alcide Nunez, clarinetist
- March 18 – Joe Burke, pianist, composer and actor (died 1950)
- March 26 – Wilhelm Backhaus, German pianist (died 1969)
- April 22 – Armas Launis, Finnish composer and ethnomusicologist (died 1959)
- April 23 – Jurgis Karnavičius, Lithuanian composer (died 1941)
- May 19 – Arthur Meulemans, composer (died 1966)
- May 27 – Max Brod, author, composer and journalist (died 1968)
- August 7 – Billie Burke, American actress and singer (d. 1970)
- August 13 – Edwin Grasse, composer and violinist (died 1954)
- September 6 – Emerson Whithorne (birth name Emerson Whittern), composer and historian (died 1958)
- September 17 – Charles Tomlinson Griffes, composer (died 1920)
- September 24 – Jonny Heykens, composer and orchestra leader (died 1945)
- October 6 – Oliphant Chuckerbutty, organist and composer (died 1960)
- November 1 – David Roitman, hazzan and composer (died 1943)
- November 6
  - May Brahe, composer and songwriter (died 1956)
  - Ludomir Rozycki, composer (d. 1953)
- November 19 – Norman Allin, English singer (d. 1973)
- November 23 – Guy Bolton, English librettist
- November 30 – Ture Rangström, composer (died 1947)
- December 29 – Foster Adolph Reynolds, brass instrument maker (died 1960 at work)
- date unknown – Alfred Reynolds, English composer (d. 1969)

== Deaths ==
- January 21 – Auguste Franchomme, cellist (dedicatee of works by Chopin)
- January 25 – Johann Gottfried Piefke, conductor and composer
- February 14 – Franz Wohlfahrt, violin teacher
- February 21 – John Pyke Hullah, composer and music teacher (b. 1812)
- March 14 – Franz Wohlfahrt, German violin teacher and composer (b. 1833)
- April 24 – Marie Taglioni, ballerina
- April 29 – Michael Costa, conductor and composer
- May 12 – Bedřich Smetana, composer (b. 1824)
- June 25 – Hans Rott, composer (b. 1858)
- June 8 – Henry Clay Work, US composer
- July 5 – Victor Massé, composer
- August 18 – Franz Seraphin Hölzl, composer (b. 1808)
- November 27 – Fanny Elssler, dancer
- December 4 – Alice Mary Smith, composer (b. 1839)
- date unknown – Velvel Zbarjer, Brody singer
