= List of zarzuelas by Miguel Marqués =

This is a list of zarzuelas by Miguel Marqués (1843–1918).

== List ==
Title	Genre (subtitle)	Acts	Librettists	Co-writers (composers)	Premiere date (YYYY-MM-DD)	Theatre	Refs
Verso y prosa		2	L.S.		1869	Zarzuela	
Los hijos de la costa	zarzuela	3	Luis Mariano de Larra	—	1871-02-10	Zarzuela	
Justos por pecadores	zarzuela	3	Luis Mariano de Larra	Cristóbal Oudrid	1871-10-25	Zarzuela	
Perla	zarzuela	1	Juan José Herranz	—	1871-12-02	Zarzuela	
La hoja de parra	pasatiempo cómico-lírico	1	Miguel Ramos Carrión	—	1873-09-02	Circo	
Covadonga					1874		
El maestro de Ocaña		3	Carlos Frontaura	—	1874-10-31	Zarzuela	
La Monja Alférez	zarzuela histórica	3	Carlos Coello y Pacheco	—	1875-11-24	Zarzuela	
Temores y sobreasaltos		3	Daniel Balaciart	—	1876 (Note: El Imparcial announced performances on December 23 and 24 (23, 24), but does not mark it a premiere (estreno).)	Zarzuela	
El anillo de hierro	drama lírico	3	Marcos Zapata Mañas	—	1878-11-07	Zarzuela	
El anillo de pelo (Note: A parody on El anillo de hierro, for which Luis Bonoris used some parts of Marqués's music. Marqués himself did not participate in this production.)	drama casi clásico	1	José A. García de Segovia, Narciso Díaz de Escovar	Luis Napoleón Bonoris	1879-02-01	Teatro Cervantes (Málaga)	
El santuario del valle	balada	2	Marcos Zapata Mañas	—	1879-02-24	Zarzuela	
Camoëns	drama lírico	1	Marcos Zapata Mañas	—	1879-02-24	Zarzuela	
Florinda	drama lírico-historico	3 (Note: With an epilogue.)	Joaquín Jiménez Delgado	—	1880-03-06	Zarzuela	
La mendiga del Manzanares	zarzuela	3	Enrique Prieto, Andrés Ruesga	—	1880-12-14	Apolo	
El alcaide de Toledo	drama lírico	3	Eugenio Olavarría y Huarte	—	1882-01-21	Zarzuela	
La cruz de fuego	melodrama	3	José Estremera	—	1883-10-08	Apolo	
El reloj de Lucerna	drama lírico	3	Marcos Zapata Mañas	—	1884-03-01	Apolo	
Un regalo de boda	drama lírico	3	Marcos Zapata Mañas	—	1885-12-05	Zarzuela	
La campana milagrosa	drama lírico	3	Marcos Zapata Mañas	Juan García Catalá	1888-03-03	Circo Price	
La llama errante		3	Javier de Burgos, Carlos Fernández Shaw, José Torres Reina	—	1888-02-25	Zarzuela	
¡Ese buitrago...!	juguete cómico-lírico	1	Constantino Gil	—	1889-02-20	Eslava	
El plato del día	extravagancia lírica	1	Andrés Ruesga, Salvador Lastra, Enrique Prieto	—	1889-04-20	Alhambra	
¡Al otro mundo!	pasillo cómico-lírico	1	Guillermo Perrín, Miguel de Palacios	Tomás Reig	1889-05-25	Apolo	
El diamante rosa	zarzuela de gran espectáculo	2	Guillermo Perrín, Miguel de Palacios	—	1890-01-25	Zarzuela	
Tila	juguete cómico-lírico	1	Eduardo Sáenz Hermúa, Antonio Liminiana	—	1890-03-04	Apolo	
Las ánimas			Eduardo Sáenz Hermúa		1890		
Magdalena	drama lírico	1	Felipe Lavín	—	1890-11-15	Apolo	
El motín de Aranjuez	episodio histórico-popular	2/1	Ángel Rodríguez Chaves, José Torres Reina	—	1890-11-21	Apolo	
Los tortolitos	juguete cómico-lírico	1	Constantino Gil	—	1891-05-23	Alhambra	
El monaguillo	zarzuela	1	Emilio Sánchez Pastor	—	1891-05-26	Apolo	
El zortzico	zarzuela	1	Emilio Sánchez Pastor	—	1891-07-23	Felipe	
El Dios chico		1	Ángel Rodríguez Chaves	—	1891-08-01	Tívoli (Madrid)	
El toque de rancho	zarzuela	1	Sinesio Delgado	Ramón Estellés	1891-08-01	Felipe	
Amores nacionales	apuntes para un viaje	1	Guillermo Perrín, Miguel de Palacios	Manuel Nieto	1891-11-13	Eslava	
El cañón	zarzuela de gran espectáculo	3	Guillermo Perrín, Miguel de Palacios	—	1891-12-22	Circo Price	
El centinela	sainete lírico	1	Emilio Sánchez Pastor	—	1892-01-20	Apolo	
Los redentores	juguete cómico-lírico	1	José Torres Reina	—	1892-04-02	Apolo	
La salamanquina	zarzuela cómica	1	Guillermo Perrín, Miguel de Palacios	—	1892-04-16	Eslava	
El castañar	juguete cómico-lírico	1	Eduardo Sáenz Hermúa, Antonio Liminiana	—	1892-07-21	Tívoli (Madrid)	
Fraternidad	viaje alegórico	1	F. Jacques	—	1892-11-12	Zarzuela	
Las mariposas	zarzuela cómica	1	Guillermo Perrín, Miguel de Palacios	—	1893-03-18	Apolo	
La procesión cívica		1	Emilio Sánchez Pastor, Sinesio Delgado	—	1893-06-13	Apolo	
El cornetilla	zarzuela cómica	1	Guillermo Perrín, Miguel de Palacios	—	1893-10-05	Eslava	
El abate San Martín	zarzuela	1	Guillermo Perrín, Miguel de Palacios	—	1893-12-11	Eslava	
Boda, tragedía y guateque, ó El difunto de Chuchita	sainete lírico de costumbres cubanas	1	Javier de Burgos	—	1894-01-09	Eslava	
El aquelarre	zarzuela de espectáculo extravagante		Sinesio Delgado	—	1894 (Note: González Freire dates this zarzuela 1894-10-10 (based on a note written by Delgado on this day and inlaid in the manuscript), which is incorrect: El Imparcial cites it neither on October 10, nor 11.)	Teatro del Príncipe Alfonso	
El santo milagroso	zarzuela	1	Emilio Sánchez Pastor	—	1894-12-07	Eslava	
El remendón			C.F.				
