= La Celestina (opera) =

Opera by Flavio Testi

La Celestina is an opera by Flavio Testi to a libretto by Renato Prinzhofer after La Celestina by Fernando de Rojas. It was first performed at the Maggio Musicale Fiorentino on 28 May 1963.

== Recording ==
- Fedora Barbieri, Magda Olivero, Maria Teresa Mandalari, Lino Puglesi, Mirto Picchi, Orchestra del Maggio Musicale Fiorentino, Gianandrea Gavazzeni 1962
