= Saül (opera) =

2003 opera by Flavio Testi

Saül is a French-language opera by Italian composer Flavio Testi based on the play by the same name by André Gide (Saül, 1903). The opera was premiered, and recorded, by Radio France in concert performance in 2003. It was first staged in Macerata, at the Teatro Lauro Rossi, in 2007.
