= Perla (zarzuela) =

Perla is a one-act zarzuela by Miguel Marqués for a libretto (in verse) by Juan José Herranz. It was staged for the first time on December 2, 1871 at the Teatro de la Zarzuela in Madrid.

== Roles ==
Role	Voice type	Premiere cast, 2 December 1871
Perla	soprano	Dolores Cortés
Clara	característica	Concepción Baeza
Olmedo		
Perchado	contralto	Arsenia Velasco
Chorus: gypsies of both sex; men

== Synopsis ==
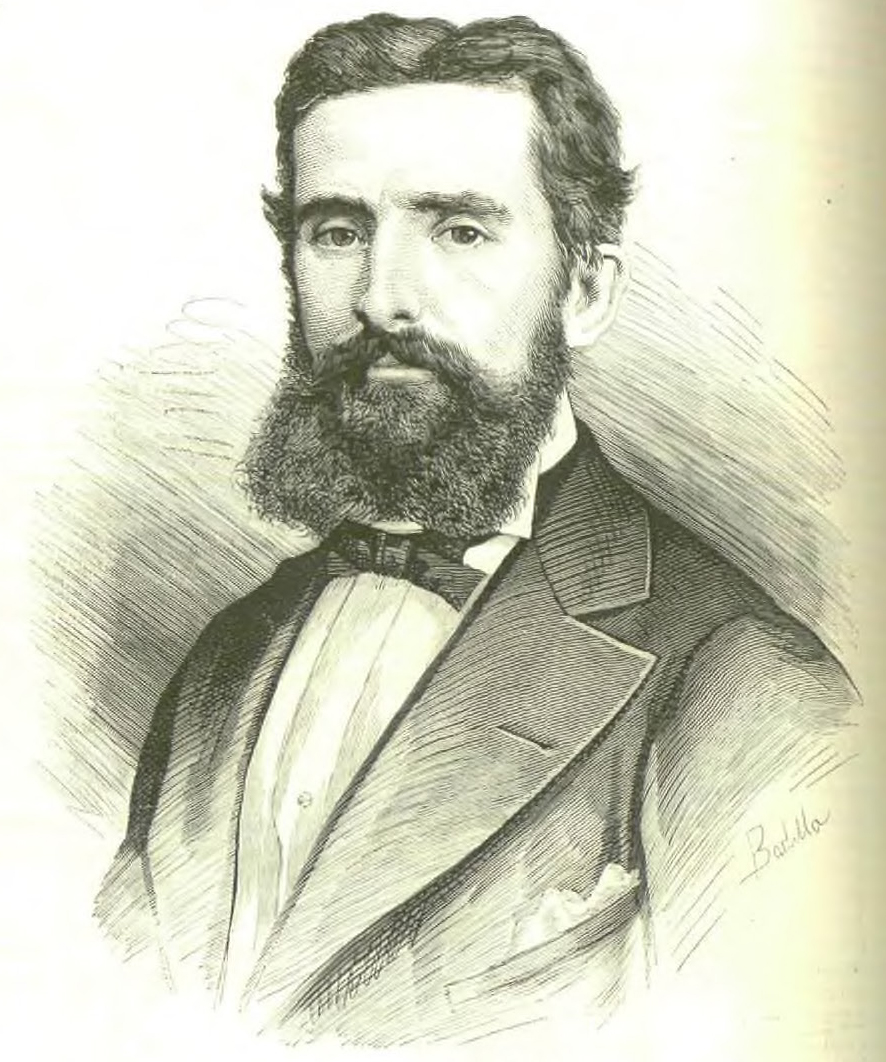
A picture of Marqués (La Ilustración Española y Americana, 1878)

The action takes place in a square of a 17th century Sevillian suburb. A young nobleman Olmedo pays mare Clara to help him arrange a date with the beautiful gypsy girl Perla, who refuses all men. The severe Perchado has raised her without telling anybody who were her parents, and she is watched over by him. Clara demands that Olmedo go away for the moment, but he hides himself in the nearby. A group of gypsies comes to the square praising Perla, who performs a song (bolero) about the birth of love in her heart. Olmedo approaches her and lets to read his hand. She says that his love is shared by the girl he loves. Full of happiness, Olmedo invites the whole company to his house (which is also in this square). Perchado insists that Perla stay outside with Clara. Olmedo promises Perla to return.

Clara tells the girl that the young man is a Valencian count, who came to Sevilla to gather some inheritance. She assumes that he owes his wealth to an accident passed years ago: El Chato, a gypsy, kidnapped a girl and vanished. Perla protests to this insinuations. Though not interested in richness, she has visions of luxurious being, like memories of another life. Olmedo comes back, and Clara leaves the two in order to look if Perchado approaches: the count is worried about him. The lovers express their feelings in a duo. Clara gives them a signal with cough, and they part.

Perchado scolds her, as she has inverted her office. She objects that if Perla gets married with count Olmedo, he would be rich. He gets struck when learning the young man's name and speaks of "a brother", but soon pulls himself together and asks her to take the gypsies to the square. While alone, he sings of his doubts: conscience forces him to flee from Sevilla with Perla, but the count's money could transform his life completely, though this would lead him to hell. The girl comes to tell him about her love, but he condemns this relationship and announces their instant depart without explaining her the reason for such a fierce attitude towards Olmedo.

The gypsies arriving, Perchado tells Perla she is now his prisoner. But Clara managed to notify Olmedo. In the following musical scene the gypsies turn out to be too drunk, and Perchado wants to go with the girl alone; but he is stopped by Olmedo, who comes with his men; he offers his wealth in exchange for Perla's hand; Perchado insists they abandon their relationship. The gypsies take the count's part. Perchado is compelled to make a revelation: when El Chato disappeared with the child, he fled with him; they were chased, and eventually the lad chose to throw the kid from a rock; Perchado had to kill him, and Perla is that girl, the sister of count Olmedo. Happily, Olmedo proves to be just a collateral descendant of the old count, and thus the problem is solved. Perchado praises the new countess and is joined by the others.

== Musical numbers ==
- Prelude
- Aquí está la gitana (Perla, Perchado, mixed chorus) — Bolero. Yo soy el ave pura (Perla, with chorus)
- Duo. ¡Enlazar nuestra suerte...! (Perla, Olmedo)
- Si yo dijera mi sentimiento (Perchado)
- Waltz (instrumental)
- No pretendas que haya fares (Perla, Clara, Olmedo, Perchado, mixed chorus)
- Final. Con mis hechizos y con mis danzas (Perla, chorus)
