= Wintter Watts =

American classical composer (1884–1962)

- Born: March 14, 1884; Cincinnati, Ohio
- Died: November 1, 1962 (aged 78); Brooklyn, New York
- Occupation: Composer

Wintter Haynes Watts (March 14, 1884 – November 1, 1962) was an American composer of art songs.

== Life and musical career ==
Watts was born in Cincinnati, Ohio, and his early studies were in painting, architecture, voice, and organ. He later studied at the Academy of Musical Art in New York City and in Florence, Italy. He won the Morris Loeb Prize in 1919 for his symphony Young Blood and the Prix de Rome in 1923. He returned to Italy a few years later and stayed until 1931, when he returned to the United States. After 1931 he fell into obscurity. Watts died aged 78 in Brooklyn, New York.

== Musical works ==
Watts composed around 70 songs for voice and piano in the years between 1906 and 1924. Most were published individually by Oliver Ditson or G. Schirmer. The songs were highly esteemed in their day, and Upton praised them for their distinctly 'American' sound. His most important song cycle is his Vignettes of Italy, nine songs from 1919, settings of poems by Sara Teasdale reflecting on various Italian locations and their associated emotional recollections. Many important singers performed his songs in concert, most notably Kirsten Flagstad and John McCormack, to whom Watts dedicated several songs. None of his other music was ever published.

== Published songs ==
- Three Songs, John Church Co., 1906
1. Love's Life (R. B. Butler)
2. A Drop o' Dew (H. Canfield)
3. The Joy of Man (Wanting) (unknown author)
- Three Songs, John Church Co., 1906
1. Clover (W. Bynner)
2. Admonition—Roses and Thorns (R. W. Gilder)
3. The Song of the Wind (N. E. Barnhart)
- The Joy of Man, Op. 2, no. 1 (Marshall Pancoast), John Church Co., 1908
- Four Songs, Op. 3. G. Schirmer, 1908
1. A Hope (W. Watts)
2. My World (Richard Watson Gilder)
3. The Stairway (Richard Watson Gilder)
4. The Difficulty (after Heine)
- Two Poems by A. Symons, Op. 4. G. Schirmer, 1908
1. Dreams (Arthur Symons)
2. During Music (Arthur Symons)
- Another Day, (unknown author), John Church Co., 1909
- Dinna Ask Me (Dunlop), G. Schirmer, 1909
- Locations (Tom Hall), John Church Co., 1909
- The Ocean Tramp (L. Hope), G. Schirmer, 1909
- Five Songs, G. Schirmer, 1910
1. Alone (words from the Spanish)
2. Home (D. Greenwell)
3. It isn't the Thing You Do, Dear (unknown author)
4. Oh, Call it by some Better Name (Thomas Moore)
5. Surf Song (L. Hope)
- Blue are Her Eyes (Mary MacMillan), Oliver Ditson, 1913
- The Boat of My Lover (D. M. M. Craik), Oliver Ditson, 1913
- Green Branches (Fiona MacLeod), Oliver Ditson, 1913
- Hushing Song (Fiona MacLeod), Oliver Ditson, 1913
- Only Once, Love (R. W. Gilder), Oliver Ditson, 1913
- Wood Song (Eugene Lee-Hamilton), Oliver Ditson, 1913, T.I.S. Reprint, 1998
- When I Wake (Anonymous), Oliver Ditson, 1916, T.I.S. Reprint, 1998
- Two Songs, G. Schirmer, 1918
1. Like Music on the Waters (Lord Byron)
2. Barcarole (Pai Ta-shun)
- Love Me (Sara Teasdale), unknown publisher, 1919
- Pierrot (Sara Teasdale), unknown publisher, 1919
- The Poet Sings (Richard LeGallienne), Oliver Ditson, 1919 (dedicated to John McCormack)
- When Beauty Grows (unknown author), unknown publisher, c. 1919
- Vignettes of Italy (Sara Teasdale), Oliver Ditson, 1919
1. Addio
2. Naples
3. Capri (Isle of Beauty)
4. Night song at Amalfi
5. Ruins of Paestum
6. From a Roman Hill
7. Ponte Vecchio, Florence
8. Villa Serbelloni, Bellaggio
9. Stresa
- Five Songs, G. Schirmer, 1919
1. Beloved, it is Morn (E. H. Hickey)
2. The Mother's Song (C. R. Robertson)
3. Golden Rose (Grace Hazard Conkling)
4. Utopia (Frances Turner Palgrave)
5. Magic (Harriet Morgan)
- Falmouth Town (Dramatic Ballad for Baritone) (William Ernest Henley), G. Schirmer, 1921
- Tryste Noël (Louise Imogen Guiney), unknown publisher, 1921
- Wings of Night (Sara Teasdale), G. Schirmer, 1921
- Joy (Sara Teasdale), G. Schirmer, 1922 (dedicated to John McCormack)
- Three Lyric Poems, G. Schirmer, 1922
1. With the tide (Edward J. O'Brien)
2. Transformation (Jessie B. Rittenhouse)
3. The nightingale and the rose (William Ernest Henley)
- A Little Page's Song (13th century, William Alexander Percy's Reliques), Ricordi, 1922
- The Little Shepherd's Song (13th century, William Alexander Percy's Reliques), Franco Colombo, Ricordi, 1922
- Bring Her Again to Me (Williams Ernest Henley), G. Schirmer, 1923
- Intreat Me not to Leave Thee (Sacred, Book of Ruth), G. Schirmer, 1923
- Two Songs by Sara Teasdale, G. Schirmer, 1923
1. Only A Cry (Sara Teasdale)
2. Let it be Forgotten (Sara Teasdale)
- Only and Forever (William Ernest Henley), G. Schirmer, 1923
- A White Rose (John Boyle O'Reilly), G. Schimer, 1923
- Wild Tears (Louise Imogen Guiney), G. Schirmer, 1923
- Three Songs for low voice, G. Schirmer, 1924
1. Song is so old (H. Hagedorn)
2. Miniver Cheevy (Edwin Arlington Robinson)
3. Dark Hills (Edwin Arlington Robinson)
- Circles, song cycle (texts by Watts?), 1932, arr. string quartet, 1936
- Exile (unknown author), Galaxy Music, 1936
- That Little Word No (unknown author), Galaxy Music, 1938
- Birdeen (Fiona MacLeod), unpublished, 1948
- In Silhouette (words and music by Watts), unknown publisher and date

== Larger musical works ==
- Incidental music for The Double Life (M. R. Rinehart), 1906
- Young Blood, symphony/tone-pageant, 1919
- Alice in Wonderland, opera (R. B. Butler, after Lewis Carroll), 1920
- Two Etchings for Orchestra, 1922
- Bridal Overture
- Pied Piper, opera
- The Piper, symphonic poem, 1927
