= Flavio Testi =

Italian composer (1923–2014)

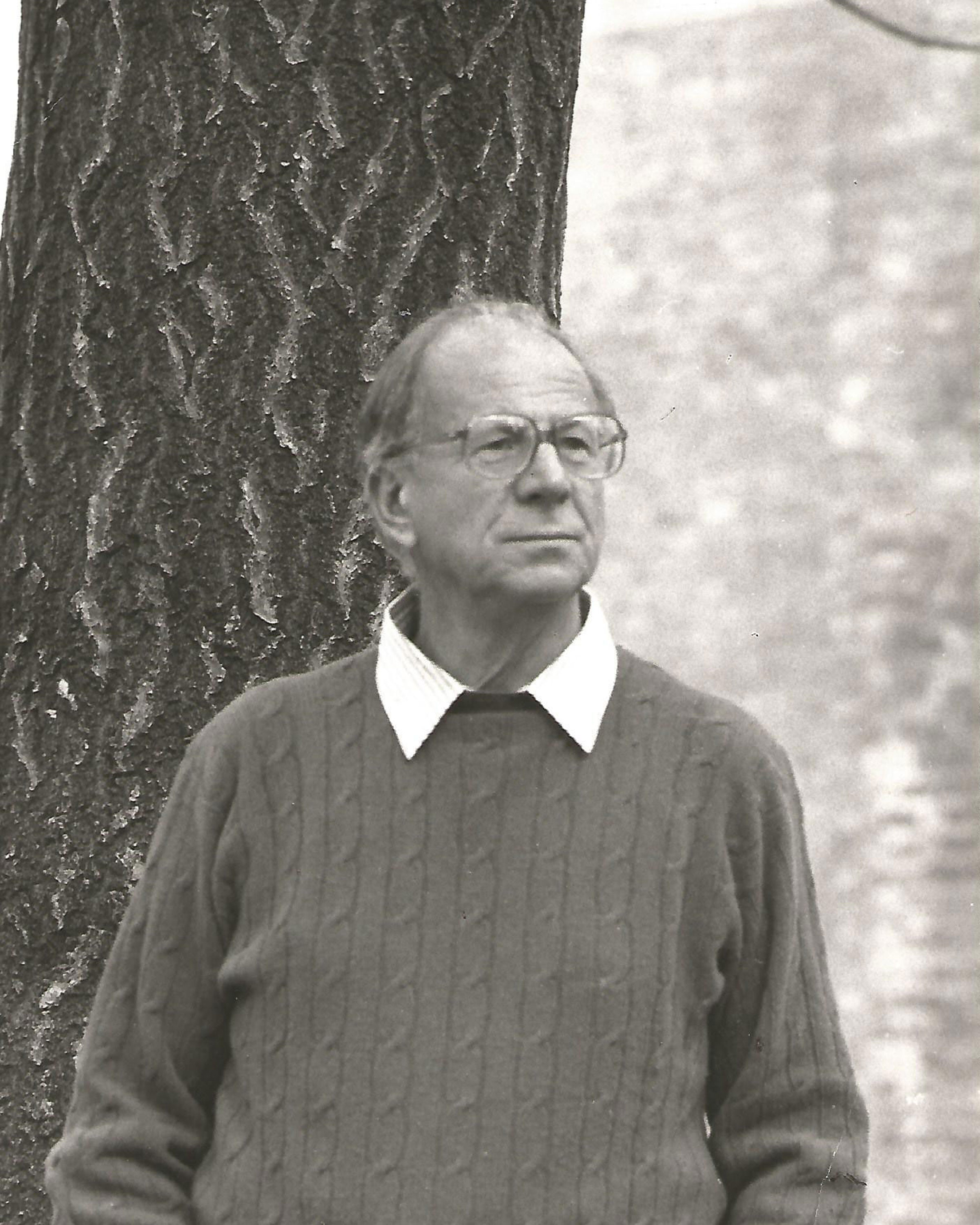

Flavio Testi (4 January 1923 in Florence – 14 January 2014 in Milan) was an Italian composer of contemporary classical music and musicologist.

== Biography ==
He studied with Giulio Cesare Gedda and Luigi Perrachio at the Turin Conservatory, and took an arts degree at Milan University (1951). He then worked for Suvini Zerboni and Ricordi while also composing, pursuing his interest in music history and working on various radio projects for the RAI. From 1972 he devoted himself to educational activities, teaching music history at the Padua Conservatory and then taking up teaching posts at the Milan Conservatory and Florence Conservatory.

== Musical style and influence ==
As a composer, Testi's music has been strongly influenced by the works of Stravinsky along with his own dramatic sensibility. This is particularly evident in his earlier orchestral works such as Concerto (1954) and Divertimento (1956).

His La crocifissione premièred at La Scala in 1954 to great acclaim. The expressiveness of work was particularly admired and the composer followed similar style in his Stabat mater (1957) and New York oficina y denuncia (1964), the latter of which denounced the dehumanizing environment of the modern metropolis. The work coincided with the Testi's conversion to the Marxism, and was followed by other compositions highlighting social and political concerns, including the Neruda setting Canto a las madres de los milicianos muertos (1967) and Cori di Santiago (1975).

Testi's operas evolve towards junctures of violent scenic-musical realism. L’albergo dei poveri (1966) displays a clearly characteristic attitude of rough dramatic purpose, confirmed in Il sosia (1981) and Riccardo III (La Scala, 1987), works which probe intensely into the psychology of their characters.

In general Testi's style, rather than adhering to the radicalisms of the post-Webern avant garde, re-elaborates and reflects, not without eclecticism, certain crucial 20th-century achievements, from Stravinsky and Bartók to early Schoenberg.

His last opera, Mariana Pineda, premiered at the Theater Erfurt, Germany, on September 8, 2007.

=== Works ===
- Il furore d'Oreste (Bergamo, Teatro Donizetti, 1956);
- La Celestina (Florence, Teatro della Pergola, 1963);
- L'Albergo dei Poveri (Milan, Piccola Scala, 1966);
- Il Sosia (Milan, Piccola Scala, 1981);
- Riccardo III (Milan, Teatro alla Scala, 1987);
- La brocca rotta (Bologna, Teatro Comunale, 1997);
- Saül (Paris, Radio France, in forma di concerto, 2003; Macerata, Teatro Lauro Rossi, in forma scenica, 2007);
- Mariana Pineda (Theater Erfurt, Germany, 2007).

== Awards ==
- 2010: Gonfalone d'Argento

== Discography ==
- Saul (opera)
- La Celestina (opera)

== Sources ==
- Raffaele Pozzi. The New Grove Dictionary of Opera, edited by Stanley Sadie (1992). ISBN 0-333-73432-7 and ISBN 1-56159-228-5
