= El zortzico =

El zortzico (The Zortziko) is a 1-act zarzuela by Miguel Marqués for a libretto (in prose) by Emilio Sánchez Pastor. It was first staged on 23 July 1891 at the Teatro Felipe in Madrid.

== Roles ==
Role	Voice type	Premiere cast, 23 July 1891
Magdalen		Señorita Campos
Ramona	does not sing	Señora Vidal
Josecho		José Mesejo
Chiquivar		Rodríguez
Urbieta		Soler
Echea	does not sing	Jerez
A miquelet sergeant	does not sing	Ruesga
The alcalde		Castro
A miquelet	does not sing	Vásquez
Chorus: miquelets, oarswomen, fishers, Carlist soldiers

== Synopsis ==
The zarzuela takes place in a square of a small town Pasajes in the North of Spain during the Third Carlist War (1874). The town is occupied by the liberals (they are called miquelets), while the mounts surrounding it are filled with the Carlists. The action begins with a dialogue between the sacristan Josecho and a miquelet sergeant, who considers him to be a Carlist spy.

Accompanied by fishermen, in a boat comes Chiquivar (No. 2), a reminder whose daughter Magdalen saved captain Urbieta from a battle, when he was wounded. For her bravery the oarswoman is to be decorated this evening with a Cross of Military Merit, and a fest will be arranged. Josecho gave Chiquivar a loan to buy the very boat with which Magdalen performed the feat, and now his wife Ramona wants the money back by the next morning. Urbieta announces to Chiquivar there will be a secret sally against the Carlists this evening. He also speaks of his intention to marry Magdalen, if he comes back alive. Chiquivar knew nothing of their love, but agrees fain with such an alliance.

Josecho meets Magdalen and asks her to repay the money. He also suggests that she come alone after the fest to the square: if she does this, he will give her Chiquivar's voucher and they will have to pay nothing. Magdalen agrees. Enters Urbieta. In a trio the lovers are accompanied by comic prayers of Josecho, who stays in some distance; the captain tells the girl of the forthcoming sally; she promises to pray and sings an ancient zortziko which he likes (No. 3). Ramona comes to ask Magdalen about the money. While Urbieta offers Josecho to repay Chiquivar's debt, the girl tells Ramona about the sacristan's indecent plan. Josecho refuses to take the captain's money, at least now.

The festivities commence, and a procession of fishermen and oarswomen accompany Magdalen to the alcalde, who decorates her with the Cross in the middle of the square; Josecho rings the church bells diligently to please the girl (No. 4). The crowd proceeds to the town hall (No. 4bis). The Carlist colonel Echea arrives in a boat and is welcomed by Josecho. He arrived to abduct the newly decorated girl to the general. The sacristan decides that by losing the less he will gain the more, and tells the colonel she will come to the square alone. Echea goes back to the boat, and Josecho hides on a tree. While there, he listens to Urbieta and the sergeant's talk about the sally: they want to dispose some lanterns on this tree to make the Carlists fire in a wrong direction in case they get noticed.

Instead of Magdalen, to the square comes Ramona dressed like an oarswoman. Josecho notices nothing, and she is snatched by the Carlists. Enters Chiquivar with a lantern. In a comic duet the two men scold each other (No. 6). Josecho asks him where Magdalen is; he can not find her at home. The alcalde says someone saw two carlists abducting an oarswoman. The crowd requires death for Josecho. Happily, soon comes Magdalen with Urbieta: with the army of the liberals approaching the region the Carlists fled away. Finally gets into the square Ramona: Echea realized the error and gave her to his people, who threw her into the sea. She was rescued by Urbieta. Ramona forgives Magdalen Chiquivar's debt. A festive chorus completes the piece (Finale).

== Musical numbers ==
- No. 1. Prelude
- No. 2. ¿Qué pasa? ¿Qué ocurre que tiran los carcas? (Chiquivar, male chorus)
- No. 3. Hay que tener mucha atención (Magdalen, Urbieta, Josecho)
- No. 4. Esta es la hora de la fiesta — Barcarola. Nuestro encanto y nuestra gloria (mixed chorus, with Magdalen, Chiquivar, Urbieta, the alcalde)
- No. 4bis. Vivan las bateleras (mixed chorus)
- No. 5. Lo mismo que la espuma (mixed chorus, behind the scenes)
- No. 6. ¿Cómo no te hallas en fiesta? (Chiquivar, Josecho)
- Finale. Vivan las bateleras (Magdalen, Chiquivar, Urbieta, mixed chorus)
