= El reloj de Lucerna =

Zarzuela by Miguel Marqués (1884)

El reloj de Lucerna (The Clock of Lucerne) is a 3-act zarzuela (drama lírico) by Miguel Marqués for a libretto (in verse) by Marcos Zapata Mañas, dedicated to Miguel Ramos Carrión. It was first staged at the Teatro Apolo in Madrid on 1 March 1884. A modern revival was attempted by Ópera XXI (Spain) in April 2018.

== Roles ==
Role	Voice type	Premiere cast, 1 March 1884	Modern cast (Ópera XXI), 7 April 2018
Matilde, Gésner's widow	soprano	Elisa Zamacois	Marga Cloquell
Fernando, Matilde's son	soprano	Almerinda Soler di Franco	Maia Planas
Celia, Fernando's cousin	soprano	Gabriela Roca	Natalia Salom
Réding, Swiss veteran	baritone	Enrique Ferrer	Tomeu Bibiloni
Gualterio, master of Lucerne	bass	Miguel Soler	Pablo López
Gastón, a watchmaker	comic tenor	Guerra	Antoni Comas
Chorus:patricians, soldiers, pages, townsmen

== Background and performance history ==
El reloj de Lucerna gained much success. By the end of May 1884 it had been staged for 55 times, while the most popular zarzuela of Teatro Apolo of that season, San Franco de Sena by Emilio Arrieta, was performed for only 34 times.

== Synopsis ==
The zarzuela is placed in mid-17th century Switzerland.
