= Miguel Marqués (composer) =

Spanish composer and violinist

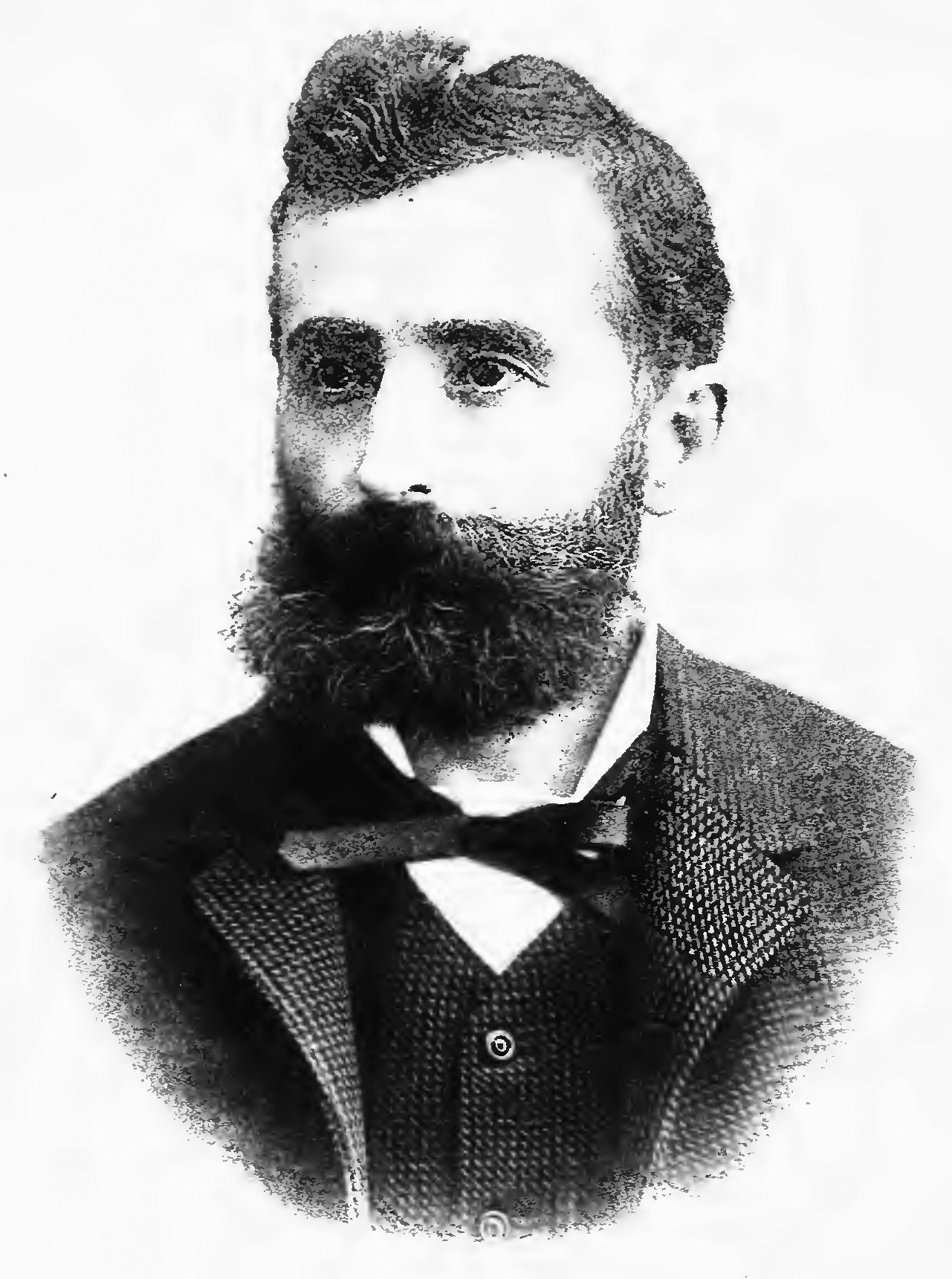
A picture of Marqués (from a Zozaya edition of El reloj de Lucerna)

Pedro Miguel Juan Buenaventura Bernadino Marqués y García (20 May 1843 – 26 February 1918) was a Spanish composer and violinist.

== Life ==
He was born in Palma, Majorca, the son of a chocolate maker. By the age of four he was already showing unusual musical talent, and by eleven he was playing violin for a Palma opera company, for which he wrote a Fantasía para violin which enjoyed a notable triumph. Between 1859 and 1863 family finance enabled him to study in Paris, after 1861 as a violinist at the Paris Conservatoire with Massard. In 1863 he was admitted to the orchestra of the Théâtre Lyrique, and began studying composition, and instrumentation with Hector Berlioz.

He returned to Majorca when called up to his military service, but in 1866 he resumed his studies at the Madrid Royal Conservatory, studying Violin with Monasterio and Composition with Emilio Arrieta whilst playing in the orchestra of the Teatro de la Zarzuela. After 1878 he was Inspector of the National Music Schools. He also taught singing at the Foundling Girls' School in Madrid, and published a handbook for violin teachers. In 1894 he retired to his home city of Palma. He published some philosophical books like Dios y la inmortalidad del alma. He died there in 1918 aged 74.

Of his five symphonies only the Third was printed during his lifetime. The whole cycle has been edited by Ramón Sobrino in 1993–2003. It was recorded by José Luis Temes, but this album is not released yet.

== Works ==
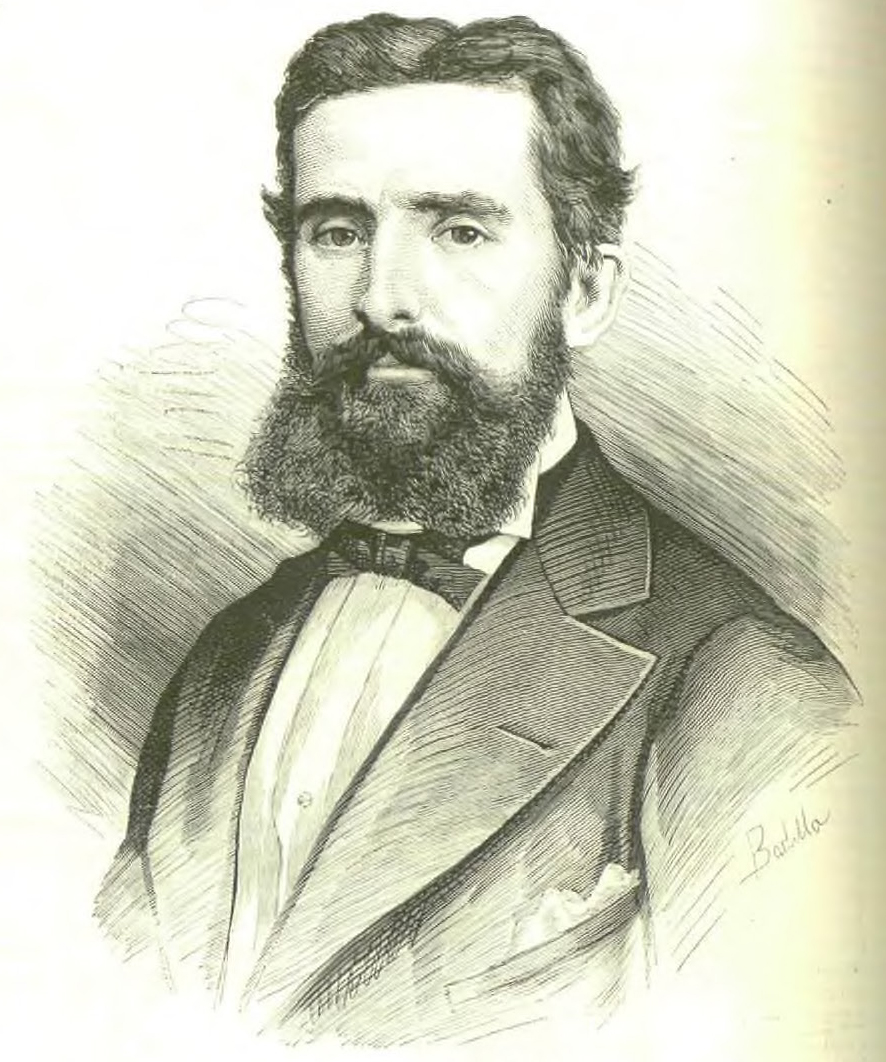
A picture of Marqués (La Ilustración Española y Americana, 1878)

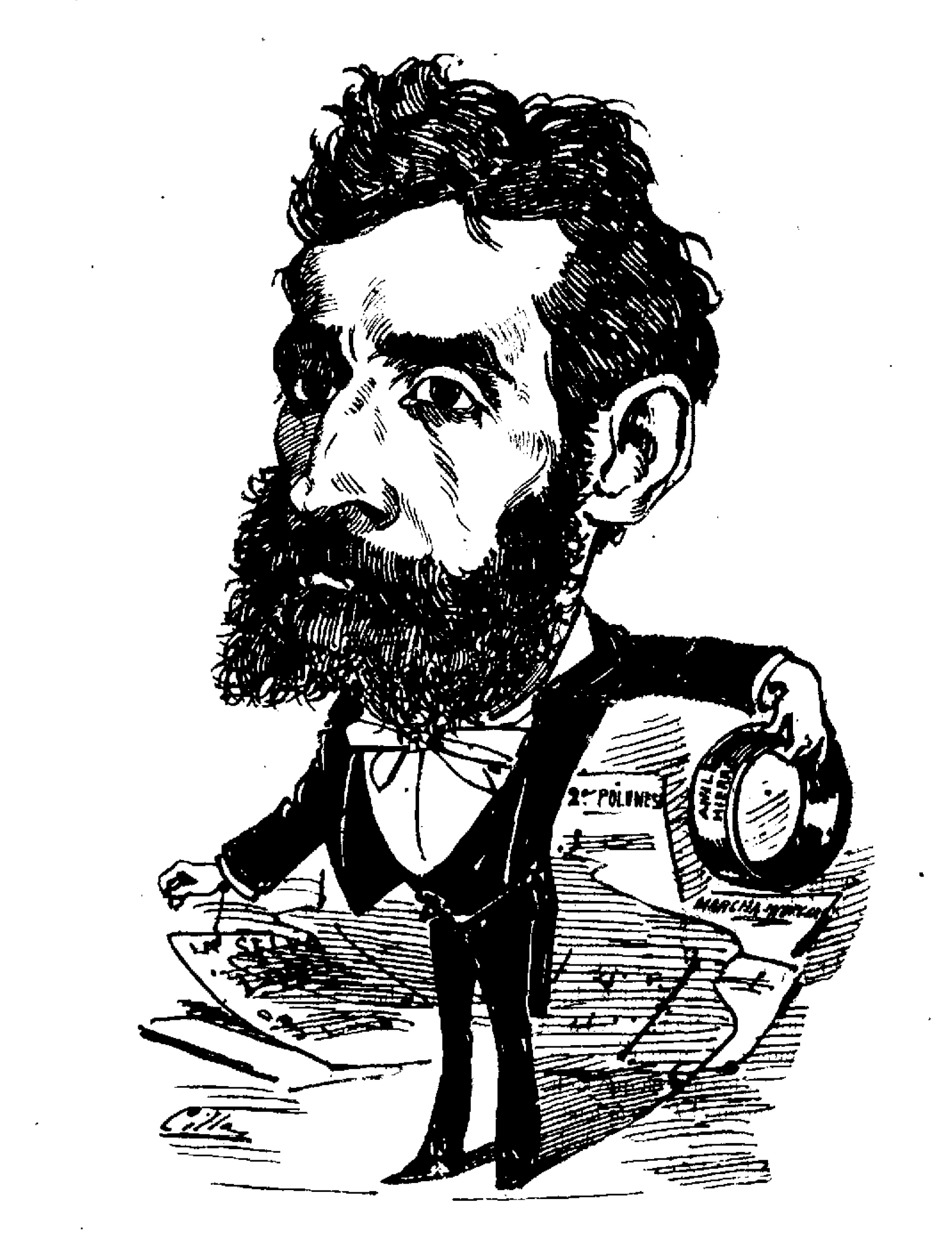
A caricature of Marqués (Madrid Cómico, 1881)

Stage works

- List of zarzuelas by Miguel Marqués
- El desengaño de un sueño, incidental music to a 5-act drama by Pedro Calderón de la Barca (1876, Teatro Apolo)

Choral

- Mis plegarias íntimas, oratory (1911), consists of 5 movements (Jesús de Nazaret; Jesús bendito; [Adagio for violin and piano]; Esplendorosa luz; Himno al Omnipotente) and El último adiós

Symphonies and symphonic pieces

- Symphony No. 1 in B flat major (1869)
- Symphony No. 2 in E flat major (1870)
- Una noche en la caleta (1871)
- Symphony No. 3 in B minor, Op.30 (1876)
- La selva negra, overture (1873)
- Symphony No. 4 in E major (1878)
- Symphony No. 5 in C minor (1880)
- Gran fantasía para orquesta y banda militar sobre motivos de zarzuelas modernas (1880)
- La cova del Drach (symphonic poem on Mallorcian themes, 1904)
- La vida, symphonic poem (1906); consists of 3 movements with an introduction (Allegro, Adagio, Marcha fúnebre)
- En la Alhambra, little poem, or suite; consists of 3 movements (Noche embriagadora; Danza de odaliscas; Marcha de héroes al combate)
- Oceánica, symphonic poem; consists of 3 movements (Overtura; Andante tranquillo; Vivace scherzando)
- Concert overture in C minor
- Scherzo in C minor
- Overture in C major (lost?)

Marches and polonaises

- Gran marcha de concierto No. 1 in C minor (1871)
- Gran marcha de concierto No. 2 (1873)
- Polonesa de concierto No. 1 in G major (ca.1872)
- Polonesa de concierto No. 2 in D major, Op. 17 (ca.1874)
- Polonesa de concierto No. 3 in A major (ca.1875)
- Gran marcha nupcial (1878)
- Polonesa de concierto No. 4 in B♭ major (ca.1880)
- Heroica, Marcha de concierto No. 4 (1882)
- Polonesa de concierto No. 5 in E major
- Polonesa de concierto No. 6 in A major (lost?)

Concertante

- Violin «Concerto» in E minor

Chamber

- Fantasía for violin and piano
- Theme and variations, for violin and piano
- Adagio in C major, for a quintet

Other

- La canción del marinero, melodia (1872)
- Primera lágrima (1872, originally for orchestra; a piano arrangement published in 1878)
- La mariposa
- Enriqueta, recull de valsos (1875)
- Obertura (for wind band, c.1900)
- Ave Maria for voice and organ (1911)
- A magna inmortalidad, Op. 111(1915)
- ¡Gloria a Mallorca!, Op. 112 (1915)
- Himne en honor de Ramon Llull (1916)
- Marcha ascensión de María for chorus and organ (or orchestra)
- Te Deum for chorus and organ
- Los héroes, prelude
- Bellver, prelude
- Capricho español
- Gran montería
- Bendita sea tu pureza for 2 voices with piano
- Los pájaros del Paraíso, gran vals fantástico, for violin
- Scherzo in A minor
