= Conquista (disambiguation) =

Conquista (Conquest) may refer to:

- La Conquista, Spanish colonization of the Americas

== Music and dance ==
- La Conquista (opera), 2005 opera by Lorenzo Ferrero
- Baile de la Conquista, a dance which reenacts the Spanish conquest of Guatemala

== Places ==
- Conquista, Andalusia, town in Spain
- Conquista, Minas Gerais, city in Brazil
- Conquista, Spain, a municipality in the province of Córdoba, Spain
- Conquista de la Sierra, municipality located in the province of Cáceres, Extremadura, Spain
- La Conquista, Nicaragua, municipality in the Nicaraguan department of Carazo
- Vitória da Conquista, city in the Brazilian state of Bahia

== Other uses ==
- Conquista rose, a modern hybrid tea rose

== See also ==
- Reconquista (disambiguation)
