= Afonso Gonçalves =

Portuguese political activist

- Afonso Gonçalves
- Born: Afonso de Jesus Ferreira Gonçalves; 21 May 2000 (age 26); Leiria
- Other name: Grande Líder (Great Leader)
- Citizenship: Portuguese
- Occupations: Political activist and writer
- Known for: Founder and president of the Reconquista movement
- Website: www.afonsogoncalves.pt

Afonso de Jesus Ferreira Gonçalves (born 21 May 2000) is a Portuguese nationalist political activist and writer, and the founder and president of Reconquista, a movement that describes itself as dedicated to the "defence of sovereignty, identity and ethno-cultural continuity" of Portugal. He is known for street demonstrations against immigration, his advocacy of "remigration", and his involvement in the Remigration Summit: he spoke at its first edition in 2025 and co-organised the second edition, held in Portugal in 2026.

== Biography ==
Gonçalves was born on 21 May 2000 in Leiria and studied until the seventh grade at a Catholic school in Fátima, in the municipality of Ourém. He describes himself as a nationalist and Catholic, referring to his Catholic upbringing and a "strong bond with his homeland". According to Diário de Notícias, he did not come from a family with a political tradition; he himself dates the beginning of his activism to 2023.

In April 2026, he self-published the book Remigração: Como Salvar Portugal.

He is a political science student at the Portuguese Catholic University.

== Reconquista ==
Gonçalves in front of the São Bento Palace, the seat of the Assembly of the Republic.

Gonçalves founded Reconquista in 2023; the movement's website gives 21 October 2023 as its founding date. The movement became known for actions such as disrupting a Pride event in Évora in June 2023 and a book launch in Lisbon in September 2023, which the then president of the Assembly of the Republic, Augusto Santos Silva, described as "unacceptable". In October 2023, the social media platform X suspended Portuguese far-right accounts, including accounts associated with the group. Gonçalves was subsequently banned from YouTube and suspended from TikTok, Instagram, and crowdfunding platforms such as Patreon.

Gonçalves leading a Reconquista march.

Between January and March 2024, ahead of the 2024 legislative election, the movement published a video series entitled "A Grande Invasão" (The Great Invasion), which Diário de Notícias described as anti-immigration propaganda based on the "Great Replacement" theory. On 25 April 2024, members of the movement demonstrated at Praça do Comércio during celebrations marking the 50th anniversary of the Carnation Revolution.

Gonçalves rejects the far-right label, which parts of the Portuguese press use to describe the movement.

A poll conducted by Intercampus on behalf of the movement between 10 and 31 July 2026, based on 803 interviews and released in September, gave Reconquista 5.2% of voting intentions in a legislative election; according to the movement, 31.3% of respondents said they would consider voting for it.

== Arrests and judicial investigation ==
On 28 March 2025, Gonçalves was detained by the PSP after climbing onto a balcony on Rua do Benformoso, in the Martim Moniz neighbourhood of Lisbon, where he displayed a banner and delivered a speech against immigration. He was released after being identified.

In March 2026, it was reported that the Public Prosecutor's Office, through the Porto Department of Investigation and Criminal Action (DIAP), had requested the freezing of bank accounts held in Gonçalves's name as part of an investigation into suspected hate crimes. According to press reports, the authorities suspected that the accounts were being used to finance the movement. Gonçalves contested the measure and claimed that he was being persecuted. He also stated that the banks Revolut, Millennium BCP, BPI, and Novo Banco had closed or suspended his accounts, citing hate speech. As of November 2026, there have been no reports of charges or convictions.

In November 2025, Gonçalves announced that his application for an Electronic System for Travel Authorization (ESTA) to the United States, under the Visa Waiver Program, had been denied, which he attributed to his political views.

== International activities ==
Gonçalves spoke at the first Remigration Summit, held in Gallarate, near Milan, in May 2025.

On 30 May 2026, he organised the second edition in Portugal alongside Austrian activist Martin Sellner. The event took place in Figueira da Foz and was attended by between 500 and 600 people, including members of Alternative for Germany and Vox, with Greg Bovino, a former head of the United States Border Patrol, as a guest. The PSP's Intervention Corps provided security at the event.

== Works ==
- Remigração: Como Salvar Portugal. Lisbon: self-published, 2026. ISBN 978-989-33-9916-3.
