= Reconquista (disambiguation) =

The Reconquista was the gradual military retaking ("reconquering") of the Iberian Peninsula from the Moors.

Reconquest or Reconquista may also refer to:

- Return of the Spanish to Santa Fe de Nuevo México with replacement of the Pueblo republic with a new colonial government a dozen years after the Pueblo Revolt of 1680
- Reconquista de Buenos Aires, the restoration of Spanish control of Buenos Aires in 1806; see British invasions of the River Plate § First invasion
- Reconquista (Spanish America), the restoration of Spanish colonial possessions in the New World, typically control of colonial governments loyal to Ferdinand VII of Spain following the Peninsular War in Europe
  - Reconquest (Chile), the restoration of Spanish colonial possession of Chile during the War of Independence
  - Reconquista (Colombia), the restoration of Spanish colonial possession following a rebellion in what is now Colombia; see Spanish reconquest of New Granada
  - Santo Domingo / Dominican Republic:
    - Reconquista (Santo Domingo), the restoration of Spanish colonial possession of Santo Domingo following a period of French occupation
    - Spanish occupation of the Dominican Republic, the retaking of the former colony by Spain 17 years after it gained independence
  - Spanish attempts to reconquer Mexico
- Reconquista, the restoration of Portuguese colonial possession (or joint Portuguese and Spanish rule) following periods of Dutch occupation
  - Reconquest of Angola
  - Recapture of Bahia
  - Recapture of Recife
- Reconquista (Mexico), an irredentist movement advocating restoration of Mexican sovereignty over territories taken by the United States
- Operación Reconquista de España, the 1944 invasion of the Aran Valley by the Spanish Maquis

== Places ==
- Reconquista, Santa Fe, a city in Argentina
  - Reconquista Airport
  - Roman Catholic Diocese of Reconquista
- Reconquista River, a river in the province of Buenos Aires, Argentina

== Other uses ==
- "Reconquista", a 2011 song by Hangry & Angry
- La Reconquista de Buenos Aires, a 1909 Argentine painting commemorating a historical event
- Reconquista, a 2023 Portuguese ultranationalist group

== See also ==
- Conquista (disambiguation)
- Reconquête, a 2022 far-right French political party
