= Ballet of the Slovak National Theatre =

The Ballet of the Slovak National Theatre (Slovak: Balet Slovenského národného divadla, abbr. Balet SND) is the ballet company of the Slovak National Theatre.

The company history started in May 1920 with the productions of Coppélia and Slavonic Dances. Today, it offers a repertoire of classical, neoclassical and modern pieces.

The company director is Jozef Dolinský (the younger), appointed in 2012. The company has 8 first soloists, 12 soloists, 13 demi soloists and 43 corps de ballet dancers. The first soloists are: Erina Akatsuka, Olga Chelpanova, Yuri Kaminaka, Romina Cholodziej, Konstantin Korotkov, Artemyj Pyzhov, Tatum Shoptaugh a Andrej Szabo.
