= Jozef Kundlák =

Slovak tenor (born 1956)

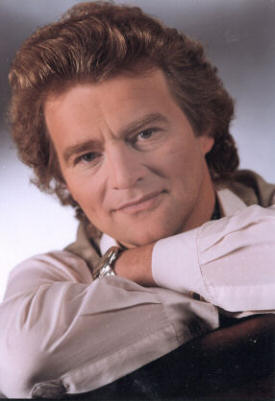
Jozef Kundlák

Jozef Kundlák (born October 12, 1956) is a Slovak tenor.

== Biography ==
Born in Bratislava, he studied at the local Conservatory with Professor Ida Černecka. After graduation he took part in the Summer Opera Course of the European Opera Center in Belgium in 1984. In 1983 he became soloist of the Slovak National Theatre and participated in projects in Germany, Spain, Switzerland and Russia. He won several awards including the Antonín Dvořák Contest (1978), Mikuláš Schneider-Trnavský Contest (1981), and the Luciano Pavarotti's Singer's Contest in Philadelphia in 1985.

Kundlák performed at the Bolshoi Theatre, Teatro alla Scala, Teatro San Carlo, Teatro Comunale di Bologna, Teatro La Fenice, Teatro Carlo Felice, Bavarian State Opera, Frankfurt Opera House, Deutsche Oper Berlin, Vienna State Opera and other opera houses around Europe and North America. He cooperated with many renowned conductors such as Bruno Bartoletti, Riccardo Muti, Wolfgang Sawallisch, Peter Schreier, Fabio Luisi, Christian Thielemann and others.

== Work ==
In 1991, the bicentenary of Mozart's death, Kundlák sang the Requiem with the Philadelphia Orchestra under Riccardo Muti at the Carnegie Hall and at the Academy of Music (Philadelphia). He also sang diverse Masses and Oratories at the Vienna Concert Hall, in Stuttgart, Milan and Salzburg. He voiced the role of Belmonte in Mozart's opera Die Entführung aus dem Serail at the Deutsche Oper Berlin and at the Bavarian State Opera in Munich. Subsequently, he added new roles to his repertoire, such as Alfredo in La traviata, Fenton in Falstaff, Faust in Gounod's Faust and Boito's Mefistofele, Lensky in Eugene Onegin and Werther in Jules Massenet's eponymous opera. His guest performances at the Light Opera Festival in Triest in the role of Camille de Rosillon in Lehár's Die Lustige Witwe and in a well-cast production of Lindsay Kemp's Zauberflöte by W. A. Mozart at the festival in Peralada were very successful.

Kundlák is a regular guest at the Prague National Theatre. In 2005 he sang the role of Montezuma in the world premiere of the opera La Conquista by Lorenzo Ferrero. He sings also at the Prague State Opera house, mainly Verdi's La traviata and Rigoletto. For the Janáček Theatre in Brno he performs La traviata and Mefistofele by Arrigo Boito. In the 2005–06 season he performed Rusalka and Eugene Onegin.

As a soloist of the Slovak National Theatre he performs at home in diverse roles of the operatic repertoire: Prince in Dvořak's Rusalka, Don Ottavio in Don Giovanni, Nemorino in Donizetti's L'elisir d'amore. He has performed Alfredo in La traviata, on the Slovak National Theatre's Japan tour in 2004. He also performed in Beethoven's Missa Solemnis in Graz and in Shostakovich's De la poésie Juive in Paris. For Salzburg he studied Bach's St John Passion and the Symphony No. 9 by Ludwig van Beethoven. In Leipzig he performed Messiah by Händel with the conductor Fabio Luisi. With the same conductor he appeared in the Anniversary Strauss Concert with the Munich Philharmonic. In other seasons he took part in concerts on many European stages with Dvořák's choral works and Verdi's Requiem. Kundlák performs a large Mozart and Haydn repertoire and concert works by Dvořák, Janáček, and Stravinsky. His repertoire spans the gamut from the classical period to contemporary classical music.
