= Slovak National Theatre =

Theatre and opera company in Bratislava, Slovakia

- Slovenské národné divadlo
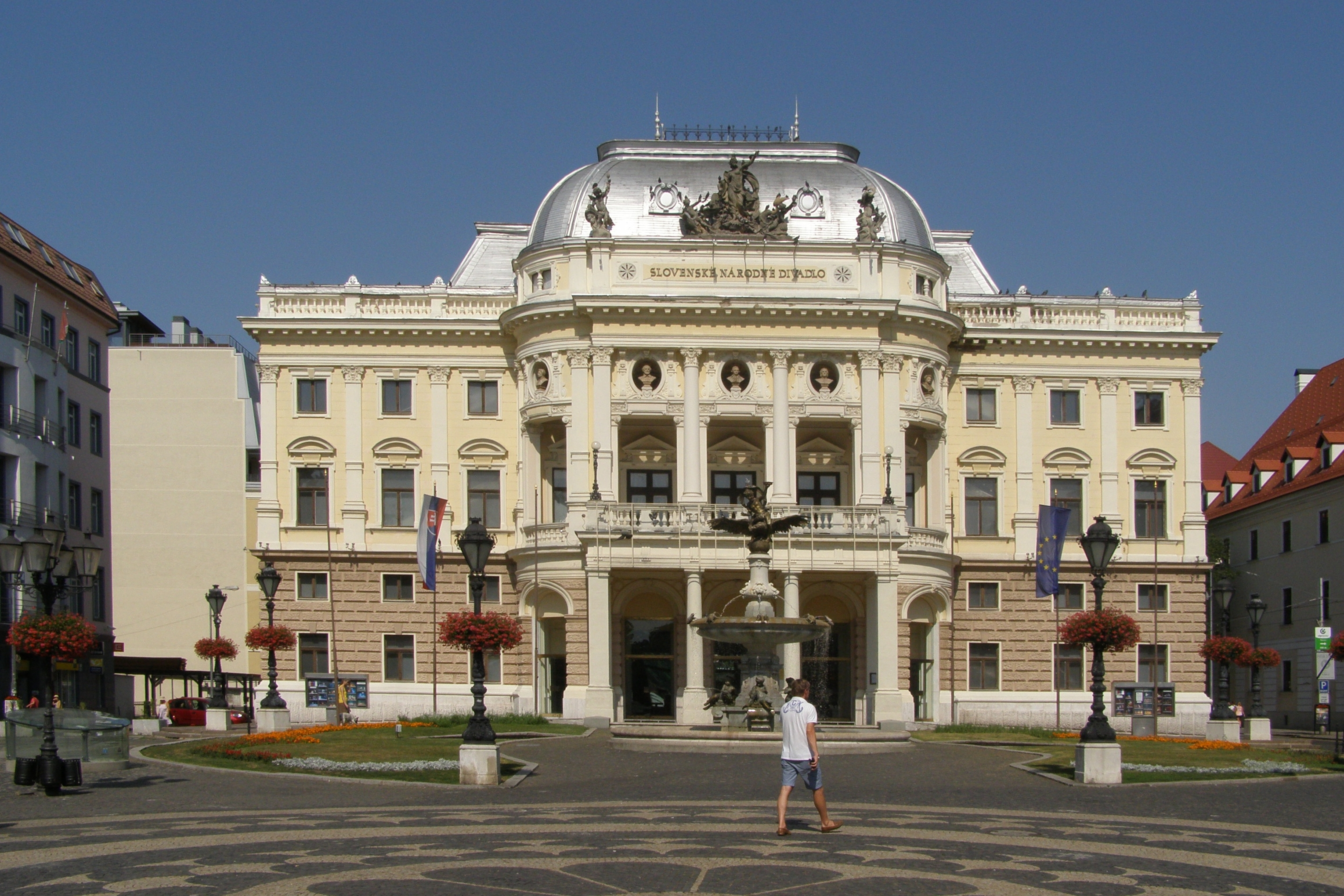
- Old Slovak National Theatre building

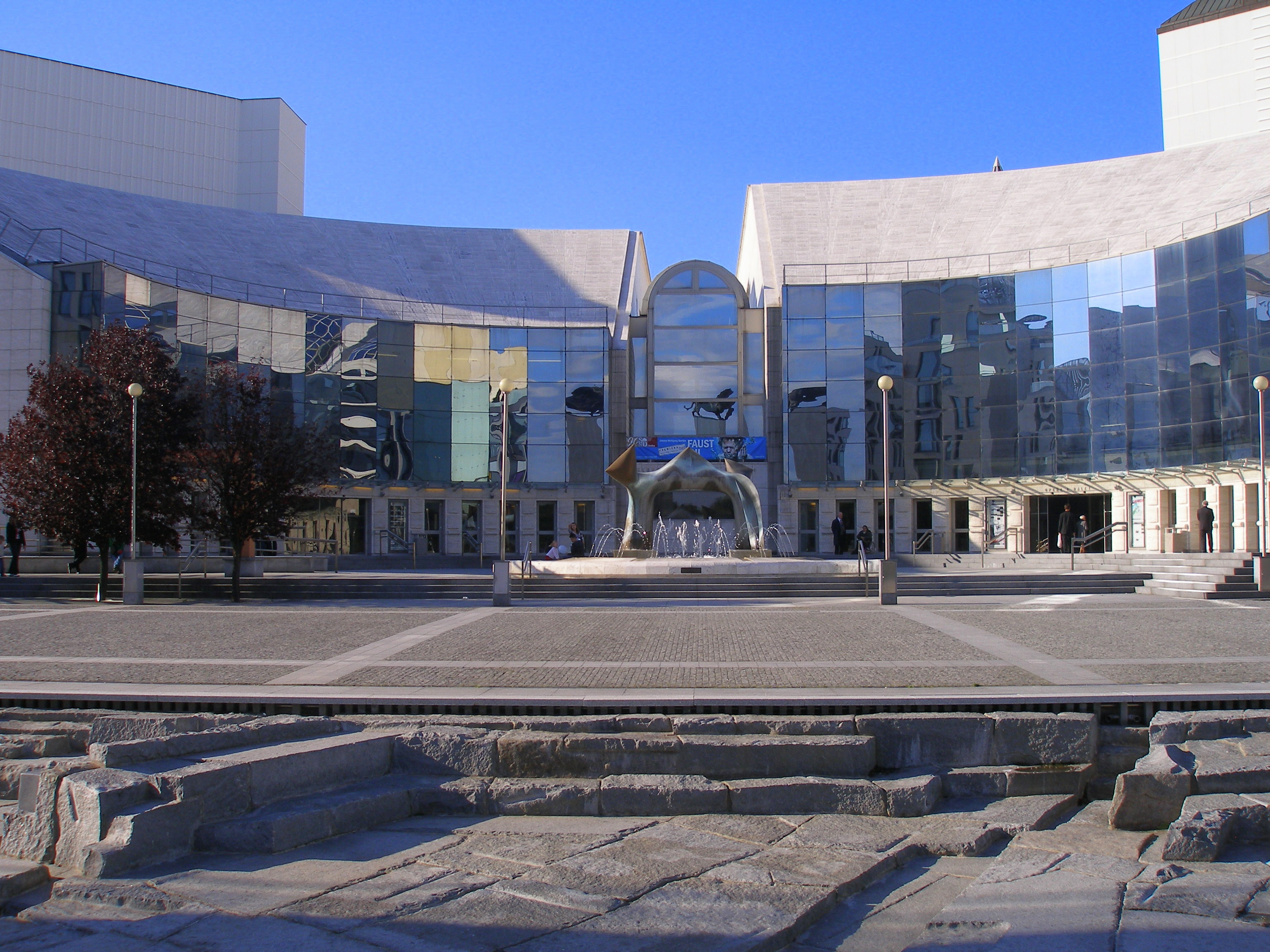
- New Slovak National Theatre building
- Interactive map of Slovak National Theatre
- Address: Pribinova 17, Staré Mesto; Bratislava; Slovakia
- Coordinates: 48°08′33″N 17°06′38″E
- Capacity: 1,700
- Type: Theatre

Construction
- Opened: 1 March 1920
- Expanded: 14 April 2007
- Years active: 1920–present

Website
- snd.sk

The Slovak National Theater (Slovak: Slovenské národné divadlo, abbr. SND) is the oldest professional theatre in Slovakia, consisting of three ensembles: opera, ballet, and drama. Its history begins shortly after the establishment of the first Czechoslovak Republic in 1918. It is located in the capital, Bratislava.

The theatre is currently based in two separate buildings: the historic Neo-Renaissance building at Gorkého 2 (Hviezdoslavovo námestie) and the new SND building in the Old Town, opened on 14 April 2007, at Pribinova 17. Performances take place on most days of the year. The Slovak National Theatre has represented Slovak culture on its numerous tours abroad.

== History ==
After the establishment of the Czechoslovak Republic, the idea of a professional Slovak theatre slowly began to materialize. In 1919, the SND Cooperative commissioned the establishment of the Slovak National Theatre (SNT). The cooperative concluded a contract with the director of the East Bohemian Company, Bedřich Jeřábek. It was his opera and drama ensemble that in 1920 began operating all three SND ensembles (drama, opera, ballet) in the building of the former municipal theatre.

The opera of the SNT began its activities on 1 March 1920 with the production of The Kiss by Czech composer Bedřich Smetana. A day later, the drama ensemble presented the play Mariša by brothers Alois and Vilém Mrštík. The ballet section of the theatre made its debut with a production of Coppélia by Léo Delibes on 19 May 1920. The first performance in Slovak also took place in May of that year, with renditions of the one-act plays Hriech and V službe by Jozef Gregor-Tajovský.

The majority of the theatre's original repertoire was performed in Czech because there were not enough Slovak plays, translations, actors, or singers. The first Slovak professional actors, Andrej Bagar, Janko Borodáč, Oľga Borodáčová, Jozef Kello, and Gašpar Arbét, formed the core of the SND promotional drama ensemble.

The SND ensembles originally played in three different buildings—the drama ensemble played in the Pavel Országh Hviezdoslav Theatre building on Laurinská Street and on the Small Stage of the Slovak National Theatre on Dostojevského rad. The opera and ballet were housed in a historic building on Hviezdoslav Square. On 14 April 2007, the SND moved to a new building on Pribinova Street no. 17, in which all three ensembles play under one roof. The space holds 1,700 seats. In addition to the new SND building, the theatre company also continues to use the historic building, where opera, ballet, and drama performances are still held.

== Old building ==
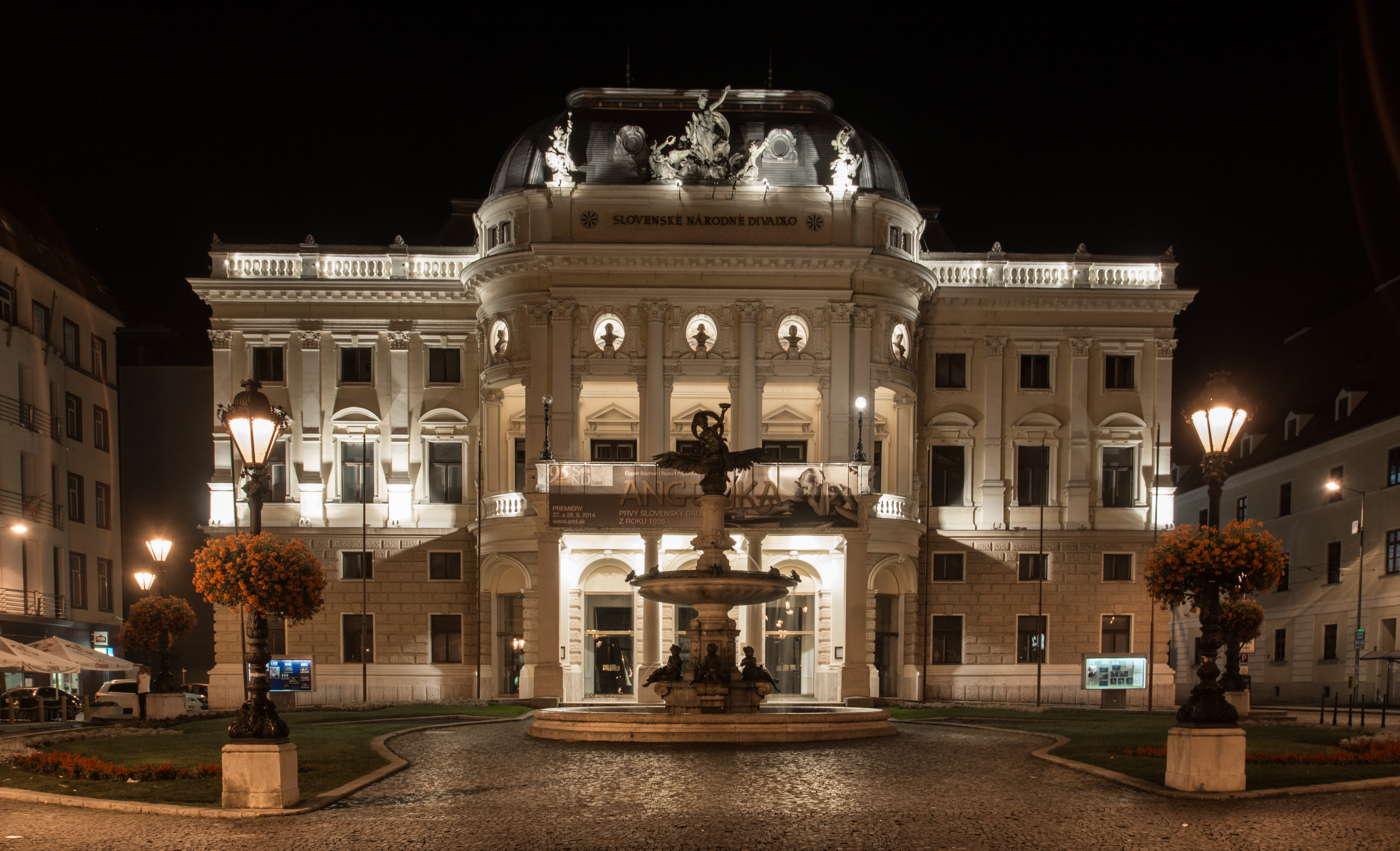
The old Slovak National Theatre building at night

Located on Hviezdoslav Square, the Neo-Renaissance structure was built in 1885–1886 during the time of Austria-Hungary, based on a design by the Viennese architects Fellner & Helmer, who designed theatre buildings in various European cities. It was opened as the "City Theatre" on 22 September 1886, with the opera Bánk bán by Ferenc Erkel, which is one of the most important Hungarian operas. As a sign of this event's importance, Kálmán Tisza, then-Hungarian prime minister, and his entire cabinet, as well as noted Hungarian writer Mór Jókai, attended the ceremony. The gala performance was conducted by Ferenc Erkel himself. The original building was designed for 1,000 spectators and was illuminated using 800 gas lamps, while the auditorium had a chandelier with 64 lights. The interior was decorated with frescoes by Bratislava-native painter Kornél Spányik and paintings by Munich artist Willibald Leo von Lütgendorff-Leinburg, among others.

Austrian sculptor Viktor Oskar Tilgner built the Ganymede fountain located in front of the theatre in 1888.

The building was restored between 1969 and 1972, when a new modern technical building was added behind the old structure. It features a unique chandelier with 2,532 light bulbs, enabling the creation of millions of combinations of light designs based on pre-selected programs.

Murals in the old theatre building

Murals by Willibald Leo von Lütgendorff-Leinburg

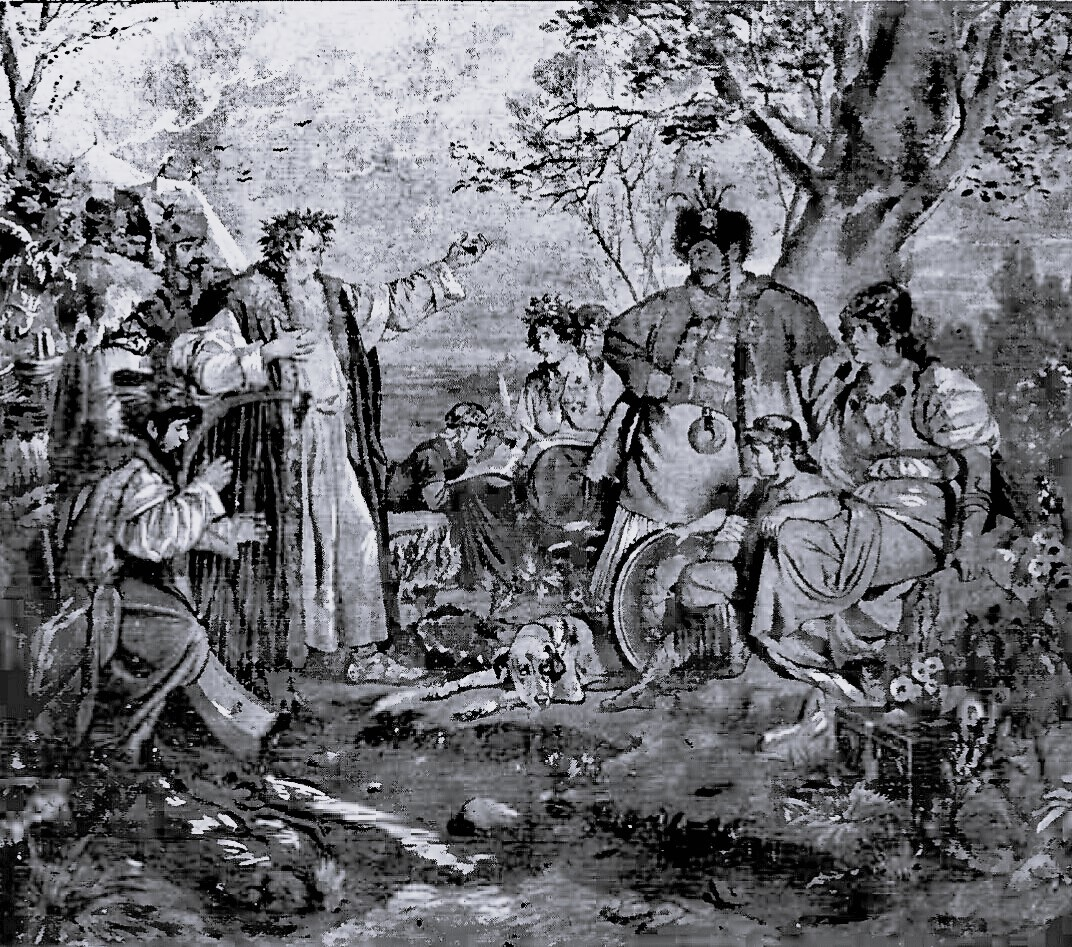
old Hungarian bard

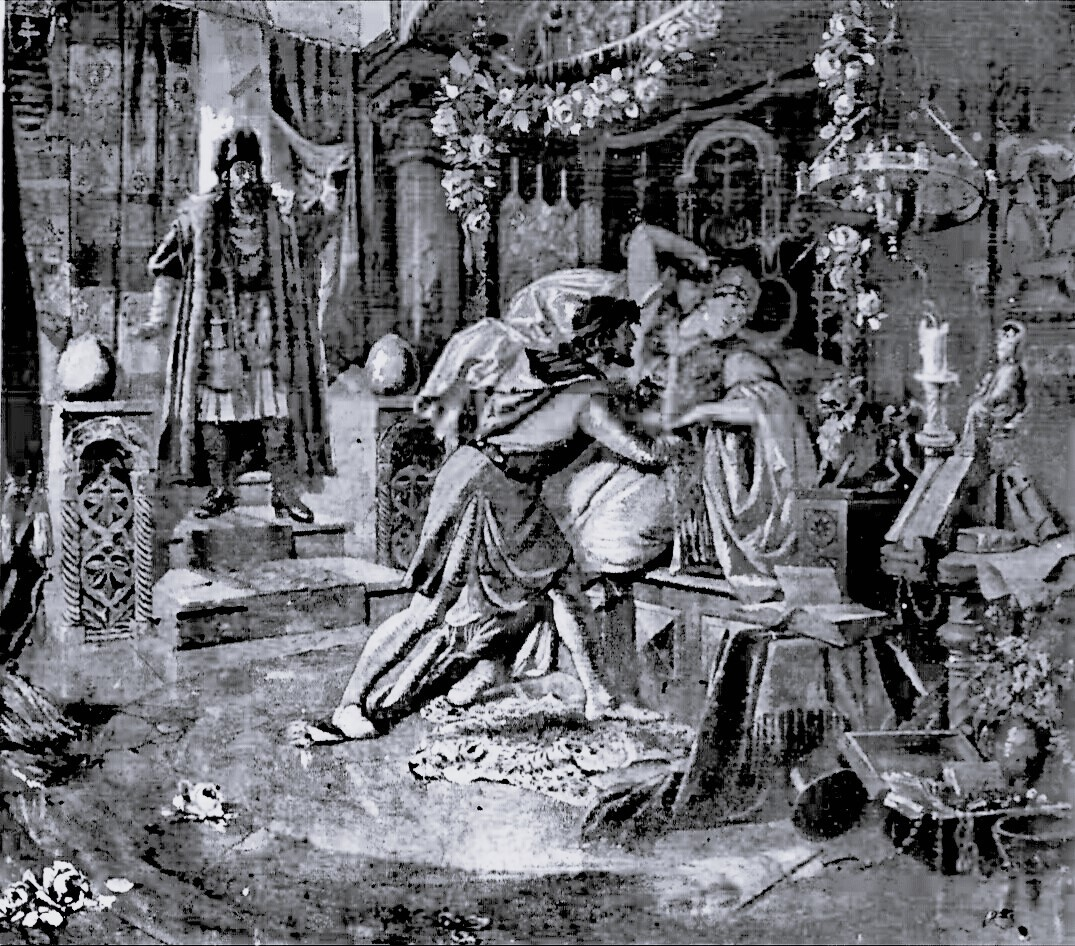
from the tragedy Bánk bán

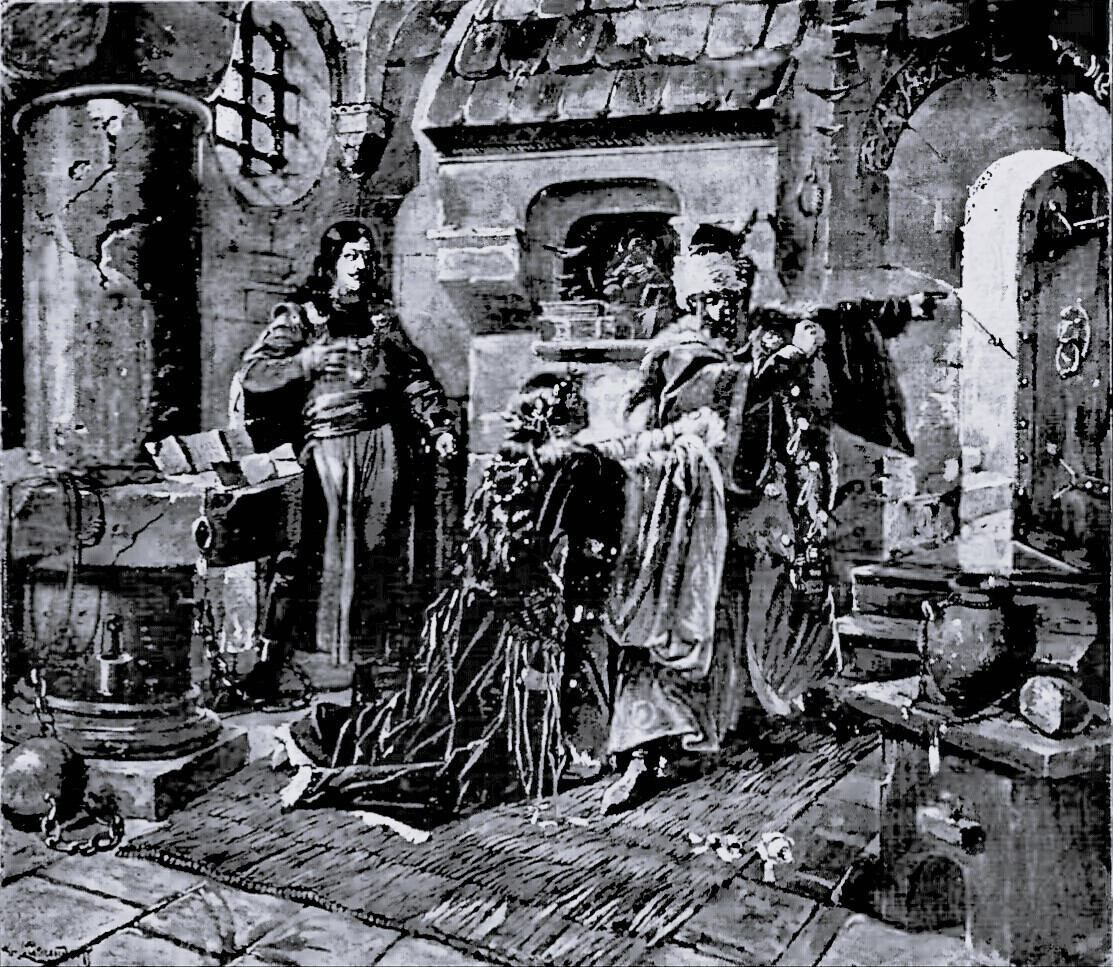
from the opera Hunyadi László

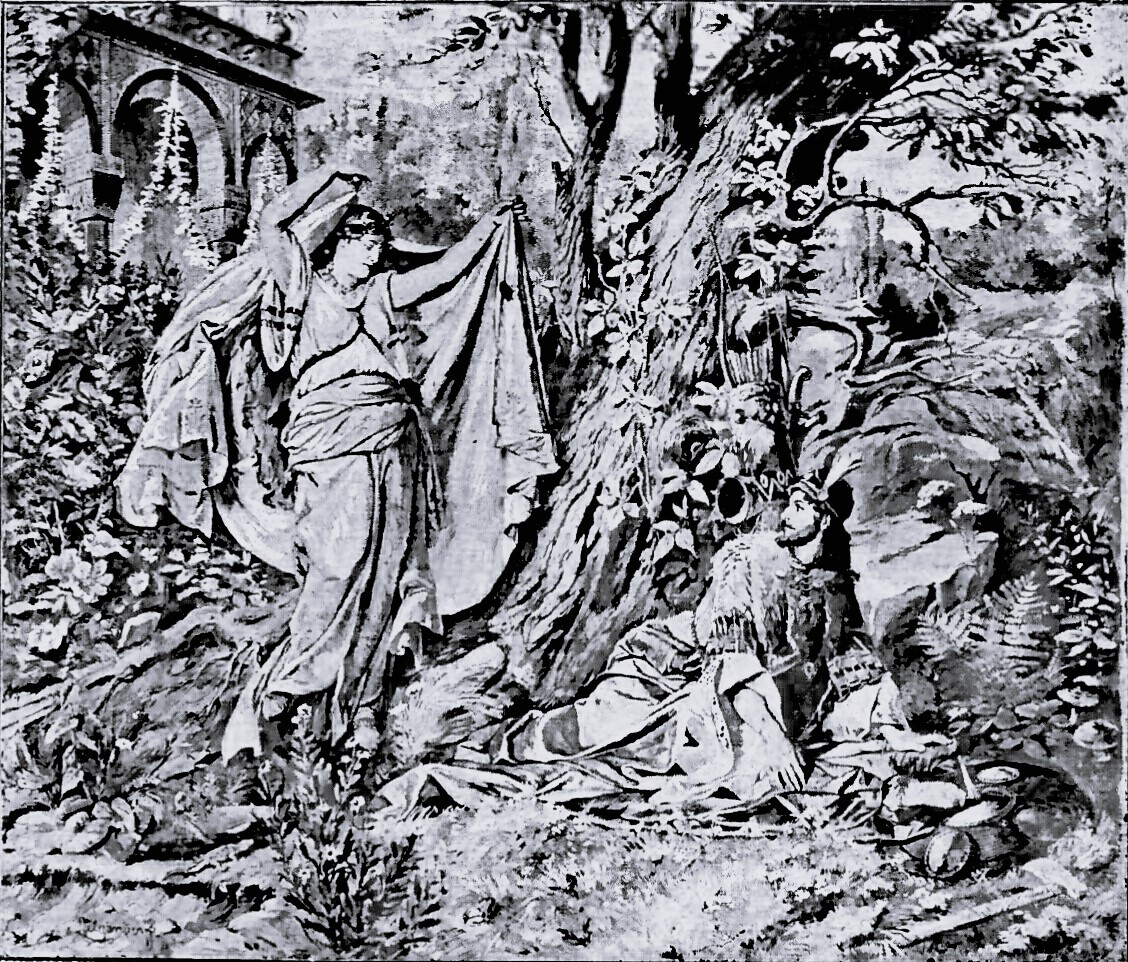
Fairy tale

== New building ==
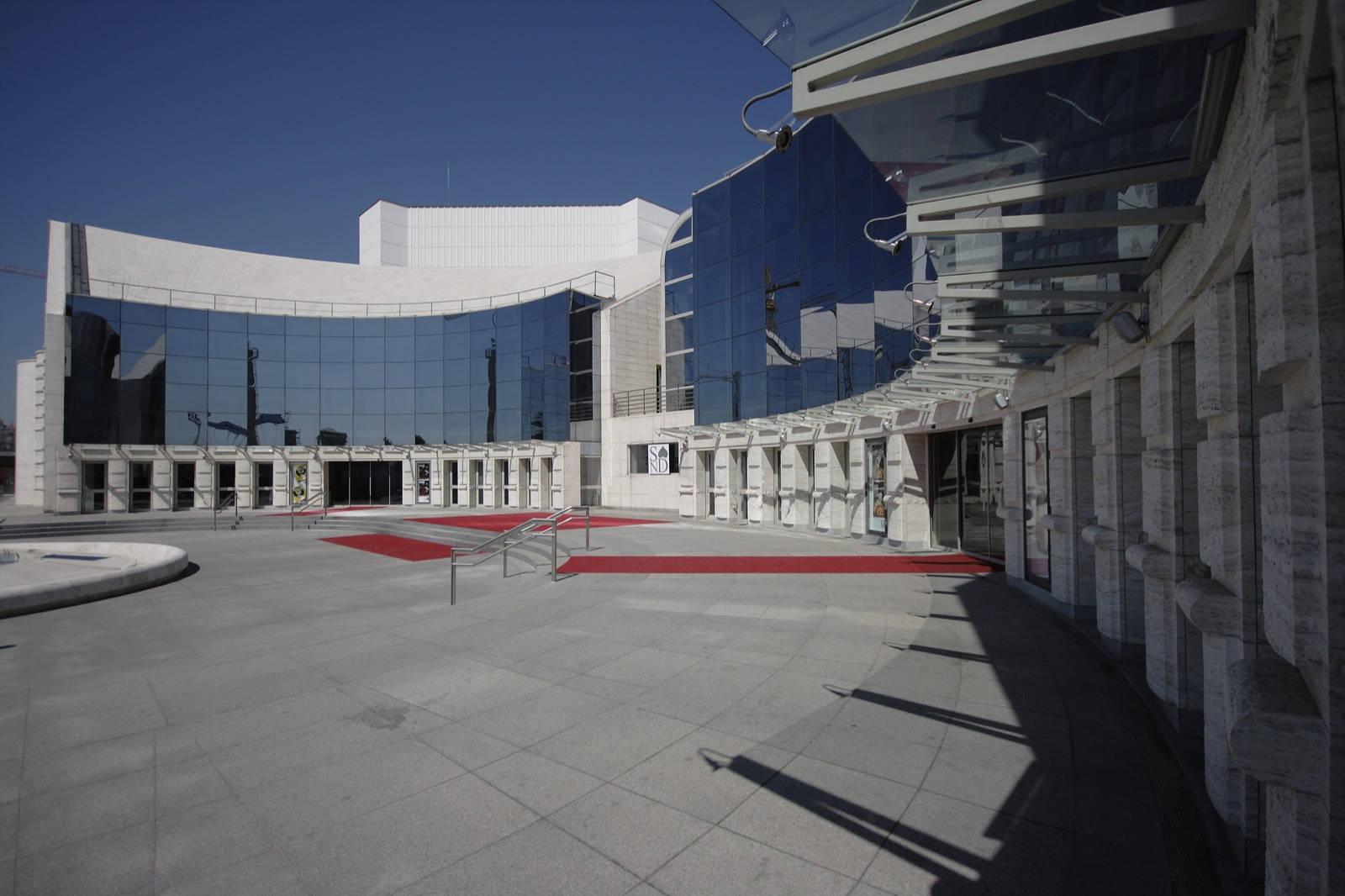
Front of the new Slovak National Theatre building

The design of the new building was created in the early 1980s, and construction started in 1986. Due to a lack of funds, the building was under construction for 21 years, which increased the planned costs from 874 million to almost 5 billion Slovak crowns. The building was finally opened on 14 April 2007 and it houses all three ensembles of the Slovak National Theatre. It is designed to hold 1,700 spectators in total.

== Notable personalities ==
- Oskar Nedbal (director, 1923–1930)
- Eugen Suchoň
- Ján Cikker
- Alexander Moyzes

Singers

- Edita Gruberová
- Lucia Popp
- Peter Dvorský
- Jozef Kundlák
- Adriana Kučerová
