= Opinion polling for the next Portuguese legislative election =

In the run up to the next Portuguese legislative election, various organisations will carry out opinion polling to gauge voting intention in Portugal. Results of such polls are displayed in this article. The date range for these opinion polls are from the 2025 Portuguese legislative election, held on 18 May, to the present day.

== Nationwide polling ==
=== Polling ===
Poll results are listed in the table below in reverse chronological order, showing the most recent first. The highest percentage figure in each polling survey is displayed in bold, and the background shaded in the leading party's colour. In the instance that there is a tie, parties are shaded with their colour. The lead column on the right shows the percentage-point difference between the two parties with the highest figures. Poll results use the date the survey's fieldwork was done, as opposed to the date of publication.

Polls that show their results without distributing those respondents who are undecided or said they would abstain from voting, are re-calculated by removing these numbers from the totals through a simple rule of three, in order to obtain results comparable to other polls and the official election results.

Polling firm/Link	Fieldwork date	Sample size	Turnout	AD	PS	CH	IL	L	CDU	BE	PAN		O	Lead
Intercampus (Note: Results presented here exclude undecideds (6.6%). With their inclusion results are: PS: 26.3%; CH: 22.2%; AD: 21.4%; IL: 8.3%; Livre: 3.8%; CDU: 3.4%; PAN: 2.4%; BE: 1.9%; Others/Invalid: 3.6%.)	11–18 Nov 2026	609	?	22.9	**28.2**	23.8	8.9	4.1	3.6	2.0	2.6	—N/a	3.9	4.4
Pitagórica (Note: Weekly tracking poll.)	19 Oct–13 Nov 2026	804	?	23.0	**29.4**	27.3	4.8	3.7	2.1	2.0	1.0	—N/a	6.7	2.1
Aximage	9–10 Nov 2026	501	?	20.4	**30.0**	27.6	6.9	4.2	2.0	2.3	1.6	—N/a	5.0	2.4
Pitagórica	12 Oct–6 Nov 2026	804	?	22.7	**29.6**	27.3	5.1	3.4	2.3	2.1	1.3	—N/a	6.2	2.3
Aximage	26 Oct–2 Nov 2026	1,063	80.1	20.8	**28.8**	27.1	7.3	3.9	2.6	3.1	2.8	—N/a	3.6	1.7
Pitagórica	5–30 Oct 2026	804	?	22.3	**29.6**	27.3	5.6	3.6	2.4	2.2	1.2	—N/a	5.8	2.3
ICS/ISCTE	16–25 Oct 2026	808	?	26	**30**	26	4	4	3	2	0	0	5	4
Pitagórica	28 Sep–23 Oct 2026	804	?	21.6	**29.4**	27.9	6.1	3.7	2.8	1.8	1.1	—N/a	5.6	1.5
Pitagórica	21 Sep–16 Oct 2026	804	?	22.8	**28.6**	27.9	7.0	2.8	3.2	1.8	1.3	—N/a	4.6	0.7
Intercampus (Note: Results presented here exclude undecideds (7.9%). With their inclusion results are: PS: 22.5%; CH: 22.1%; AD: 20.0%; IL: 7.4%; Livre: 5.1%; CDU: 4.3%; PAN: 3.8%; BE: 2.6%; Others/Invalid: 4.3%.)	6–12 Oct 2026	615	?	21.7	**24.4**	24.0	8.0	5.5	4.7	2.8	4.1	—N/a	4.7	0.4
Pitagórica	14 Sep–10 Oct 2026	804	?	22.9	**28.3**	27.9	6.8	3.1	2.6	1.7	1.0	—N/a	5.7	0.4
Aximage	6–7 Oct 2026	501	72.7	21.7	28.9	**30.7**	5.6	3.3	1.8	1.7	2.0	—N/a	4.4	1.8
Pitagórica	7 Sep–3 Oct 2026	804	?	23.9	**27.5**	27.3	6.7	2.7	2.8	1.7	1.0	—N/a	6.4	0.2
Pitagórica	31 Aug–26 Sep 2026	804	?	24.8	**27.7**	27.4	6.3	3.3	2.4	1.6	1.1	—N/a	5.4	0.3
Pitagórica	24 Aug–18 Sep 2026	804	?	25.1	**27.9**	27.3	6.5	3.9	2.0	1.6	0.7	—N/a	5.0	0.6
Aximage	14–15 Sep 2026	500	66.8	21.9	**29.1**	28.6	6.3	3.1	1.7	0.9	2.5	—N/a	5.9	0.5
Intercampus (Note: Results presented here exclude undecideds (10.3%). With their inclusion results are: PS: 24.6%; CH: 21.4%; AD: 21.0%; IL: 8.9%; Livre: 3.6%; BE: 2.5%; CDU: 2.2%; PAN: 2.0%; Others/Invalid: 3.6%.)	7–14 Sep 2026	609	?	23.4	**27.5**	23.9	9.9	4.0	2.2	2.8	2.0	—N/a	4.0	3.6
Pitagórica	18 Aug–12 Sep 2026	804	?	24.3	**28.6**	27.6	6.7	4.2	2.3	1.4	1.3	—N/a	3.6	1.0
Aximage	1–7 Sep 2026	1,109	75.7	20.9	**29.7**	25.4	7.9	3.4	3.0	1.6	2.4	—N/a	5.7	4.3
Pitagórica	10 Aug–4 Sep 2026	804	?	25.7	**27.9**	27.1	6.1	4.0	2.4	2.2	1.3	—N/a	3.3	0.8
Intercampus (Note: Results presented here exclude undecideds (5.9%) and those who would not vote (3.7%). With their inclusion results are: PS: 24.3%; CH: 22.0%; AD: 20.0%; IL: 7.3%; Livre: 6.2%; PAN: 2.9%; CDU: 2.7%; BE: 2.7%; Others/Invalid: 2.1%.)	10–31 Jul 2026	803	?	22.2	**26.9**	24.4	8.1	6.9	3.0	3.0	3.2	—N/a	2.3	2.5
Aximage	22–27 Jul 2026	802	73.6	25.0	**28.7**	26.2	7.4	3.3	2.3	1.8	1.0	—N/a	4.2	2.5
Aximage	20–21 Jul 2026	501	75.0	23.2	**29.2**	26.4	7.4	4.6	1.8	1.3	2.1	—N/a	4.0	2.8
Intercampus (Note: Results presented here exclude undecideds (12.3%). With their inclusion results are: PS: 23.3%; AD: 20.0%; CH: 19.4%; IL: 7.6%; Livre: 6.8%; CDU: 4.1%; PAN: 2.5%; BE: 1.8%; Others/Invalid: 2.2%.)	9–14 Jul 2026	604	?	22.8	**26.6**	22.1	8.7	7.8	4.7	2.1	2.9	—N/a	2.4	3.8
CESOP–UCP	6–10 Jul 2026	996	?	**29**	**29**	21	8	6	3	2	0	0	2	Tie
Aximage	24–25 Jun 2026	500	73.8	25.3	**29.3**	23.6	6.5	5.8	1.6	1.5	2.2	—N/a	4.1	4.0
Intercampus (Note: Results presented here exclude undecideds (12.9%). With their inclusion results are: PS: 24.3%; CH: 20.3%; AD: 19.5%; IL: 6.8%; Livre: 5.7%; CDU: 3.0%; BE: 2.5%; PAN: 2.3%; Others/Invalid: 2.7%.)	10–16 Jun 2026	609	?	22.4	**27.9**	23.3	7.8	6.5	3.4	2.9	2.6	—N/a	3.1	4.6
Aximage	9–13 Jun 2026	817	73.4	27.2	**29.5**	25.0	7.1	3.0	1.5	2.1	1.6	—N/a	3.1	2.3
ICS/ISCTE	15–24 May 2026	803	?	27	**31**	20	3	3	5	2	2	0	7	4
Aximage	18–19 May 2026	505	72.3	23.2	**33.4**	23.5	6.3	4.7	2.4	1.3	1.3	—N/a	3.9	9.9
Intercampus (Note: Results presented here exclude undecideds (10.7%). With their inclusion results are: PS: 23.6%; AD: 22.9%; CH: 19.3%; IL: 7.0%; Livre: 5.2%; CDU: 3.6%; BE: 3.6%; PAN: 2.1%; Others/Invalid: 2.0%.)	8–14 May 2026	606	?	25.6	**26.4**	21.6	7.8	5.8	4.0	4.0	2.4	—N/a	2.2	0.8
Aximage	6–7 May 2026	803	72.0	25.1	**31.0**	25.0	5.6	3.6	2.1	1.4	2.3	—N/a	3.9	5.9
Aximage	10–15 Apr 2026	500	71.7	24.3	**30.6**	23.6	7.0	5.8	2.5	0.8	1.8	—N/a	3.7	6.3
Intercampus (Note: Results presented here exclude undecideds (13.0%). With their inclusion results are: PS: 23.4%; AD: 20.6%; CH: 19.0%; IL: 7.2%; Livre: 5.3%; CDU: 3.9%; BE: 2.6%; PAN: 2.6%; Others/Invalid: 2.3%.)	8–14 Apr 2026	608	?	23.7	**26.9**	21.9	8.3	6.1	4.5	3.0	3.0	—N/a	2.6	3.2
ICS/ISCTE	27 Feb–8 Mar 2026	801	?	**29**	**29**	25	5	2	4	2	1	0	3	Tie
Aximage	2–3 Mar 2026	551	73.9	26.6	**27.0**	25.8	7.4	4.2	2.7	0.9	1.3	—N/a	4.1	0.4
Intercampus (Note: Results presented here exclude undecideds (9.0%). With their inclusion results are: AD: 24.0%; CH: 22.9%; PS: 21.3%; IL: 8.6%; Livre: 6.9%; CDU: 2.0%; BE: 1.6%; PAN: 1.2%; Others/Invalid: 2.6%.)	6–13 Jan 2026	806	?	**26.3**	23.4	25.1	9.4	7.6	2.2	1.8	1.3	—N/a	2.9	1.2
Pitagórica	11–19 Dec 2025	1,000	?	**29.7**	23.1	22.6	7.3	7.3	2.6	1.3	0.5	—N/a	5.6	6.6
Intercampus (Note: Results presented here exclude undecideds (5.8%). With their inclusion results are: AD: 24.1%; PS: 23.9%; CH: 22.1%; IL: 8.6%; Livre: 6.2%; CDU: 3.1%; BE: 2.9%; PAN: 1.3%; Others/Invalid: 2.0%.)	12–16 Dec 2025	611	?	**25.6**	25.4	23.5	9.1	6.6	3.3	3.1	1.4	—N/a	2.1	0.2
CESOP–UCP	4–12 Dec 2025	1,185	?	**29**	23	24	9	6	3	2	<1	0	4	5
Intercampus (Note: Results presented here exclude undecideds (10.2%). With their inclusion results are: AD: 23.4%; PS: 22.6%; CH: 21.2%; IL: 7.2%; Livre: 5.8%; CDU: 3.5%; PAN: 2.2%; BE: 1.7%; Others/Invalid: 2.1%.)	14–19 Nov 2025	611	?	**26.1**	25.2	23.6	8.0	6.5	3.9	1.9	2.5	—N/a	2.3	0.9
ICS/ISCTE	7–17 Nov 2025	807	?	**31**	28	24	4	3	3	2	0	0	5	3
Pitagórica	5–14 Nov 2025	1,000	?	**38.5**	26.4	16.7	5.3	5.7	2.4	0.7	0.9	—N/a	3.4	12.1
Aximage	23–27 Oct 2025	651	73.7	**32.4**	23.8	21.9	5.9	6.1	3.2	1.3	2.0	—N/a	3.4	8.6
Intercampus (Note: Results presented here exclude undecideds (6.0%). With their inclusion results are: AD: 26.3%; PS: 23.9%; CH: 22.9%; IL: 6.6%; Livre: 5.1%; CDU: 3.8%; PAN: 2.8%; BE: 1.3%; Others/Invalid: 1.3%.)	20–26 Oct 2025	609	?	**28.0**	25.4	24.4	7.0	5.4	4.0	1.4	3.0	—N/a	1.4	2.6
**2025 local elections** (Note: AD total is the sum of all PSD and CDS led coalitions; The totals for PS, Livre and BE also include coalitions led by these parties.)	12 Oct 2025	—N/a	59.3	**35.6** (98)	33.2 (90)	11.9 (27)	1.6 (1)	1.1 (1)	5.7 (12)	1.0 (0)	0.2 (0)	0.5 (1)	9.2 (0)	**2.4**
Pitagórica	6–10 Oct 2025	625	?	**34.5**	25.2	21.9	3.8	4.5	3.3	1.6	1.4	—N/a	3.8	9.3
Aximage	2–5 Sep 2025	570	51.4	25.9	23.6	**26.8**	6.2	6.5	3.1	2.4	1.7	—N/a	3.8	0.9
Intercampus (Note: Results presented here exclude undecideds (6.0%). With their inclusion results are: AD: 27.2%; PS: 24.7%; CH: 20.8%; IL: 7.6%; Livre: 5.6%; PAN: 3.0%; BE: 2.6%; CDU: 1.6%; Others/Invalid: 0.9%.)	7–14 Aug 2025	611	?	**28.9**	26.3	22.1	8.1	6.0	1.7	2.8	3.2	—N/a	1.0	2.6
Intercampus (Note: Results presented here exclude undecideds (8.0%). With their inclusion results are: AD: 24.2%; PS: 21.7%; CH: 18.6%; Livre: 9.1%; IL: 6.7%; CDU: 3.7%; PAN: 3.0%; BE: 2.6%; Others/Invalid: 2.4%.)	11–18 Jul 2025	606	?	**26.3**	23.6	20.2	7.3	9.9	4.0	2.8	3.3	—N/a	2.6	2.7
Intercampus (Note: Results presented here exclude undecideds (9.7%). With their inclusion results are: AD: 27.0%; PS: 19.7%; CH: 19.6%; IL: 7.6%; Livre: 6.7%; PAN: 3.5%; CDU: 3.1%; BE: 1.6%; Others/Invalid: 1.6%.)	5–15 Jun 2025	616	?	**29.9**	21.8	21.7	8.4	7.4	3.4	1.8	3.9	—N/a	1.8	8.1
**2025 legislative election**	18 May 2025	—N/a	58.3	**31.8**; 91	22.8; 58	22.8; 60	5.4; 9	4.1; 6	2.9; 3	2.0; 1	1.4; 1	0.3; 1	6.5; 0	**9.0**

==== Other scenarios ====
Hypothetical polling

With "Reconquista"

Polling firm/Link	Fieldwork date	Sample size	Turnout	AD	PS	CH	IL	L	CDU	BE	PAN		R	O	Lead
Intercampus (Note: Results presented here exclude undecideds (7.3%) and those who would not vote (3.4%). With their inclusion results are: PS: 22.7%; AD: 20.0%; CH: 18.6%; IL: 6.7%; Livre: 6.6%; Reconquista: 5.2%; CDU: 2.9%; BE: 2.4%; PAN: 2.4%; Others/Invalid: 1.8%.)	10–31 Jul 2026	803	?	22.4	**25.4**	20.8	7.5	7.4	3.3	2.7	2.7	—N/a	5.8	2.0	3.0
**2025 legislative election**	18 May 2025	—N/a	58.3	**31.8**; 91	22.8; 58	22.8; 60	5.4; 9	4.1; 6	2.9; 3	2.0; 1	1.4; 1	0.3; 1	—N/a	6.5; 0	**9.0**

== Leadership polls ==
=== Preferred prime minister ===
Poll results showing public opinion on who would make the best prime minister or who is better positioned to win are shown in the table below in reverse chronological order, showing the most recent first.

Polling firm/Link	Fieldwork date	Luís Montenegro		André Ventura	N	All 3/ O	NO	Lead
Intercampus	11–18 Nov 2026	26.4	34.5	25.0	—N/a	—N/a	14.1	8.1
Pitagórica	19 Oct–13 Nov 2026	27.1	33.7	17.8	19.4	—N/a	2.0	6.6
Aximage	9–10 Nov 2026	20	23	24	27	3	5	1
Pitagórica	12 Oct–6 Nov 2026	27.2	33.5	20.6	16.5	—N/a	2.2	6.3
Pitagórica	5–30 Oct 2026	27.6	33.3	22.3	14.2	—N/a	2.6	5.7
Pitagórica	28 Sep–23 Oct 2026	29.1	31.2	23.0	13.6	—N/a	3.1	2.1
Pitagórica	21 Sep–16 Oct 2026	32.2	30.3	22.4	11.3	—N/a	3.8	1.9
Intercampus	6–12 Oct 2026	27.5	29.4	28.5	—N/a	—N/a	14.6	0.9
Pitagórica	14 Sep–10 Oct 2026	33.1	31.0	20.3	12.1	—N/a	3.6	2.1
Aximage	6–7 Oct 2026	21	25	28	19	2	6	3
Pitagórica	7 Sep–3 Oct 2026	32.6	31.1	20.6	12.4	—N/a	3.2	1.5
Pitagórica	31 Aug–26 Sep 2026	32.0	32.7	19.7	12.4	—N/a	3.1	0.7
Pitagórica	24 Aug–18 Sep 2026	32.0	32.0	20.8	12.6	—N/a	2.6	Tie
Aximage	14–15 Sep 2026	19.0	27.1	27.4	18.0	2.0	7.0	0.3
Intercampus	7–14 Sep 2026	25.8	25.4	28.4	—N/a	—N/a	20.4	2.6
Pitagórica	18 Aug–12 Sep 2026	31	33	21	12	—N/a	3	2
Pitagórica	10 Aug–4 Sep 2026	32	32	21	12	—N/a	3	Tie
Aximage	22–27 Jul 2026	28	27	26	—N/a	—N/a	19	1
Aximage	20–21 Jul 2026	22	27	24	19	1	6	3
Intercampus	9–14 Jul 2026	26.0	30.8	23.5	—N/a	—N/a	19.7	4.8
Aximage	24–25 Jun 2026	28	27	22	16	2	5	1
Intercampus	10–16 Jun 2026	22.3	33.8	22.2	—N/a	—N/a	21.7	11.5
Aximage	9–13 Jun 2026	33	28	24	—N/a	—N/a	16	5
Aximage	18–19 May 2026	24	27	25	20	1	3	2
Intercampus	8–14 May 2026	27.2	33.3	20.0	—N/a	—N/a	19.5	6.1
Aximage	10–15 Apr 2026	27	23	22	20	2	6	4
Intercampus	8–14 Apr 2026	28.5	29.8	23.0	—N/a	—N/a	18.8	1.3
Aximage	2–3 Mar 2026	31	23	23	17	2	5	8
Aximage	23–27 Oct 2025	33	22	20	19	2	5	11
Aximage	2–5 Sep 2025	28	20	24	20	1	7	4
Intercampus	11–18 Jul 2025	43.2	24.1	—N/a	—N/a	—N/a	32.7	19.1
Intercampus	11–18 Jul 2025	63.9	—N/a	17.7	—N/a	—N/a	18.5	46.2
Intercampus	5–15 Jun 2025	56.3	28.7	—N/a	—N/a	—N/a	14.9	27.6

=== Party leaders' approval/disapproval ratings ===
Poll results showing public opinion on the performance of the leaders of all parties in parliament are shown in the table below in reverse chronological order, showing the most recent first.

Polling firm/Link	Fieldwork date	Luís Montenegro			Nuno Melo			José Luís Carneiro			André Ventura			Mariana Leitão			Jorge Pinto			Paulo Raimundo			José Manuel Pureza			Inês Sousa Real		
Polling firm/Link	Fieldwork date	Pos.	Neg.	Net	Pos.	Neg.	Net	Pos.	Neg.	Net	Pos.	Neg.	Net	Pos.	Neg.	Net	Pos.	Neg.	Net	Pos.	Neg.	Net	Pos.	Neg.	Net	Pos.	Neg.	Net
Intercampus	6–12 Oct 2026	22.1	50.3	–28.2	14.2	42.5	–28.3	25.0	39.9	–14.9	34.8	47.3	–12.5	20.9	37.4	–16.5	—N/a	—N/a	—N/a	10.0	49.1	–39.1	10.7	49.3	–38.6	18.1	42.6	–24.5
Aximage	6–7 Oct 2026	34	59	–25	—N/a	—N/a	—N/a	36	51	–15	37	55	–18	—N/a	—N/a	—N/a	—N/a	—N/a	—N/a	—N/a	—N/a	—N/a	—N/a	—N/a	—N/a	—N/a	—N/a	—N/a
Aximage	14–15 Sep 2026	31	60	–29	24	52	–28	37	47	–10	37	55	–18	30	48	–18	27	45	–18	22	52	–30	20	52	–32	28	46	–18
Intercampus	7–14 Sep 2026	18.4	51.7	–33.3	10.7	48.2	–37.5	21.1	43.2	–22.1	31.9	51.7	–19.8	19.2	36.0	–16.8	—N/a	—N/a	—N/a	8.0	56.9	–48.9	7.4	53.1	–45.7	14.8	48.6	–33.8
Aximage	20–21 Jul 2026	32	61	–29	27	47	–20	39	44	–5	36	57	–21	30	46	–16	28	48	–20	20	54	–34	21	53	–32	29	46	–17
Polling firm/Link	Fieldwork date	Luís Montenegro			Nuno Melo			José Luís Carneiro			André Ventura			Mariana Leitão			Rui Tavares			Paulo Raimundo			José Manuel Pureza			Inês Sousa Real		
Polling firm/Link	Fieldwork date	Pos.	Neg.	Net	Pos.	Neg.	Net	Pos.	Neg.	Net	Pos.	Neg.	Net	Pos.	Neg.	Net	Pos.	Neg.	Net	Pos.	Neg.	Net	Pos.	Neg.	Net	Pos.	Neg.	Net
Intercampus	9–14 Jul 2026	25.5	51.0	–25.5	14.6	42.2	–27.6	22.2	41.7	–19.5	27.0	57.7	–30.7	20.5	38.9	–18.4	24.9	35.2	–10.3	10.9	52.9	–42.0	9.6	48.4	–38.8	15.1	45.0	–29.9
Aximage	24–25 Jun 2026	41	49	–8	30	47	–17	39	43	–4	36	56	–20	29	49	–20	35	43	–8	25	52	–27	25	50	–25	28	47	–19
Intercampus	10–16 Jun 2026	20.6	51.9	–31.3	8.0	52.7	–44.7	29.3	32.1	–2.8	25.9	57.8	–31.9	15.1	42.7	–27.6	24.9	33.0	–8.1	10.5	49.0	–38.5	10.8	44.5	–33.7	15.5	41.2	–25.7
Intercampus	8–14 May 2026	25.4	48.4	–23.0	13.5	45.9	–32.4	26.5	29.2	–2.7	22.8	62.7	–39.9	17.8	38.5	–20.7	26.4	34.0	–7.6	12.1	51.2	–39.1	9.0	47.3	–38.3	13.4	46.4	–33.0
Intercampus	8–14 Apr 2026	25.7	47.9	–22.2	9.7	53.1	–43.4	23.2	37.1	–13.9	25.0	60.4	–35.4	14.3	42.6	–28.3	25.0	38.4	–13.4	9.9	52.6	–42.7	10.8	49.5	–38.7	13.3	48.0	–34.7
Aximage	2–3 Mar 2026	44	46	–2	28	44	–16	38	40	–2	32	60	–28	26	46	–20	32	41	–9	20	52	–36	19	46	–27	26	44	–18
Intercampus	12–16 Dec 2025	25.5	44.8	–19.3	13.4	43.2	–29.8	25.2	36.7	–11.5	32.0	51.2	–19.2	20.8	37.1	–16.3	25.9	33.7	–7.8	13.1	51.9	–38.8	11.1	47.3	–36.2	14.7	42.2	–27.5
Polling firm/Link	Fieldwork date	Luís Montenegro			Nuno Melo			José Luís Carneiro			André Ventura			Mariana Leitão			Rui Tavares			Paulo Raimundo			Mariana Mortágua			Inês Sousa Real		
Polling firm/Link	Fieldwork date	Pos.	Neg.	Net	Pos.	Neg.	Net	Pos.	Neg.	Net	Pos.	Neg.	Net	Pos.	Neg.	Net	Pos.	Neg.	Net	Pos.	Neg.	Net	Pos.	Neg.	Net	Pos.	Neg.	Net
Intercampus	14–19 Nov 2025	35.0	38.7	–3.7	12.9	44.9	–32.0	22.4	31.9	–9.5	29.5	55.3	–25.8	17.4	37.2	–19.8	26.0	36.3	–10.3	13.4	51.4	–38.0	10.6	63.8	–53.2	12.0	47.5	–35.5
Aximage	23–27 Oct 2025	49	40	+9	32	48	–16	42	40	+2	33	60	–27	32	45	–13	36	42	–6	21	59	–38	19	68	–49	30	45	–15
Intercampus	20–26 Oct 2025	30.2	36.5	–6.3	15.2	43.5	–28.3	23.8	35.3	–11.5	24.9	57.4	–32.5	22.1	35.3	–13.2	25.4	35.8	–10.4	8.2	50.0	–41.8	10.3	64.9	–54.6	14.8	44.0	–29.2
Aximage	2–5 Sep 2025	40	51	–11	30	45	–15	34	45	–11	40	50	–10	29	46	–17	33	41	–8	21	54	–33	25	59	–34	30	44	–14
Intercampus	7–14 Aug 2025	35.6	37.6	–2.0	10.3	44.0	–33.7	22.5	32.4	–9.9	29.7	49.7	–20.0	16.1	33.0	–16.9	28.6	29.3	–0.7	11.5	49.6	–38.1	13.1	58.1	–45.0	17.0	40.7	–23.7
Intercampus	11–18 Jul 2025	34.3	35.5	–1.2	16.0	45.0	–29.0	26.1	28.1	–2.0	25.6	57.5	–31.9	15.7	34.3	–18.6	29.0	31.5	–2.5	10.1	57.0	–46.9	12.4	60.4	–48.0	12.4	44.6	–32.2
Polling firm/Link	Fieldwork date	Luís Montenegro			Nuno Melo			Pedro Nuno Santos			André Ventura			Rui Rocha			Rui Tavares			Paulo Raimundo			Mariana Mortágua			Inês Sousa Real		
Polling firm/Link	Fieldwork date	Pos.	Neg.	Net	Pos.	Neg.	Net	Pos.	Neg.	Net	Pos.	Neg.	Net	Pos.	Neg.	Net	Pos.	Neg.	Net	Pos.	Neg.	Net	Pos.	Neg.	Net	Pos.	Neg.	Net
Intercampus	5–15 Jun 2025	35.2	36.0	–0.8	12.5	42.7	–30.2	14.3	59.4	–45.1	22.7	58.9	–36.2	26.1	32.6	–6.5	28.9	30.4	–1.5	9.3	54.5	–45.2	10.3	63.0	–52.7	13.8	42.1	–28.3

=== Party leaders' ratings ===
Poll results showing the public opinion on all political party leaders rated from 0 to 10 (Note: Intercampus polls rate party leaders from 1 to 5. CESOP–UCP poll rates party leaders from 0 to 20. The results are adapted to match the ICS/ISCTE polls.) (with the former being strong disapproval and the latter strong approval) are shown in the table below in reverse chronological order (showing the most recent first).

Polling firm/Link	Fieldwork date	Luís Montenegro	Nuno Melo	Pedro Nuno Santos		André Ventura	Rui Rocha		Rui Tavares	Isabel Mendes Lopes	Paulo Raimundo	Mariana Mortágua	José Manuel Pureza	Inês Sousa Real	Élvio Sousa	Lead
ICS/ISCTE	16–25 Oct 2026	4.1	3.5	—N/a	4.5	3.9	—N/a	3.7	—N/a	3.9	3.2	—N/a	3.7	3.6	3.5	0.4
Intercampus	6–12 Oct 2026	5.0	5.2	—N/a	5.6	5.4	—N/a	5.6	5.6	—N/a	4.8	—N/a	4.8	5.2	—N/a	Tie
Intercampus	7–14 Sep 2026	4.8	4.8	—N/a	5.4	5.2	—N/a	5.4	—N/a	5.2	4.4	—N/a	4.4	4.8	—N/a	Tie
Intercampus	9–14 Jul 2026	5.2	5.0	—N/a	5.4	4.8	—N/a	5.4	5.6	—N/a	4.6	—N/a	4.6	5.0	—N/a	0.2
CESOP–UCP	6–10 Jul 2026	5.1	4.2	—N/a	4.9	3.8	—N/a	4.3	4.7	—N/a	3.8	—N/a	3.7	3.6	4.0	0.2
Intercampus	10–16 Jun 2026	5.0	4.6	—N/a	5.8	4.6	—N/a	5.2	5.8	—N/a	4.8	—N/a	4.8	5.2	—N/a	Tie
ICS/ISCTE	15–24 May 2026	4.6	3.3	—N/a	4.7	3.6	—N/a	3.7	3.9	—N/a	3.4	—N/a	3.6	3.6	3.4	0.1
Intercampus	8–14 May 2026	5.2	5.0	—N/a	5.8	4.4	—N/a	5.4	5.6	—N/a	4.8	—N/a	4.8	5.0	—N/a	0.2
Intercampus	8–14 Apr 2026	5.2	4.6	—N/a	5.6	4.6	—N/a	5.2	5.6	—N/a	4.6	—N/a	4.6	4.6	—N/a	Tie
ICS/ISCTE	27 Feb–8 Mar 2026	5.2	3.9	—N/a	5.0	3.9	—N/a	4.1	4.2	—N/a	3.4	—N/a	3.9	3.6	4.2	0.2
Intercampus	12–16 Dec 2025	5.4	5.0	—N/a	5.6	5.2	—N/a	5.4	5.8	—N/a	4.8	—N/a	4.8	5.0	—N/a	0.2
Intercampus	14–19 Nov 2025	5.8	5.0	—N/a	5.8	4.8	—N/a	5.4	5.6	—N/a	4.8	4.2	—N/a	5.0	—N/a	Tie
Intercampus	20–26 Oct 2025	5.8	5.2	—N/a	5.6	4.8	—N/a	5.6	5.6	—N/a	4.8	4.2	—N/a	5.2	—N/a	0.2
Intercampus	7–14 Aug 2025	5.8	5.0	—N/a	5.6	5.2	—N/a	5.4	5.8	—N/a	4.8	4.6	—N/a	5.2	—N/a	Tie
Intercampus	11–18 Jul 2025	5.8	5.0	—N/a	5.8	4.8	—N/a	5.4	5.8	—N/a	4.6	4.4	—N/a	5.0	—N/a	Tie
Intercampus	5–15 Jun 2025	5.8	5.0	4.6	—N/a	4.6	5.6	—N/a	5.8	—N/a	4.6	4.2	—N/a	5.0	—N/a	Tie

=== Cabinet approval/disapproval ratings ===
Poll results showing public opinion on the performance of the Government are shown in the table below in reverse chronological order, showing the most recent first.

Polling firm/Link	Fieldwork date	Sample size	Luís Montenegro's cabinet				
Polling firm/Link	Fieldwork date	Sample size	Approve	Disapprove	Neither	No opinion	Lead
Pitagórica	19 Oct–13 Nov 2026	804	33	62	—N/a	5	29
Pitagórica	12 Oct–6 Nov 2026	804	33	62	—N/a	5	29
Pitagórica	5–30 Oct 2026	804	32	61	—N/a	7	29
ICS/ISCTE	16–25 Oct 2026	808	18	75	—N/a	6	57
Pitagórica	28 Sep–23 Oct 2026	804	33	60	—N/a	7	27
Pitagórica	21 Sep–16 Oct 2026	804	35	58	—N/a	7	23
Intercampus	6–12 Oct 2026	615	20.2	50.3	27.0	2.6	23.3
Pitagórica	14 Sep–10 Oct 2026	804	34	59	—N/a	7	25
Aximage	6–7 Oct 2026	501	31	63	—N/a	6	32
Pitagórica	7 Sep–3 Oct 2026	804	35	59	—N/a	6	24
Pitagórica	31 Aug–26 Sep 2026	804	34	60	—N/a	6	26
Pitagórica	24 Aug–18 Sep 2026	804	35	59	—N/a	6	24
Aximage	14–15 Sep 2026	500	27	67	—N/a	6	40
Intercampus	7–14 Sep 2026	609	14.1	55.2	29.4	1.3	25.8
Pitagórica	18 Aug–12 Sep 2026	804	35	59	—N/a	6	24
Pitagórica	10 Aug–4 Sep 2026	804	35	58	—N/a	7	23
Aximage	20–21 Jul 2026	501	27	68	—N/a	5	41
GfK Metris	13–20 Jul 2026	800	40	36	21	2	4
Intercampus	9–14 Jul 2026	604	22.2	52.0	24.7	1.2	27.3
CESOP–UCP	6–10 Jul 2026	996	11	41	46	2	5
Aximage	24–25 Jun 2026	500	39	56	—N/a	6	17
Intercampus	10–16 Jun 2026	609	17.9	52.4	28.2	1.5	24.2
ICS/ISCTE	15–24 May 2026	803	27.6	61.1	—N/a	11.3	33.5
Aximage	18–19 May 2026	505	33	58	—N/a	9	25
Intercampus	8–14 May 2026	606	23.2	47.8	26.7	2.3	21.1
Aximage	6–7 May 2026	803	40	53	—N/a	8	13
Aximage	10–15 Apr 2026	500	41	54	—N/a	6	13
Intercampus	8–14 Apr 2026	608	19.2	51.9	26.8	2.0	25.1
ICS/ISCTE	27 Feb–8 Mar 2026	801	35	56	—N/a	9	21
Aximage	2–3 Mar 2026	551	42	51	—N/a	7	9
Intercampus	12–16 Dec 2025	611	22.2	45.9	30.4	1.5	15.5
CESOP–UCP	4–12 Dec 2025	1,185	17	32	49	2	17
Intercampus	14–19 Nov 2025	611	26.4	40.5	31.8	1.3	8.7
Aximage	23–27 Oct 2025	651	49	43	—N/a	8	6
Intercampus	20–26 Oct 2025	609	27.3	41.6	30.4	0.7	11.2
Aximage	2–5 Sep 2025	570	31	59	—N/a	10	28
Intercampus	7–14 Aug 2025	611	25.7	39.4	32.7	2.2	6.7
Intercampus	11–18 Jul 2025	606	26.2	39.6	32.7	1.5	6.9

== See also ==
- List of heads of the executive by approval rating
