= La Conquista (opera) =

Opera by Lorenzo Ferrero

- Opera by Lorenzo Ferrero
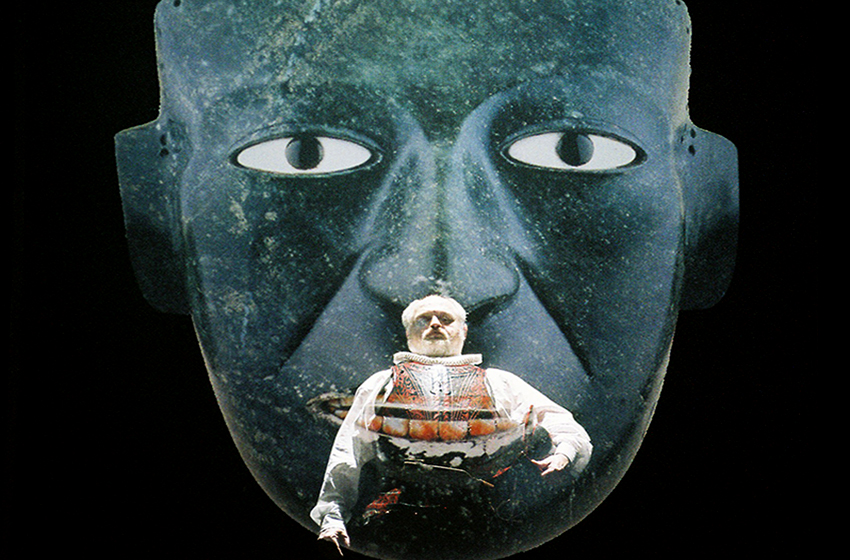
- Scene from the premiere
- Librettist: Ferrero; Frances Karttunen
- Language: English, Spanish, Nahuatl
- Based on: Concept by Alessandro Baricco, episode of the Spanish conquest of the Aztec Empire
- Premiere: 12 March 2005; National Theatre, Prague

La Conquista (also known as Montezuma) is an opera in two acts by Lorenzo Ferrero set to a trilingual libretto by the composer and Frances Karttunen, based on a concept by Alessandro Baricco. It depicts the major episodes of the Spanish conquest of the Aztec Empire in 1521 and the subsequent destruction of the Aztec civilization. The libretto (English-Spanish-Nahuatl) is a blend of historical and literary sources drawn from transcriptions of indigenous and European literature, both kept, with some exceptions, in their original languages. The texts are taken from The Truthful History of the Conquest of New Spain by Bernal Díaz del Castillo, the Book XII of the Florentine Codex, the works of Juan Boscán Almogáver, Bernardino de Sahagún, Lope de Vega, Heinrich Heine, and from Aztec prayers, songs and poems as collected in Cantares Mexicanos and Romances de los señores de Nueva España.

The musical language owes very little to ethnic influences, but the use of the Nahuatl language, characterized by the presence of distinct short and long vowels, imposes a specific rhythm to the vocal part.

== Performance history ==
The premiere directed by Nicholas Muni and conducted by Zbyněk Müller took place at the Prague National Theatre on 12 March 2005.

== Roles ==
Role	Voice type	Premiere cast, 12 March 2005 (Conductor: Zbyněk Müller)
Moctezuma, Tlatoani of Tenochtitlan	tenor	Jozef Kundlák
Hernán Cortés, Spanish conquistador	baritone	Ivan Kusnjer
Father Bartolomé de Olmedo, Mercedarian friar	bass	Jiři Kalendovský
Pedro de Alvarado, Spanish conquistador	tenor	Jaroslav Březina
Doña Marina, interpreter for Hernán Cortés	pop/rock/folk singer	Radka Fišarová
Aztecs, soldiers, chorus and dancers.

== Synopsis ==
Place: Cortés' camp at Villa Rica de la Vera Cruz and Tenochtitlan
Time: 1519–21

Act 1

The Aztec chronicles prophesy disaster in the years preceding the arrival of the Spanish. One day, the prayer of Emperor Moctezuma in the temple is interrupted by the entrance of a group of messengers who bring him the news of the Spanish landing on the Gulf coast. Moctezuma is visibly worried and asks the men to keep their knowledge secret. The Emperor makes an offering to the gods and a priest sprinkles the messengers with the blood of the victim, then they are sent back carrying a message and laden with gifts for the newcomers. Left alone, Moctezuma is scrutinizing the uncertain future.

In contemporary Mexico City a woman called Marina has strange dreams of a distant past. She decides to confront these recurring nightmares.

Moctezuma's emissaries arrive at the camp and lay out their presents before Cortés and his companions. The soldiers tie them up and frighten them by firing their guns in the air. Alvarado and Cortés argue about the priorities of the conquest, whether it should be a search for gold or the evangelization of indigenous peoples. When Cortés tries to force an Aztec to worship the cross, Father Olmedo advises against such violence and leads the delegation away. Cortés orders Alvarado to sink the ships, as a precaution against mutiny. While watching the ships burn Cortés laments that stepmother Spain ignores her true sons, who bring "infinite lands" to the king and "infinite souls" to God. During the fire Marina passes by and she and Cortés notice each other. She expresses conflicting thoughts and feelings about meeting this strange man.

Cortés leads his troops inland towards Tenochtitlan. The conquistadors set out across inaccessible mountains and after a long march fraught with many fights with the local tribes they reach Paso de Cortés overlooking the Valley of Mexico and get a "first glimpse of things never heard of, seen, or dreamed of before."

Act 2

The long-standing attempts to dissuade Cortés from coming to Tenochtitlan had failed. Moctezuma and Cortés meet on the Great Causeway leading into the capital. Coming from opposite sides in a long and complex ceremony the cortège of Moctezuma and the army of Cortés meet. The Emperor dresses Cortés with flowers from his own gardens, the highest honour he could give. In turn, Cortés attempts to embrace him but is restrained by a courtier. Marina is at the same time inside and outside the picture. She pantomimes the translating of the conversation while her offstage voice describes the scene. Finally Moctezuma invites the Spaniards into the city.

In the absence of Cortés, taking advantage of the religious ceremonies of the Aztecs in the Great Temple, Alvarado and his men massacre them. Cortés, away, thinks, writes, prays, but cannot decide upon the final act. News about the massacre reaches him and he returns to Tenochtitlan. In a small room where he is held captive, Moctezuma tries to answer the question "Why?" Severely wounded, he is dying and he worries about the future destiny of his land and people, but the question still persists.

The Aztecs revolt and drive out the invaders temporarily. In their retreat, the Spanish suffer heavy casualties. Marina wanders aimlessly among the victims. Her dream is now clear: this is the end of a world, one of many possible worlds, one of many possible dreams. The date 1 cōātl of the year 3 calli written in Aztec symbols transforms itself into the Western numeral system: 13 August 1521.

== Notable arias and excerpts ==
A version for chorus and orchestra was written in 2006 and first performed at Settembre Musica in Turin on 7 September 2006.

The opera was preceded by a set of six symphonic poems entitled La Nueva España. Written between 1990 and 1999, the cycle follows the chronological order of the historical events: 1. Presagios, 2. Memoria del fuego, 3. La ruta de Cortés, 4. El encuentro, 5. La matanza del Templo Mayor, and 6. La noche triste.

La Nueva España was recorded by Naxos and released in 2000.

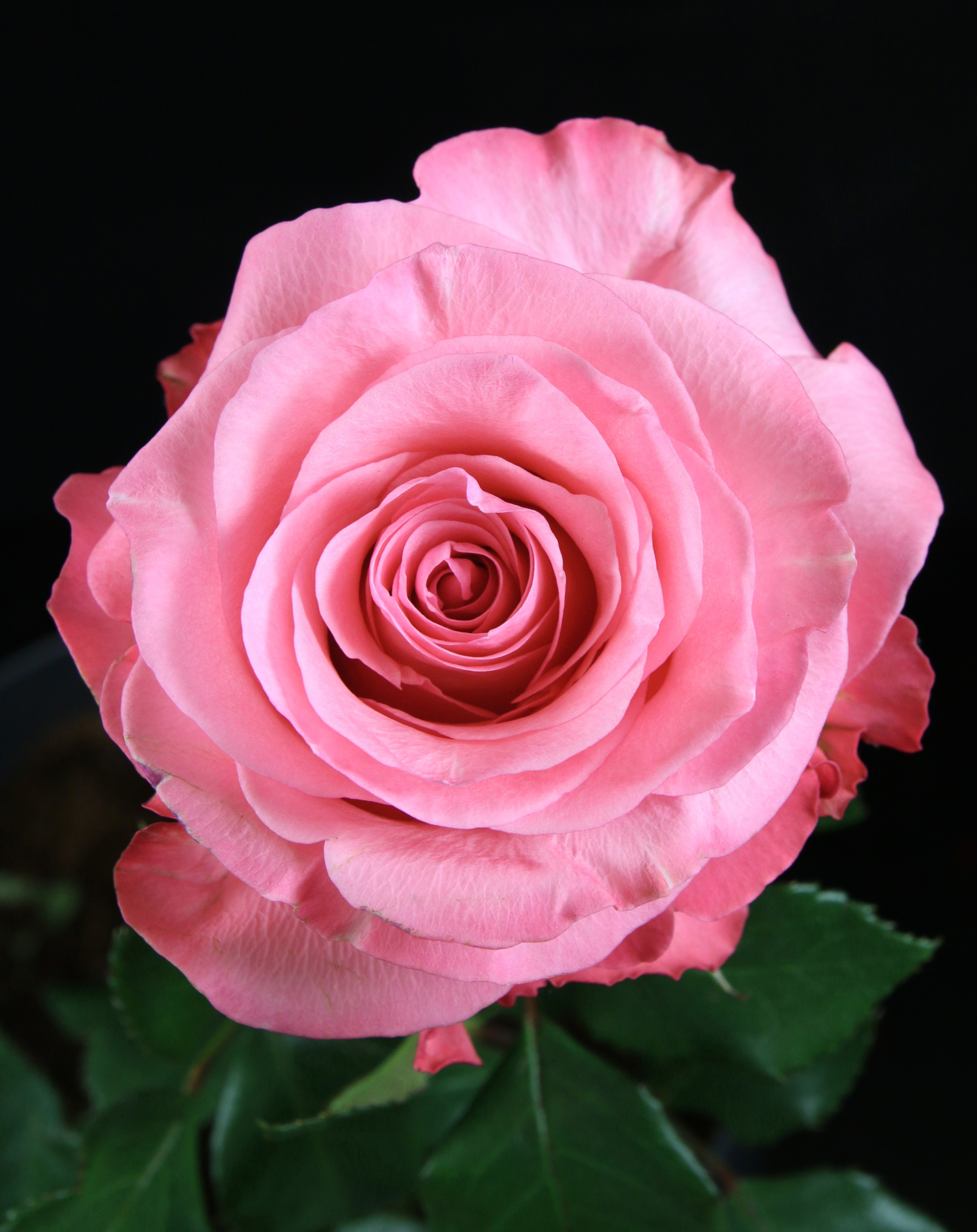
The Conquista rose

== Namesake ==
In 2014, a rose variety, Conquista, has been named after this opera. Conquista is a Spanish and Portuguese term meaning "conquest".
