= Reconquista (Portuguese nationalist group) =

- President: Afonso Gonçalves
- Founder: Afonso Gonçalves
- Founded: 2023; 3 years ago
- Ideology: Ethnic nationalism traditionalist conservatism
- Political position: Far-right

Website
- www.recon.pt

Reconquista is a Portuguese ultranationalist group, founded in June 2023 and led by Afonso Gonçalves and Alexandre Gazur. The group has become prominent within the context of the far-right in Portugal, particularly for its opposition to immigration and its advocacy of nationalist and culturally conservative positions.

== Characterization ==
The group's main focus is the defence of Portuguese national and ethno-cultural identity and the reduction of immigration to Portugal. Its name refers to the Reconquista, the historical period of expansion of Christian kingdoms in the Iberian Peninsula, which ended with the conquest of Granada in 1492.

Reconquista has been described by some sources as an ultranationalist and white supremacist movement. The group maintains contacts with Grupo 1143, associated with Mário Machado, notably through Twitter Spaces. Topics addressed by the group include immigration, national identity, issues concerning women's social roles, and the so-called "gender ideology". According to Afonso Gonçalves, one of Reconquista's objectives is to "radicalise politics in Portugal" and "form the elite of Portugal's future".

Afonso Gonçalves took part in a photoshoot in which he appeared with a moustache resembling that worn by Adolf Hitler, accompanied by the caption "Weimar conditions require Weimar solutions", a reference to the Weimar Republic and the period preceding the rise of the Nazi Party in Germany. According to the same source, Hitler is also a point of reference for Grupo 1143.

Gonçalves describes Reconquista as a movement "with no party affiliation whatsoever" and, for that reason, rejects its classification as far-right. However, Gonçalves has participated in Chega party campaigns and expressed support for the party. The group maintains contacts with members of Juventude Chega, although disagreements have also occurred between members of the two organisations. João Antunes, then leader of Juventude Chega in Coimbra, published a photograph with Gonçalves accompanied by the message "Reconstruir Portugal #Reconquista". Francisco Araújo, then leader of Juventude Chega in Porto, used his Telegram channel to promote a Reconquista congress. Other members of Juventude Chega participated in debates and events with Reconquista members.

Some statements by Afonso Gonçalves and Alexandre Gazur concerning women and the social roles assigned to the sexes were criticised by members of Juventude Chega. Statements attributed to Gonçalves include the view that women should not have social media accounts or the right to vote, as well as remarks about the value of women who do not remain virgins until marriage. Joana Pinto Azevedo, then leader of Juventude Chega in Braga, publicly criticised some of these statements.

Following the 2024 legislative election, in which Chega won 50 seats in parliament, Reconquista began advocating a more restrictive immigration policy and promoting the concept of "remigration". Some sources use the term to describe proposals for the departure or expulsion of immigrants, including non-white people and their descendants. The concept was subsequently also observed in social media posts by members of Juventude Chega.

According to political scientist Vicente Valentim, author of O Fim da Vergonha, groups advocating more radical positions may maintain informal relationships with political parties without being formally integrated into their structures. Political scientist Riccardo Marchi considers that Afonso Gonçalves and Mário Machado identified the growth of Chega as an opportunity to promote certain political positions, despite the differences between these groups and the party. Marchi also states that previous attempts to integrate members of these groups into Chega were rejected by the party's leadership.

Heidi Beirich, a researcher and co-founder of the GPHAE project, considers that groups of this kind may pose risks related to hate crime and terrorism, as well as influence political debate and human rights. Beirich's assessments differ from those of Riccardo Marchi, who considers that these groups do not constitute a significant threat in the Portuguese context.

According to Cátia Moreira de Carvalho, a researcher specialising in extremism and radicalisation, certain young people may be more predisposed to joining extremist movements when they perceive social and cultural changes as threats to their identity. The researcher links this phenomenon to opposition to gender equality and changes in the social roles traditionally assigned to women.

Reconquista, along with Grupo 1143, was mentioned in Portugal's Annual Internal Security Report (RASI) for 2023. The report refers to the emergence of projects and organisations seeking to expand the dissemination of extremist messages among young people and mentions projects with ideological affinities to the far right, including patriarchal and misogynistic positions.

=== Founders and leadership ===
Afonso Gonçalves, founder and leader of Reconquista, at the head of a group march.

According to the Global Project Against Hate and Extremism (GPAHE), which included the organisation in its October report on hate and far-right extremist groups in Portugal, Gonçalves "is a white supremacist and misogynist who presents himself as an authoritarian leader", describing himself as transphobic, ultranationalist, racist, and xenophobic. He began his activism on social media in 2022, inspired by André Ventura's entry into parliament in 2019, launching his Telegram channel with a video entitled "o feminismo é uma doença" (feminism is a disease). Another of his first posts was a photograph in which he simulated slapping Inês Sousa Real, a member of parliament from the PAN party.

Gonçalves is particularly known for his misogyny, as well as his criticism of women's suffrage, casual sex, and women sitting in public, referring to them as "prostitutes" and "cockroaches". Gonçalves argues that women who divorce should not "have the right to receive money/assets" from their husbands and should be required to "pay for the damage caused to the family". He considers abortion a crime against humanity and calls for women who undergo the procedure to receive the death penalty. According to Gonçalves, "non-traditional families" are an "abomination", "80% of all divorces are initiated by women", and people of African descent are creating a "population replacement" of people of European descent. He has argued that "African-American men are 12 times more likely to commit murder than white men".

Gonçalves stated that "Brazilian immigration to Portugal and its consequences are the main threat to Portugal's survival", frequently associating Brazilian women with prostitution, as well as any woman who attends a gym, uses social media, or expresses an opinion. The extreme nature of his prejudices led Twitter to suspend both his main and secondary accounts for "abusive behaviour", although they have since been reinstated.

The other founding member, Alexandre Lima Gazur, a computer engineer from Viseu, is a far-right YouTuber who serves as a co-organiser and promoter of Reconquista protests. He is a member of Chega and served as a delegate at the party's 5th National Convention, held in his hometown. He is known for his antisemitism and belief in "Jewish control" of the world. In response to the publication of the GPAHE report on Portugal, Gazur accused the organisation of being funded by George Soros, a recurring theme among antisemitic and conspiratorial groups.

Gazur is known for racist and controversial comments, such as those made in response to a Twitter video concerning politicians Katar Moreira and Ossanda Liber, as well as attacks on Chega MP Marcus Santos, whom he described as "preto africano, que fala brasileirês" (African black man who speaks Brazilian Portuguese). Like Gonçalves, Gazur believes that a "population replacement" of the Portuguese people is under way, referring to the "Great Replacement" conspiracy theory. He has argued that deporting all immigrants who use the healthcare system "for free" would solve 90% of the system's problems. He called for young people attending LGBT pride events to be "arrested by the state". On his Telegram channel, he regularly shares messages from American white supremacist and Holocaust denier Nick Fuentes and neo-Nazi Andrew Anglin. Following Elon Musk's acquisition of Twitter, his account was restored, but was subsequently suspended again.

Anti-Brazilian sentiment is one of the most widespread themes promoted by several Reconquista members. In addition to claiming that Brazilian immigration poses a significant threat to the preservation of Portuguese identity, the group argues, drawing on the fact that Brazil is one of the most violent countries in the world, that Brazilians as a whole are inherently more prone to violence, with a per capita homicide rate 46 times higher than that of Portuguese people.

=== Activism ===
Most Reconquista supporters are white men of Portuguese descent. Individuals identified by the GPAHE through its Telegram channels include Nita, a tradwife who participated in the demonstration at the SEF; Miguel Morato, a nationalist skinhead associated with Grupo 1143 and Mário Machado's channel "Racismo contra Europeus", who attended both the anti-Muslim demonstration and the protest at the SEF; and Carlos José Martelo Pagará, a candidate for the far-right Ergue-te party in Évora in 2022, who appeared at the 4 July demonstration. Ricardo Camões Coutinho, described by the GPAHE as a white supremacist, a Chega member and a delegate for Aveiro at the party's 5th convention, also took part in the demonstration. The average age of members is 23, and alignment with misogynistic views is one of the requirements.

The group combines street activism with a strong online presence, integrating the two types of activity. Street activities, such as protests and the installation of banners and stickers bearing xenophobic slogans in public places, are filmed and photographed. The material is then used to produce content for platforms such as Telegram and TikTok, where it reaches younger audiences. According to the 2023 RASI, the growth of the far right among younger generations was "largely due to efforts in the virtual sphere, making it its main vehicle for disseminating propaganda and a driver of radicalisation, thereby contributing to the spread of extremist narratives, which reach a wider and more diverse audience".

As the group grew and its membership increased, it became more professionalised, hiring a web designer. Its early videos, recorded without microphones or editing, gave way to more elaborate productions, with standardised language and carefully developed marketing strategies. Its communication strategy also involves national and international coordination between groups with similar views, such as the Invictus Portucale page, which has nearly 100,000 followers on social media, and Rádio Genoa, an international digital platform that publishes false and decontextualised news about immigration and is a partner of Reconquista and Grupo 1143.

The reach of the group's narrative has been limited by platform moderation mechanisms, which led YouTube to remove Reconquista's original channel during the release of the first videos in the "A Grande Invasão" series. Its Twitter/X accounts were also banned, although they have since returned.

=== A Grande Invasão ===
The group produced a series of 18 videos entitled A Grande Invasão (The Great Invasion), which Diário de Notícias described as one of the best examples of anti-immigration propaganda aimed at exploiting the population's confirmation bias. The production is based on the Great Replacement conspiracy theory, associated with Nazi-fascist and white nationalist ideology, which has been repeatedly mentioned by André Ventura and is one of the foundations of the European Identity and Democracy (ID) group, of which Chega is a member. According to Gonçalves, the objectives were to "make population replacement a subject of national debate" and to "bring this reality into every Portuguese household before the election". When published on social media, all posts were accompanied by the hashtag #Chega and were widely shared by members of that party. The series was released up to the legislative election of 10 March 2024, suggesting that its purpose may indeed have been to create a favourable environment for Chega in that election.

Each video was filmed in a different district of the country, beginning in the Porto District, and featured stories that reinforced Chega's narrative that immigrants are criminals, do not work, and live on benefits. This narrative led the party to include in its electoral programme measures considered unconstitutional, such as creating the offence of illegal residence and prohibiting access to social benefits during the first five years of residence. Gonçalves took information out of context and edited the footage to conceal answers, without informing participants of the actual purpose of the interviews, thereby steering their responses towards the desired conclusions. Most of the immigrants interviewed did not speak Portuguese or even had difficulty understanding English. Participants who concealed their faces and asked not to be filmed, including applicants for international protection, were nevertheless exposed. Gonçalves entered hotels and youth hostels where asylum seekers were temporarily accommodated, as provided for by law and in accordance with European Union rules, consistently portraying the guests as "people living at the state's expense" and frequently publishing material ridiculing them.

According to Gonçalves, the production cost €4,500 and was financed through donations solicited in posts containing MB WAY, PayPal, and Bitcoin details for those who did not wish to leave a record of their donation.

== History ==
The group emerged in June 2023, when its leaders, Afonso Gonçalves and Alexander Gazur, travelled to Évora with the intention of "invading and disrupting very aggressively" the city's annual LGBTQIA+ Pride Month event, the "Pride dos pequeninos". Gonçalves attempted to interrupt the event for 10 to 15 minutes by shouting through a loudspeaker, but was stopped by a barrier formed by police officers and Pride participants. Although only three to five people gathered for the protest, media coverage attracted the attention of supporters of the far-right political party Chega, some of whom had already harassed members of Évora's Pride Month earlier that week and expressed support for their actions. The new group attracted a number of supporters through a formal registration process, establishing Reconquista as a movement.

On 4 July, the group organised a demonstration at Martim Moniz Square in Lisbon under the slogan "Não há Portugal B" (There is no Plan B for Portugal), a variation of the environmentalist slogan "There is no Planet B". On 29 July, Reconquista gathered again, this time outside the Foreigners and Borders Service (SEF), to protest against a plan to regularise the status of approximately 170,000 immigrants who were facing legal uncertainty while awaiting the renewal of their residence permits due to the COVID-19 pandemic. Although the plan did not involve bringing more immigrants to Portugal, but rather regularising those already in the country, the group gathered outside the empty SEF office in Lisbon to protest against what it considered evidence of "population replacement", a phrase echoing the white nationalist conspiracy theory known as the "Great Replacement".

In September 2023, members disrupted the public launch of the book "No meu bairro", by Lúcia Vicente, at a bookshop in Lisbon, prompting widespread condemnation, including from the then President of the Assembly of the Republic, Augusto Santos Silva.

In October 2023, Gonçalves officially launched the group at a congress held in Lisbon on 21 October, the date on which Afonso I of Portugal captured Lisbon from the Moors. The group's platform calls for the mass deportation of non-European immigrants and the promotion of the return of Portuguese emigrants, the abolition of legal abortion, the abolition of no-fault divorce, the banning of "Marxist parties" and the promotion of feminism, as well as the "termination and expropriation of all institutes and organisations that promote hatred of Portugal".

In January 2024, the group launched an 18-part video series entitled A Grande Invasão, anti-immigration propaganda aimed at exploiting the population's confirmation bias and based on the Great Replacement conspiracy theory associated with Nazi-fascist and white nationalist ideology.

On 25 April 2024, during celebrations marking the 50th anniversary of the Carnation Revolution, approximately 20 Reconquista members demonstrated at Praça do Comércio, under police escort, advocating, among other positions, the Great Replacement conspiracy theory.

A poll conducted by Intercampus on behalf of the movement between 10 and 31 July 2026, based on 803 interviews and released in September, gave Reconquista 5.2% of voting intentions in a legislative election; according to the movement, 31.3% of respondents said they would consider voting for it.

== Congresses ==
=== 1st Congress, Lisbon, 21 October 2023 ===
- Speakers: Afonso Gonçalves, Lucas Claro, Francisco Araújo, and João Antunes.

=== 2nd Congress, Lisbon, 2 November 2024 ===
- Speakers: Afonso Gonçalves, Bernardo Abreu, Sérgio Tavares, Francisco Araújo, Riccardo Marchi, João Antunes, Father João Silveira (surprise guest), Thierry Baudet, Steve Laws, Dries Van Langenhove, and Keith Woods.
- Host: Jorge Pinto.
- Notable guests: Lieutenant Colonel Brandão Ferreira, Rui Amiguinho, and Manuel Morgado.

=== 3rd Congress, Porto, 8 November 2025 (live broadcast) ===
- Speakers: Afonso Gonçalves, Afonso Carvalho, Guilherme Ferreira, Manuel Morgado, António Sousa Lara (awarded at the congress), Lieutenant Colonel Brandão Ferreira, Martin Sellner, Keith Woods, Steve Laws, Jared Taylor, Hilaire Bouyé, and Lena Kotré.
- Video message: Lena Kotré and Pedro Frazão.
- Musical performance: José Campos e Sousa.
- VIP guests: João Antunes and Reinhild Bossdorf.
- Venue: The event was initially scheduled to take place at the Francisco de Assis Auditorium of Colégio Luso-Francês, a Catholic school in Porto, but the school cancelled the use of the venue on the eve of the event, one day after its location had been revealed by the newspaper Expresso. The event was ultimately held at the Maia Sport pavilion in Maia, on the same day as a festival organised by a neo-Nazi group in the same municipality.

== See also ==
- Racism in Portugal
