= Conquista, Spain =

Coordinates: 38°24′31″N 04°30′03″W

Conquista
- Municipality
- Concello de Conquista
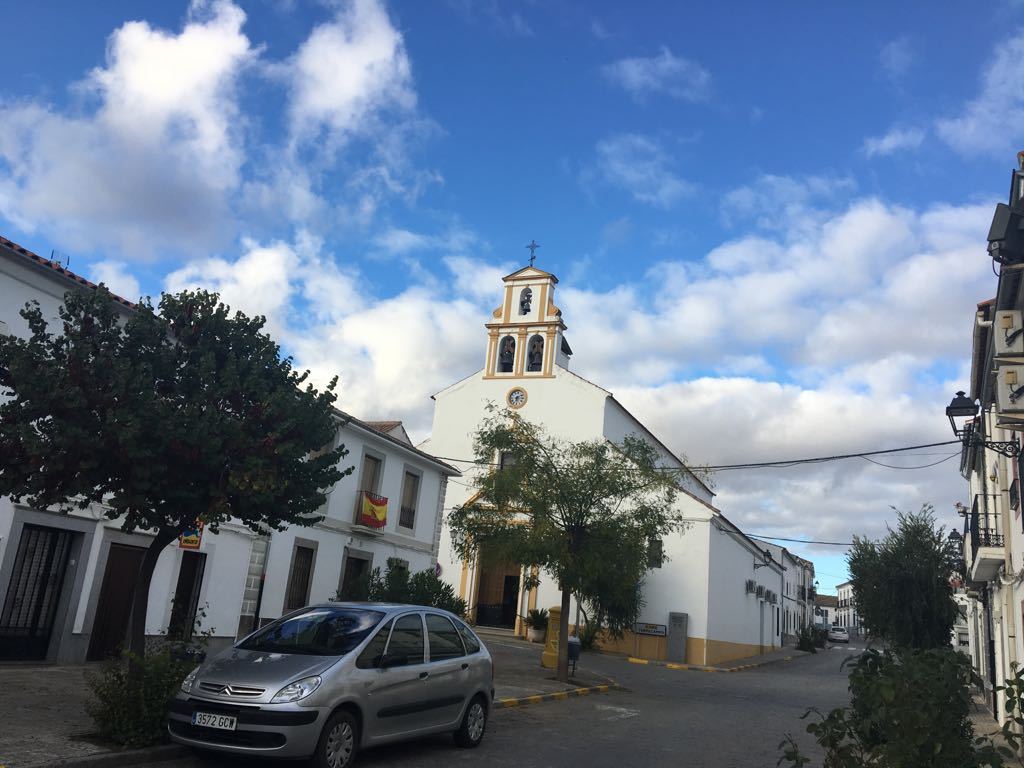
- Interactive map of Conquista
- Country: Spain
- Autonomous community: Andalusia
- Province: Córdoba
- Comarca: Los Pedroches
- Demonym: Conquistan
- Time zone: UTC+1 (CET)
  - Summer (DST): UTC+2 (CEST)

Conquista is a municipality in the province of Córdoba, Spain.

== See also ==
- List of municipalities in Córdoba
