= Conquista rose =

Flowering plant cultivar

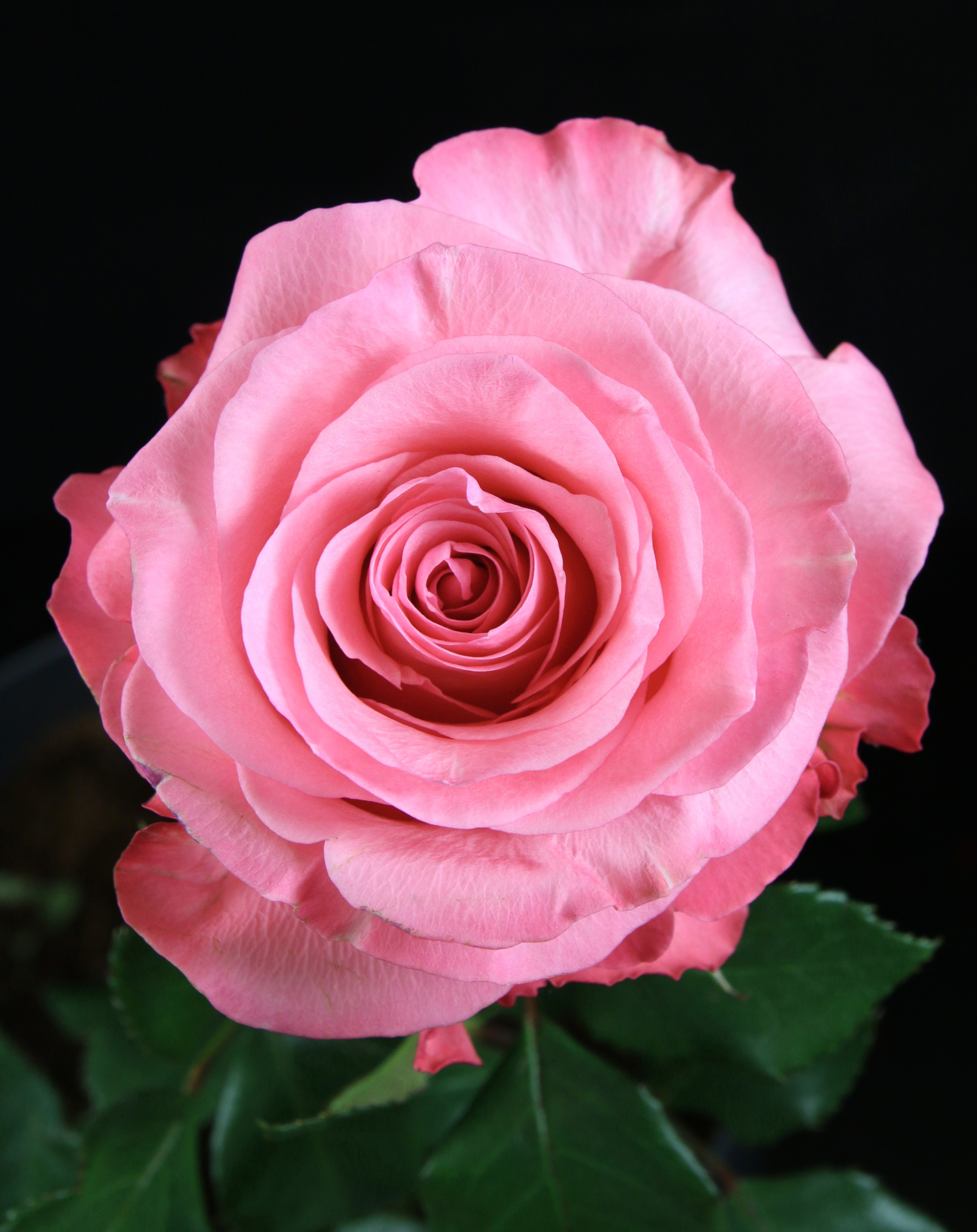
- Close-up of flower
- Genus: Rosa hybrid
- Cultivar group: Hybrid tea
- Cultivar: 'RUICH1069A'
- Marketing names: Conquista
- Origin: De Ruiter, 2014

The Conquista rose, registered under the name 'RUICH1069A', is a modern soft pink hybrid tea rose cultivar developed in Holland by De Ruiter Innovations B.V. and introduced in 2014. Conquista is a Spanish term meaning "conquest".

== Description ==
The plant is tall-growing, upright and compact. The cupped flowers have a bright, unfading colour with a suffused rose reverse. The large blooms develop from urn-shaped buds and grow singly on firm stems, which vary in length from 40 to 70 cm. They open slowly, reach an average diameter of 9 cm, have 40 to 45 petals (tight bloom), and are not scented. The variety is almost thornless and has glossy foliage with serrated leaves of a dark green colour.

== Cultivation ==
The rose is bred for cultivation in greenhouses or grown in pots, but can tolerate outside temperatures. It is generally disease-resistant and ideal for warm situations. The long-stemmed flowers are showy and long-lasting and are well suited as cut flowers.

== Namesake ==
The Conquista rose was named after the 2005 opera La Conquista by Italian composer Lorenzo Ferrero.

== See also ==
- Floriculture
- Garden roses
