= Cinq-Mars' Farewell to Marie d'Entraigues =

Painting by Claudius Jacquand

Cinq-Mars' Farewell to Marie d'Entraigues or The Kiss Goodbye
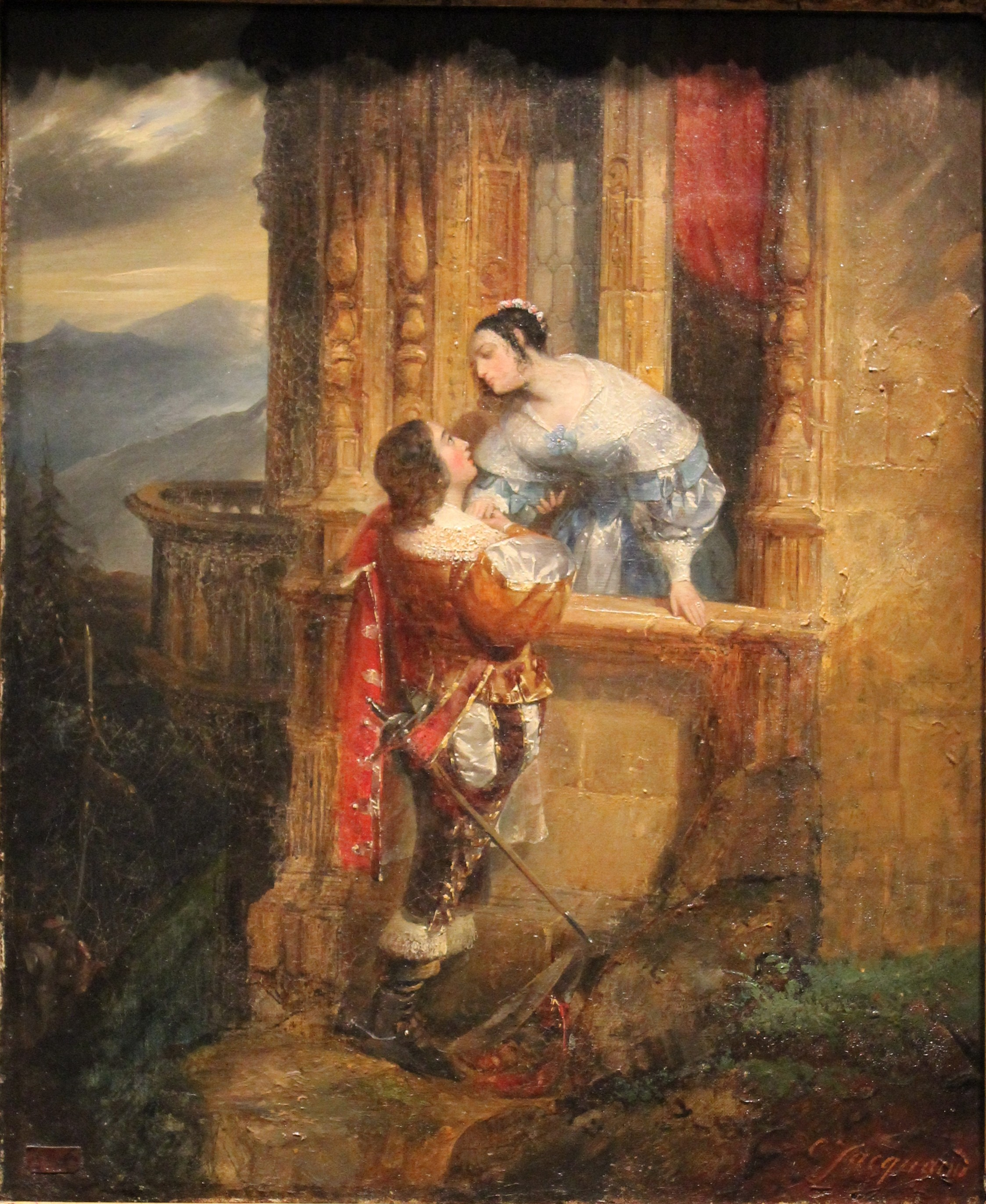
- Artist: Claudius Jacquand
- Year: 1836
- Medium: Oil on canvas
- Dimensions: 46,4 cm × 38,4 cm (183 in × 151 in)
- Location: Musée des beaux-arts de Lyon, Lyon

Cinq-Mars' Farewell to Marie d'Entraigues (French - Les Adieux de Cinq-Mars à Marie d'Entraigues) or The Kiss Goodbye (le Baiser du départ) is a painting by Claudius Jacquand in 1836, which is kept at the Musée des beaux-arts de Lyon.

== History ==
Henri Coiffier de Ruzé d'Effiat, Marquis of Cinq-Mars (1620 - 1642), was a "favourite" of King Louis XIII. After plotting against Cardinal Richelieu he was tried and decapitated with his comrade de Thou in the Place des Terreaux, Lyon.

In 1826, Alfred de Vigny published a historical novel inspired by this event, entitled Cinq-Mars), which piqued the interest of historical painters. In 1829, Paul Delaroche produced The State Barge of Cardinal Richelieu on the Rhône and in 1835 Claude Jacquand displayed a first work, Cinq-Mars et de Thou, depicting the two men being led to their execution, at the Salon of 1835. In 1836, Jacquand presented a new work to the Salon of 1836, initially entitled Le baiser du départ, after the first chapter of de Vigny's novel.

== Description ==
The composition is inspired by the famous balcony scene from Shakespeare's Romeo and Juliet.

== Legacy ==
Jacquand continued his series of paintings on this theme with Cinq-Mars rendant son épée à Louis XIII (Cinq-Mars Presents his Sword to Louis XIII) and with two further works Cinq-Mars à Perpignan (Cinq-Mars at Perpignan) and Cinq-Mars allant au supplice (Cinq-Mars Going to his Execution), which were displayed in the Salon in 1837.

The scene in Les Adieux de Cinq-Mars à Marie d'Entraigues was reproduced in a more serious form by Charles Vogt in 1853.

In 2014, it was displayed at the Musée des beaux-arts de Lyon as part of the exhibition L'invention du Passé. Histoires de cœur et d'épée 1802-1850.

== Bibliography ==
- Musée des Beaux-Arts de Lyon, ed. (2014). L'Invention du Passé. Histoires de coeur et d'épée en Europe 1802-1850 (Exhibition Catalogue) (in French). Vol. 2. Paris: Hazan. ISBN 978-2-7541-0760-0. catMBA.
