= Cinq-Mars Handing his Sword to Louis XIII =

Painting by Claudius Jacquand

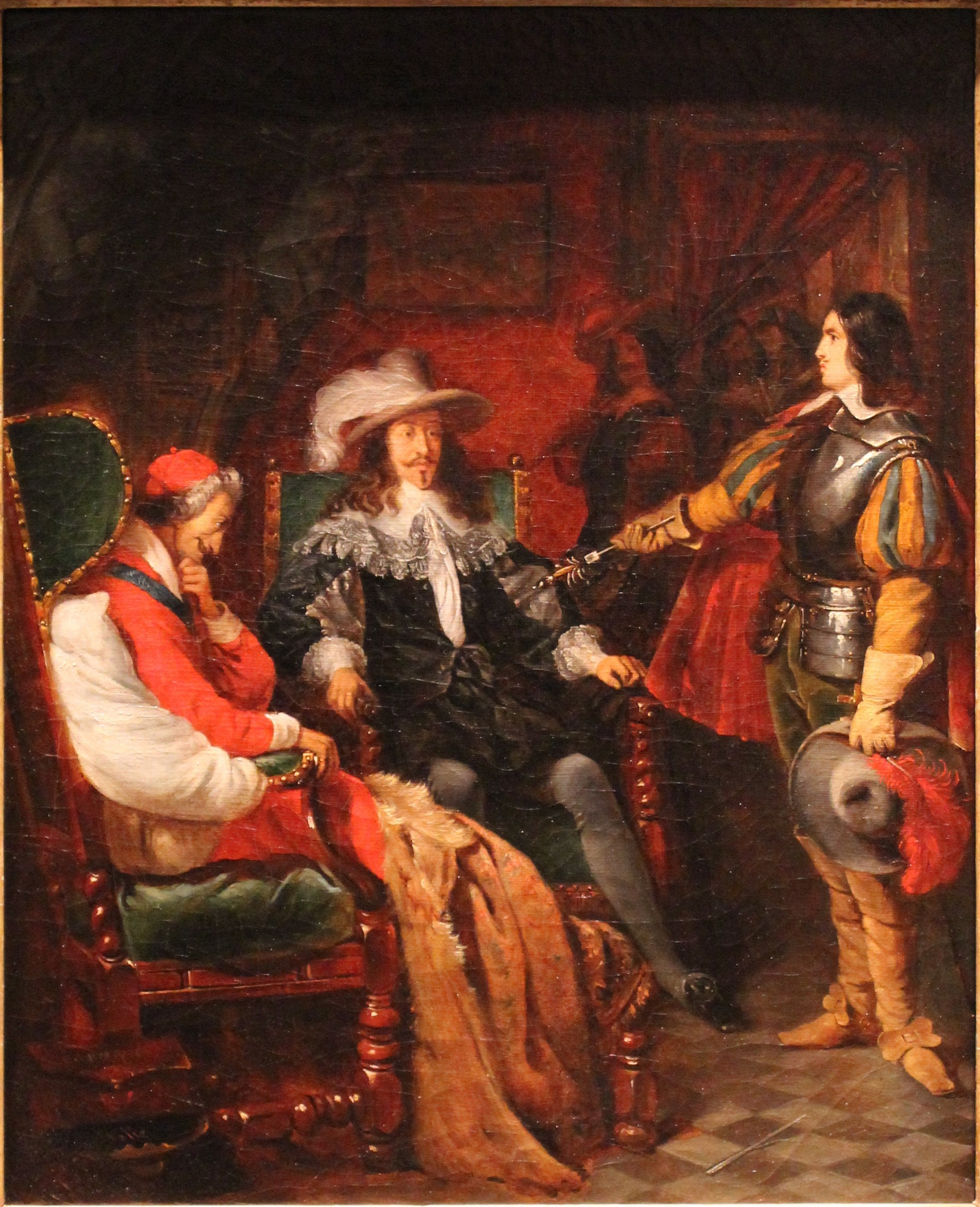
Cinq-Mars Handing his Sword to Louis XIII (1836-1837) by Claudius Jacquand

Cinq-Mars Handing his Sword to Louis XIII (French – Cinq-Mars rendant son épée à Louis XIII) is a c. 1836–1837 painting by Claudius Jacquand. The work was inspired by the 1826 historical novel Cinq-Mars by Alfred de Vigny. It is now held at the Royal Monastery of Brou, though it also appeared in the 2014 exhibition L'invention du passé. Histoires de cœur et d'épée en Europe, 1802–1850.

== Sources ==
- http://www.peintures-descours.fr/evenement/exposition-troubadour/
