= Cinq-Mars (opera) =

Opera in four acts by Charles Gounod

- Opera by Charles Gounod
- Poster for the first production
- Librettist: Paul Poirson; Louis Gallet
- Language: French
- Based on: Alfred de Vigny's historical novel
- Premiere: 5 April 1877; Opéra-Comique, Paris

Cinq-Mars, subtitled Une conjuration sous Louis XIII, is an opera in four acts by Charles Gounod to a libretto by Paul Poirson and Louis Gallet loosely adapted from Alfred de Vigny's historical novel Cinq-Mars.

== Performance history ==
Cinq-Mars was initially performed at the Opéra-Comique on 5 April 1877. The work's reception was lukewarm: "If [it] adds nothing to the glory of Gounod, neither does it diminish it." The opera ran for 56 performances. Some critics seized on the straddling of the genres of grand opéra and opéra comique; a second edition (Léon Grus, n.d.) contains recitatives for the very few spoken scenes as well as an act 3 cantabile for de Thou, written for the La Scala production.

It was revived by Leipzig Opera in May 2017, conducted by David Reiland, in a production by Anthony Pilavachi, with Mathias Vidal in the title role.

== Roles ==
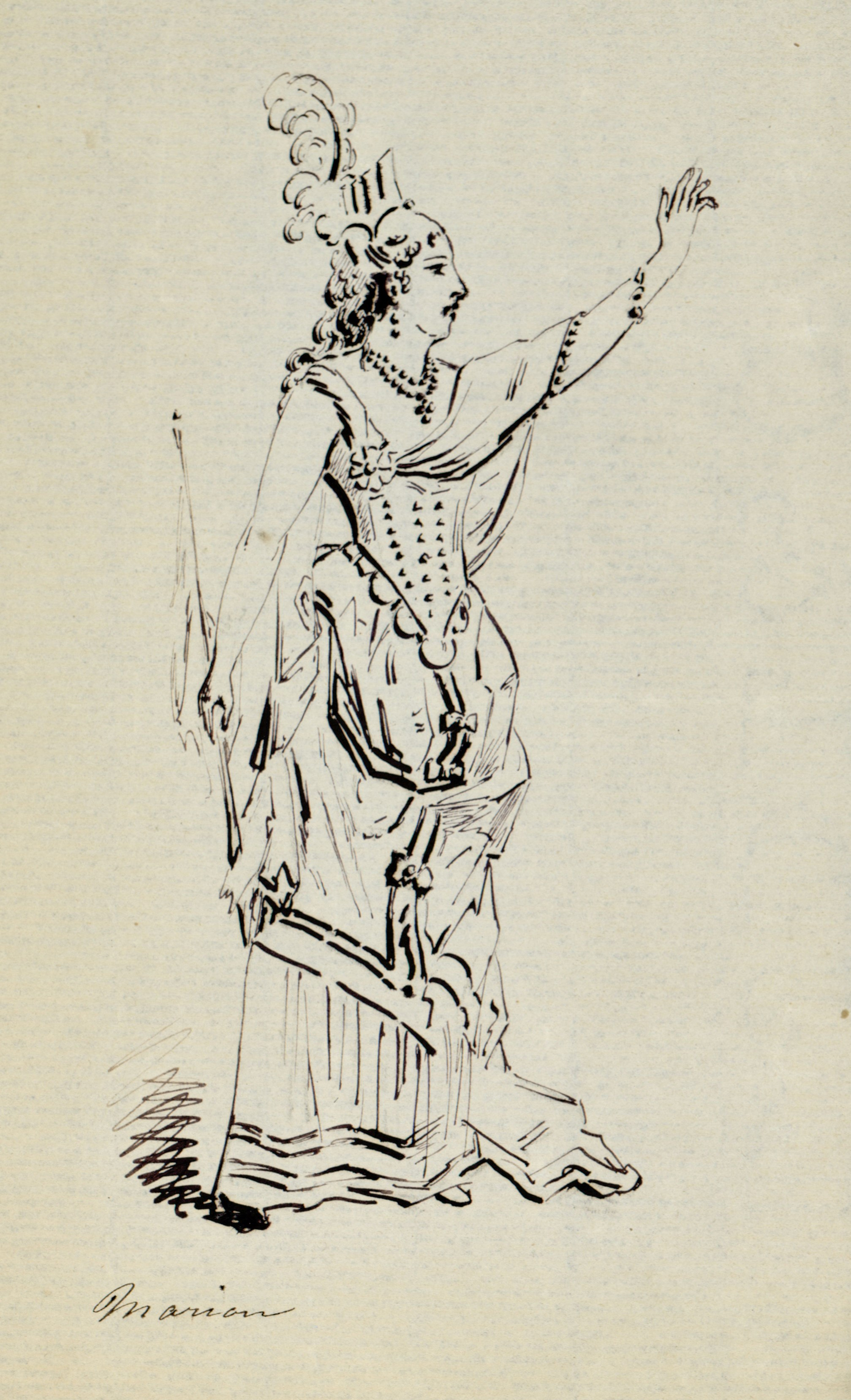
Marion (soprano), costume design for Cinq-Mars (1877)

Roles, voice types, premiere cast
Role	Voice type	Premiere cast, April 5, 1877 Conductor: Charles Lamoureux
Henri Coiffier de Ruzé, Marquis of Cinq-Mars	tenor	Dereims
Le conseiller de Thou	baritone	Stéphanne
Père Joseph, an emissary of Cardinal Richelieu	bass	Giraudet
Le vicomte de Fontrailles	baritone	Barré
Le roi (Louis XIII of France)	bass	Maris
Chancellor	bass	Bernard
De Montmort	tenor	Lefèvre
De Montrésor	bass	Teste
De Brienne	baritone	Collin
De Monglat	tenor	Chenevière
De Château-Giron	baritone	Villars
Eustache, a spy	bass	Davoust
Princesse Marie de Gonzague	soprano	Chevrier
Marion Delorme	soprano	Frank-Duvernoy
Ninon de l'Enclos	soprano	Périer

== Synopsis ==
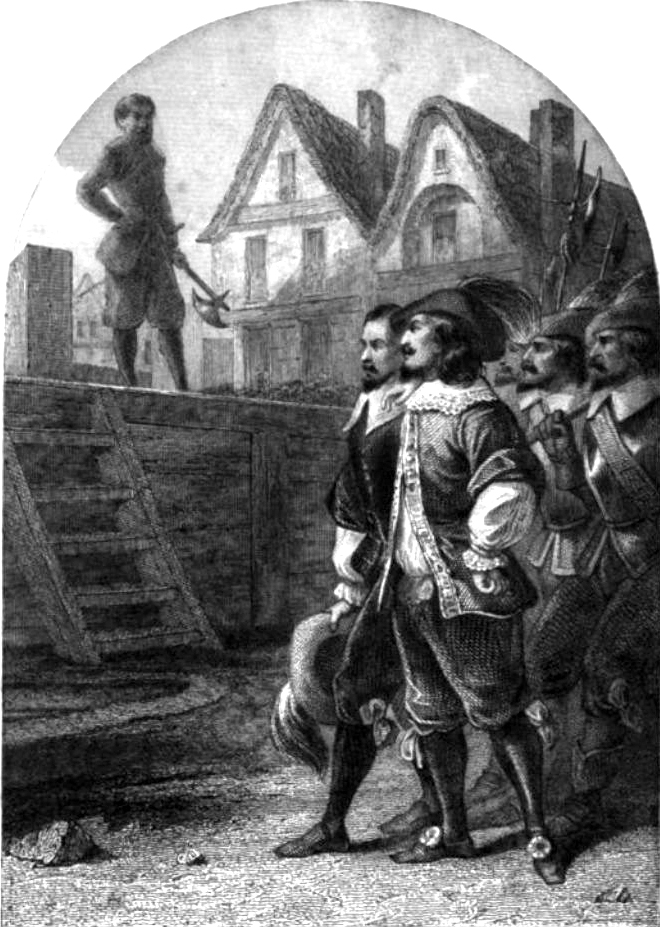
The execution of Cinq-Mars and François de Thou on 12 September 1642

The plot faithfully follows the external events of the failed revolt of the French nobility against Richelieu's consolidation of power (Count de Soissons's conspiracy), but adds a secret love affair between the Marquis of Cinq-Mars and princess Marie de Gonzague. Whereas de Vigny's character yearned to become her social equal, the opera's hero enters politics only on learning of a planned marriage between Marie and the king of Poland. After the conspiracy is discovered, she is given a chance to save him by agreeing to the match, but her sacrifice is in vain: before their escape plans can be put into effect, the hour of execution is suddenly moved forward.

=== Act 1 ===
The castle of the marquis de Cinq-Mars

A choir of noblemen celebrates the imminent importance Cinq-Mars is going to take ("A la Cour vous allez paraître"); some suggest that he owes his debt of allegiance to the Cardinal of Richelieu, and others to the King. For his part, Cinq-Mars shows himself indifferent to the questions of political order. Alone with his closest friend, de Thou, he confesses that he loves princess Marie de Gonzague ("Henri! Vous nous parliez"). They recognize both intuitively that this affair will end badly. The guests reappear: among them is Father Joseph, the spokesman for the Cardinal of Richelieu, and the Princess Marie. The first one announces that Cinq-Mars is called to the royal court, and that a marriage is arranged between Princess Marie and the King of Poland. Cinq-Mars and Marie agree to meet later in the evening. After the departure of the guests, Marie wishes her heart to be at peace in the sweetness of the night ("Nuit resplendissante"). Cinq-Mars walks in and declares his love to her; before he leaves, she declares herself in turn ("Ah! Vous m'avez pardonné ma folie").

=== Act 2 ===
Scene 1: The King's apartments

After a choir sings the beauty of courtesan Marion Delorme ("A Marion, reine des belles"), Fontrailles, Montrésor, Montmort, de Brienne, Monglat, and the other courtesans discuss the increasing influence of Cinq-Mars over the King. The nobles are dissatisfied with the excessive power that the Cardinal of Richelieu has assumed, and they wonder if Cinq-Mars will join finally their cause. Marion reports that the Cardinal threatens to exile Cinq-Mars; Fontrailles is surprised, and is sure that Paris would become very boring without its elegant salons ("On ne verra plus dans Paris"). Marion announces that she will organize a ball the next day, which will give them the opportunity to cast the basis of an intrigue to eliminate the Cardinal. Cinq-Mars appears and is welcomed by the courtesans ("Ah! Monsieur le Grand Ecuyer"). Marie has just arrived at the Court, and the two lovers are reunited ("Quand vous m'avez dit un jour"). However, just after this blessed moment, Father Joseph comes to announce that, in spite of the King's informal agreement of Cinq-Mars's marriage with Marie, the Cardinal refuses to formalize their union, preferring rather to follow the original plan of marrying Marie to the King of Poland.

Scene 2: At Marion Delorme's apartments

The evening begins with the reading of Madeleine de Scudéry's last novel, Clélie, followed by a long pastoral entertainment with ballet, including notably a sonnet sung by a shepherd ("De vos traits mon âme est navrée"). More serious things are on everyone's mind, however ("Viendra-t-il?"). Fontrailles assures everyone that Cinq-Mars will join the plot, as he predicted, and that Cinq-Mars will arrive soon. He declares that the King is no longer in total control of the country, and that the eviction of the Cardinal is a just cause; civil war is imminent, and he assures his co-conspirators that he arranged a treaty with Spain, which implies that their armies will intervene on their side. De Thou suddenly interrupts him, and warns him against opening France up to a foreign power, but the marquis remains resolute.

=== Act 3 ===
The next day. Outside of a chapel

A meeting of the conspirators is imminent. Marie appears, contrary to all expectations, and agrees with Cinq-Mars to immediately exchange wedding vows ("Madame, c'est le lieu du rendez-vous"). After their departure, Father Joseph and Eustache appear from a hiding place: Eustache is a spy and makes a complete report of the intrigue to Father Joseph. Father Joseph savors the power which he possesses on the fate of Cinq-Mars ("Tu t'en vas"). He confronts Marie with the announcement of the execution of Cinq-Mars, for betraying the country by dealing independently with a foreign power. Further, he tells her, the Polish ambassador will return soon from a hunt with the King, and Father Joseph advises Marie to answer him favorably; in exchange, Cinq-Mars will be spared. When the royal suite arrives, Marie capitulates ("Hallali! Chasse superbe").

=== Act 4 ===
A prison

As he waits for execution, Cinq-Mars regrets that Marie abandoned him; nevertheless, his last hour approaching, he evokes her image by way of consolation ("O chère et vivante image"). Marie enters, explains the guile of Father Joseph, and admits that she always loved Cinq-Mars ("Ah! Qu'ai-je dit"). De Thou draws up the plan which has been prepared for the escape of Cinq-Mars the next day. When the chancellor and Father Joseph come to announce that the marquis will die before the dawn, it becomes clear that this plan will not happen ("Messieurs, appelez à vous, votre courage"). Before Cinq-Mars is brought to the gallows, he sings with de Thou a final prayer.

== Discography ==
- Mathias Vidal (Cinq-Mars), Véronique Gens (Marie), Tassis Christoyannis (De Thou), Andrew Foster-Williams (Joseph); Chor des Bayerischen Rundfunks, Münchner Rundfunkorchester, Ulf Schirmer (cond.). Palazzetto Bru Zane Ediciones Singulares (2016)
