= A Chronicle of the Reign of Charles IX =

1829 novel

- 1890 edition
- Author: Prosper Mérimée
- Language: French
- Genre: Historical
- Publication date: 1829
- Publication place: France
- Media type: Print

A Chronicle of the Reign of Charles IX (French: Chronique du règne de Charles IX) is an 1829 historical novel by the French writer Prosper Mérimée. It portrays events leading up to the St. Bartholomew's Day massacre of 1572 during the reign of Charles IX. The novel takes place at the time of the French Wars of Religion. Although many leading historical figures of the era appear including Charles IX, his mother Catherine de' Medici and the Huguenot leader Admiral Coligny, the focus is on two brothers one of whom is Catholic and the other Protestant. It was part of wave of French historical novels including Alfred de Vigny's Cinq-Mars and Victor Hugo's The Hunchback of Notre-Dame, inspired by the works of British author Walter Scott who enjoyed great popularity in France.

== Bibliography ==
- Hamnett, Brian . The Historical Novel in Nineteenth-Century Europe: Representations of Reality in History and Fiction. OUP Oxford, 2011.
- Hollier, Denis (ed.) A New History of French Literature. Harvard University Press, 1998.
- Logan, Peter Melville, George, Olakunle, Hegeman, Susan & Kristal, Efraín (ed.) The Encyclopedia of the Novel. John Wiley & Sons, 2014.
