= The State Barge of Cardinal Richelieu on the Rhône =

Painting by Paul Delaroche

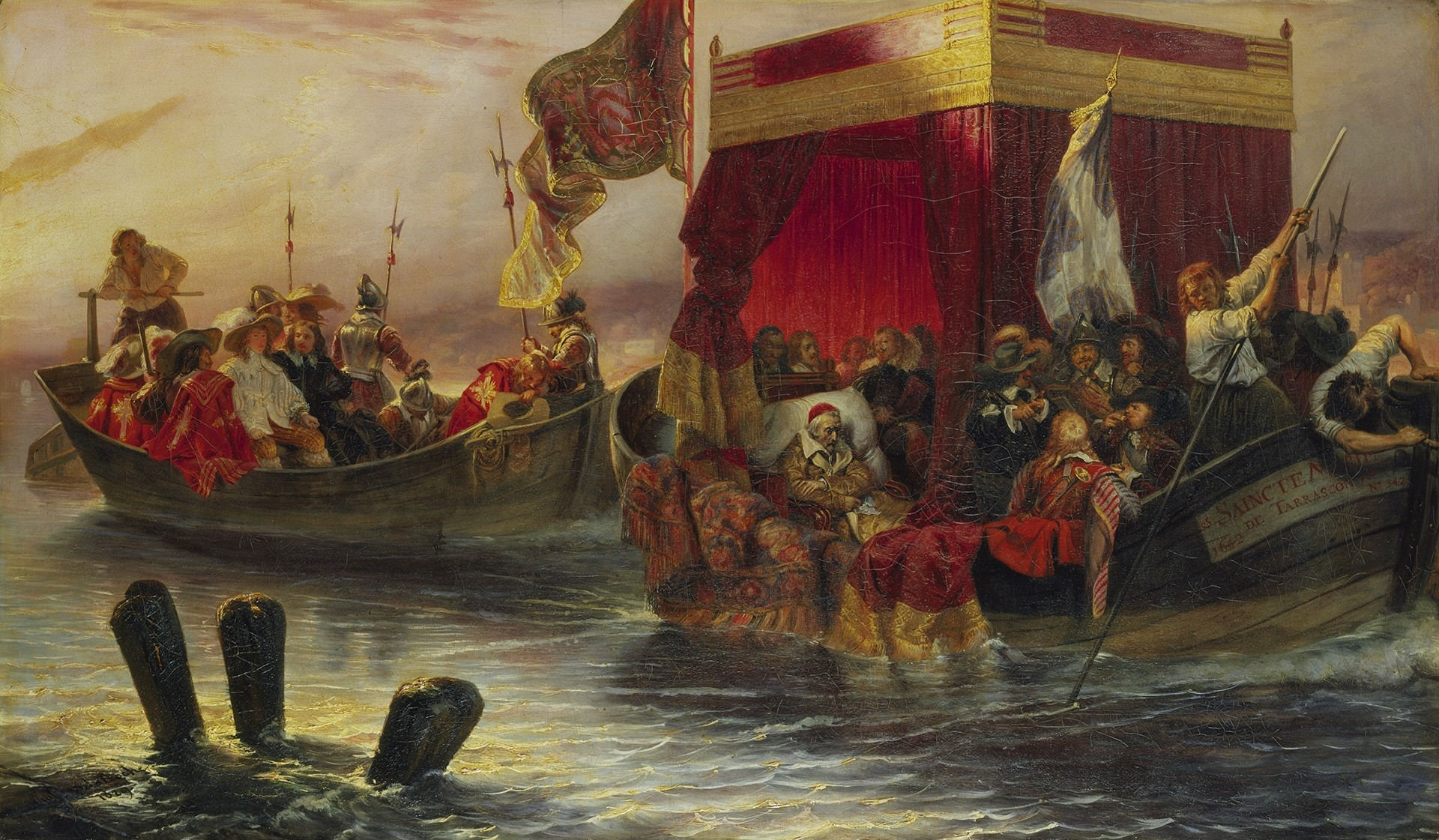
- Artist: Paul Delaroche
- Year: 1829
- Type: Oil on canvas, history painting
- Dimensions: 57.2 cm × 97.3 cm (22.5 in × 38.3 in)
- Location: Wallace Collection; London

The State Barge of Cardinal Richelieu on the Rhône is an 1829 history painting by the French artist Paul Delaroche. It depicts the state barge of Cardinal Richelieu on the River Rhône in Southern France. It is followed by another boat carrying two failed conspirators Henri Coiffier de Ruzé, Marquis of Cinq-Mars and François Auguste de Thou towards their execution. The events took place in 1642 during the reign of Louis XIII and the scene was portrayed in the 1826 novel Cinq-Mars by Alfred de Vigny.

It was exhibited at the Salon of 1831 at the Louvre in Paris. Today the painting is in the Wallace Collection in London, having been acquired by the Marquess of Hertford.

== Bibliography ==
- Duffy, Stephen. Paul Delaroche, 1797-1856: Paintings in the Wallace Collection. Trustees of the Wallace Collection, 2010.
- Goetschel, Willi. Heine and Critical Theory. Bloomsbury Publishing, 2019.
- Harding, James. Artistes Pompiers: French Academic Art in the 19th Century. Rizzoli, 1979.
