= A Nun Cares for a Soldier in a Cloister =

Painting by Claudius Jacquand

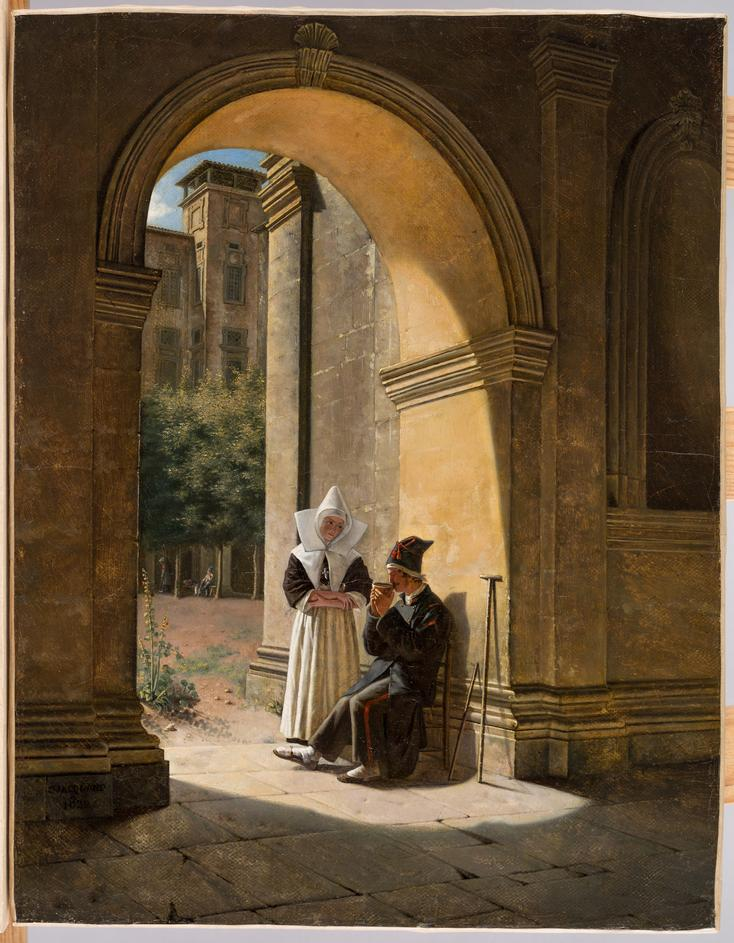
A Nun Cares for a Soldier in a Cloister (1822) by Claudius Jacquand

A Nun Cares for a Soldier in a Cloister is an 1822 painting by Claudius Jacquand, which has been in the Museum of Fine Arts of Lyon since 2015.

It is one of the first paintings by Claudius Jacquand. It has a size of 42 × 32 cm. It represents, as its name suggests, a soldier and a nun, who are located in the cloister of the Palais Saint-Pierre in Lyon, a building which now houses the Museum of Fine Arts of Lyon.
