= Servitude et grandeur militaires =

Book by Alfred de Vigny

Servitude et grandeur militaires is a book in three parts by Alfred de Vigny, published in 1835. Difficult to categorize, it is not a novel but a short story collection, sometimes loosely based on episodes within Vigny’s own experience. It is also a threefold meditation on the nature of military life: with diminishing enthusiasm Vigny had been an Army officer from 1814 to 1827.

The title of Servitude et grandeur militaires is difficult, if not impossible, to translate. One reasonable, but still inadequate, attempt at a translation would be “Glory and Submission: Aspects of Military Life”. The book has been published with at least five English titles, the most recent being the 2013 release: The Warrior's life.

The work records some of Vigny’s personal memories. More importantly, it is a record of his philosophy of military life and of life generally. It contains autobiographical elements, perhaps the most memorable of these being his account of the withdrawal of Louis XVIII to Ghent in March 1815, when, as a very young second lieutenant in the Garde Royale, he rode with the retreating royal party as far as Béthune.

The even more memorable scene of Napoleon’s encounter with Pope Pius VII at Fontainebleau was not one of Vigny’s personal memories.

== Component stories ==
The three parts of Servitude et grandeur militaires are the stories “Laurette ou le cachet rouge” (“Laurette, or the Red Seal”), “La Veillée de Vincennes” (“Late-Night Conversation at Vincennes”) and “La Canne de jonc” (“The Malacca Cane”). These are accompanied by essays “On the General Characteristics of Armies”, “On Responsibility” and on other related subjects.

“Laurette ou le cachet rouge”

The frame-narrator, writing from the standpoint of 1815, recounts events that occurred in 1797. This story told in the first person has as its frame Louis XVIII’s retreat to Ghent; it encloses the récit (flashback) of the battalion commander, who in earlier life had been a naval captain. Laurette, a child-bride, accompanies her husband when, in the custody of the naval captain, the young man is sentenced to be deported to French Guiana by order of the French Directory. A letter sealed with a large red seal, not to be opened until part way through the voyage, sentences the young man to death. The young man is shot on the cathead of the ship. His widow loses her reason and is cared for by the battalion commander, who resigns from the naval service to become a soldier and who takes her with him on his campaigns in a small cart pulled by a mule. Laurette dies three days after the commander is killed at the Battle of Waterloo.

“La Veillée de Vincennes”

The frame-narrator, writing from the standpoint of 1819, recounts the Adjutant Mathurin’s story of his youthful (anachronistic) friendship with the future playwright Michel-Jean Sedaine and of his young future wife Pierrette’s introduction in 1778 to the court of Marie Antoinette, Queen of France, when Princess Marie Louise of Savoy, Princesse de Lamballe, paints her portrait. Following this is the frame-narrator’s own story of the explosion, on 17 August 1815, at the powder-magazine at the fort of Vincennes. The Adjutant’s death in this explosion is related in the frame narrative. The story conveys a charming if rose-tinted impression of French eighteenth-century court life.

“La Canne de jonc”

The frame-narrator, writing from the standpoint of 1832, describes how in July 1830 he had met up again with a brother officer, Captain Renaud. In defence of the government of Charles X of France the captain is preparing, somewhat reluctantly, to take up arms for the last time. Reminiscing with the frame-narrator, he recalls “three defining moments” in his life. The first is Napoleon’s encounter with Pope Pius VII in 1804, which he happened to overhear as the Emperor’s page. The second comes when he is taken prisoner in 1809 by Admiral Cuthbert Collingwood, 1st Baron Collingwood. The third defining moment comes five years later, in the attack on a Russian guardhouse, when he kills a fourteen-year-old Russian soldier. By way of epilogue a subordinate frame-narrator takes over, describing how, during the three “glorious days” of the July Revolution of 1830, and sixteen years after the killing of the boy soldier, Renaud is shot by a boy who bears an uncanny resemblance to the young Russian. The principal frame-narrator finally takes up the story again, visiting Renaud on his deathbed and finding the street urchin grieving beside him.

“La Canne de jonc” is a complex interweaving of authorial commentary, frame narratives and récits. Narratively speaking, it is the most ambitious of the three stories. Its triadic structure mirrors that of Servitude et grandeur militaires as a whole.

== Vigny’s philosophical outlook ==
Vigny, like Honoré de Balzac in La Rabouilleuse, is aware that the concept of honour is vanishing from the modern world, as too is the supremacy of religion. Like Balzac again, he cannot help but contrast the austere Napoleonic code of values with the more self-serving attitudes of the Bourbon Restoration.

For Vigny and his contemporaries the age of glorious military valour is past. He follows Stendhal in this respect. It is an aspect of his Romanticism. In the modern world military service has become a matter of mere routine. It pained Vigny to accompany Louis XVIII on his withdrawal to the United Kingdom of the Netherlands, rather than have the glory of confronting Napoleon’s invading army.

If the “grandeur” of warfare has disappeared, what then of its “servitude” or “submission”? Vigny seeks to reconcile the individual’s autonomy of conscience with the soldier’s submissiveness to military discipline. In “le naufrage universel des croyances”, which he sees as characteristic of the modern era (and especially of the July Monarchy), he hopes for a religion of honour that will establish the civic virtues of personal responsibility, stoicism, self-abnegation and unselfish regard for others.

== Conclusion ==
On killing the boy soldier in the attack on the Russian guardhouse, Renaud asks himself: “What difference is there between myself and an assassin?” Overhearing the acrimonious conversation between Napoleon and Pope Pius VII, Renaud had been profoundly disillusioned by the despotic amoralism privately exhibited by Napoleon in his contemptuous treatment of the Pontiff. Yet Napoleon was a leader whom hundreds of thousands of soldiers followed with blind devotion.

Vigny contrasts the glory days of soldiering – the colourfulness and excitement of the heat of battle – with what he calls “modern soldiering”: this is a less colourful and glorious but a more ethical calling. In 1830, he writes, “l’armée de l’Empire venait expirer dans le sein de l’armée naissante alors, et mûrie aujourd’hui”. However, in proposing his concept of a “religion of honour”, he does not resolve the contradiction between absolute obedience to orders that can result in killing and the autonomous integrity of the categorical imperative which embodies the demands of conscience.

Vigny himself abandoned “the almost barbaric profession of warfare” before the so-called advent of the new soldiering, or, as he puts it, before he recovered from his “illness known as military enthusiasm”.

The Malacca cane, which provides the title of the third story, symbolizes tranquil bourgeois living, in a world in which the concept of honour is still of paramount importance. Carried by Captain Renaud, it replaces the previous chivalric concept of honour, whose symbol was the sword.

Unable to foresee the wars of Napoleon III and Otto von Bismarck, nor World War I and World War II, Vigny believed that warfare, annihilated by philosophy, commerce, and the marvels of modern technology, would gradually cease to be an instrument of political behaviour.

Historian Mark Mazower has written that the book is "An immortal depiction - gripping and vivid yet unsparingly unsentimental - of a generation forced to question as never before the place of war and the military values in modern life." In a 2013 article for the Financial Times, Mazower wrote that Vigny's work is still relevant, with Europe and to a lesser extent the U.S. currently facing decreased public support for the military, just as was the case in France after the Napoleonic wars.

== Translations ==
- Lights and Shades of Military Life, translated by Frederic Shoberl, edited by Major-General Sir Charles James Napier, London: 1840.
- The Military Necessity, translated by Humphrey Hare, London, Cresset Press: 1953.
- The Military Condition, translated by Marguerite Barnett, O.U.P.: 1964.
- The Servitude and Grandeur of Arms, translated by Roger Gard, London, Penguin Classics: 1996.
- The Warrior's Life, a re-release of Roger Gard's translation, London, Penguin Classics: 2013
