= Minuscule 601 =

- New Testament manuscript
- Text: Acts of the Apostles, Pauline epistles †
- Date: 13th century
- Script: Greek
- Now at: Bibliothèque nationale de France
- Size: 18.5 cm by 12.9 cm
- Type: Byzantine text-type
- Category: V
- Note: marginalia

Minuscule 601 (in the Gregory-Aland numbering), α 360 (von Soden), is a Greek minuscule manuscript of the New Testament, on paper. Palaeographically it has been assigned to the 13th century. The manuscript is lacunose. Formerly it was labelled by 121^{a} and 142^{p}.

== Description ==
The codex contains the text of the Acts of the Apostles, Catholic epistles, Pauline epistles on 257 paper leaves (size 18.5 cm by 12.9 cm), with lacunae (Titus, Philemon, Hebrews 1:1-5:2). Texts of Acts 1:1-5:20; 10:23-35; 13:4-16; He 8:13-10:7 were added by a later hand.

The text is written in one column per page, 23-24 lines per page. It contains Prolegomena, lists of the κεφαλαια (chapters) before each of the Gospels, the τιτλοι (titles) at the top of the pages, lectionary markings at the margin (for liturgical use), subscriptions at the end of each of the Gospels, Synaxarion, Menologion, and στιχοι.

== Text ==
The Greek text of the codex is a representative of the Byzantine text-type. Aland placed it in Category V.

== History ==
The manuscript belonged to Jacques Auguste de Thou († 1617), his son François Auguste de Thou († 1642), then to Colbert.

The manuscript was added to the list of New Testament manuscripts by Johann Martin Augustin Scholz. It was examined and described by Paulin Martin. Gregory saw the manuscript in 1885.

The manuscript currently is housed at the Bibliothèque nationale de France (Gr. 104), at Paris.

== See also ==
- List of New Testament minuscules
- Biblical manuscript
- Textual criticism
