= Éloa, ou La sœur des anges =

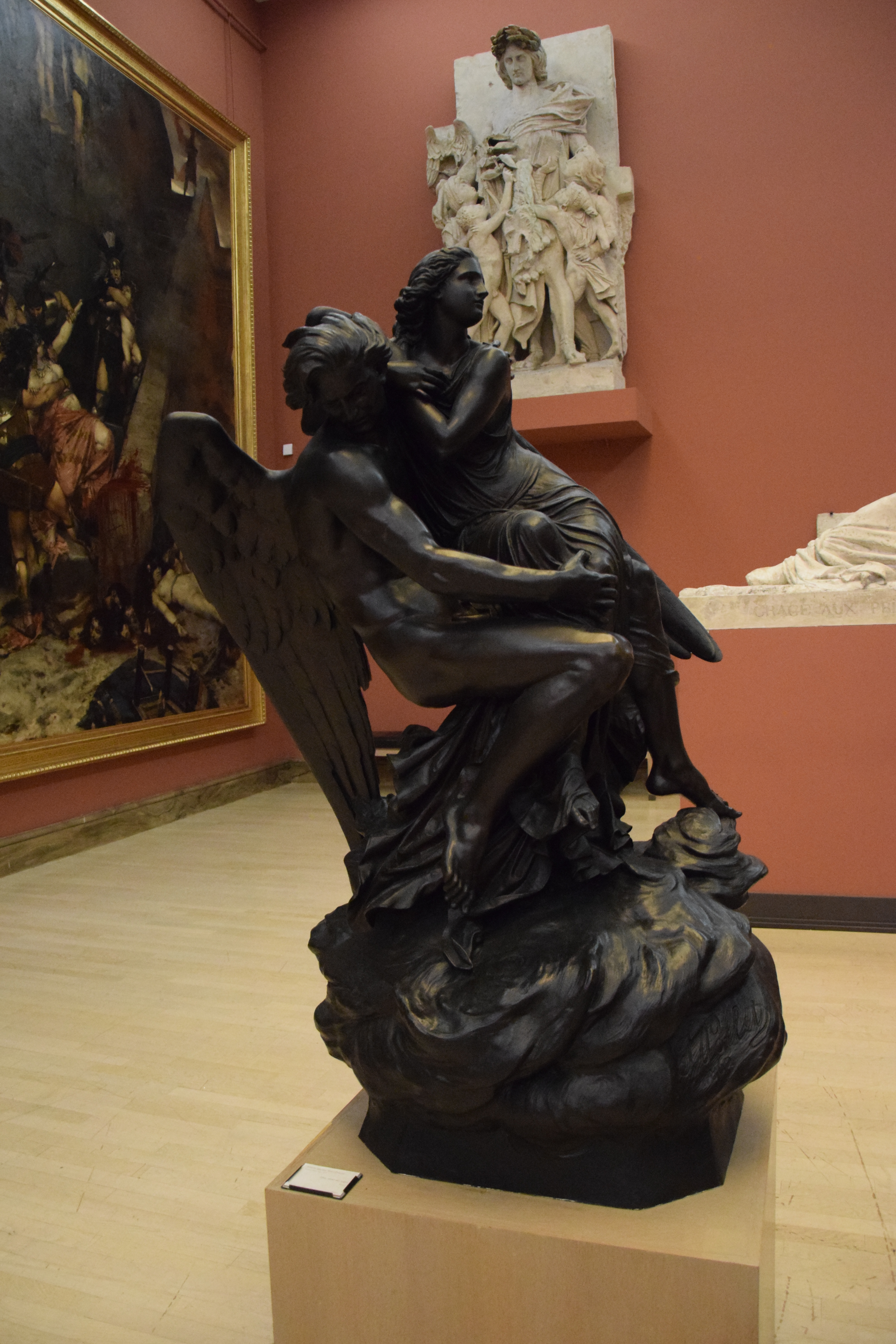
Éloa, la sœur des anges by Pollet

Éloa, ou La sœur des anges (Éloa, or the Sister of the Angels), published in 1824 (see 1824 in poetry), is Alfred de Vigny's tripartite philosophic epic poem of Eloa, an innocent angel born of Christ's tears, who falls in love with a stranger at odds with God. It is made clear that the stranger is Lucifer. He falls in love with the girl, but his own twisted notions of love prohibit him from returning the girl's affection in a proper way. In the end, the girl is unable to help Lucifer and he drags her to hell with him. Even as she is falling, she does not know who he is until he tells her his name. A translation into English by Alan D. Corré is available on Kindle; it includes the French text.

== Analysis ==
Lucretia S. Gruber argues that the poem is original in that it uplifts the feminine to the divine. In Christian tradition, the feminine is negatively perceived - for example, it is a woman, Eve, that causes the fall of man - and angels in Christian tradition are usually male. Vigny, in his poem, created an angel woman to instead try to redeem Lucifer and eradicate evil from the world, and described his heaven as populated with female as well as male angels.

The poem is believed to have influenced Russian poet Lermontov's Demon.
