= François Auguste de Thou =

French magistrate

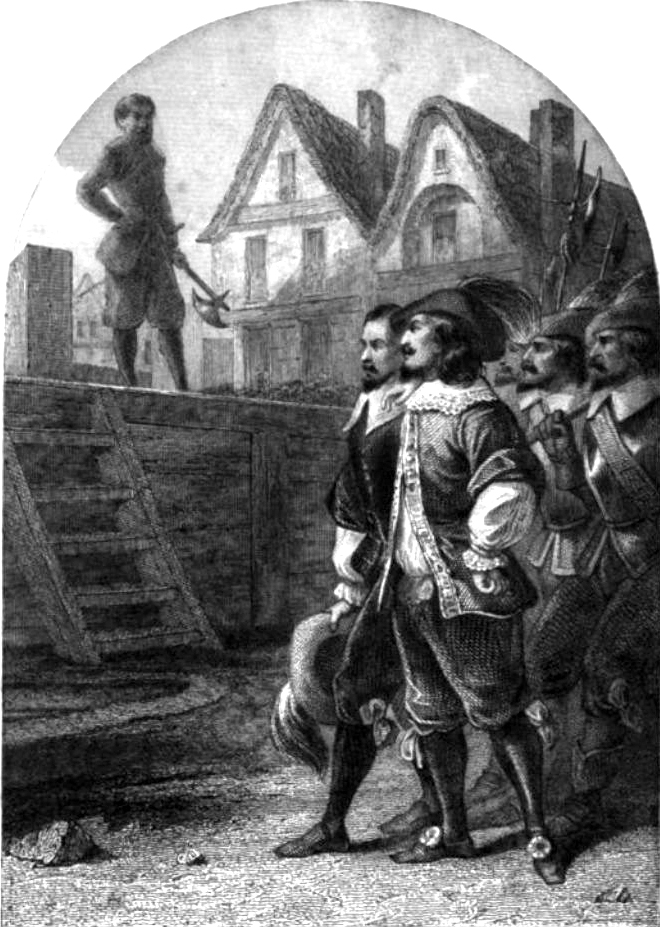
The Execution of Cinq-Mars and de Thou.

François-Auguste de Thou (24 August 1604 - 12 September 1642) was a French magistrate.

He was born in Paris, the eldest son of Jacques-Auguste de Thou and his second wife Gasparde de La Châtre.

== Political career ==
He was a councillor to the parliament of Paris in 1626 and a conseiller d'État shortly afterwards. From 1632 to 1635, he was steward of Burgundy and steward of the armies with Cardinal Louis de Nogaret of Valletta.

He was unwise enough to link himself to Cardinal Richelieu's enemies. His misguided mediation between Anne of Austria and Marie de Rohan was pardoned, but he fell in the conspiracy between Spain and Cinq-Mars, a favorite of king Louis XIII. For not revealing what he knew of the conspiracy, his silence was taken as proof of guilt and he was beheaded at Lyon on the same day as Cinq-Mars on Richelieu's orders.

== Interest in books ==
His father, a noted bibliophile, was Master of the Royal Library. When he died in 1617, Francois inherited the office despite his youth. He had the support of more experienced scholars. Nicolas Rigault, who had been working at the Royal Library since the time of the de Thou the Elder, produced a catalogue in 1622. Rigault was to write Pièces concernant l'Histoire; Mémoires et instructions pour servir à justifier l'innocence de Messire François-Auguste de Thou.

Francois was also involved with the large family library (which included such rarites as the Greek minuscule manuscript known as Minuscule 601). He had the support of Pierre Dupuy. The library eventually passed outside the family, being acquired by Jean-Jacques Charron.

== Legacy ==
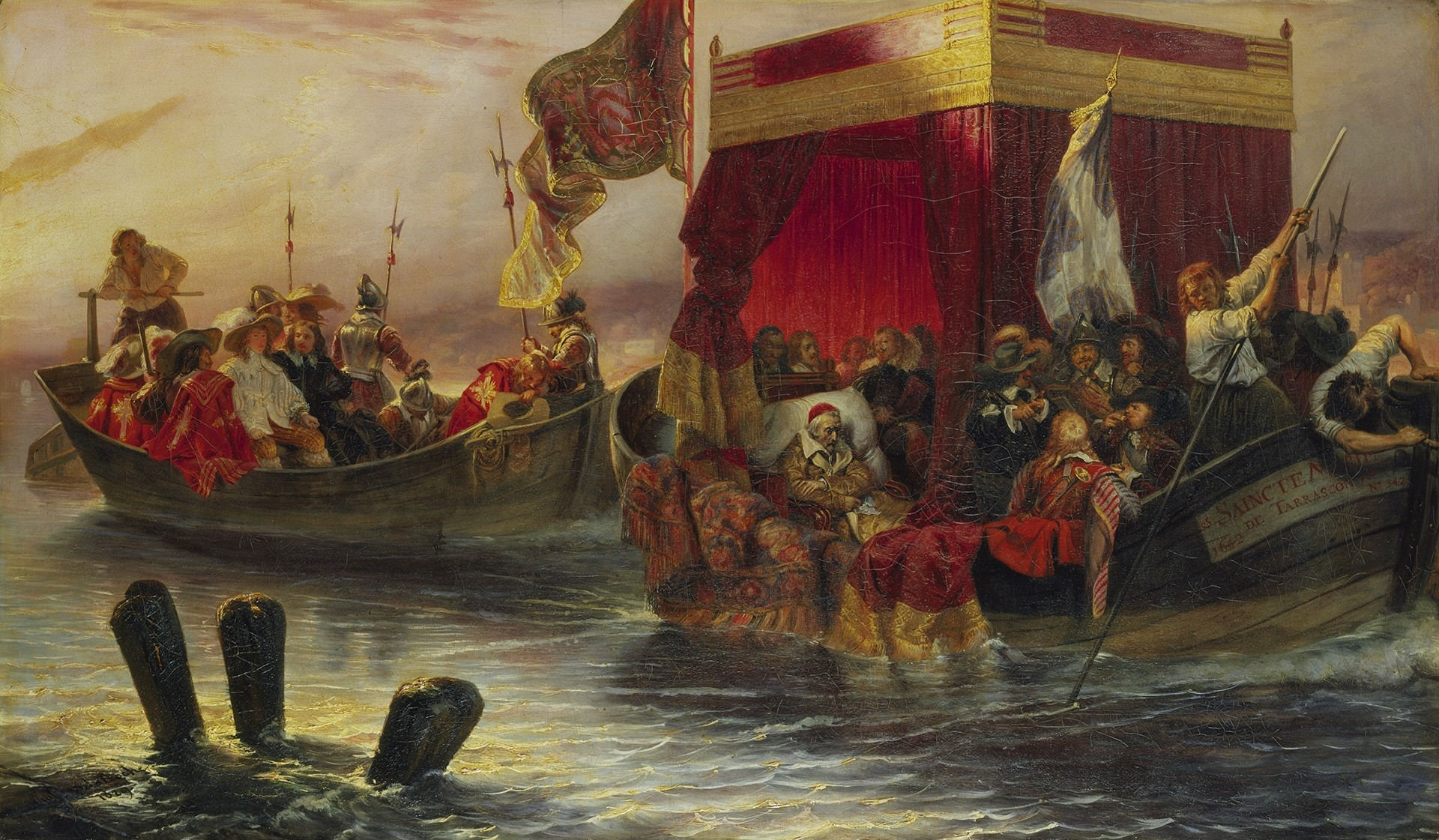
The State Barge of Cardinal Richelieu on the Rhône by Paul Delaroche, 1829

He was portrayed in the 1826 novel Cinq-Mars by Alfred de Vigny. A famous 19th century historical painting The State Barge of Cardinal Richelieu on the Rhône by Paul Delaroche shows Cardinal Richelieu in a gorgeous barge, preceding the boat carrying De Thou and Cinq-Mars to their execution.
