= Claudius Jacquand =

French painter (1803–1878)

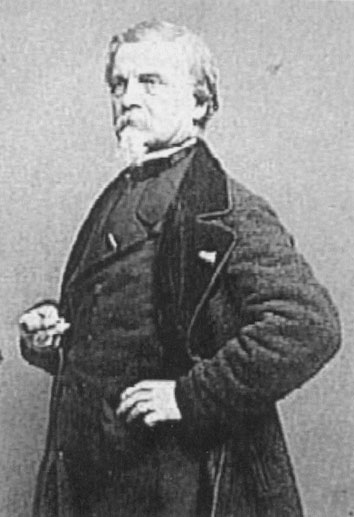
- Claudius Jacquand
- Born: Claude Jacquand; 11 December 1803; Lyon, France
- Died: 2 April 1878 (aged 74); Paris, France
- Known for: Painting
- Movement: Romanticism, Academic art

Signature
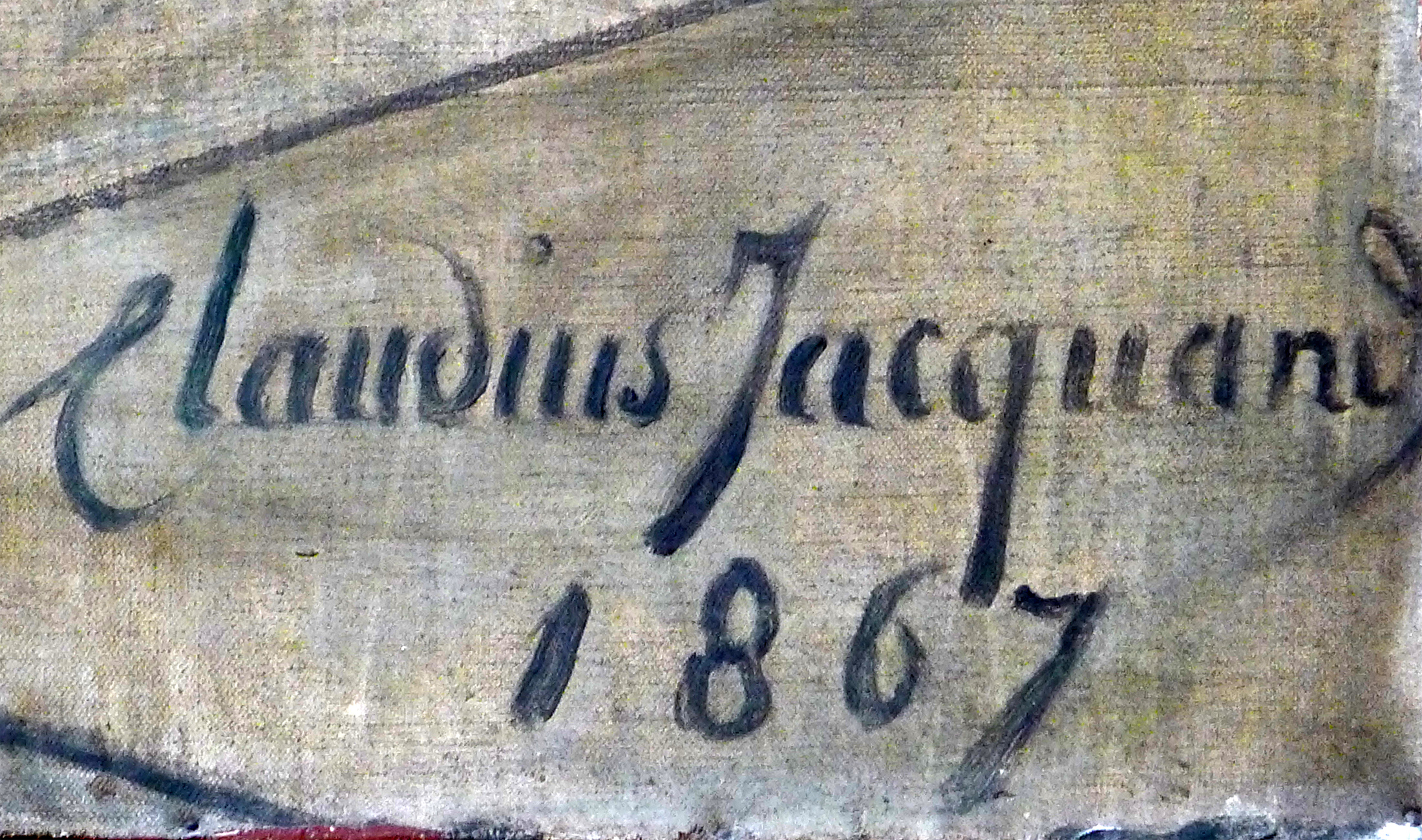

Claude Jacquand, known as Claudius Jacquand (French pronunciation: [klodjy(s) ʒakɑ̃]; 11 December 1803, Lyon – 2 April 1878, Paris) was a French painter of historical tableaus, genre scenes and religious subjects.

== Biography ==
He came from a family devoted to handicrafts and his father was a comb-maker. He had his first art lessons at the École nationale des beaux-arts de Lyon with Fleury François Richard. Following his mother's death in 1836, he moved to Paris and began exhibiting.

In 1839, he became a Knight in the Legion d'Honneur and, a year later, he was awarded the Gold Medal at an exposition in Brussels. The following year, at an exhibition in The Hague, he won another Gold Medal and was decorated with the Order of Leopold. His father died shortly after, leaving him several valuable properties that enabled him to marry the aristocratic Lydia de Forbin, daughter of Louis Nicolas Philippe Auguste de Forbin and widow of the Viscount Alexandre Paul de Pinelli. He taught painting to his son-in-law Auguste de Pinelli, who also became a well-known artist.

He and his family settled at her hometown of Émeringes, where he built a mansion inspired by a castle he had seen in Paris. He was chosen to be Mayor in 1844. A year later, he exhibited at the Salon, where Charles Baudelaire characterized him as a painter of the "twentieth quality".

After the French Revolution of 1848, his income began to shrink dramatically and he sought paid employment. An effort to obtain the post of Director at the Musée de l'Histoire de France at Versailles was not successful. He and Lydia moved to Boulogne-sur-Mer in 1852 and sold their properties in Émeringes to help maintain their life style. Nevertheless, in 1856, they were forced to seek less expensive quarters in Paris. Lydia died in 1863, amid worsening financial problems. He continued to exhibit regularly, earning barely enough to get by. He died in 1878.

== Selected paintings ==
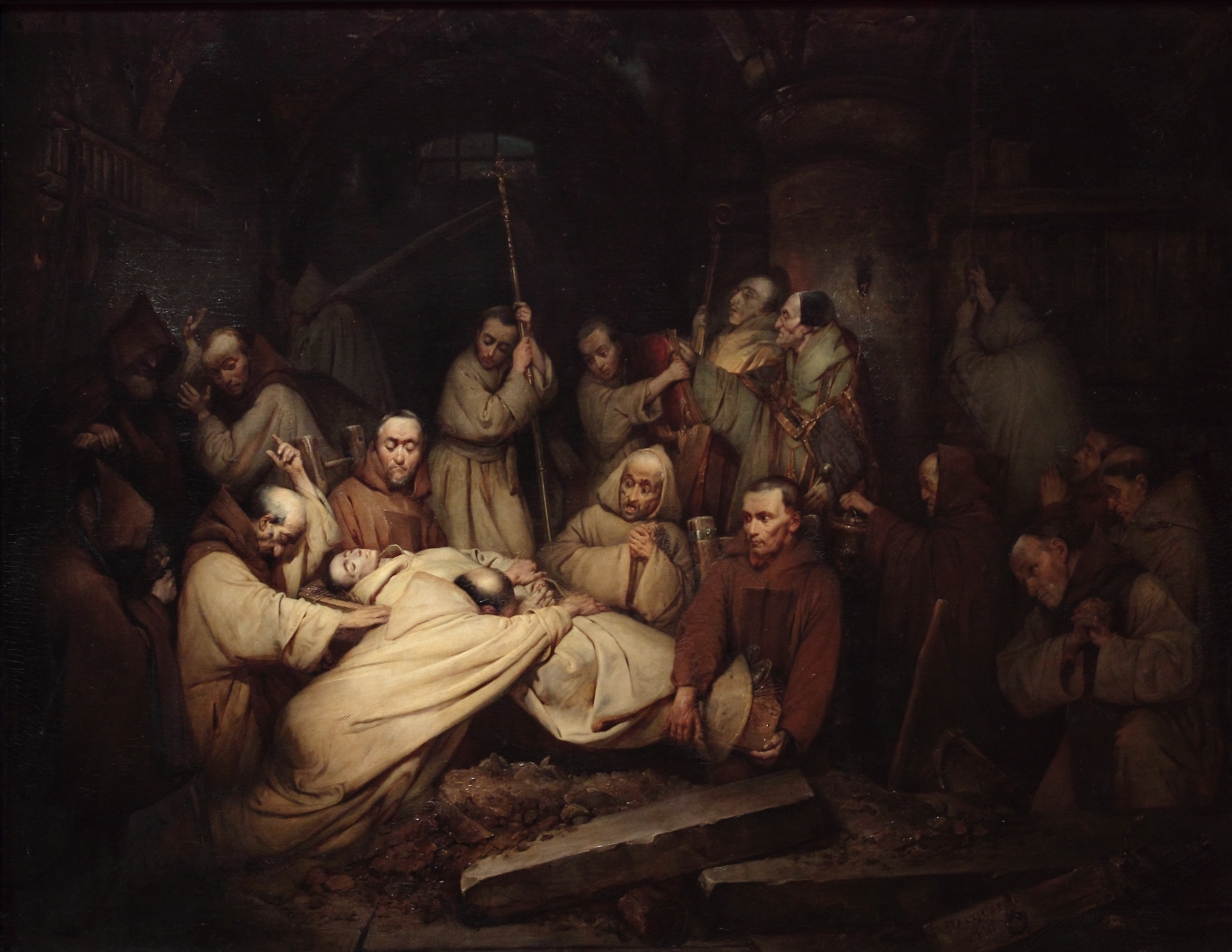
The Count of Comminges Recognizing Adélaide, a scene from a novel by Claudine Guérin de Tencin, 1836)

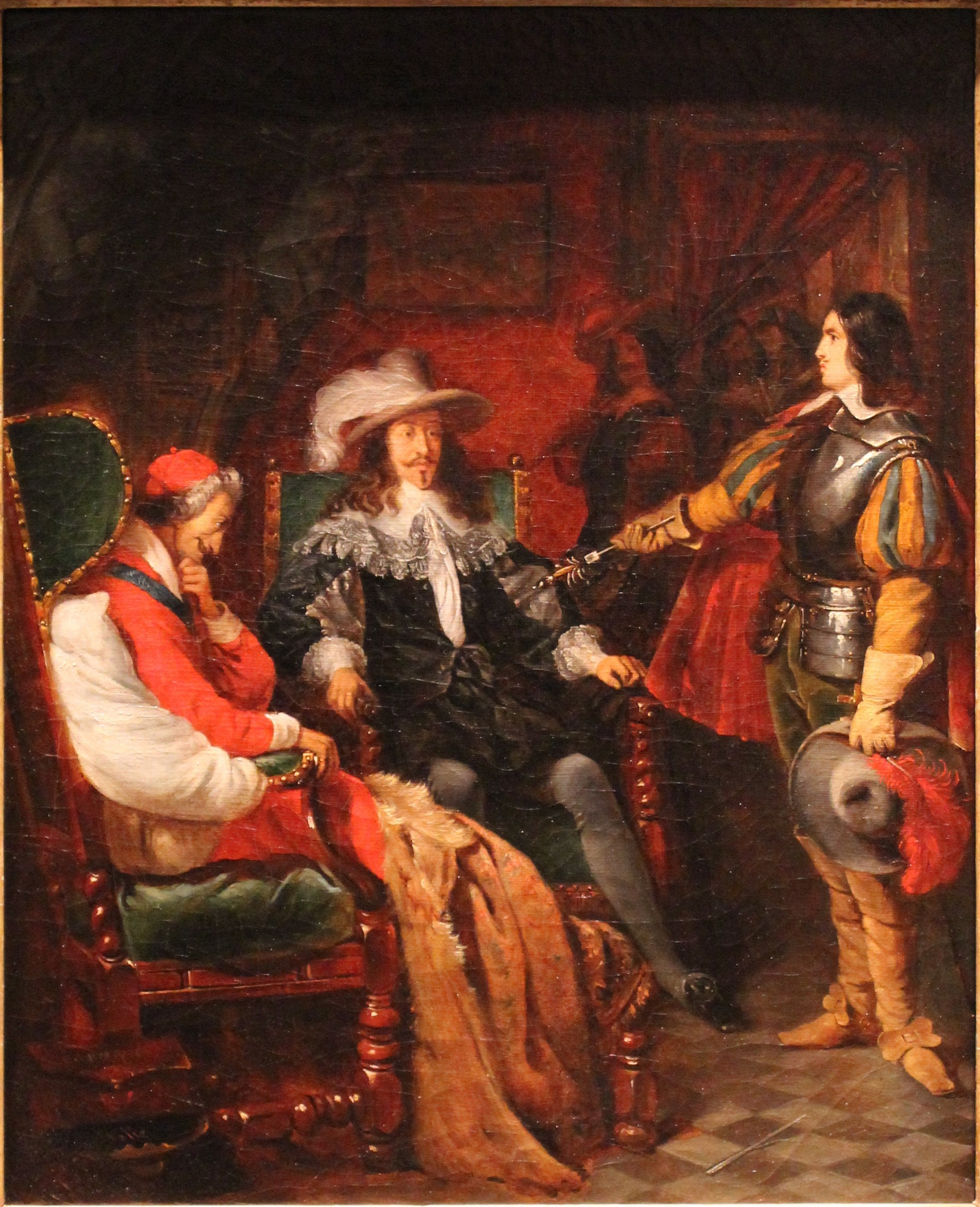
Cinq-Mars Surrendering his Épée to Louis XIII (1836–37)

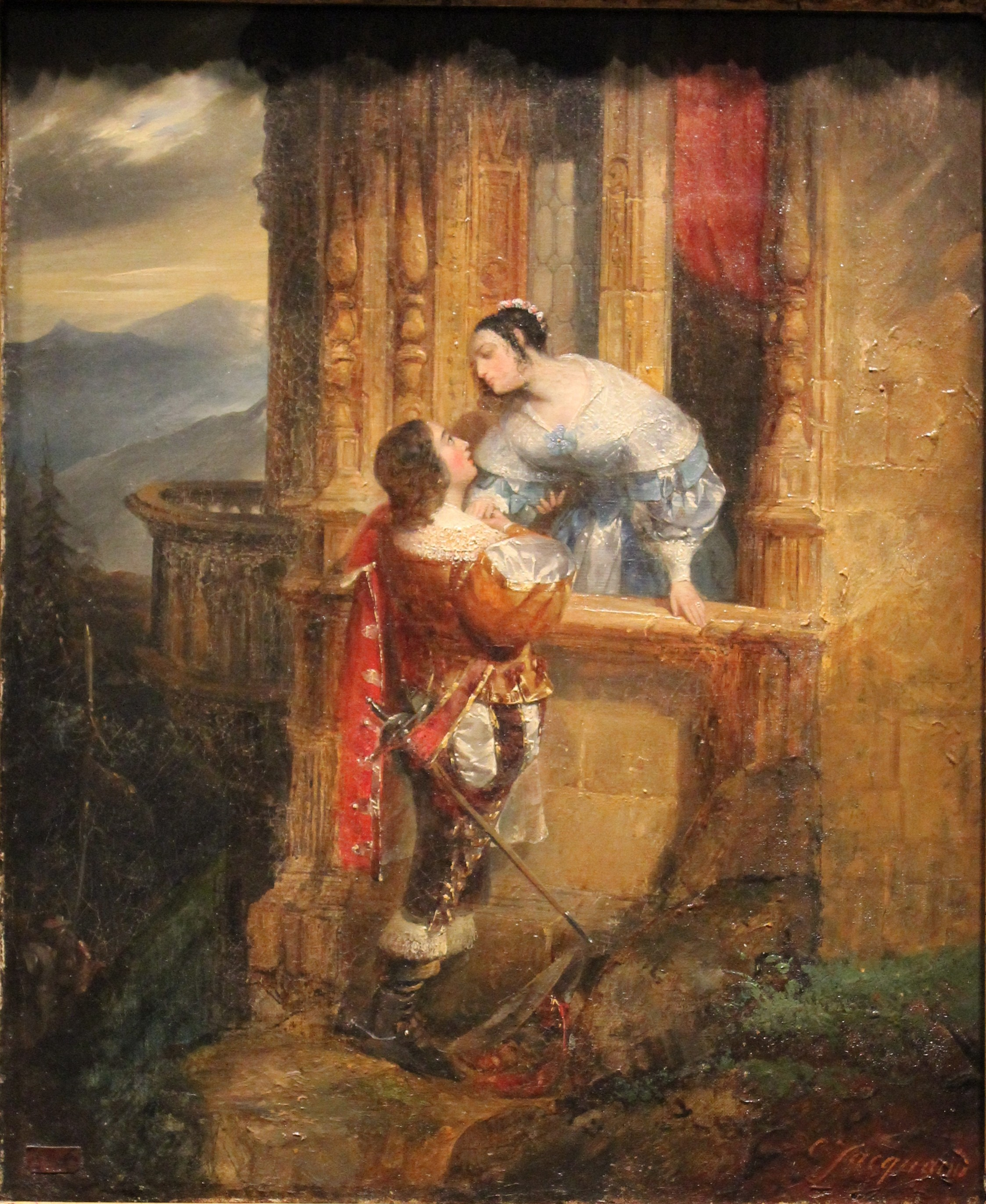
Cinq-Mars' Farewell to Marie d'Entraigues 1836

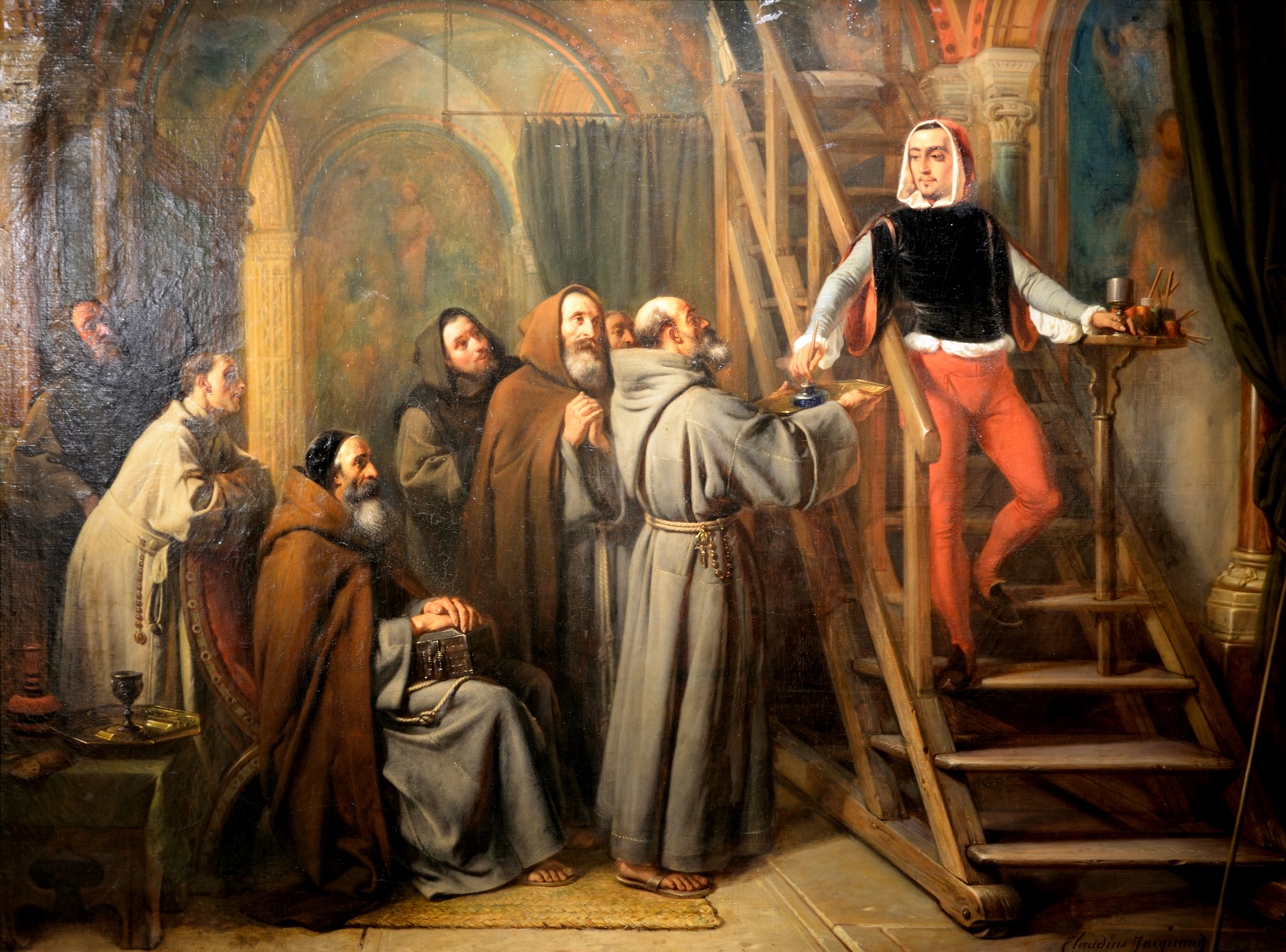
Pietro Perugino Painting for the Monks of Perugia (1857)

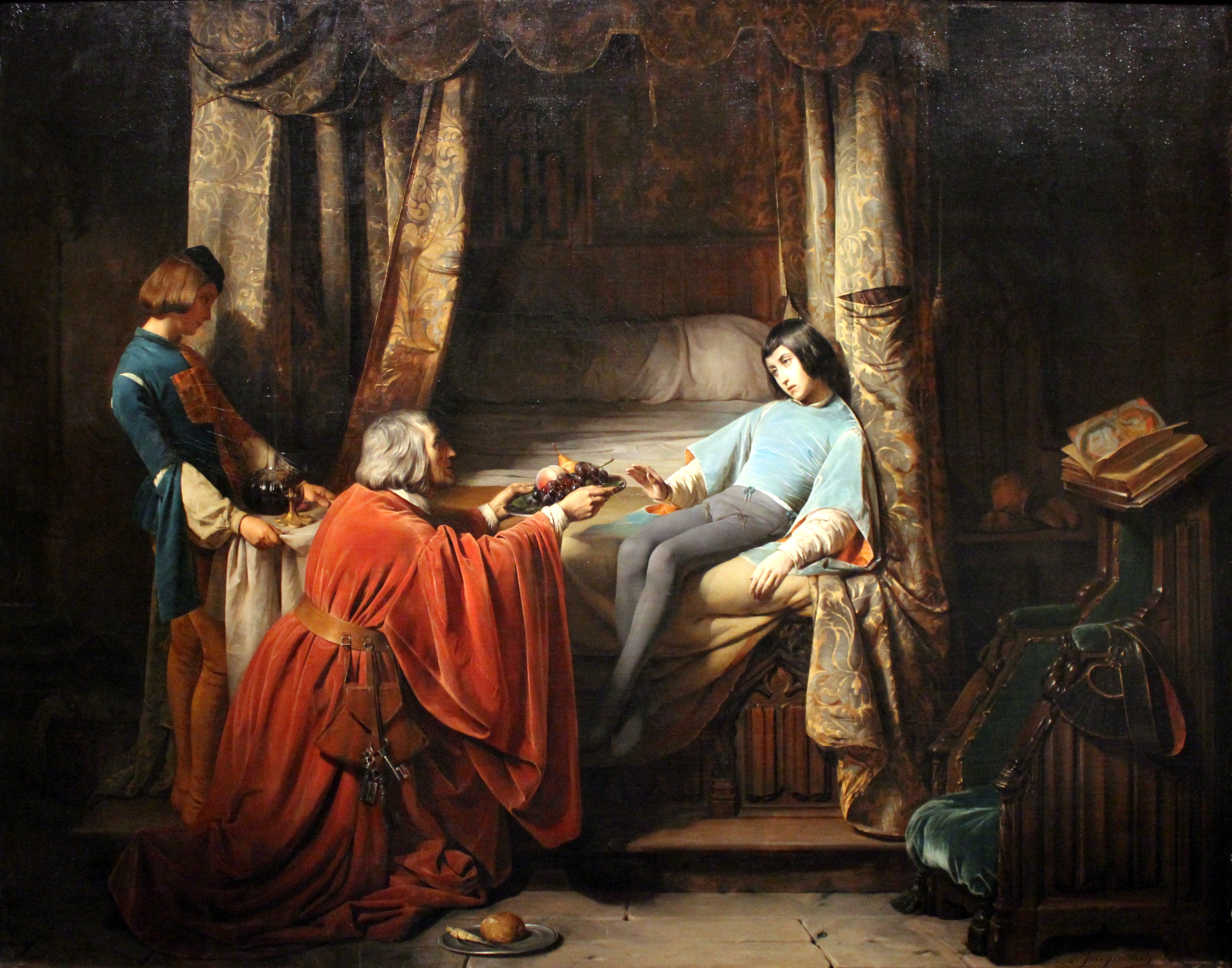
The Young Gaston, Called the Angel of Foix (1838)

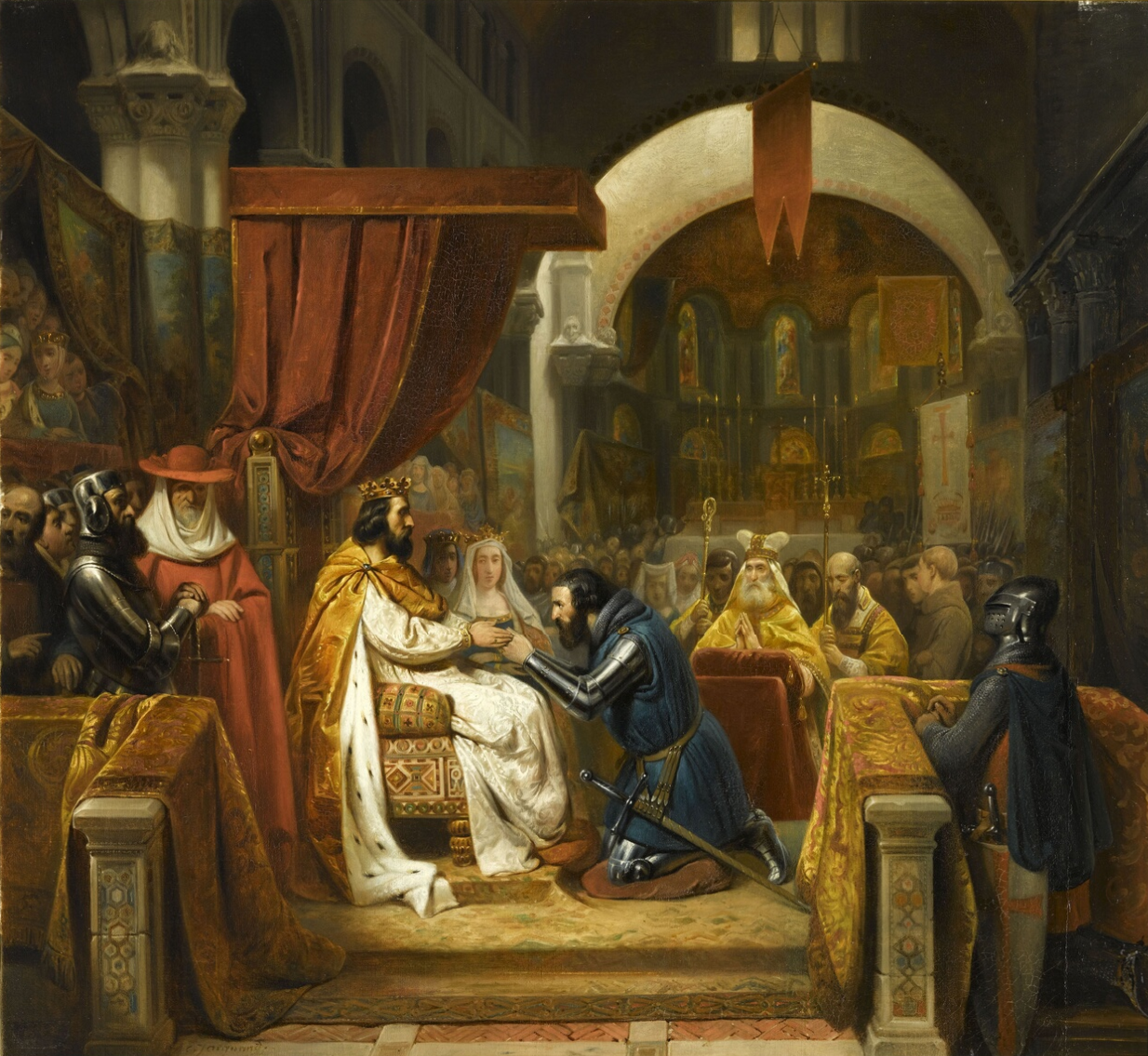
Henri de Bourgogne is invested the County of Portugal, 1094 (1841)

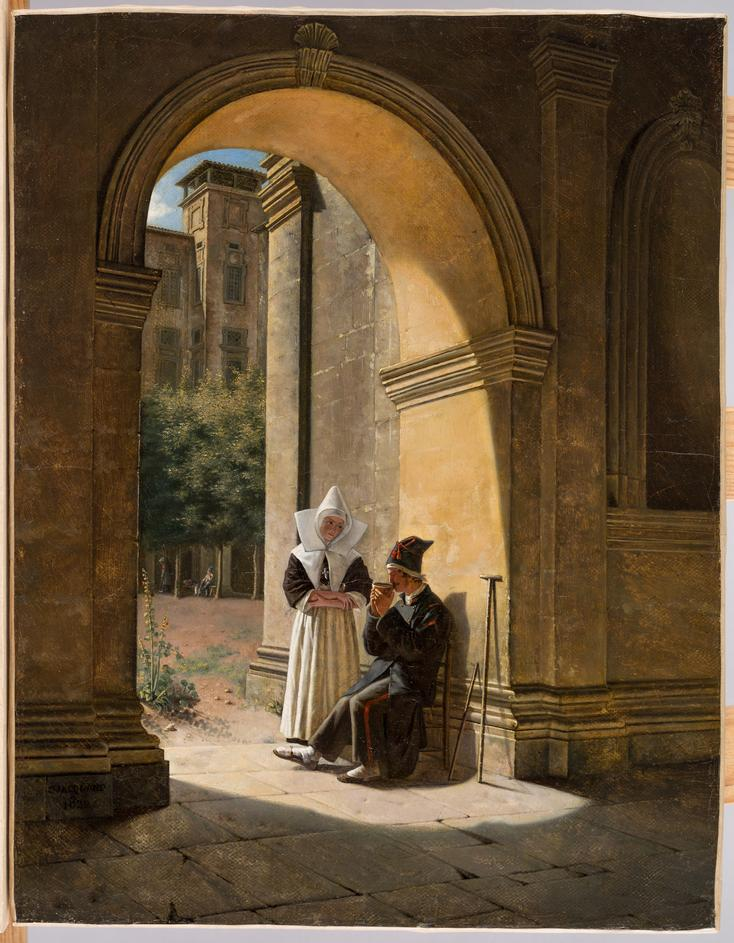
A nun cares for a soldier in a cloister (1822)
