= François Kinson =

Flemish painter (1770–1839)

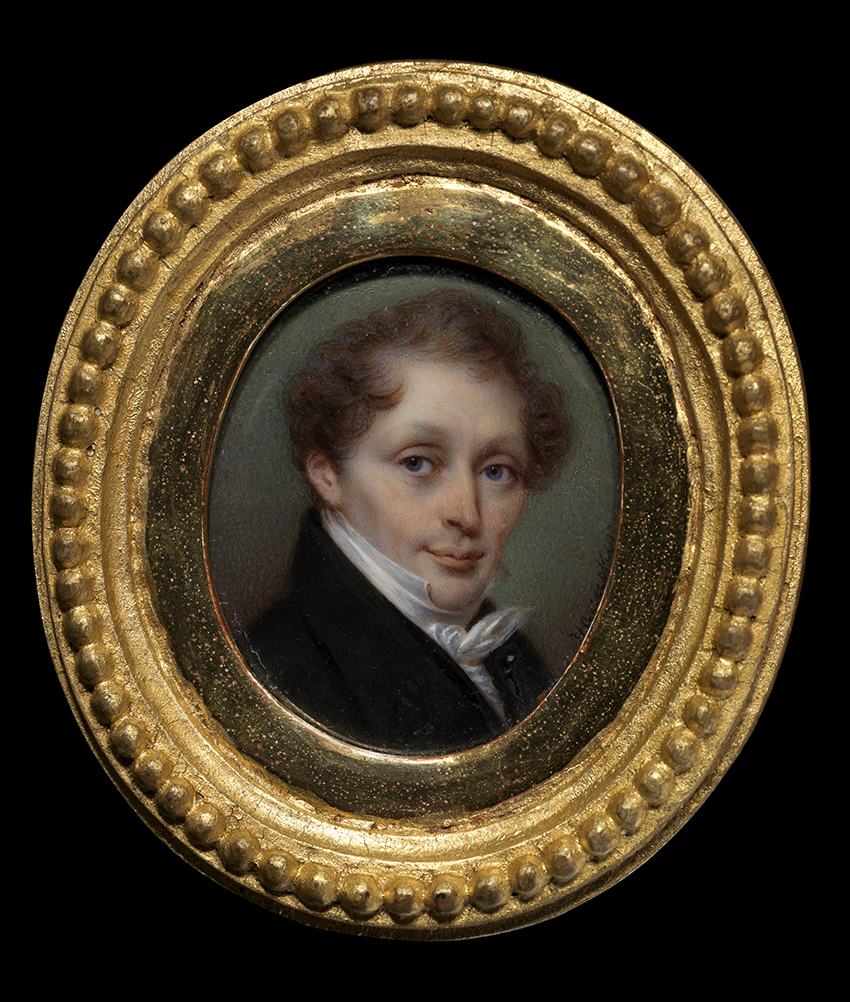
- Portrait of Franciscus Josephus Kinsoen, circa 1825 - circa 1830, collection Groeningemuseum
- Born: François Kinson; 29 January 1770; Bruges, Austrian Netherlands
- Died: 18 October 1839 (aged 69); Bruges, Kingdom of Belgium
- Education: Bruges Royal Academy of Fine Arts
- Occupation: Painter

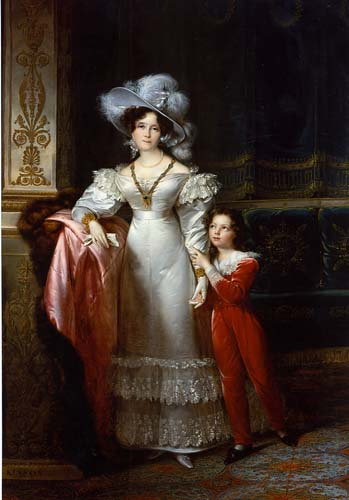
François Joseph Kinson, Comtesse de MacMahon and Her Grandson Jules Bessequier, c.1825-30

François-Joseph Kinson (Dutch: Franciscus Josephus Kinsoen) (29 January 1770 in Bruges - 18 October 1839 in Bruges), was a Belgian painter.

Kinson attended art school at Bruges and soon established a reputation in Ghent and Brussels. He exhibited a portrait in Paris in 1799. Settled in Paris from 1794 on, the artist courted the favor of the rich and famous of the time. He worked for Napoleon's court and eventually became court painter to Jérôme Bonaparte, King of Westphalia. Kinson is best remembered for his portraits of elegant women. The artist continued to work in Paris, but died unexpectedly during a visit he made to his sisters in Bruges in 1839, at the age of 68.

== Literature ==
- Charles CARTON, Ferdinand VANDEPUTTE e. a., Biographies des hommes remarquables de la Flandre occidentale, Brugge, 1847
- M. HEINS, François Kinsoen, in: Biographie nationale de Belgique, T. X, 1888–1889, 777-778.
- Henri PAUWELS, Groeningemuseum Brugge, Catalogus, Brugge, 1960.
- Om en rond het neoclassicisme in België, 1770-1830, tentoonstellingscatalogus, Brussel, 1986
- M.A. MEEUWS, Bijdrage tot de studie van het oeuvre van Frans Jozef Kinsoen, neoclassicistisch portretschilder, licentiaatsverhandeling (onuitgegeven), VUB, 1988.
- Lexicon van West-Vlaamse beeldende kunstenaars, Deel I, 1992.
- Dominiek DENDOOVEN, De Brugse academie in de achttiende eeuw, licentiaatsverhandeling (onuitgegeven), VUB, 1994.
- Martial GUEDRON, Suvée, Odevaere, Kinsoen et Ducq: quatre peintres brugeois à Paris au temps du néo-classicisme, in: Jaarboek Stedelijke Musea, Brugge, 1995–1996.
- Dominique VAUTIER, François-Joseph Kinsoen, in: The Dictionary of Art, Volume 18, Grove, Londen, 1996.
- Bénézit Dictionary of Artists, Vol 7, Gründ, Parijs, 2006
- Andries VAN DEN ABEELE, De Club van de Belgen in Parijs onder Napoleon, in: Le Livre et l’Estampe, 2008, blz. 117–153.
- Daniël DE CLERCK, Een late hulde aan François Joseph Kinsoen, in: Brugs Ommeland, 2009.
- Daniël DE CLERCK, Waar is het borstbeeld van Franciscus Kinsoen gebleven?, in: Brugs Ommeland, 2017.
- Daniël De Clerck, Ode aan de vrouw van Frans-Jozef Kinsoen, in: Brugs Ommeland, 2018.
- Daniël DE CLERCK, Frans Kinsoen in miniatuur?, in: Brugs Ommeland, 2018.
- Daniël DE CLERCK, Wie is dat mysterieuze 'Kinsoen-meisje' in de Brugse collectie?, in: Handelingen van het Genootschap voor geschiedenis te Brugge, 2018.
