= Cinq-Mars (novel) =

1826 novel

- Author: Alfred de Vigny
- Language: French
- Genre: Historical
- Publication date: 1826
- Publication place: France
- Media type: Print

Cinq-Mars is an 1826 historical novel by the French writer Alfred de Vigny. It portrays the rebellious conspiracy of Henri Coiffier de Ruzé, Marquis of Cinq-Mars during the reign of Louis XIII. Cinq-Mars unsuccessfully attempted to overthrow the Chief Minister Cardinal Richelieu and was executed. This and other early French historical novels A Chronicle of the Reign of Charles IX (1829) and The Hunchback of Notre-Dame (1831) were inspired by the popularity of British author Walter Scott's Waverley novels in France. It was de Vigny's only novel and also reflected the Gothic tone of the works of Ann Radcliffe.

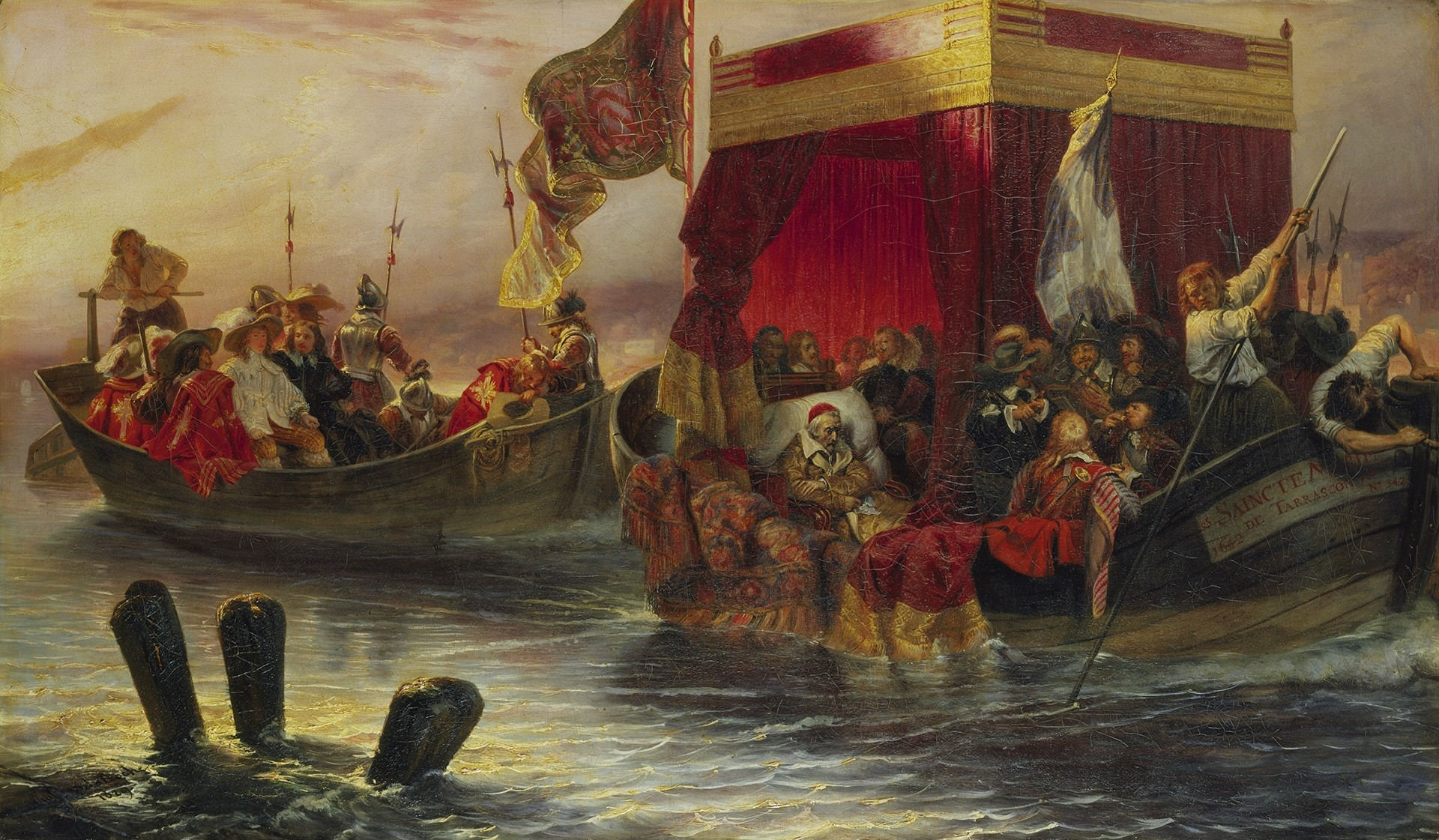
The State Barge of Cardinal Richelieu on the Rhône by Paul Delaroche, 1829

Several artists produced paintings based on the novel over the next few years including Claudius Jacquand and Paul Delaroche's who painted The State Barge of Cardinal Richelieu on the Rhône in 1829. The 1877 opera Cinq-Mars composed by Charles Gounod was also inspired by the novel.

== Bibliography ==
- Hamnett, Brian . The Historical Novel in Nineteenth-Century Europe: Representations of Reality in History and Fiction. OUP Oxford, 2011.
- Logan, Peter Melville, George, Olakunle, Hegeman, Susan & Kristal, Efraín (ed.) The Encyclopedia of the Novel. John Wiley & Sons, 2014.
- Potter, Caroline. French Music Since Berlioz. Routledge, 2017.
- Taylor, Karen L. The Facts on File Companion to the French Novel. Infobase Publishing, 2006.
