= Henri Coiffier de Ruzé, Marquis of Cinq-Mars =

Louis XIII's favourite

Henri Coiffier de Ruzé d'Effiat
- Marquis de Cinq-Mars
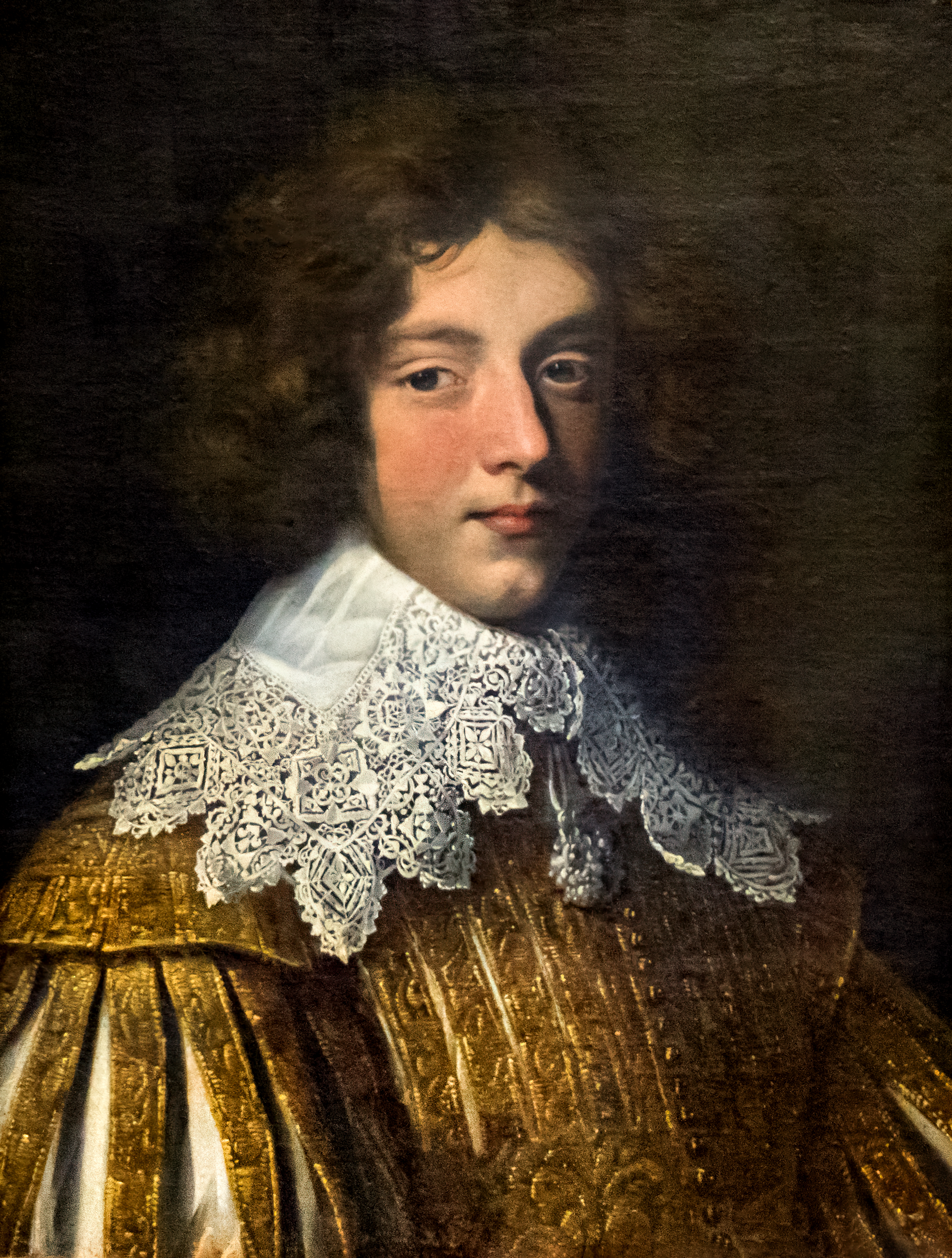
- Born: 27 March 1620
- Died: 12 September 1642 (aged 22); Lyon, France
- Noble family: Ruzé
- Father: Antoine Coiffier de Ruzé, marquis d'Effiat
- Mother: Marie de Fourcy

Henri Coiffier de Ruzé d'Effiat, Marquis of Cinq-Mars (French pronunciation: [ɑ̃ʁi kwafje də ʁyze]; 27 March 1620 – 12 September 1642) was a favourite of King Louis XIII and the Grand Squire of France from 1639 to 1642. He led the last and most nearly successful of many conspiracies against Cardinal Richelieu, the king's powerful first minister.

== Life ==
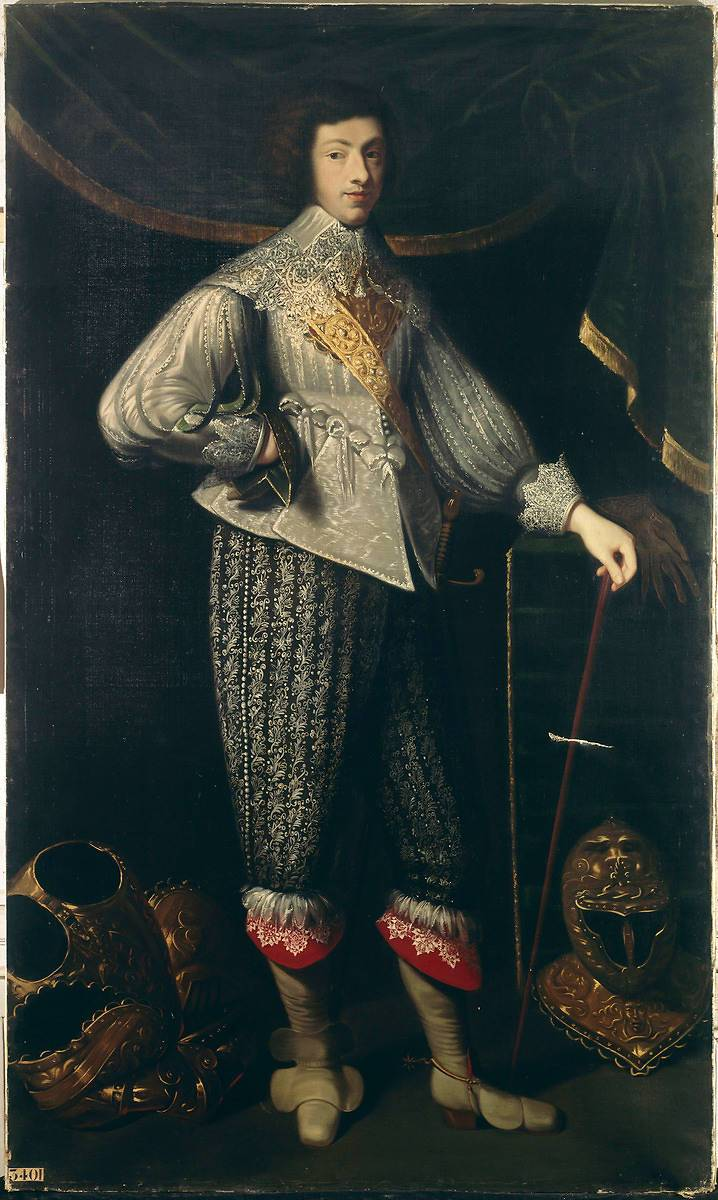
Portrait of Henri Coiffier-Ruzé d'Effiat by Joseph Léon de Lestang-Parade, after a 17th-century original attributed to Le Nain Brothers.

Cinq-Mars was the son of Marshal Antoine Coiffier de Ruzé, marquis d'Effiat (1581–1632), a close friend of Cardinal Richelieu, who took the boy under his protection on his father's death in 1632.

Cinq-Mars was the second youngest of five children and three sons. His older brother was Martin de Ruzé, Marquis d'Effiat (1612–1644), and his younger brother was Jean Ruzé d'Effiat (1622–1698). He was the uncle of the last marquis of Effiat.

=== Career ===
As the son of the marquis d'Effiat, a famous Superintendent of Finances who was also a good friend of Richelieu's, Cinq-Mars came to court very early.

In the 1630s, he commanded a company of Louis XIII's guards and, on 27 March 1638, he was granted the charter of Grand Master of the King's Wardrobe. In 1639, he was raised to Grand Squire of France, and was therefore entitled to be called Monsieur le Grand. After the exile of the royal favourite Marie de Hautefort, he gained great influence over the king and quickly established himself as a royal favourite. The cardinal believed he could easily control Cinq-Mars, but instead Cinq-Mars pressed the king for important favours and tried to convince the king to have Richelieu removed or executed. The cardinal offered him numerous responsibilities outside Paris, which the marquis refused. Their disagreement became public in 1639–1640.

=== Conspiracy ===
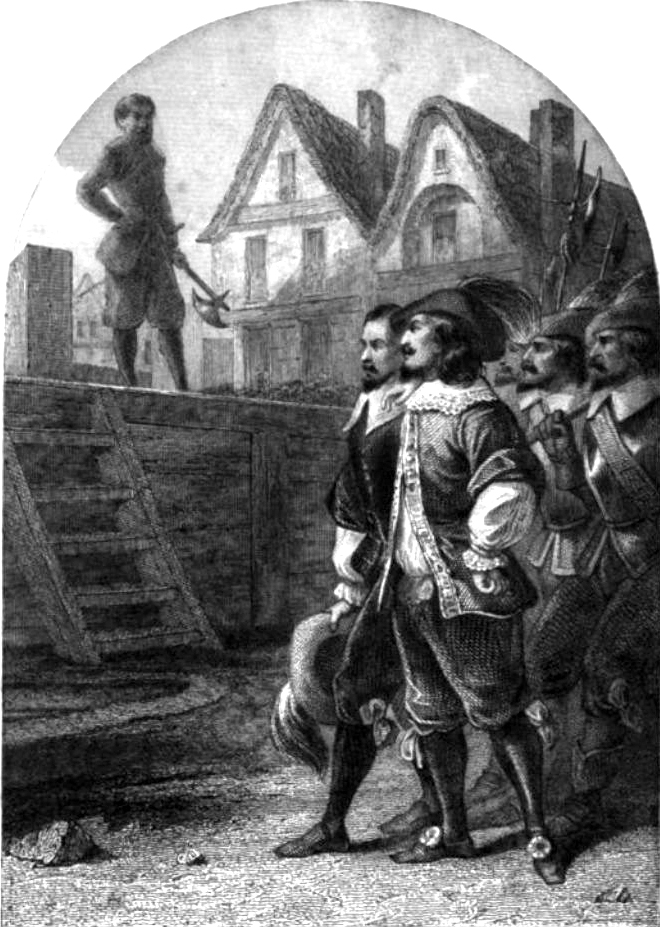
The Execution of Cinq-Mars and de Thou.

In 1641, Cinq-Mars was active in the Comte de Soissons' rebellion, but the effort failed. The next year, he conspired again with the king's brother, Gaston, Duke of Orleans, and with Spain, which had been at war with France since 1635. Their plan was to dismiss or assassinate Richelieu and sign a peace treaty with Spain that included the return of the strongholds conquered by France. The Spanish assembled an army of 18,000 men in the Sedan region to intervene on the side of the conspirators. The meetings lacked discretion and Richelieu's spy service caught him doing so in June 1642.

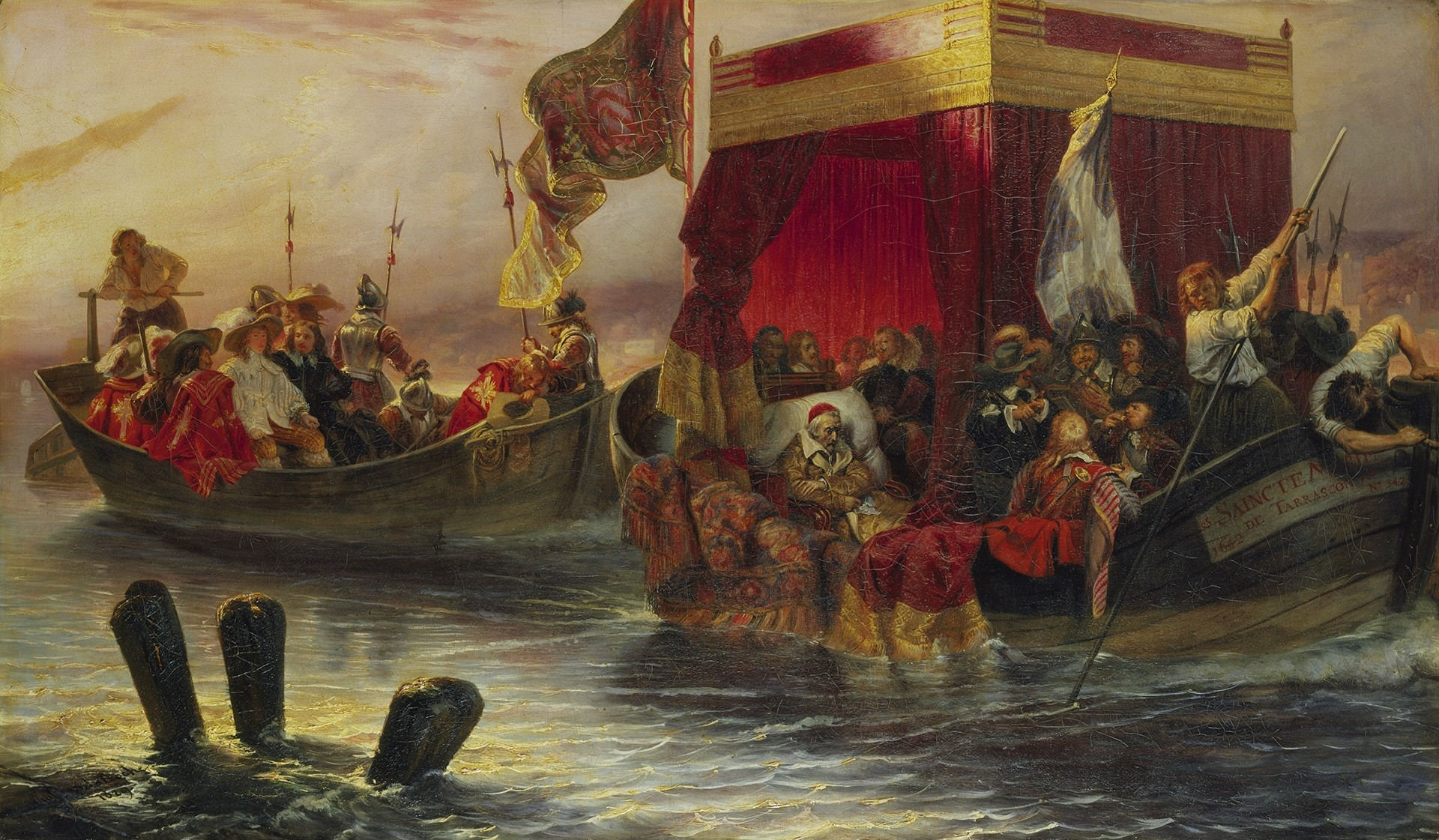
The State Barge of Cardinal Richelieu on the Rhône by Paul Delaroche, 1829

Consequently, Louis XIII and Richelieu had Cinq-Mars imprisoned and judged on 6 September 1642. Found guilty of high treason, Cinq-Mars was beheaded in the Place des Terreaux in Lyon, along with his accomplice, François Auguste de Thou, on 12 September 1642. The French writer, Tallemant, relates that the king showed no emotions concerning the execution: he said "Je voudrais bien voir la grimace qu'il fait à cette heure sur cet échafaud" ('I would like to see the grimace he is now making on this scaffold'). The marquis of Cinq-Mars' last words were, "Ah ! Mon Dieu, qu’est-ce de ce monde ?" ('My God! What is this world?').

== In popular culture ==
Alfred de Vigny wrote a novel Cinq-Mars, inspired by the story of the marquis, and published in 1826. Charles Gounod wrote an opera of the same name which premiered on April 5, 1877. Barbara Strozzi composed a cantata about the execution of the marquis ("Il lamento sul Rodano severo").

A famous historical painting by Paul Delaroche shows Cardinal Richelieu in a barge, preceding the boat carrying Cinq-Mars and De Thou to their execution.

Historical accounts are Jeanne-Pauline Basserie, La conjuration de Cinq-Mars (Paris, 1896) and Anaïs Bazin, Histoire de France sous Louis XIII (Paris).

== Footnotes ==
Preceded by Roger de Saint-Lary, Duke of Bellegarde	Grand Squire of France; 1639–1642	Succeeded by Henri, Count of Harcourt
