= Alfred de Vigny =

French poet, playwright, and novelist (1797–1863)

Alfred Victor, Comte de Vigny
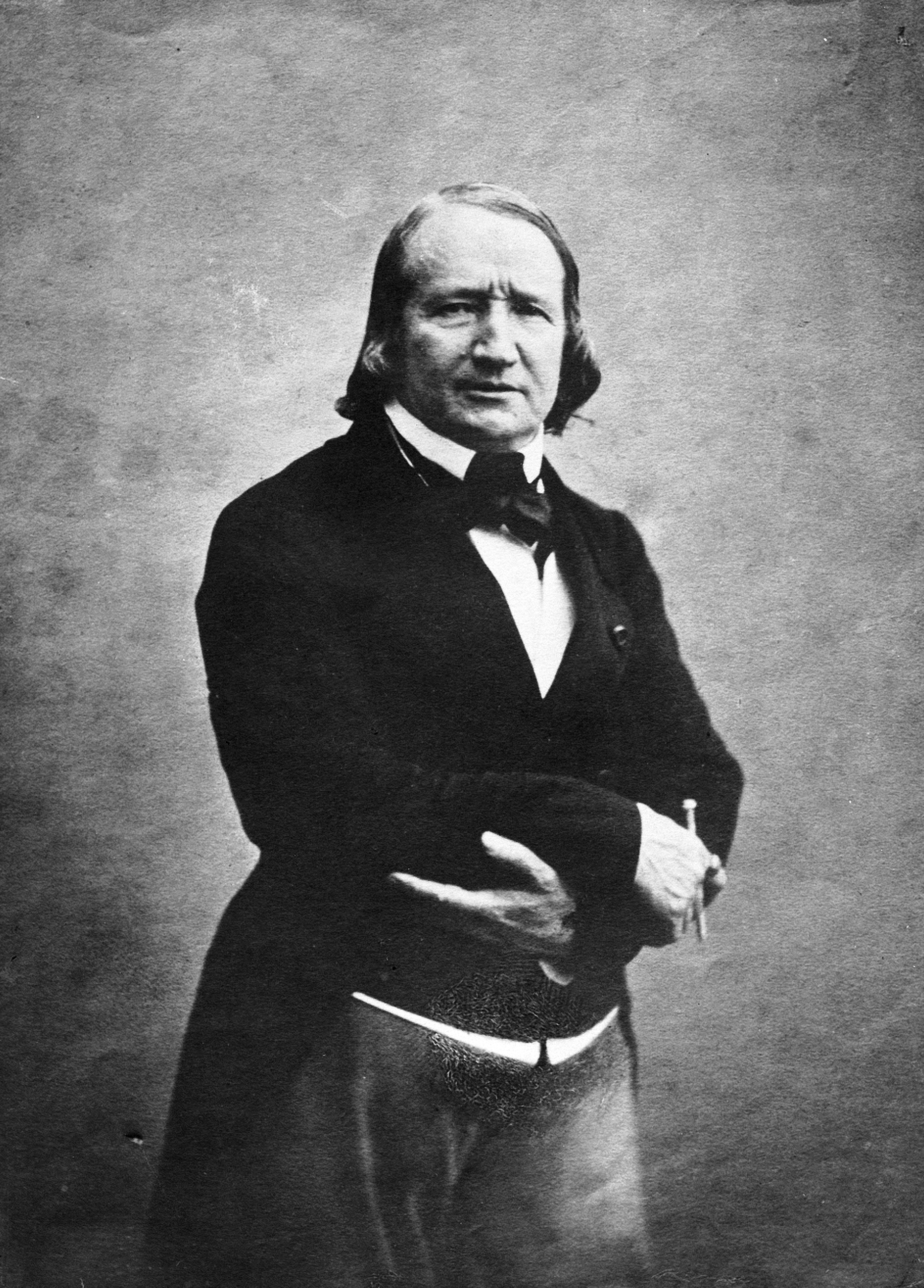
- Vigny, by Félix Nadar.
- Born: Alfred Victor, Comte de Vigny; 27 March 1797; Loches, France
- Died: 17 September 1863 (aged 66); Paris, France
- Occupations: Poet; translator; novelist
- Writing career
- Movement: Romanticism

Alfred Victor, Comte de Vigny (French pronunciation: [alfʁɛd viktɔʁ kɔ̃t də viɲi]; 27 March 1797 – 17 September 1863) was a French poet and an early French Romanticist. He also produced novels, plays, and translations of Shakespeare.

== Biography ==
Vigny was born in Loches (a town to which he never returned) to an aristocratic family. His father was a 60-year-old veteran of the Seven Years' War who died before Vigny's 20th birthday; his mother, 20 years younger, was a strong-willed woman who was inspired by Rousseau and took personal responsibility for Vigny's early education. His maternal grandfather, the Marquis de Baraudin, had served as commodore with the royal navy.

Vigny grew up in Paris, and attended preparatory studies for the École Polytechnique at the Lycée Bonaparte, obtaining a good knowledge of French history and the Bible before developing an "inordinate love for the glory of bearing arms".

As was the case for every noble family, the French Revolution diminished the family's circumstances considerably. After Napoléon's defeat at Waterloo, a Bourbon, Louis XVIII, the brother of Louis XVI, was restored to authority, and in 1814 Vigny enrolled in one of the privileged aristocratic companies of the Maison du Roi (king's guard) as a second lieutenant.

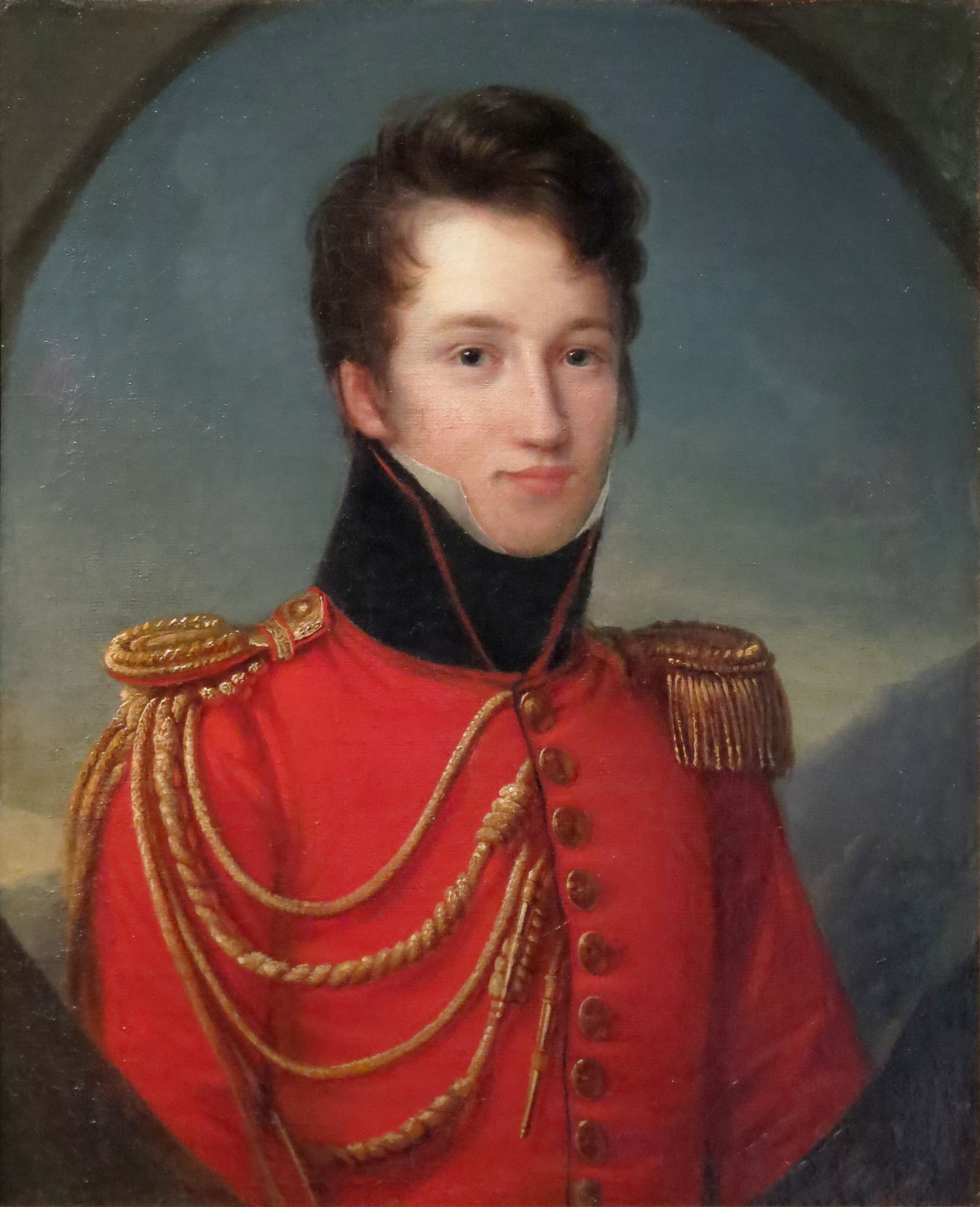
Portrait of Vigny, attributed to François Kinson

Though he was promoted to first lieutenant in 1822 and to captain the next year, the military profession in time of peace bored him. After taking several leaves of absence he abandoned military life during 1827, having already published his first poem Le Bal during 1820 and an ambitious narrative poem Éloa in 1824 on the popular romantic theme of the redemption of Satan.

Prolonging successive leaves from the army, he settled in Paris with his young English bride Lydia Bunbury, whom he married in Pau in 1825. He collected his recent works in January 1826 in Poèmes antiques et modernes. Three months later he published the first important historical novel in French, Cinq-Mars, based on the life of Louis XIII's favorite Henri Coiffier de Ruzé, Marquis of Cinq-Mars, who conspired against the Cardinal de Richelieu. With the success of these two volumes, Vigny seemed to be becoming a major Romantic celebrity, though one of Vigny's friends, Victor Hugo, soon became much more famous. Vigny wrote of Hugo: "The Victor I loved is no more... now he likes to make saucy remarks and is turning into a liberal, which does not suit him." Unlike Hugo and Alphonse de Lamartine, who became gradually liberal and then radical during the 1830s, Vigny remained pliantly centrist in his politics: he accepted the July Monarchy, at first welcomed and then rejected the Second French Republic, and then endorsed Napoleon III. Vigny later denounced people he knew well whom he suspected of republican sympathies to the imperial police.

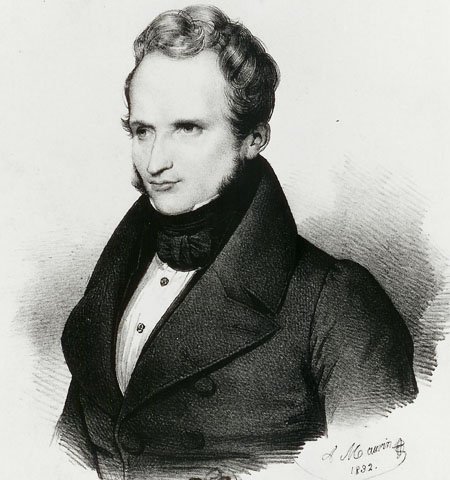
Alfred de Vigny, by Antoine Maurin, 1832.

The visit of an English theater troupe to Paris in 1827 revived French interest in Shakespeare. Vigny worked with Emile Deschamps on a translation of Romeo and Juliet. During 1831 he presented his first original play, La Maréchale d'Ancre, a historical drama recounting events just prior to the reign of King Louis XIII. Attending the theater, he met the actress Marie Dorval, who became his paramour until 1838. (Vigny's wife had become a near invalid and never learned to speak French fluently; they did not have any children, and Vigny was also disappointed when his father-in-law's remarriage deprived the couple of an anticipated inheritance.)

During 1835 Vigny produced a drama titled Chatterton, based on the life of Thomas Chatterton, an English poet who committed suicide while young, with Marie Dorval acting as Kitty Bell. Chatterton is considered to be one of the best of the French romantic dramas and is still performed regularly. The story of Chatterton had inspired one of the three episodes of Vigny's philosophical novel Stello (1832), in which he examined the relationship of poetry to society and concluded that the poet, doomed to be regarded with suspicion by people of every social order, must remain somewhat aloof from the social order. Servitude et grandeur militaires (1835) was a similar tripartite meditation on the condition of a soldier. It is discussed by characters in the novel, The Valley of Bones, by Anthony Powell.

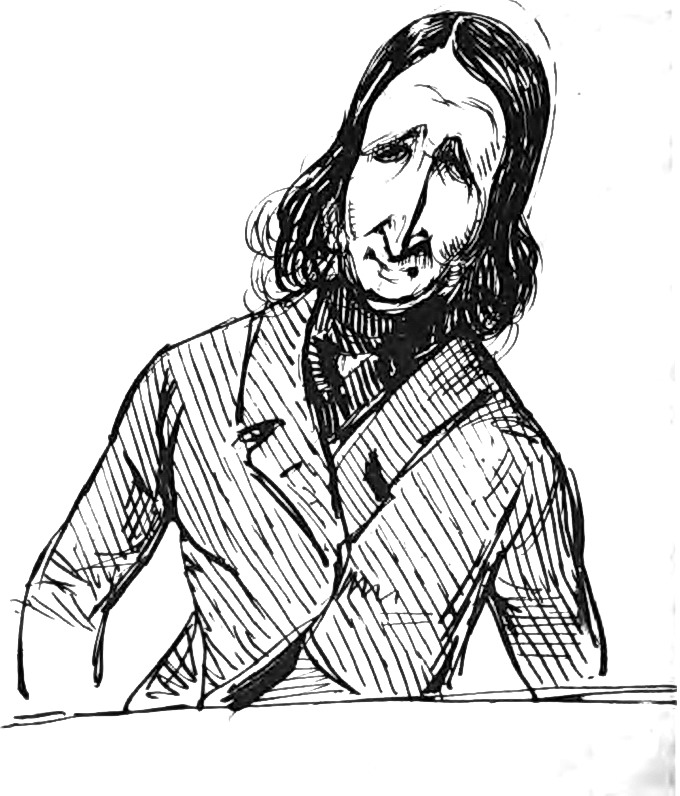
Sketch of Alfred de Vigny, by Prosper Mérimée.

Although Vigny gained success as a writer, his personal life was often unhappy. His marriage was a disappointment; his relationship with Marie Dorval was plagued by jealousy; and eventually even his literary fame was diminished by the achievements of others. After the death of his mother in 1838 he inherited the property of Maine-Giraud, near Angoulême, where it was said that he had withdrawn to his 'ivory tower' (an expression Sainte-Beuve coined with reference to Vigny). There Vigny wrote some of his most famous poems, including La Mort du loup and La Maison du berger. Proust regarded La Maison du berger as the greatest French poem of the 19th century. In 1845, after several unsuccessful attempts to be elected, Vigny became a member of the Académie française.

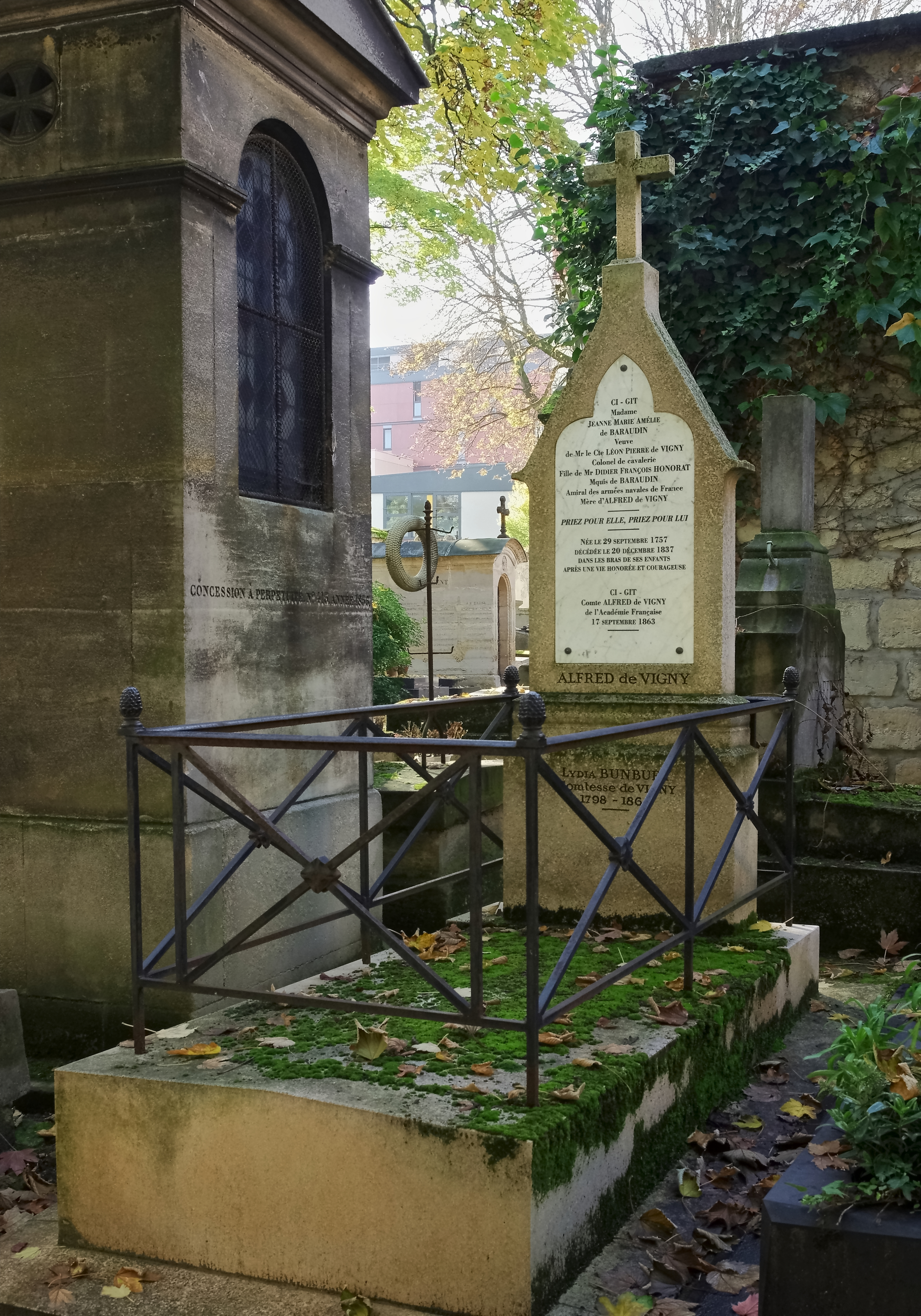
Tomb of Alfred de Vigny, his mother and his wife at Montmartre cemetery, Paris.

During later years, Vigny ceased to publish. He continued to write, however, and his Journal is considered by modern scholars to be a great work in its own right, though it awaits a definitive scholarly edition. Vigny considered himself a philosopher as well as a literary author; he was, for example, one of the first French writers to take a serious interest in Buddhism. His own philosophy of life was pessimistic and stoical, but valued human fraternity, the growth of knowledge, and mutual assistance. He was the first in literary history to use the word spleen in the sense of woe, grief, gall, descriptive of the condition of the soul of modern man. During his later years he spent much time preparing the posthumous collection of poems known now as Les Destinées, for which his intended title was Poèmes philosophiques. It concludes with Vigny's final message to humanity, L'Esprit pur.

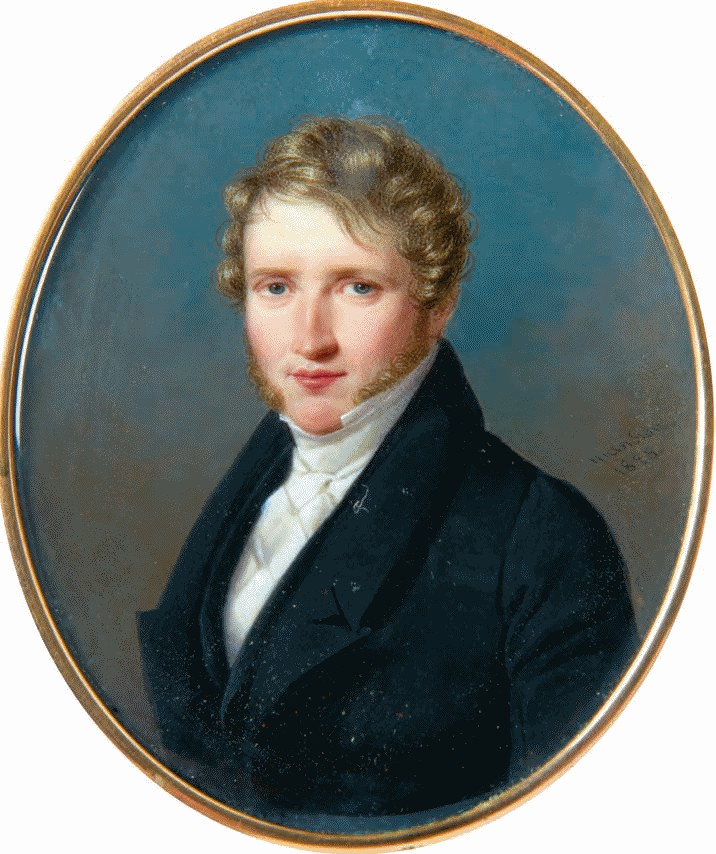
Alfred de Vigny in 1825, miniature by André-Léon Larue

Vigny developed what is believed to have been stomach cancer during his early sixties. He endured its torments with exemplary stoicism for several years: 'When we see what we were on Earth and what we leave behind/Only silence is great; everything else is weakness.' (A voir ce que l'on fut sur terre et ce qu'on laisse/Seul le silence est grand ; tout le reste est faiblesse.) Vigny died in Paris on 17 September 1863, a few months after the death of his wife. He was buried beside her in the Cimetière de Montmartre in Paris. Several of his works were published posthumously. In 1876, the composer Ruggero Leoncavallo wrote an opera CHATTERTON based upon Vigny's play and novel.

== Works ==
- Le Bal (1820).
- Poèmes (1822).
- Éloa, ou La Sœur des Anges (1824).
- Poèmes Antiques et Modernes (1826).
- Cinq-Mars (1826).
- Roméo et Juliette (1828, translation of Romeo and Juliet).
- Shylock (1828, adapted from the original by William Shakespeare).
- Le More de Venise (1829, translation of Othello).
- La Maréchale d'Ancre (1830).
- L'Almeh: Scènes du Désert (1831, unfinished).
- Stello (1832).
- Quitte pour la Peur (1833).
- Servitude et Grandeur Militaires (1835).
- Chatterton (1835).
- Daphné (1837, unfinished).
- Les Destinées (1864, illustrated by Nicolas Eekman in 1933.).
- Journal d'un Poète (1867).
- Œuvres Complètes (1883–1885).
