= Pseudotranslation =

Text falsely proposed to be translated from an original source

In literature, a pseudotranslation is a text written as if it had been translated from a foreign language.

== History ==
The practice of writing works which falsely claimed to be translations began in medieval chivalric romance. It was common in 16th-century Spain, where Amadís de Gaula and the numerous works descended from it benefited from the invention of printing to offer fantasies of travel, war, and love to wealthy young adults. The most successful of the Spanish works were quickly translated into all the major languages of Western Europe. Cervantes wrote the 1605 Don Quixote to finish them off because he believed that false history was socially harmful, as one of his characters explains in Chapter 49.

The concept of a pseudotranslation was reinvented by Israeli scholar Gideon Toury in Descriptive Translation Studies–and Beyond (1995). The technique allows authors to provide more insight into the culture of the work's setting by presupposing that the reader is unfamiliar with the work's cultural setting, opening the work to a wider world audience.

Writing a pseudotranslation involves using features that usually indicate to a reader that the text is a translation. As some translators have argued, pseudotranslations can be a way of publishing literature that is stylistically different or critical." Scholars such as Gideon Toury also note that readers are more likely to accept texts that differ from the norm if they are culturally distant.

The device of pseudotranslation was popular in early Soviet Union.

Some works of science fiction and fantasy are claimed to be translations from nonexistent languages. J. R. R. Tolkien's The Lord of the Rings explicitly claims to have been translated from the ancient languages of Middle-earth, while Gene Wolfe, in the afterword to its first volume, claims that The Book of the New Sun series is translated "from a language that has yet to achieve existence". In Warhammer 40,000, the Imperium of Man uses High Gothic and Low Gothic as its classical and lingua franca languages, respectively; however, though they are fictional languages that are stated to have experienced so much drift from their roots that they'd be unrecognizable to modern humans, pseudotranslation is used to represent High Gothic in the text as a hybrid of Latin, Greek and pseudo-Latin, and Low Gothic as Modern English with various words replaced with archaic, obscure or neologized ones as well as loanwords from High Gothic.

== Examples ==
- History of the Kings of Britain (c. 1136), by Geoffrey of Monmouth
- Don Quixote (1605), by Miguel de Cervantes
- Persian Letters (1721), by Montesquieu
- Cleveland (1731), by Abbé Prévost
- Candide (1759), by Voltaire
- The Works of Ossian (1765) by James Macpherson
- La Guzla, ou Choix de Poesies Illyriques recueillies dans la Dalmatie, la Croatie et l'Herzegowine (1827), by Prosper Mérimée
- Le Livre de Jade (1867), by Judith Gautier
- The Kasîdah of Hâjî Abdû El-Yezdî (1880), by Richard Francis Burton
- The Songs of Bilitis (1894), by Piere Louÿs
- I, Claudius (1934) and Claudius the God (1935) by Robert Graves
- The Lord of the Rings (1954-1955), by J. R. R. Tolkien, claimed original text being Red Book of Westmarch.
- The Man Who Counted (1938), by Júlio César de Mello e Souza
- La Fille d’un héros de l’Union soviétique (1990), by Andreï Makine
- The Beijing of Possibilities (2009), by Jonathan Tel
- I Am China (2014), by Xiaolu Guo
- Always Coming Home (1985), by Ursula K. Le Guin
- Saracen Island: The Poetry of Andreas Karavis (2000), by David Solway
- Warhammer 40,000 (1987), by Games Workshop

== Further reading (most recent first) ==
- Kupsch-Losereit, Sigrid (2014) "Pseudotranslations in 18th century France". In: Transfiction. Research into the realities of translation fiction. Eds. Klaus Kaindl/ Karlheinz Spitzl. Amsterdam: Benjamins, pp. 189–202.
- Gürçağlar, Şehnaz Tahir. (2010). "Scouting the Borders of Translation: Pseudotranslation, Concealed Translations and Authorship in Twentieth-Century Turkey," Translation Studies, Vol. 3, No. 2, pp. 172–187.
- McCall, Ian. (2006). "Translating the Pseudotranslated: Andreï Makine's La Fille d'un héros de l'Union soviétique," Forum for Modern Language Studies, Vol. 42, No. 3, pp. 287–297.
- Rambelli, Paolo. (2006) "Pseudotranslations, Authorship and Novelists in Eighteenth-Century Italy." In Translating Others. Ed. Theo Hermans. Manchester, UK: St. Jerome Publishing, pp. 181–193.
- Nelson, William (1973). Fact or Fiction. The Dilemma of the Renaissance Storyteller. Cambridge, Massachusetts: Harvard University Press. ISBN 978-0-674-29065-5.
