= Simon Jacques Rochard =

French painter (1788–1872)

Simon Jacques Rochard (28 December 1788 – 10 June 1872) was a painter of portrait miniatures in France, England and Brussels in the first half of the nineteenth century.

He was born in Paris to René Rochard and Marie Madeleine Talon. He showed early talent and, after his father died, helped support his mother and eleven siblings by drawing portraits. Rochard studied under Étienne Aubry and at the École des Beaux-Arts. He also studied miniature-painting from Emilie Bounieu (daughter of Michel Honoré Bounieu). At only twenty he painted a portrait of the Empress Joséphine for Napoleon and later other portraits of the imperial family.

After Napoleon's return from Elba in 1815, he was drafted into the army but deserted and went to Brussels. There he received commissions to paint miniatures including at least one of the Duke of Wellington leader of the forces opposing Napoleon. Shortly after he moved to London and became very popular, painting numerous miniatures of members of the upper class such as Princess Charlotte. He exhibited mostly at the Royal Academy of Arts from 1816 to 1845.

In 1846, he moved to Brussels where he exhibited at the Salon there until 1869. He also exhibited at the Salon of 1852 and the International Exposition of 1867 in Paris. He died in 1872.

== Marriage and family ==
His first marriage to Henriette Petitjean ended in a separation but left Rochard with a daughter, Eugenie, born in 1814, who married an English officer. At the age of 80 (circa 1868) he married Henriette Pilton, by whom he had one son. (However his son, Jean Simon Rochard, was apparently born before 1856.)

His younger brother, François Theodore Rochard (1798–1857), joined him in London around 1820. He was also a popular portrait painter specializing in miniatures and in water colors and won two silver medals from the new Society of British Artists in 1823. He retired after his marriage in 1850 and died on 31 October 1857 in London.

== Gallery of Rochard Paintings ==
Most of these are miniatures.

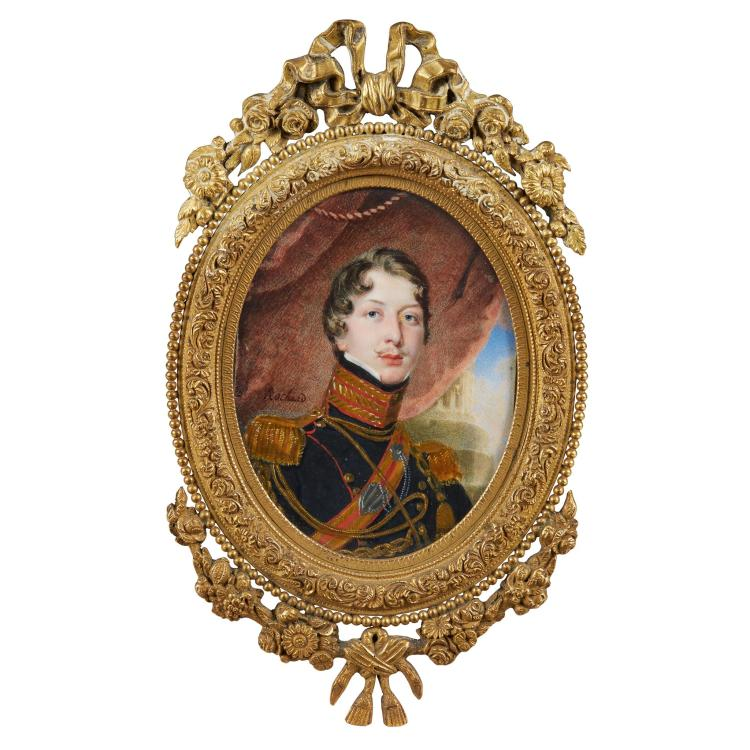
Augustus Frederick d'Este

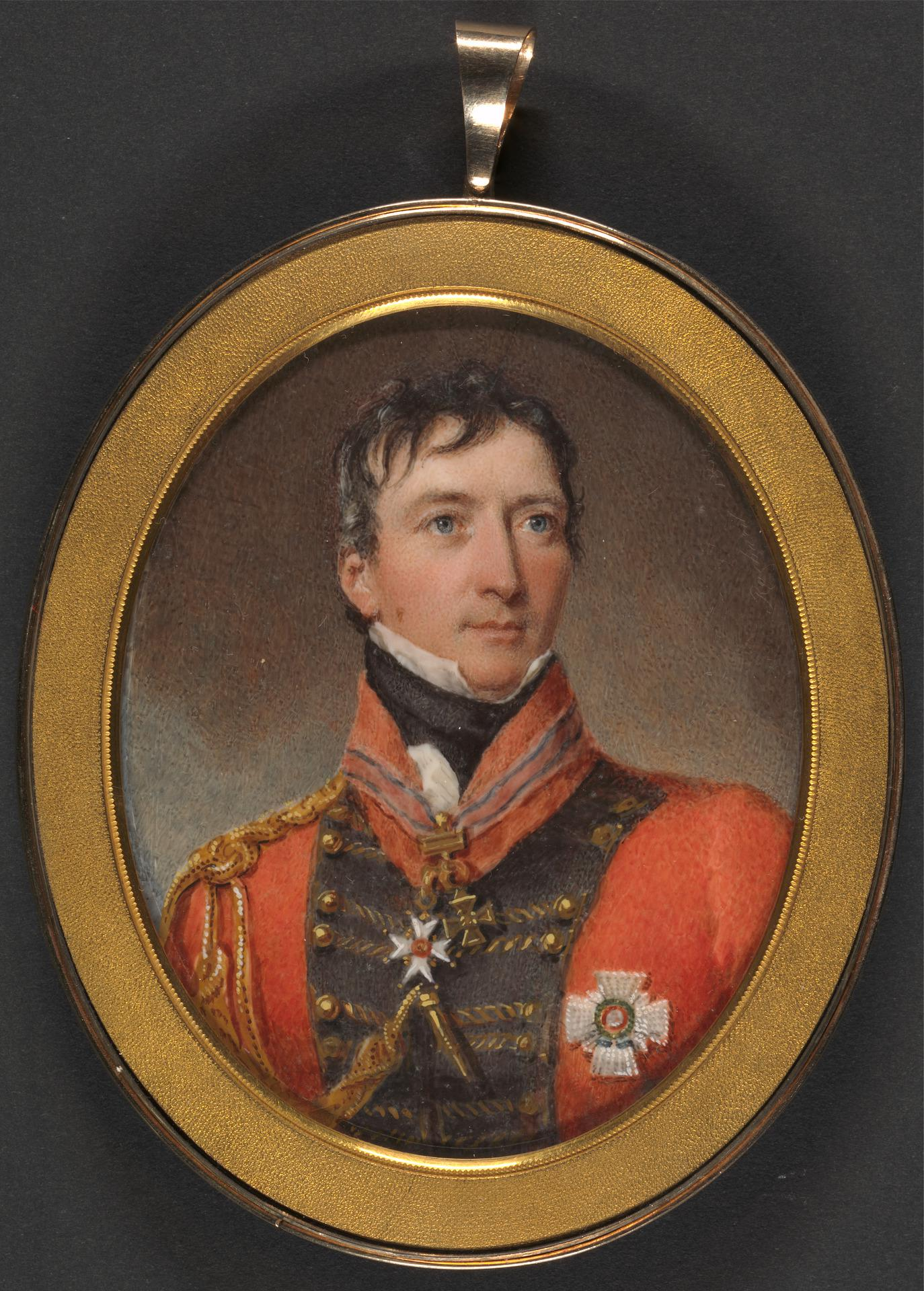
Thomas Brisbane (painted 1819)

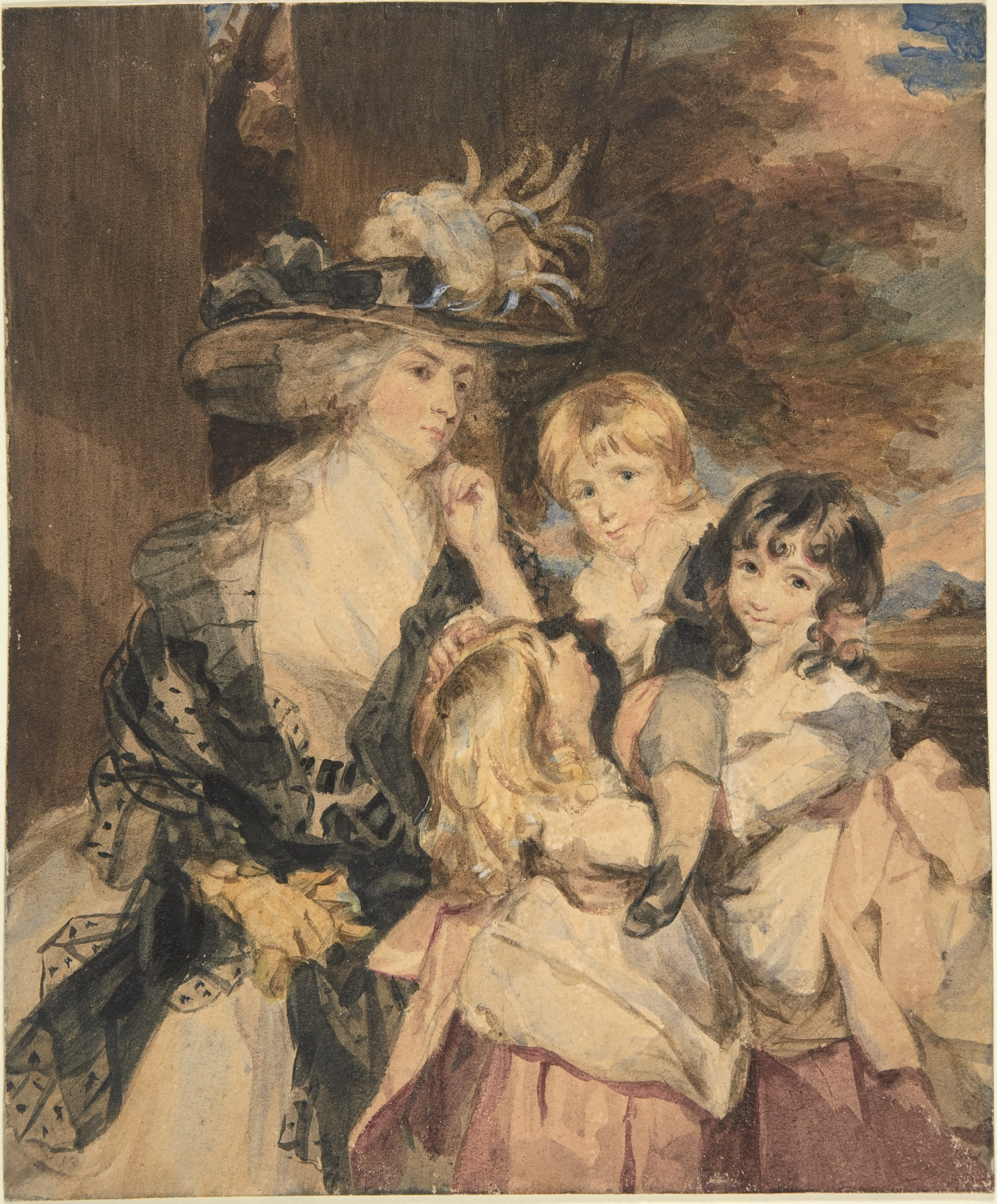
Lady Smith and her children (painted ?1824)

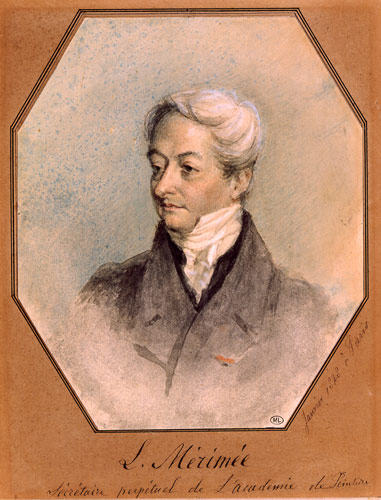
Léonor Mérimée (painted 1828)

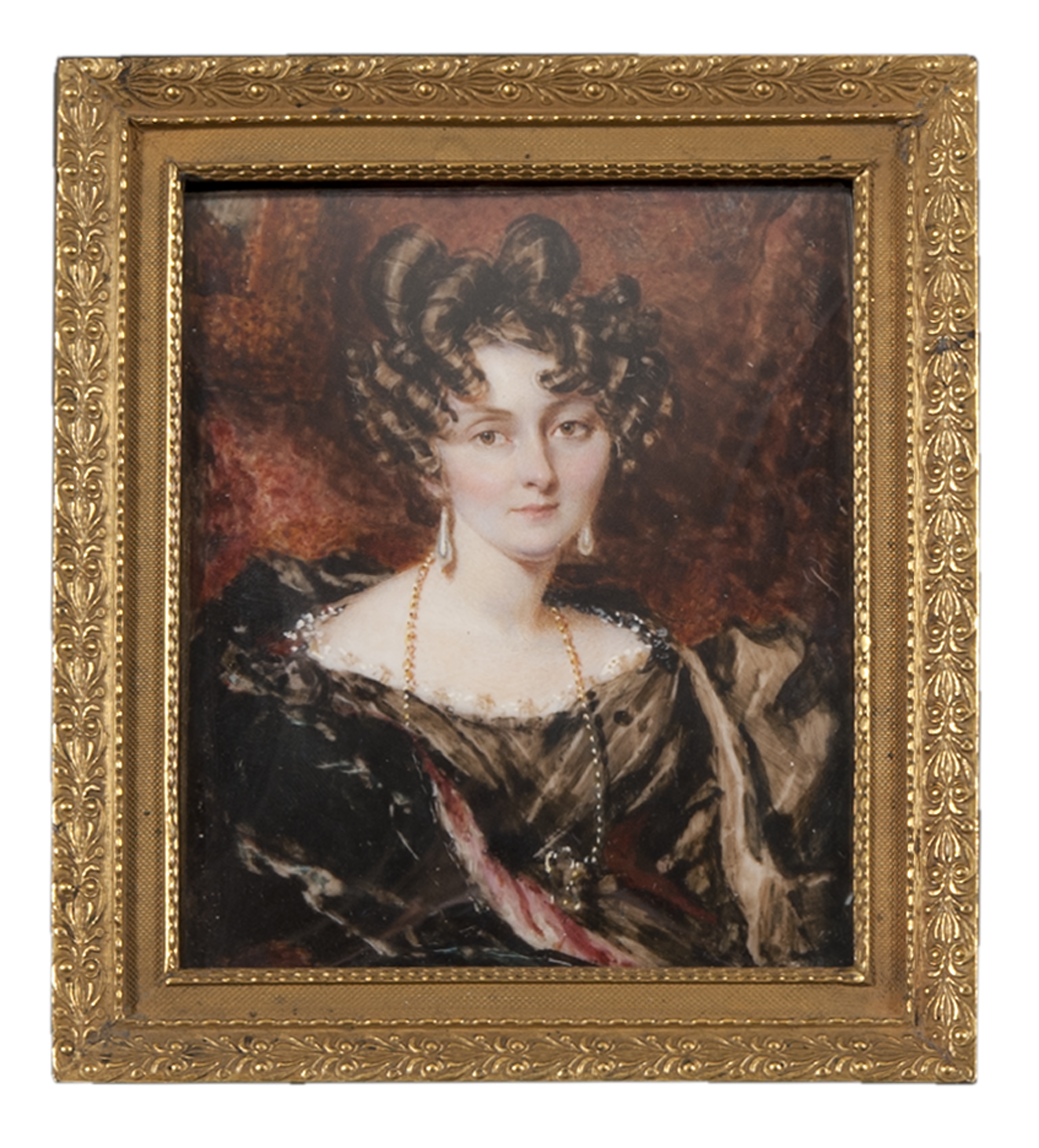
Harriet Ann Rooke, wife of John Kingston (painted circa 1830)

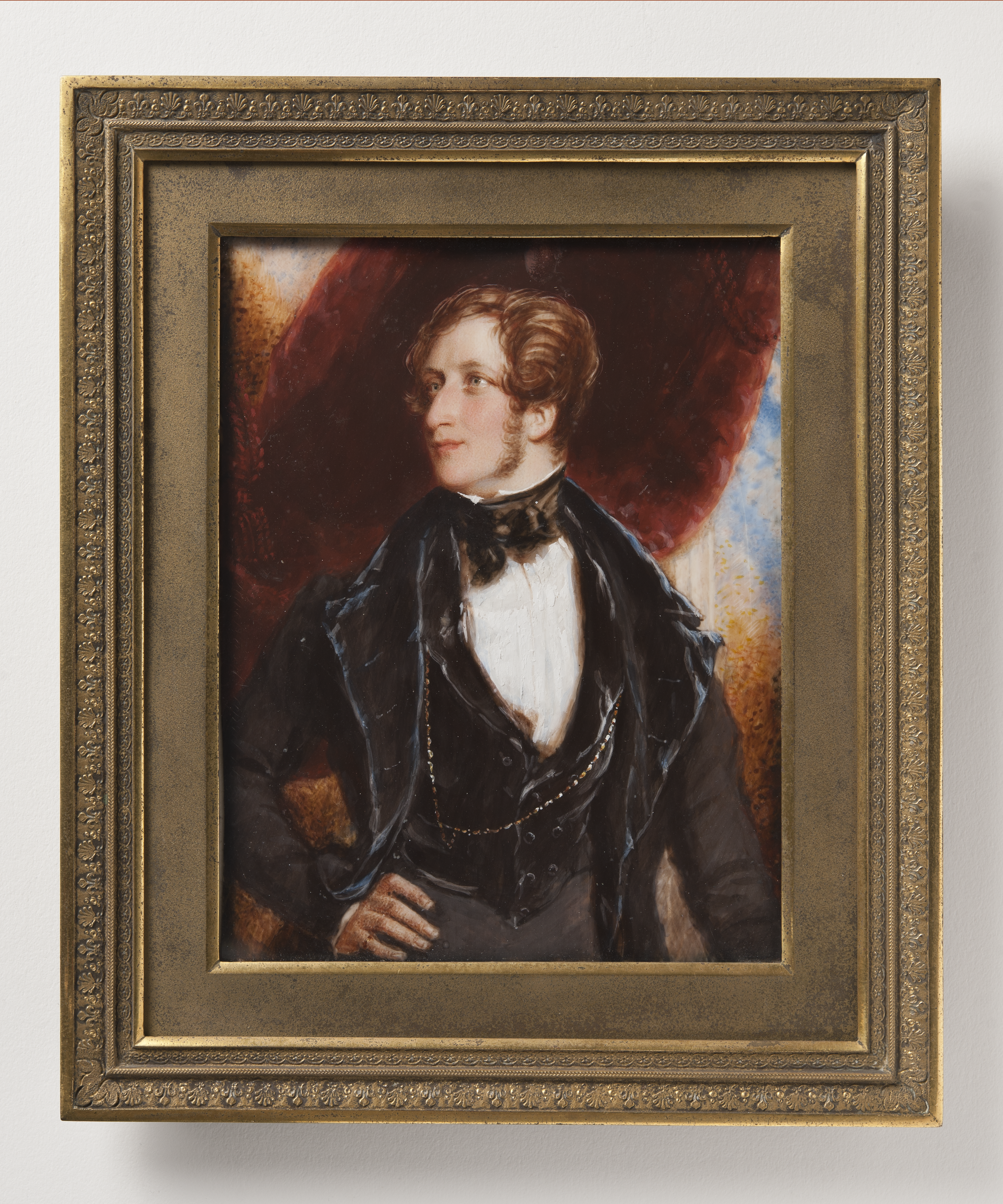
Frederick Stewart, 4th Marquess of Londonderry (painted 1833)

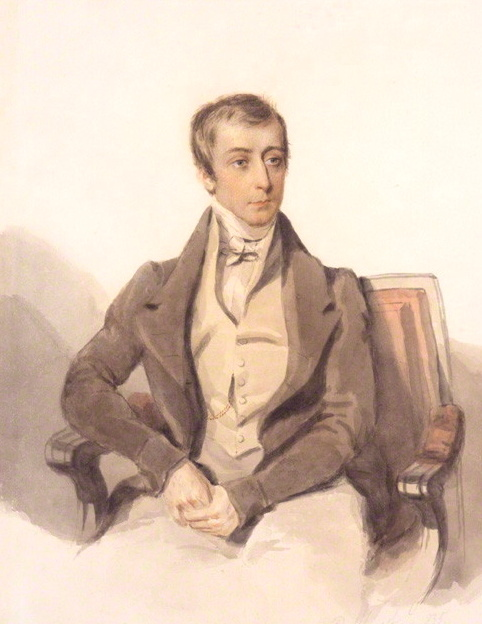
George Eden (painted 1835)

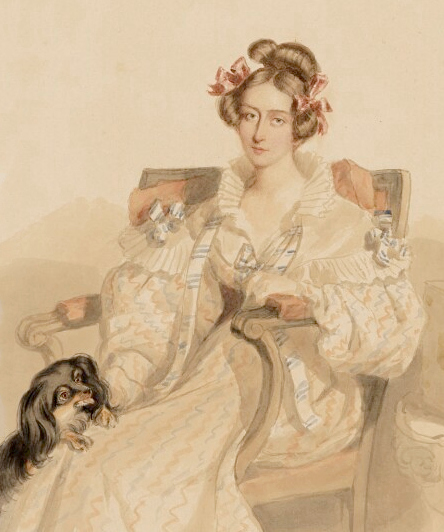
Emily Eden (George Eden's sister) with her spaniel, Chance (painted 1835)

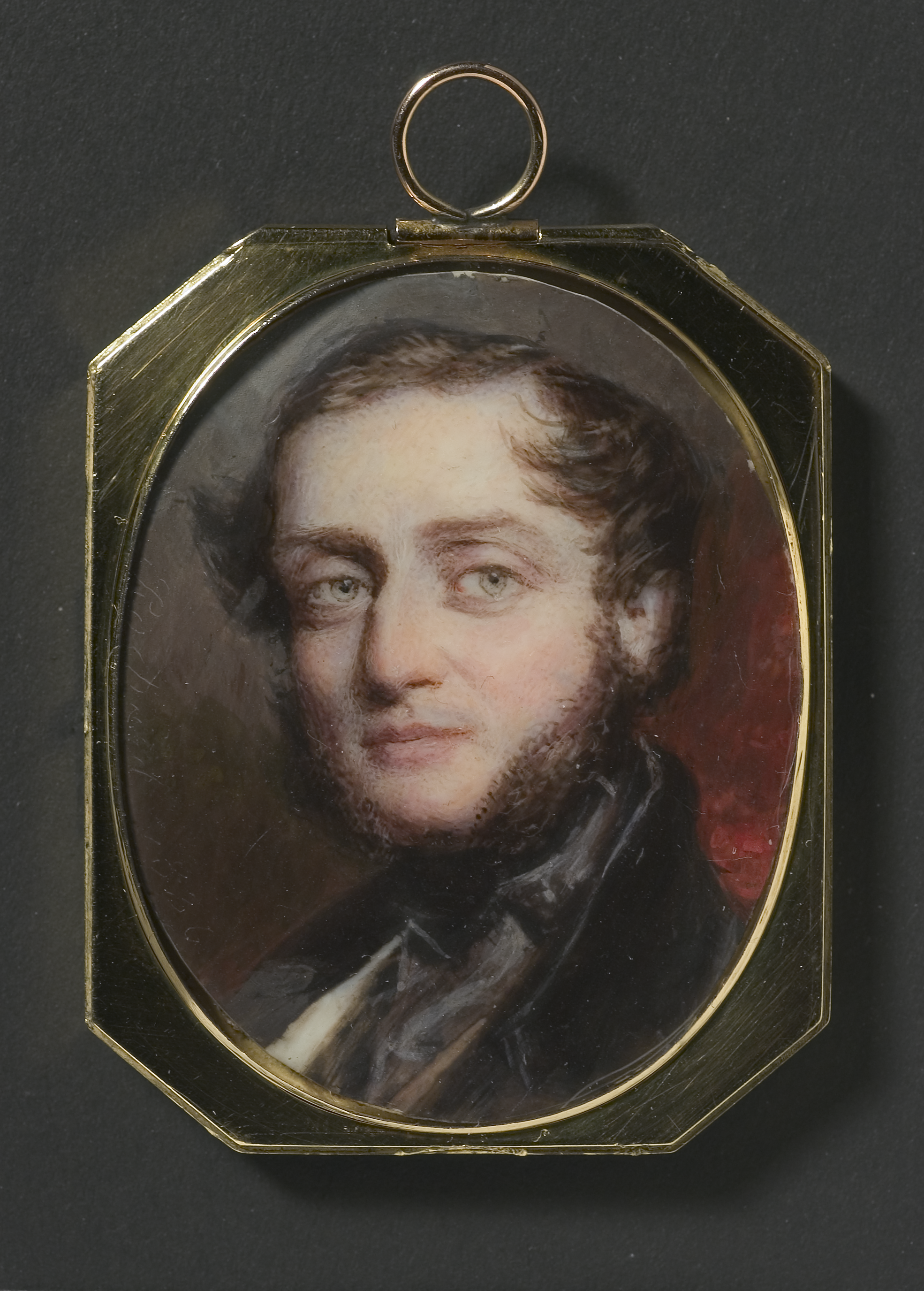
Unknown man (painted 1836)

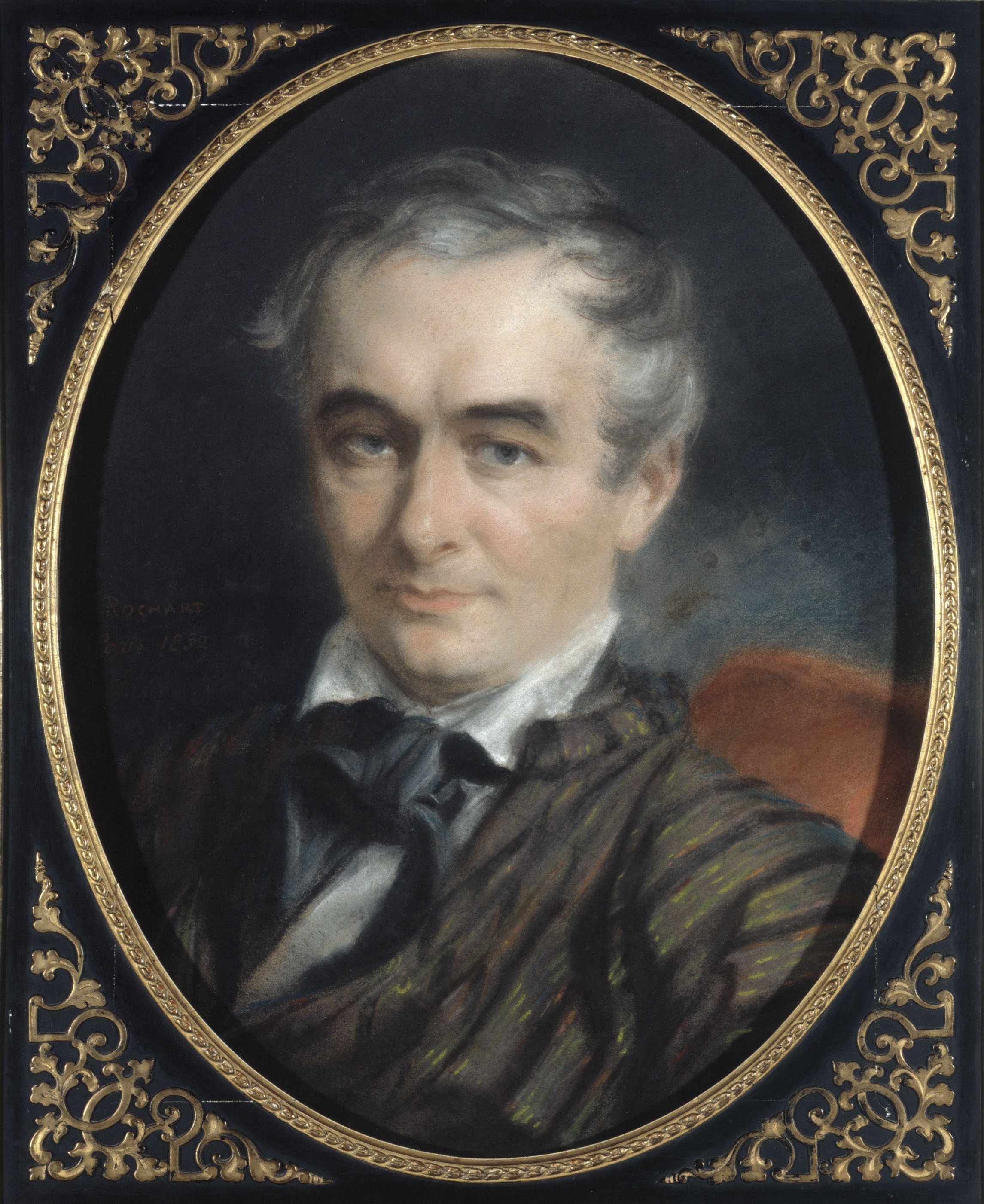
Prosper Mérimée (painted 1852)

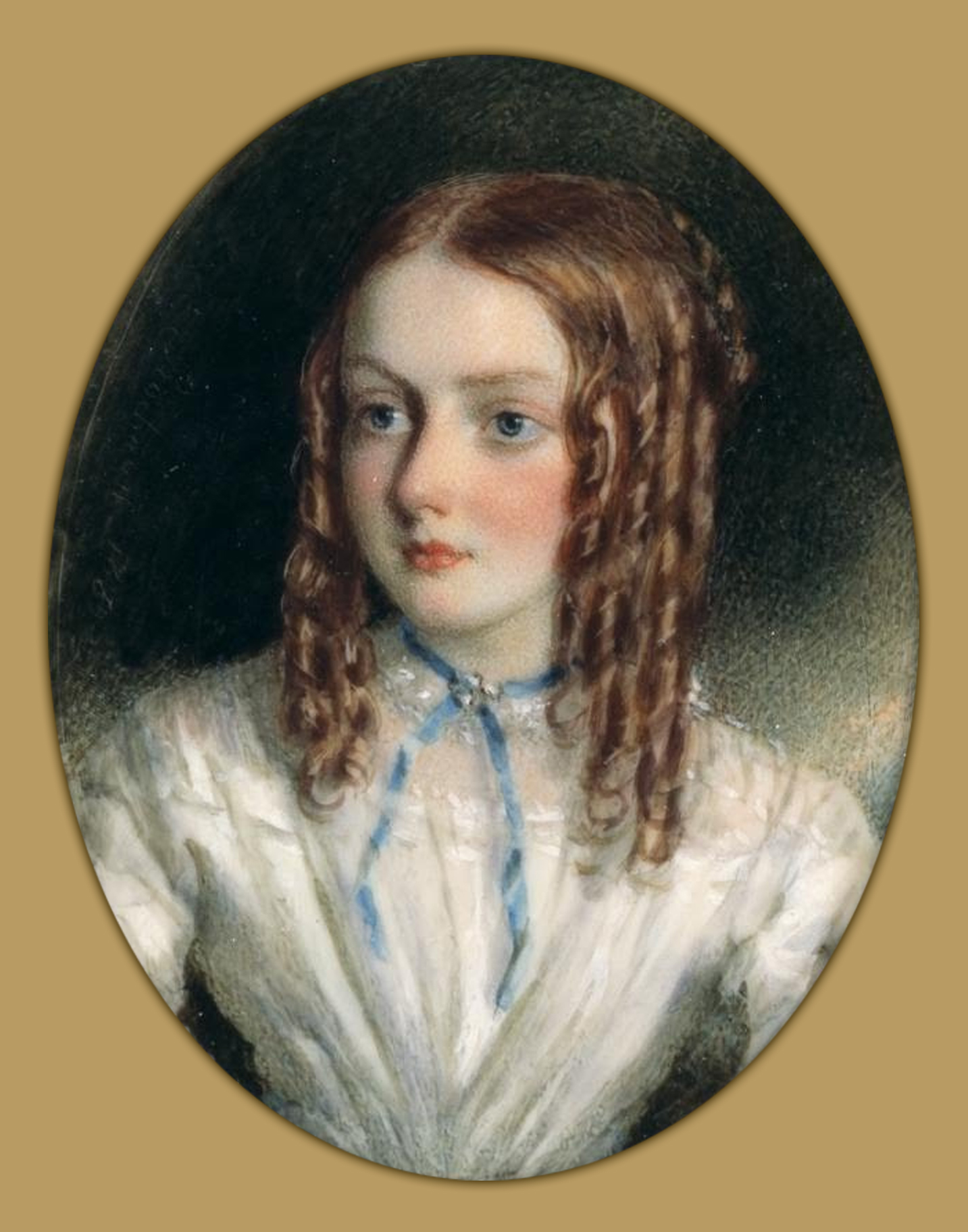
Gertrude Ann Barnardiston Yates (painted 1853)
