= Pierre-Nicolas André-Murville =

French poet and playwright

Pierre-Nicolas André called de Murville, (1754–1815) was an 18th- and 19th-century French poet and playwright.

The son of a director of fodder in Alsace, Murville competed at the age of 19, for the poetry prize of the Académie française, did not obtain it, and for some years was one of the most stubborn competitors. Finally in 1776, he shared the same price with a certain Gruet, a student of Jacques Delille. In 1785, Murville received the encouragement award from said Académie.

During the French Revolutionary Wars, he served in the army as a captain. Returning to Paris, he gave himself again to the letters, and died almost destitute.

Among his many productions, which, for most, rose hardly above the mediocre, it falls les Adieux d’Hector et d’Andromaque, a play which shared the prize in 1776; l’Épitre à Voltaire, who got the runner-up in 1779; the comedy Melcourt et Verseuil, which had some success in 1785, and the tragedy Abdelazis et Zuleima, presented in 1791.

The Almanach des Muses poetry magazine and other collections contain many of his verse.

He married the daughter of Sophie Arnould, singer at the Académie royale de musique.

== Works ==
- 1773: Épître d’un jeune poète à un jeune guerrier, play in competition for the prize by the Académie française, J.-B. Brunet.
- 1774: Les Bienfaits de la nuit, ode competing for the prize of the Académie française.
- 1775: Épître sur les avantages des femmes de trente ans, play in competition for the prize of the Académie française in 1775, D.-C. Couturier père.
- 1776: L’Amant de Julie d’Étange, ou épitre d’Hermotine à son ami, Esprit.
- 1779: Épître à Voltaire, piece that got the runner-up to the judgment of the Académie française in 1779, Demonville.
- 1781: Le Rendez-vous du mari, ou le Mari à la mode, one-act comedy in verse, premiered at the Théâtre des Tuileries, by the Comédiens français ordinaires du roi, 1 December, Vve Duchesne 1782.
- 1785: Melcour et Verseuil, one-act comedy in vers, premiered by the Comédiens français ordinaires du roi, 8 August, Prault.
- 1786: Lausus et Lydie, five-act tragedy in verse, Brunet.
- 1788: Lanval et Viviane, ou les fées et les chevaliers, comedy héroïco-féérique in 5 acts and verse mingled with singing and dancing, presented first by the Comédiens Français, Saturday 13 September 1788, Prault.
- 1790: Le Paysage du Poussin, ou Mes illusions, épître à M. Bounieu, peintre... et Dioclétien à Salone, ou Dialogue entre Dioclétien et Maximien. Plays which were in competition for the poetry prize of the Académie française in 1790. By M. de Murville, the author.
- 1791: Abdélazis et Zuleima, tragedy in 5 acts in verse, premiered at the Théâtre Français of rue de Richelieu, Monday 3 October, Maradan.
- 1794: Eumène et Codrus, ou la Liberté d’Athènes, Republican tragedy in three acts and in verse, Lafforest.
- 1808: L’Année champêtre, poëme en quatre chants and in free verse, followed by various poems, L. Collin.
- 1811: Ode sur l’heureux accouchement de S. M. l’impératrice reine Marie-Louise d’Autriche, et sur la naissance de S. M. le roi de Rome, F. Didot.
- 1811: Ode sur le prochain accouchement de S. M. l’impératrice reine Marie-Louise d’Autriche, impr. de P. Didot l’aîné.
- 1812: Héloïse, drame en 3 actes et en vers, représentée à Paris, au théâtre de l’Impératrice, 27 October, J.-G. Dentu, 1812.
- 1813: Les Infiniment Petits, ou Précis anecdotique des événements qui se sont passés au théâtre de l’Odéon les 22 et 29 novembre 1812, Delaunay.

== Sources ==
- Courtin, Eustache-Marie (1830). Encyclopédie moderne: Dictionnaire abrégé des hommes et des choses, des sciences, des lettres et des arts, avec l'indication des ouvrages où les divers sujets sont développés et approfondis (in French). Vol. 16. Brussels: Th. Lejeune. p. 418..
