= Emilie Bounieu =

French painter (died 1831)

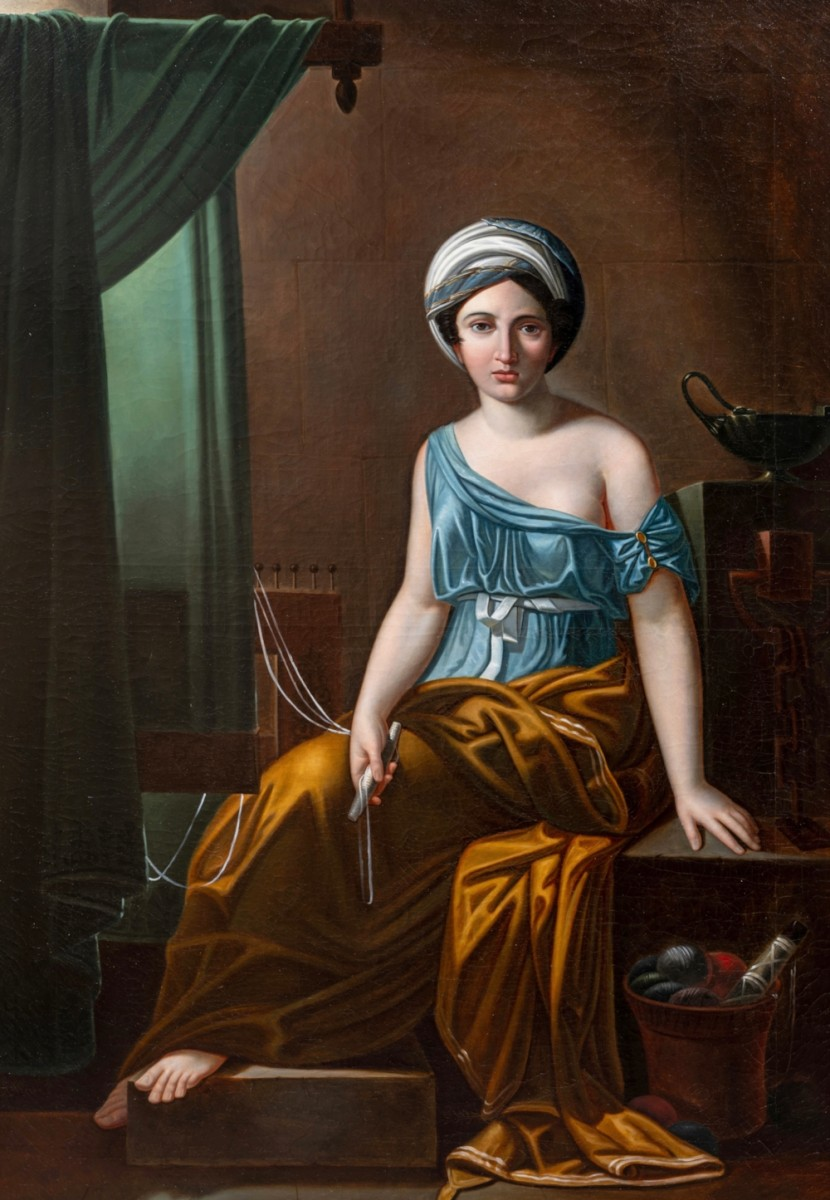
Helen, embroidering, sees Laodice approach (1800)

Gabrielle-Antoinette-Émilie Bounieu (c.1768– 11 April 1831), also known as Émilie Bounieu or Madame Raveau, was a French painter and miniaturist active from the French Revolution through the Bourbon Restoration. She exhibited regularly at the Paris Salon between 1793 and 1819, producing both large-scale mythological paintings and portrait miniatures.

== Life ==
Gabrielle-Antoinette-Émilie Bounieu was born around 1768 in Paris to the painter and engraver Michel-Honoré Bounieu and Jacqueline-Françoise Fourier. She was raised in a family of artists. Her father enjoyed a successful career as a history and genre painter, while her cousin, Antoine Vestier, was one of the most prominent portraitists of late eighteenth-century Paris. Of her own generation, Bounieu shared a particularly close bond with the painter Marie-Nicole Vestier, Antoine Vestier's daughter.

Bounieu trained in her father's studio, where she developed an approach to figure painting. From her mid-twenties, she began exhibiting frequently at the Paris Salon. She later became a teacher herself, instructing students in miniature painting. Among her known pupils was Simon Jacques Rochard.

In September 1819, Bounieu married the architect Antoine-Rémy Raveau. The marriage contract was signed before the notary Monsieur Bauchau and was witnessed by Antoine Vestier. Throughout much of her career, Bounieu maintained a studio at the corner of the rue de Paradis and the rue du Faubourg-Saint-Denis in Paris. In later life she lived at 43 rue de Lille, where she died on 11 April 1831.

In contemporary accounts, Bounieu is most frequently mentioned alongside her father, though her work is compared favourably to his. After Michel-Honoré Bounieu's death, Émilie inherited and retained several of his paintings, some of which were later bequeathed to her cousin Marie-Nicole Vestier. Some of her own work is conserved by the Muséum national d'Histoire naturelle in Paris, while other pieces remain in private collections.

== Salon exhibitions ==
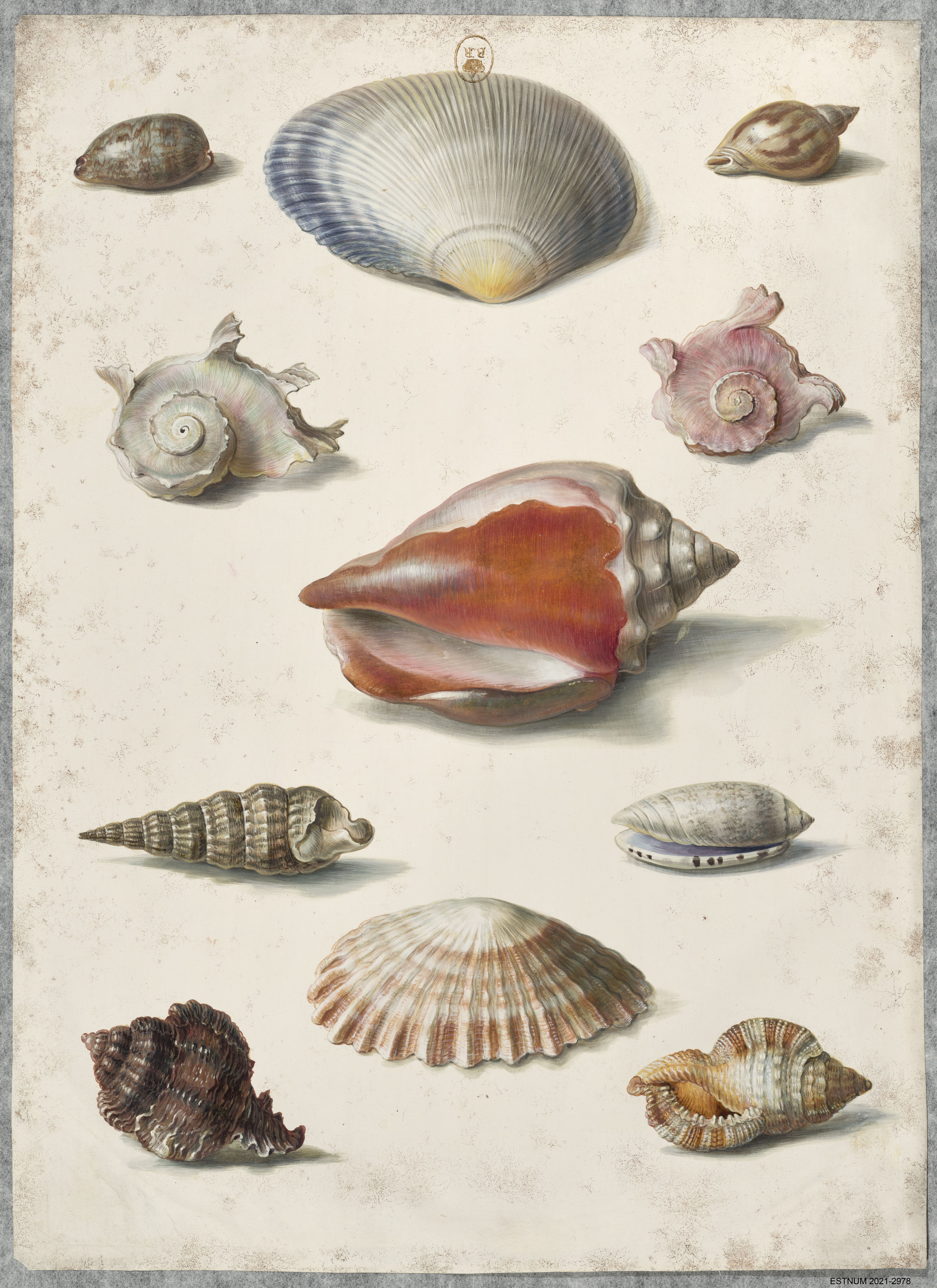
Coquillages by Émilie Bounieu

Bounieu began exhibiting at the Paris Salon in 1793, during the early years of the French Revolution, and continued to do so for more than twenty-five years. Her work encompassed miniature portraiture, genre scenes, and large-scale mythological paintings. Her Salon entries demonstrate a sustained engagement with classical and allegorical subjects, including Psyché, Venus, Galatea, Pygmalion, Helen, and Laodice, alongside intimate genre scenes and portrait miniatures.

A selection of her recorded Salon entries includes:

1793

- Une femme qui peint (A Woman Painting)

1798

- Deux tableaux peints en miniature, renfermés dans un même cadre : une tête d’étude et un portrait de femme (Two miniature paintings in a single frame: a study head and a female portrait)

1800

- Hélène, occupée à broder, voit arriver Laodice (Helen, embroidering, sees Laodice approach)
- Tête de jeune garçon (Head of a Young Boy) – miniature

1801

- Une Bacchante (A Bacchante)
- Portrait du citoyen B. (Portrait of Citizen B.)
- Portrait de femme (Portrait of a Woman) – miniature

1802

- Tableau représentant Psyché (Painting depicting Psyche)
- Une femme occupée à peindre (A Woman Painting) – miniature

1804

- Vénus blessée par Diomède, soutenue par Iris (Venus wounded by Diomedes, supported by Iris)
- Une femme assise devant une table (A Woman Seated at a Table)
- Portrait ovale de Mme L. (Oval Portrait of Madame L.) – miniature
- Un cadre renfermant des miniatures (A Frame Containing Miniatures)

1806

- Pygmalion amoureux de sa statue (Pygmalion in Love with His Statue)
- Portrait de Mme R. (Portrait of Madame R.)

1808

- Psyché (Psyche)
- Une jeune femme assise sur une fenêtre (A Young Woman Seated at a Window)
- La Vérité dans le vin (Truth in Wine)

1810

- Galatée (Galatea)

1812

- Jeune dame s’accompagnant du luth, et répétant, pour charmer l'ennui de l'absence, Suivez l’honneur, mais ne m’oubliez pas (Young Lady Accompanying Herself on the Lute and Repeating, to charm away the boredom of absence, Follow honour, but do not forget me)

1819

- Portrait de M. Marmont, chirurgien-dentiste (Portrait of Mr. Marmont, Dental Surgeon)
