= La Guzla =

Literary hoax

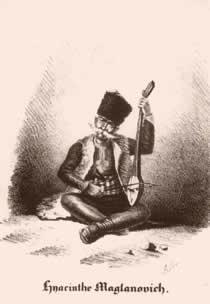
- Hyacinthe Maglanović, the alleged narrator of La Guzla; book frontispiece
- Language: French
- Subject: fabricated poems from the ancient Adriatic province of Illyria
- Publication date: 1827
- Publication place: France

La Guzla, ou Choix de poesies illyriques, recueillies dans la Dalmatie, la Bosnie, La Croatie et l'Hertzegowine ('The Guzla, or a Selection of Illyric Poems Collected in Dalmatia, Bosnia, Croatia and Herzegovina') was a 1827 collection of poems created by French writer Prosper Mérimée.

The poems, supposedly narrated by local man Hyacinthe Maglanović and then "pseudotranslated" into French, turned out to be a literary hoax.

== Content ==
La Guzla was presented as a collection of translations (in fact, pseudotranslations) of folk ballads narrated by a guzlar ('gusle player') Hyacinthe Maglanović, complete with invented commentaries. Of 29 ballads, only one of them – Triste ballade de la noble épouse d'Assan-Aga – was authentic, having notably been previously translated by Johann Wolfgang von Goethe.

The poems were highly romantic, including stories about werewolves and phantoms. Mérimée drew upon many historic sources for his picturesque and gothic portrait of the Balkans, including a tale about vampires taken from the writings of the 18th-century French monk Dom Calmet.

== Analysis ==
La Guzla was intended as satirical commentary on the exaggerated and bombastic style of the era that people would get swept up in. This was especially true for works that included a foreign setting and placed an emphasis on local traditions. Mérimée wrote in 1840 that he used five or six Illyrian words and a couple of pedantic sources to write La Guzla in only two weeks. He went on to say: "From that day on I was disgusted with local color, seeing how easy it was to fabricate it."

After La Guzla, his stories focused more on France and the present time, and avoided using sensationalized topics. Instead of romanticism and its pillars that he'd come to disdain, he employed a more realistic approach, writing traditional stories with no unnecessary lyricism.

== Influence ==
The Russian poet Alexander Pushkin translated 11 ballads from La Guzla into his cycle Songs of the Western Slavs, before he was notified by Mérimée, through his Russian friend Sobolevsky, that most of the work was fabricated.

The book was not commercially successful, selling only a dozen copies, but the poems published in literary journals were widely praised both in France and abroad, establishing Mérimée as an important literary figure. La Guzla was admired by such literary giants as Pushkin, Goethe, Mikhail Lermontov, and Adam Mickiewicz.
