= Léonor Mérimée =

French painter (1757-1836)

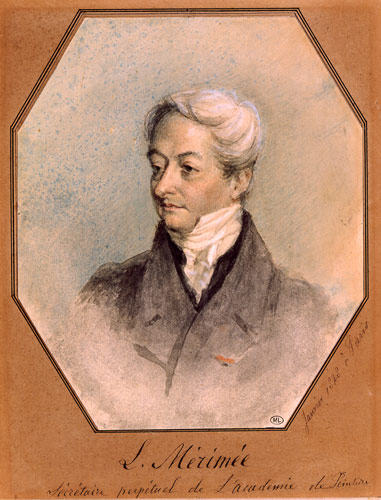
Jean-François Léonor Mérimée, portrait by Simon Jacques Rochard (1828)

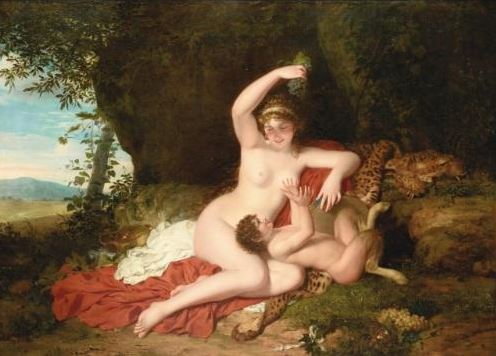
Erigone and Bacchus

Jean-François Léonor Mérimée (16 September 1757 – 26 September 1836) was a French writer, painter and chemist, specializing in pigment color in painting and decorative art. He was the father of the famous author Prosper Mérimée.

== Biography ==
He was born in Broglie. His father was François Merimée (c. 1715–1795), a lawyer at the Parlement de Rouen and author of "Treatise on fiefs and feudal rights in Normandy according to the natural order of matters and procedure divided into 5 parts (1760). He also served as a steward for the Maréchal de Broglie.

He studied at the Collège de Caen before entering the Académie royale de peinture in 1778, where he studied with Gabriel-François Doyen and François-Élie Vincent. His fellow students included Charles Meynier, Jacques-Augustin-Catherine Pajou and Charles Thévenin. In 1787, he was awarded second place in the Prix de Rome and achieved third place in 1788. This was followed by a trip to Holland, where he studied the Dutch Masters, after which he went to Rome. He stayed there until 1793, when certain events of the Revolution forced him to return home.

He was given housing by the "Société Populaire et Républicaine des Arts" at the Louvre, where he undertook research on methods of preserving art by means of chemistry. In 1796, he began formal training on the conservation and restoration of paintings. He was removed from his position at the École centrale des Travaux publics during the Bourbon Restoration, but remained as "Perpetual Secretary" of the École des beaux-arts de Paris.

In 1802, he married Anne Moreau (1774–1852), a portrait painter who was the granddaughter of Jeanne-Marie Leprince de Beaumont. That same year, he held his final exhibition at the Salon.

Thereafter Mérimée turned his attention to the history of art and in particular, the chemistry, use and application of pigment color and oil paint. Mérimée performed numerous experiments on the composition of paintings including those of Raphael, Leonardo da Vinci and Titian. He was also interested in the manufacture of paper, engraving, weaving and metallurgy. In 1830, Mérimée published the results of his work, which had a major influence on the modern process of restoration: De la peinture à l’huile : ou, Des procédés matériels employés dans ce genre de peinture, depuis Hubert et Jean Van-Eyck jusqu’à nos jours (1830). An English translation by W. B. Sarsfield Taylor was published in London in 1839.

While the majority of this book was devoted to pigment analysis, varnishes, materials and the preservation of paintings, Mérimée devoted a chapter to color theory. In this chapter, Mérimée referred to "three simple colours (yellow, red and blue)" and that these can through admixture, produce a large gamut of color nuances. Ünited in pairs, these three primitive colours give birth to three other colours as distinct and brilliant as their originals; thus, yellow mixed with red, gives orange; red and blue, violet, and green is obtained by mixing blue and yellow" (Mérimée, 1839, p245). Mérimée illustrated these color relationships with a simple diagram located between pages 244 and 245: Chromatic Scale (Echelle Chromatique).

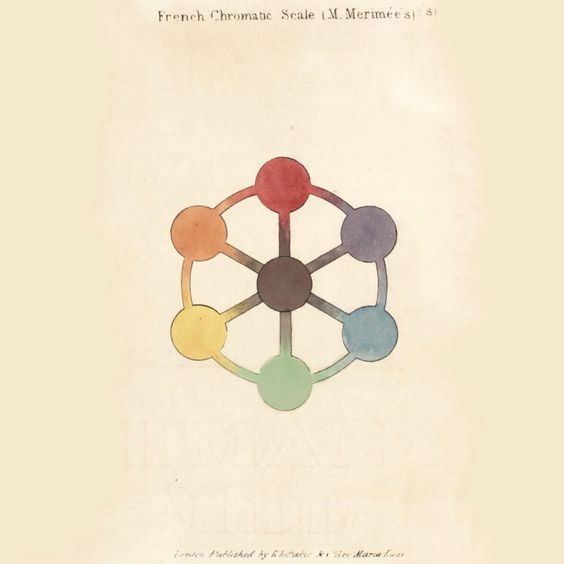
Chromatic Scale (Echelle Chromatique), J. F. L Mérimée (1830, 1839)

Mérimée died in 1836 in Paris.

Augustin-Jean Fresnel, the civil engineer and physicist, was his nephew.

== Publications ==
- Rapport fait par M. Mérimée, au nom du Comité des arts chimiques, sur les faïences imprimées de MM. Stone Coquerel et Legros-d'Anisy, dans "Bulletin de la Société d'encouragement, No. LXIV, imprimerie de Mme Huzard, Paris, 1809, (Online)
- Rapport fait à la Société d'encouragement pour l'industrie nationale au nom du Comité des arts chimiques sur une nouvelle poterie de MM. Fabry et Utzschneider, à Sarguemines, dans "Bulletin de la Société d'encouragement, No. LXIX, imprimerie de Mme Huzard, Paris, 1810 (Online)
- Rapport fait par M. Mérimée, au nom d'une Commission spéciale, sur la manufacture de rasoirs établie à Thiers, département du Puy-de-Dôme, par MM. Brasset-l'Héraud, père et fils, dans "Bulletin de la Société d'encouragement, No. LXXXIII, imprimerie de Mme Huzard, Paris, 1811 (Online)
- De la peinture à l’huile : ou, Des procédés matériels employés dans ce genre de peinture, depuis Hubert et Jean Van-Eyck jusqu’à nos jours, Paris, Mme Huzard, 1830 (Online)
