= Júlio César de Mello e Souza =

Brazilian mathematician (1895–1974)

Júlio César de Melo e Sousa
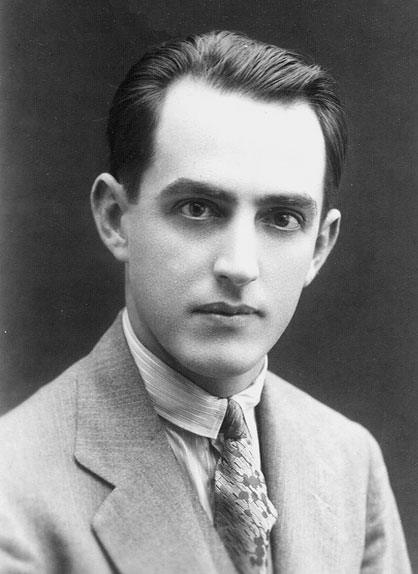
- Júlio César pre-1920
- Born: 6 May 1895; Rio de Janeiro, Brazil
- Died: 18 June 1974 (aged 79); Recife, Brazil
- Writing career
- Pen name: Malba Tahan
- Subject: Mathematics
- Notable work: The Man Who Counted

Júlio César de Mello e Souza (Rio de Janeiro, May 6, 1895 – Recife, June 18, 1974), was a Brazilian writer and mathematics teacher. He was well known in Brazil and abroad for his books on recreational mathematics, most of them published under the pen name of Malba Tahan, a fictitious Persian scholar.

He wrote 69 novels and 51 books of mathematics and other subjects. Júlio César's most popular books, including The Man Who Counted, are collections of mathematical problems, puzzles, curiosities, and embedded in tales inspired by the Arabian Nights. He thoroughly researched his subject matters — not only the mathematics, but also the history, geography, and culture of the Islamic Empire which was the backdrop and connecting thread of his books. Yet Júlio César's travels outside Brazil were limited to short visits to Buenos Aires, Montevideo, and Lisbon: he never set foot in the deserts and cities he described in his books.

Júlio César was very critical of the educational methods used in Brazilian classrooms, especially for mathematics. "The mathematics teacher is a sadist," he claimed, "who loves to make everything as complicated as possible." In education, he was decades ahead of his time, and his proposals are still more praised than implemented today.

For his books, Júlio César received a prize by the prestigious Brazilian Literary Academy and was made a member of the Pernambuco Literary Academy. The Malba Tahan Institute was founded in 2004 at Queluz to preserve his legacy. In 2013, the State Legislature of Rio de Janeiro determined his birthday, May 6, to be commemorated as the Mathematician's Day.

== Early life ==
Júlio César was born in Rio de Janeiro but spent most of his childhood in Queluz, a small rural town in the State of São Paulo. His father, João de Deus de Mello e Souza, was a civil servant with limited salary and eight (some reports say nine) children to support.

In 1905 he was sent with his older brother, João Batista, to Rio de Janeiro to attend preparatory classes for admission to the prestigious Colégio Militar do Rio de Janeiro, where he studied from 1906 to 1909, and later at Colégio Pedro II.

As a student, Júlio César was not academically successful. In a 1905 letter to their parents, João Batista tells that little Júlio "is bad at writing, and a failure in mathematics". His grade reports at Colégio Pedro II show that he once failed an Algebra exam, and barely passed one on Arithmetic. He later attributed these results to the teaching practices of the time, based on "the detestable method of salivation".

As a child in Queluz, he play with frogs. As an adult, he kept up with this hobby by assembling a large collection of frog statuettes.

His career as a writer began while he was still in high school, when one of his classmates offered him a brand-new pen and a postage stamp from Chile in exchange for an essay on the theme of "Hope", the homework for the next day. According to his memoirs, Júlio was called late at night by other anxious students, and by the next morning he had provided four different essays on "Hope", at 400 réis a piece. He kept on this activity for the rest of the year, writing on "Hate", "Nostalgia", and whatever else the teacher demanded.

Many years later he met his teacher, Silva Ramos, and told him of those dubious activities. When Silva Ramos introduced him jokingly to Raul Pederneiras as a "merchant of Hope and Hate", he got from the man prophetic advice: "Forget Hate and go on selling Hope. Take up this poetic profession, Merchant of Hope: since that business is profitable for the buyer, and even more so for the seller."

== Career ==
=== Writing ===
Júlio began to write tales on his own while still in his teens but did not impress the critics in his family. His brother João Batista recalls that Júlio's tales were full of superfluous characters with bizarre names like "Mardukbarian" or "Protocholóski".

In 1918, at the age of 23, Júlio César presented five of his tales to the editor of the newspaper O Imparcial, where he worked, but his boss did not even look at them. Undaunted, Júlio picked up the manuscripts and brought them back a few days later, this time pretending that they were translations of the work of a certain "R. S. Slady," supposedly the rage in New York City. The first of those tales, The Jew's Revenge, was published in the front page of the next issue of the newspaper; and the rest followed suit.

This experience convinced Júlio to assume a "foreign" pen name. He chose an Arabian identity — because, as he declared in an interview, the Arabs were unsurpassed in the art of storytelling. For the next seven years he prepared himself by studying Arabic and reading all he could on Islamic culture. In 1925, he sold the idea of a series of tales on Oriental themes to Irineu Marinho, editor of the newspaper A Noite (which would later become a Brazilian media conglomerate, the Organizações Globo). His stories, published in the column Contos de Malba Tahan ("Tales of Malba Tahan"), were attributed to a fictitious Arabian scholar of that name, and ostensibly translated by an equally fictitious "Professor Breno Alencar Bianco".

Whether for the catchy pseudonym, or (more likely) for the author's lively style and imagination, his books were a resounding success, and he became a national celebrity. Even though his identity soon was known to everybody, he continued to use the name of Malba Tahan in his public life. He had a rubber stamp made with that name in Arabic script, which he used when grading his student's homework; and, in 1952 — by special permission of Brazilian President Getúlio Vargas — he added "Malba Tahan" to his own legal name.

=== Malba Tahan ===
Malba Tahan, full name Ali Yezzid Izz-Edin ibn-Salim Hanak Malba Tahan, was a fictitious Persian scholar invented by Júlio César, who used him as a pen name. Malba Tahan is claimed to mean “the miller from the oasis” in Arabic, but Tahan was in fact the surname of one of Julio Souza's students, Maria Zechsuk Tahan.

Tahan was allegedly born on May 6, 1885 (exactly ten years prior to Souza's date of birth), in "Muzalit", an apparently fictitious village near Mecca. He spent 12 years living in Manchester, England. He died in 1921 near Riyadh, Arabia, fighting for the freedom of a group of Bedouins. Tahan studied first in Cairo and afterwards went to Constantinople where he concluded his studies of social science. His first literary works date from this period and were published in Turkish in several newspapers and magazines. In 1912, at the age of 27, he received a large inheritance from his father, which allowed him to travel widely around the world, including China, Japan, Russia, India, and Europe.

While in Manchester, his father was a prosperous merchant. After his father retired, the family moved to Cairo where they remained prosperous. Malba Tahan studied first in Cairo and afterwards went to Constantinople where he concluded his studies of social science. His first literary works date from this period and were published in Turkish in several newspapers and magazines. He was still a young man when his friend emir Abd el-Azziz ben Ibrahim appointed him mayor of Medina, a post which he filled with distinction for several years.

=== Teaching ===
Before becoming a teacher, he worked for a time as general assistant at the National Library.

Júlio César graduated as an elementary schoolteacher at the Escola Normal do Distrito Federal in Rio de Janeiro (since renamed Rio de Janeiro Institute of Education), and as a civil engineer at the Escola Politécnica in 1913. He started lecturing as a substitute teacher at the Colégio Pedro II, and later became a teacher at the Escola Normal. He began teaching history, geography and physics, and only later moved to mathematics.

In time he became Chair at the Colégio Pedro II, at the Instituto de Educação, at the teacher's school of the Universidade do Brasil (which would become the Federal University of Rio de Janeiro) and at the National School of Education, where he got the title of Professor Emeritus.

Besides his classes at the teacher's school, he delivered over 2000 lectures on the teaching of mathematics and wrote many books on the subject. In all his works Júlio defended the use of games as teaching aids, and the replacement of chalk-and-blackboard lectures by "mathematics laboratories" where students could engage in creative activities, self-study, and object manipulation — a proposal that was seen as heretical at the time.

In the Brazilian 0-to-10 grading system, Júlio would never give a zero grade. "Why give a zero, when there are so many numbers to choose from?" he used to say. He would give the brightest students the task of teaching the weaker ones: "by the end of the first semester, they would all be above the pass line." he claimed. While his methods and style charmed his students, he had the opposition of many of his colleagues, who found his approach of connecting mathematics to everyday life as demeaning.

Julio César also spread his message through radio programmes of several stations in Rio de Janeiro, including the Rádio Nacional, Radio Clube, and Rádio Mayrink Veiga, as well as in television, at the TV Tupi of Rio and the TV Cultura of São Paulo.

Júlio César's last public lecture was delivered in Recife, at the age of 79, to an audience of future teachers. It was about the art of storytelling. Back to his hotel room he apparently suffered a heart attack and died.

=== Other activities ===
Júlio was an energetic campaigner for the cause of the Hanseniacs (lepers), who had historically been banned and confined in leper colonies. For over 10 years he edited the magazine Damião, which preached the end of the prejudice and re-incorporation of former inmates into the society. In his testament, he left a message to the Hanseniacs, to be read at his funeral.

== Books ==
- Aventuras do Rei Baribê, "Adventures of King Baribê"
- A Caixa do Futuro, "The Box of the Future."
- Céu de Alá, "Allah's Heaven"
- A Sombra do Arco-Íris, "The Rainbow's Shadow"
- O Homem que Calculava, "The Man Who Counted", 224p. (1938) ISBN 9780393034301
- Lendas do Céu e da Terra, "Legends of Heaven and Earth"
- Lendas do Deserto, "Legends of the Desert"
- Lendas do Oásis, "Legends of the Oasis"
- Lendas do Povo de Deus, "Legends of God's People"
- Maktub!, "It is Written!"
- Matemática Divertida e Curiosa, "Enjoyable and Curious Mathematics", 158p., ISBN 85-01-03375-8.
- Os Melhores Contos, "The Best Tales"
- Meu Anel de Sete Pedras, "My Ring of Seven Stones"
- Mil Histórias Sem Fim, "A Thousand Unending Tales" (2 volumes)
- Minha Vida Querida, "My Dear Life"
- Novas Lendas Orientais, "New Oriental Legends"
- Salim, o Mágico, "Salim, the Magician"
- Acordaram-me de Madrugada, "They Woke Me Up In the Middle of the Night" (memoirs).
