= Prosper Mérimée =

French writer, archaeologist and historian (1803–1870)

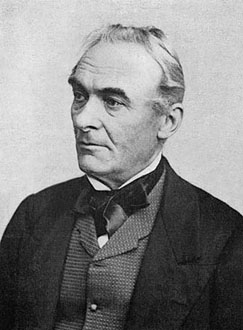
- Born: 28 September 1803; Paris, France
- Died: 23 September 1870 (aged 66); Cannes, France
- Occupations: Writer, historian, archaeologist Senator (1853–1870), member of the Académie Française (elected 1844)
- Parent: Léonor Mérimée (father)
- Relatives: Augustin-Jean Fresnel (cousin); Fulgence Fresnel (cousin); Jeanne-Marie Leprince de Beaumont (great-grandmother)
- Writing career
- Notable works: La Vénus d'Ille (1837); Carmen (1845)
- Movement: Romanticism

Signature
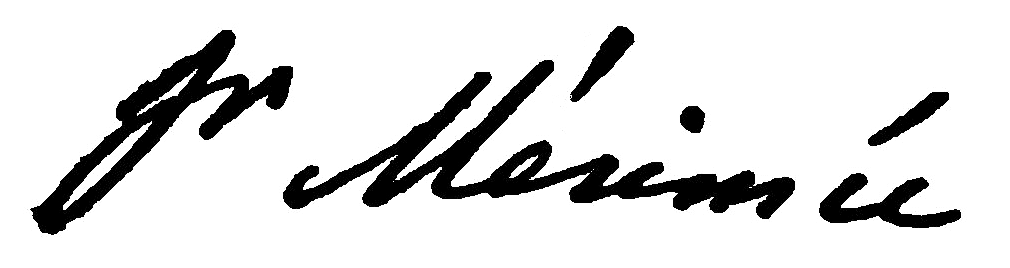

Prosper Mérimée (French: [pʁɔspɛʁ meʁime]; 28 September 1803 – 23 September 1870) was a French writer in the movement of Romanticism, one of the pioneers of the novella, a short novel or long short story. He was also a noted archaeologist and historian, an important figure in the history of architectural preservation. He is best known for his novella Carmen, which became the basis of Bizet's opera of the same name. He learned Russian, a language for which he had great affection, before translating the work of several notable Russian writers, including Pushkin and Gogol, into French. From 1830 until 1860 he was the inspector of French historical monuments, responsible for the protection of many historic sites, including the medieval citadel of Carcassonne and the restoration of the façade of the cathedral of Notre-Dame de Paris. Along with the writer George Sand, he discovered the series of tapestries called The Lady and the Unicorn, arranging for their preservation. He was instrumental in the creation of Musée national du Moyen Âge in Paris, where the tapestries now are displayed. The official database of French monuments, the Base Mérimée, bears his name.

== Education and literary debut ==
Prosper Mérimée was born in Paris, the French First Republic, on 28 September 1803, early in the Napoleonic era. His father Léonor was a painter who became professor of design at the École polytechnique, and studied the chemistry of oil paints. In 1807 his father was named Permanent Secretary of the Academy of Painting and Sculpture. His mother Anne was twenty-nine when he was born and was also a painter. His father's sister, Augustine, was the mother of the physicist Augustin-Jean Fresnel and the orientalist Fulgence Fresnel. He was the great-grandson of French novelist Jeanne-Marie Leprince de Beaumont on his mother's side.

Both of Mérimée's parents spoke English well, traveled frequently to England and entertained many British guests. By the age of fifteen he was fluent in English. He had a talent for foreign languages, and besides English mastered classical Greek and Latin. Later in life he became fluent in Spanish, and could passably speak Serbian and Russian.

At the age of seven, Prosper was enrolled in the Lycée Napoléon, which after the fall of Napoleon in 1815 became the Lycée Henri-IV. His classmates and friends were the children of the elite of Restoration France, including Adrien Jussieu, son of famous botanist Antoine Laurent de Jussieu, and Jean-Jacques Ampère, son of André-Marie Ampère, famous for his research in physics and electrodynamics. In school he had a strong interest in history, and was fascinated by magic and the supernatural, which later became important elements in many of his stories.

He finished the Lycée with high marks in classical languages and in 1820 he began to study law, planning for a position in the royal administration. In 1822 he passed the legal examinations and received his license to practice law. However, his real passion was for French and foreign literature: In 1820 he translated the works of Ossian, the presumed ancient Gaelic poet, into French. At the beginning of the 1820s he frequented the salon of Juliette Récamier, a venerable figure in the literary and political life of Paris, where he met Chateaubriand and other prominent writers. In 1822, at the salons, he met Henri Beyle, twenty years older, who became one of his closest friends, and later became famous as a novelist under the pen name of Stendhal. He then began to attend the salon of Étienne Delécluze, a painter and art critic, whose members were interested in the new school of Romanticism in art and literature.

Between the spring of 1823 and the summer of 1824, he wrote his first literary works: a political and historical play called Cromwell; a satirical piece called Les Espagnols en Dannark (The Spanish in Denmark); and a set of six short theater pieces called the Théâtre de Clara Gazul, a witty commentary about the theater, politics and life which purported to be written by a Spanish actress, but which actually targeted current French politics and society. In March 1825 he read his new works at the salon of Delécluze. The first two works were quickly forgotten, but the scenes of Clara Gazul had considerable success with his literary friends. They were printed in the press under the name of their imaginary author, and were his first published work. Balzac described Clara Gazul as "a decisive step in the modern literary revolution", and its fame soon reached beyond France; the German Romanticist Goethe wrote an article praising it. Mérimée was not so gracious toward Goethe; he called Goethe's own work "a combination of genius and German naïveté".

King Louis XVIII died in 1824, and the regime of the new King, Charles X, was much more authoritarian and reactionary. Mérimée and his friends became part of the liberal opposition to the regime. On 30 November 1825, he took part in a student demonstration led by the young but already famous Victor Hugo. He was invited to Hugo's home, where he charmed the poet by making macaroni for him. Mérimée was drawn into the new romantic movement, led by the painter Eugène Delacroix and the writers Hugo, Alfred de Musset and Eugène Sue. In 1830 he attended the riotous premiere of Hugo's play Hernani, bringing with him a group of friends, including Stendhal and the Russian writer Ivan Turgenev, to support Hugo. Hugo made an anagram from his name, transforming Prosper Mérimée into Premiere Prose.

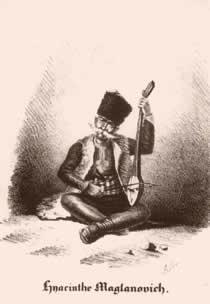
Frontispiece of La Guzla, showing the purported author, Hyacinthe Maglanovich

In July 1827 he published in a literary journal a new work, La Guzla. Ostensibly it was a collection of poems from the ancient Adriatic province of Illyria (modern Croatia), and it was published under another assumed name, Hyacinthe Maglanovich. The poems were highly romantic, filled with phantoms and werewolves, and were intended as satirical commentary on the exaggerated and bombastic style of the era that people would get swept up in. This was especially true for works that included a foreign setting and placed an emphasis on local traditions. Mérimée drew upon many historic sources for his picturesque and gothic portrait of the Balkans, including a tale about vampires taken from the writings of the 18th-century French monk Dom Calmet. These poems, published in literary journals, were widely praised both in France and abroad. The Russian poet Alexander Pushkin had translated some of the poems in the book into Russian before he was notified by Mérimée, through his Russian friend Sobolevsky, that the poems, except for one Mérimée translated from a real Serbian poet, were not authentic. The book was not a commercial success, selling only a dozen copies, but the journals and press made Mérimée an important literary figure. From then on Mérimée's stories and articles were regularly published by the two leading literary magazines of Paris, the Revue des deux Mondes and the Revue de Paris.

After La Guzla, he wrote three traditional novels: La Jacquerie (June 1828) was an historical novel about a peasant revolt in the Middle Ages, filled with flamboyant costumes, picturesque details and colorful settings. The critic Henri Patin reported that novel was "lacking in drama, but many of the scenes were excellent". The second, La Famille Carvajal (1828), was a parody of the work of Lord Byron, set in 17th-century New Granada, filled with murders and crimes of passion. Many of the critics entirely missed that the novel was a parody: the Revue de Paris denounced the story for its "brutal and shameful passions". The third was A Chronicle of the Reign of Charles IX (1829), another historical novel, set during the reign of Charles IX of France in the 16th century. It was written three years before Victor Hugo published his historical novel Notre-Dame de Paris. Mérimée's story featured a combination of irony and extreme realism, including a detailed and bloody recreation of the St. Bartholomew's Day massacre. It was published in March 1829, without any great success, and its author was by then tired of the genre. "I wrote a wicked novel that bores me", he wrote to his friend Albert Stapfer.

== Novellas, travels in Spain and government posts (1829–1834) ==
In 1829, Mérimée found a new literary genre that perfectly suited his talents; the nouvelle or novella, essentially a long short story or short novel. Between 1829 and 1834, he wrote thirteen stories, following three basic principles; a brief story told in prose; a sparse and economical style of writing, with no unneeded lyricism; and a unity of action, all leading to the ending, which was often abrupt and brutal. In a short period Mérimée wrote two of his most famous novellas, Mateo Falcone, about a tragic vendetta in Corsica, and Tamango, a drama on a slave-trading ship, which were published in the Revue de Paris, and had considerable success.

He also began a series of long trips which provided material for much of his future writing. In June 1830 he traveled to Spain, which he explored at a leisurely pace, spending many hours in the Prado Museum in Madrid, attending bullfights, and studying Moorish architecture in Córdoba and Seville. He was in Spain in July 1830, when the government of Charles X of France was overthrown and replaced by the rule of Louis Philippe I. Fascinated by Spain, he decided not to return to France immediately, but to continue his journey. In October 1830 he met Cipriano Portocarrero, a liberal Spanish aristocrat and the future Count of Montijo, who shared many of his literary and historical interests and political views. He visited the Count and met his wife, the Countess of Montijo, and their young daughter, Eugénie, then four years old, who in 1853 was to become the Empress Eugénie, the wife of Emperor Napoleon III.

He returned to Paris in January 1831, and began publishing vivid accounts of his trip to Spain in the Revue de Paris under the title Lettres d'Espagne. These included the first mention of Carmen, a story told to him by the Countess of Montijo. He also sought a position in the new administration of King Louis Philippe. Many of his friends had already found jobs in the new government; Stendhal was named French consul to Trieste, and the writers Chateaubriand and Lamartine both received honorary government posts. Mérimée, twenty-seven years old, briefly served as the chief of the secretariat of the Ministry of the Navy, and then, as the new government was organized, was moved from post to post; for a short time he was director of fine arts, then was moved to the Interior Ministry, where, he wrote ironically, "I conducted, with great glory, the telegraph lines, the administration of the corps of firemen, the municipal guards, etc." He turned out to be an efficient administrator, and was put in charge of organizing the response to the epidemic of cholera which struck Paris between 29 March and 1 October 1832, killing eighteen thousand Parisians. At the peak of the epidemic, he spent much of his time at the Hotel-Dieu, the main hospital of Paris. In November 1832 he was moved again to the State Council, where he became Chief of Accounts. He was not there for long; in December 1832 Prime Minister Adolphe Thiers sent him to London on an extended diplomatic mission to report on the British elections. He became a member of the most prominent London club, the Athenaeum, and consulted with the venerable French ambassador to England, Prince Talleyrand.

== Inspector-General of Historical Monuments (1833–1852) ==
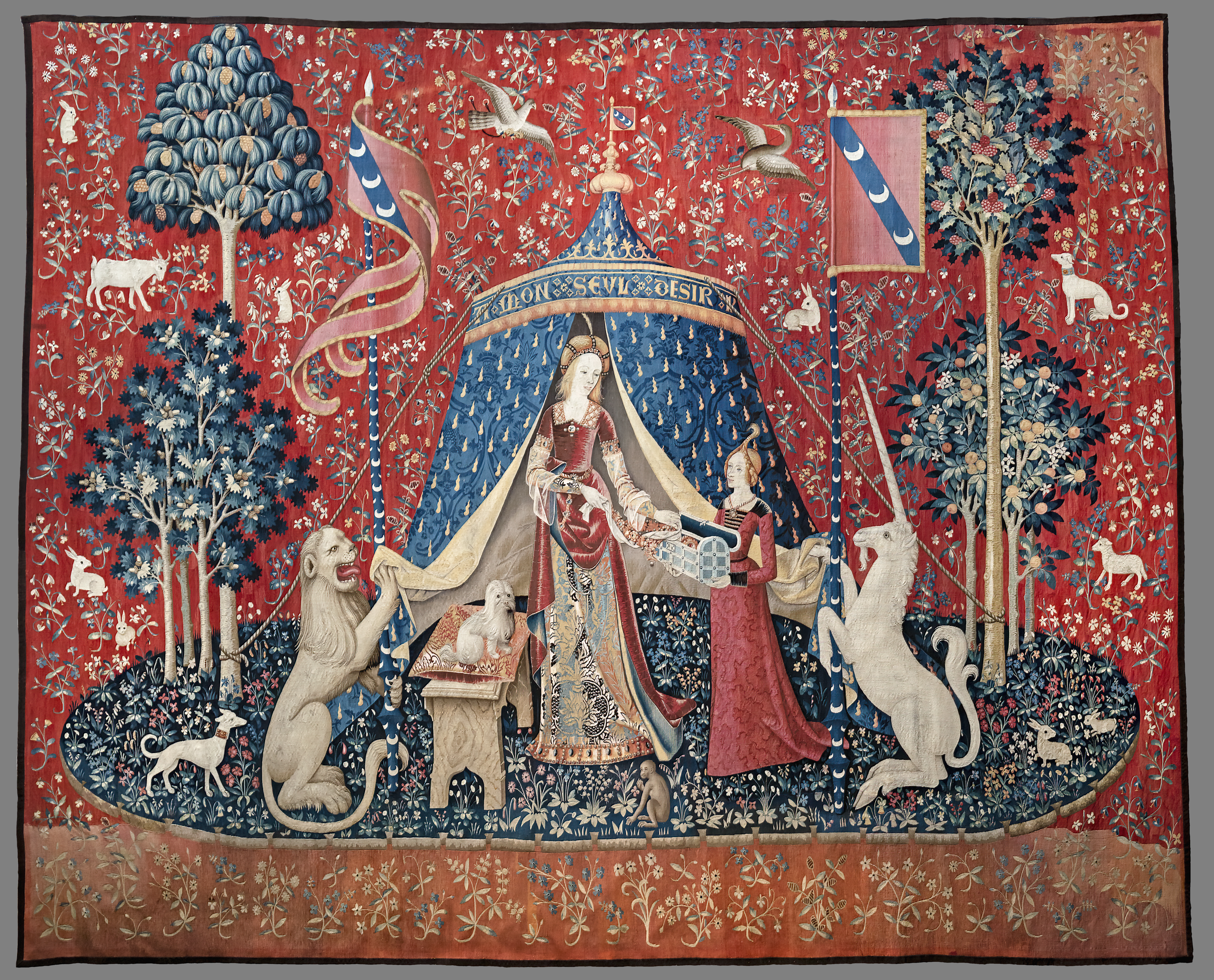
One of The Lady and the Unicorn tapestries discovered in 1841 by Mérimée and George Sand in the Château of Boussac

On 27 May 1833, Prime Minister Thiers named Mérimée inspector-general of historical monuments, with a salary of eight thousand francs a year, and all travel expenses paid. Mérimée wrote that the job perfectly suited "his taste, his laziness, and his ideas of travel".

A large part of the architectural heritage of France, particularly the churches and monasteries, had been damaged or destroyed during the Revolution. Of the 300 churches in Paris in the 16th century, only 97 still were standing in 1800. The Basilica of St Denis had been stripped of its stained glass and monumental tombs, while the statues on the façade of the cathedral of Notre-Dame de Paris and the spire had been taken down. Throughout the country, churches and monasteries had been demolished or turned into barns, cafes, schools, or prisons. The first effort to catalog the remaining monuments was made in 1816 by Alexandre de Laborde, who wrote the first list of "Monuments of France". In 1832 Victor Hugo wrote an article for the Revue des deux Mondes which declared war against the "massacre of ancient stones" and the "demolishers" of France's past. King Louis Philippe declared that restoration of churches and other monuments would be a priority of his regime. In October 1830, the position of Inspector of Historical Monuments had been created by the Interior Minister, François Guizot, a professor of history at the Sorbonne. Mérimée became its second Inspector, and by far the most energetic and long-lasting. He held the position for twenty-seven years.

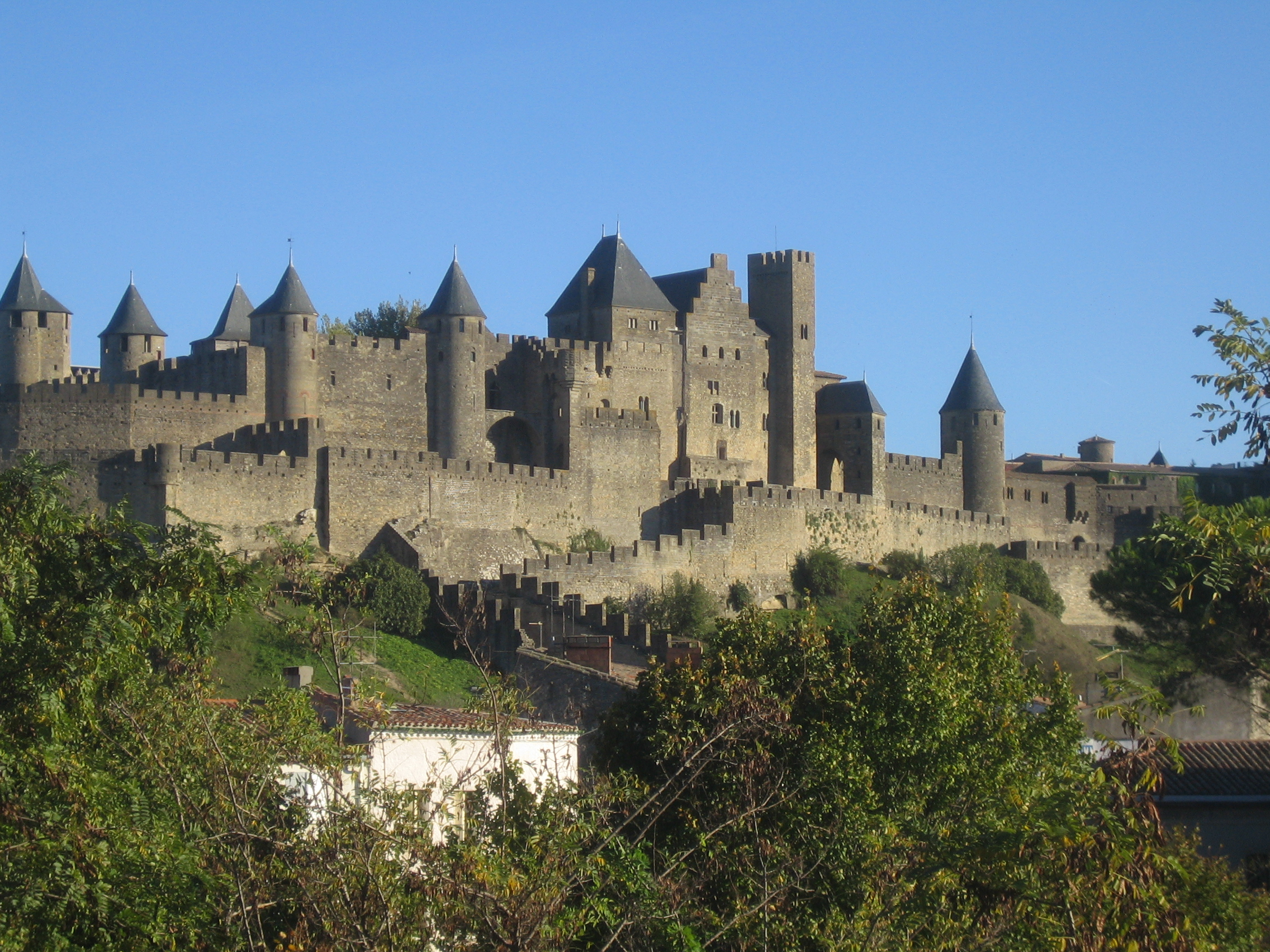
The fortified medieval town of Carcassonne, made a monument in 1860

Mérimée had honed his bureaucratic skills in the Interior Ministry, and he understood the political and the financial challenges of the task. He approached his new duties methodically. He first organized a group of architects specialized and trained in restoration, and had the money that previously had been given to the Catholic Church for restoration transferred to his budget. On 31 July 1834, he set off on his first inspection tour of historic monuments, traveling for five months, describing and cataloging the monuments he saw. Between 1834 and 1852 he made nineteen inspection tours to different regions of France. The longest, to the Southeast and to Corsica, lasted five months, but most trips were shorter than a month. When he returned after each trip, he made a detailed report to the Ministry on what needed to be done. In addition, he wrote scholarly studies for journals of archaeology and history. His scholarly works included a survey of the religious architecture in France during the Middle Ages (1837) and of military monuments of the Gauls, Greeks and Romans (1839). Finally, he wrote a series of books for a popular audience about the monuments of each region, describing vividly a France that he declared was "more unknown than Greece or Egypt".

In 1840 he published the first official List of Historic Monuments in France, with 934 entries. By 1848 the number had grown to 2,800. He organized a systematic review to prioritize restoration projects, and established a network of correspondents in each region who kept an eye on the projects, made new discoveries, and signaled any vandalism. Though he was a confirmed atheist, many of the buildings he protected and restored were churches, which he treated as works of art and shrines of national history. He often disputed with local church authorities, insisting that more recent architectural modifications be removed, and the buildings restored to their original appearance. He also confronted local governments who wanted to demolish or convert old structures. With the authority of the royal government behind him, he was able prevent the city of Dijon from turning the medieval Palace of Estates into an office building, and he stopped the city of Avignon from demolishing the medieval ramparts along the Rhône River to make way for railroad tracks.

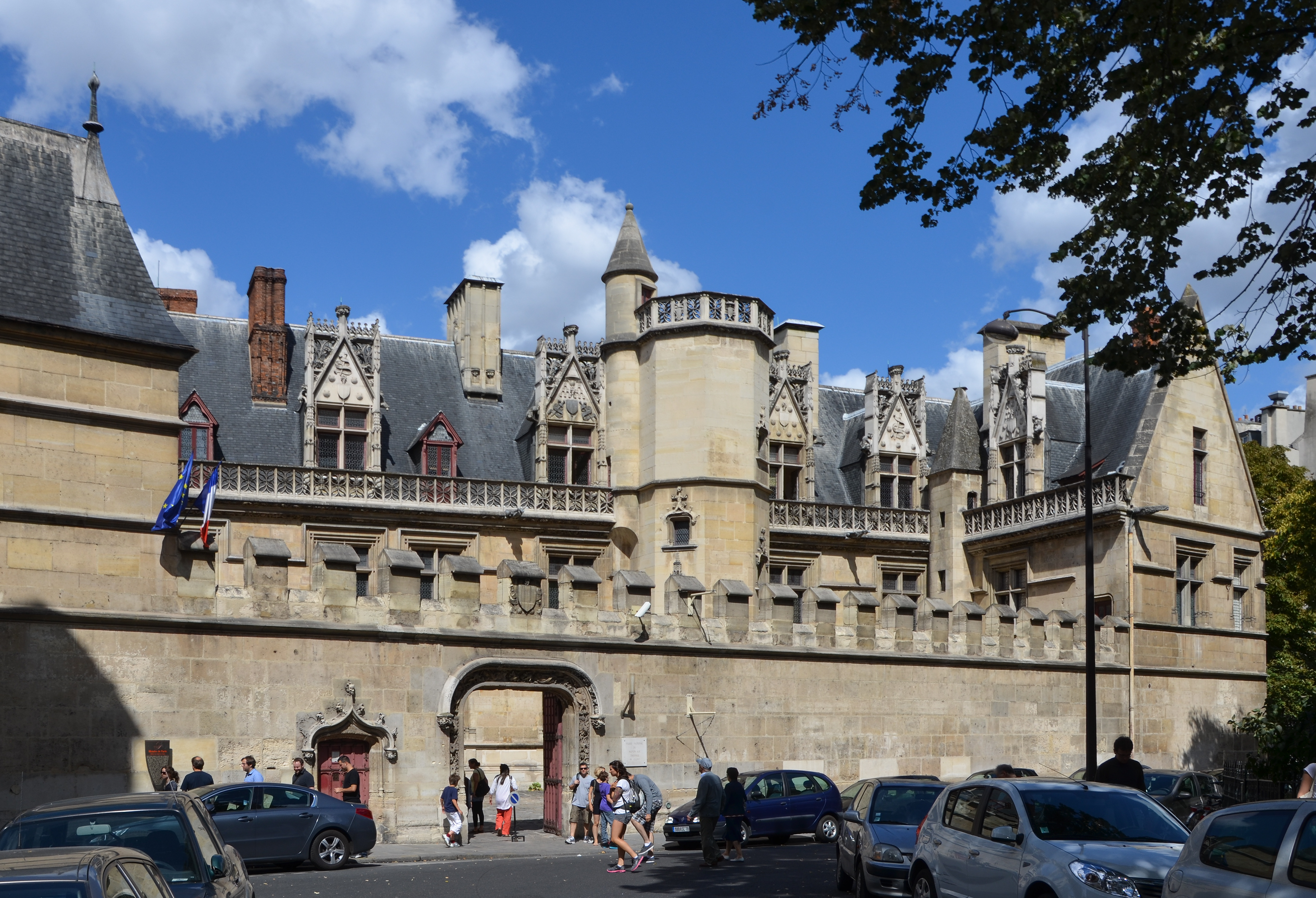
The Musée national du Moyen Âge, created by Mérimée in 1844

He was assisted in several of his projects by the architect Eugène Viollet-le-Duc. Viollet-le-Duc was twenty-six, and had studied mathematics and chemistry but not architecture; he learned his profession from practical experience and travel. In 1840 he worked the first time for Mérimeé; in one month he designed a solution which prevented the collapse of the medieval Vézelay Abbey. In 1842–43, Mérimée gave him a much more ambitious project, restoring the facades of the Cathedral of Notre-Dame de Paris. He returned the statues which had been removed during the French Revolution, and later restored the spire.

Mérimée warned his conservators to avoid the "false-ancient": he ordered them to carry out "the reproduction of that which manifestly existed. Reproduce with prudence the parts destroyed, where there exist certain traces. Don't give yourself to inventions... When the traces of the ancient state are lost, the wisest is to copy the analog motifs in a building of the same type in the same province". However, some of his restorers, notably Viollet-le-Duc, were later criticized for sometimes being guided by the spirit of the gothic or romanesque architectural style, if the original appearance was not known.

He participated personally in the restoration of many of the monuments. His tastes and talents were well suited to archaeology, combining an unusual linguistic talent, accurate scholarship, remarkable historical appreciation, and a sincere love for the arts of design and construction. He had some practical skills in design. A few pieces of his own art are held by the Walters Art Museum in Baltimore, Maryland. some of which, with other similar pieces, have been republished in his works.

In 1840–41, Mérimée made an extended tour of Italy, Greece and Asia Minor, visiting and writing about archaeological sites and ancient civilizations. His archaeology earned him a seat in the Académie française des Inscriptions et Belles-Lettres, and his stories and novellas won him a seat in the Académie Française in 1844. In 1842, he arranged for the French state to purchase a medieval building, the Hôtel d'Cluny, as well as the adjoining ruins of the Roman baths. He had them joined and supervised both the construction and the collection of medieval art to be displayed. The museum, now called the Musée national du Moyen Âge, opened on 16 March 1844.

In 1841, during one of his inspection tours, he stayed at the Château of Boussac, Creuse in the Limousin district of central France, in the company of George Sand, who lived nearby. Together they explored the castle, which had recently been taken over by the Sub-Prefecture. In an upstairs room they found the six tapestries of the series The Lady and the Unicorn. They had suffered from long neglect, and had been damaged by damp and mice, but Mérimée and Sand immediately recognized their value. Mérimée had the tapestries inscribed in the list of monuments and arranged for their conservation. In 1844 Sand wrote a novel about them and correctly dated them to the 15th century, using the ladies' costumes for reference. In 1861 they were purchased by the French state and brought to Paris, where they were restored and put on display in the Musée national du Moyen Âge, which Mérimée had helped create, where they can be seen today.

== La Vénus d'Ille, Colomba and Carmen (1837–1845) ==
While he was researching historical monuments, Mérimée wrote three of his most famous novellas; La Vénus d'Ille (1837), Colomba (1840) and Carmen (1845). The Venus d'Ille was a by-product of his 1834 monument inspection tour to Roussillon, to the village of Casefabre and the Priory of Serrabina, near Ille-sur-Têt. The novella tells the story of a statue of Venus that comes to life and kills the son of its owner, whom it believes to be its husband. The story was inspired by a story of the Middle Ages recounted by the historian Freher. Using this story as an example, Mérimée described the art of writing fantasy literature; "Don't forget that when you recount something supernatural, one should describe as many details of concrete reality as possible. That is the great art of Hoffmann and his fantastic stories".

Colomba is a tragic story about a Corsican vendetta. The central character, Colomba, convinces her brother that he must kill a man to avenge an old wrong done to their family. This story was the result of his long trip to that island researching historic monuments, and is filled with details about Corsican culture and history. When it was published in the Revue des deux Mondes it had an immense popular success. It is still widely studied in French schools as an example of Romanticism.

Carmen, according to Mérimée, was based upon a story which the Countess of Montijo had told him during his visit to Spain in 1830. It tells of a beautiful Bohémienne (Romani) who robs a soldier, who then falls in love with her. Jealous over her, he kills another man and becomes an outlaw, then he discovers she is already married, and in jealousy he kills her husband. When he learns she has fallen in love with a picador, he kills her, and then is arrested and sentenced to death. In the original story told to Mérimée by the Countess, Carmen was not a Bohémienne, but since he was studying the Romani language and Romani culture in Spain and in the Balkans, he decided to give her that background. Carmen did not have the same popular success as Colomba. It did not become really famous until 1875, after Mérimée's death, when it was made into opera by Georges Bizet. The opera Carmen made major changes to Mérimée's story, including eliminating the role of Carmen's husband.

Mérimée was anxious to solidify his literary reputation. He first campaigned methodically for election to the French Academy of Inscriptions and Belles-Lettres, the highest academic body, which he finally attained in November 1843. He next campaigned for a seat in the most famous literary body, the Académie Française. He patiently lobbied the members each time a member died and a seat was vacant. He was finally elected on 14 March 1844, on the seventeenth round of voting.

== The Second Republic and translation of Russian literature (1848–1852) ==
At the end of 1847 Mérimée completed a major work on Spanish history, the biography of Don Pedro I, King of Castile. It was six hundred pages long and published in five parts in the Journal des Deux Mondes between December 1847 and February 1848.

In 1847 he read Boris Godunov by Alexander Pushkin in French, and wanted to read all of Pushkin in the original language. He took as his Russian teacher Madame de Langrené, a Russian émigré who had once been the dame of honor of the Grand Duchess Marie, daughter of Tsar Nicholas I of Russia. By 1848 he was able to translate Pushkin's The Queen of Spades into French; it was published on 15 July 1849 in the Revue des deux Mondes. He began to attend the literary salon of the Russian writers in Paris, the Cercle des Arts on rue Choiseul, to perfect his Russian. He translated two more Pushkin stories, The Bohemians and The Hussar, as well as Dead Souls and The Inspector General by Nikolai Gogol. He also wrote several essays on Russian history and literature. In 1852, he published a scholarly article, An Episode of the History of Russia; the False Dimitri, in the Revue des Deux Mondes.

In February 1848, as a member of the National Guard, he was a spectator at the French Revolution of 1848 that toppled King Louis Philippe and founded the French Second Republic. On 8 March, he wrote to his friend Madame de Montijo: "Here we are in a republic, without enthusiasm, but determined to hold onto it because it is the sole chance of safety that we still have". The new government abolished the Bureau of Historic Monuments and merged its function into the Department of Fine Arts; however, Mérimée retained the position of Inspector of Historic Monuments, and his membership on the Commission of Historic Monuments. In December 1848, Louis Napoleon Bonaparte was elected the first president of Second Republic in December 1848, and Mérimée resumed his activity. In 1849 he helped organize a successful campaign to preserve the medieval Citadel of Carcassonne. In 1850 he arranged for the crypt of Saint-Laurent in Grenoble to be classified as an historical monument.

The year 1852 was difficult for Mérimée. On 30 April 1852, his mother, who lived with him and was very close to him, died. He also became entangled in a legal affair involving one of his friends, Count Libri Carrucci Della Sommaja, a professor of mathematics from Pisa Count who settled in France in 1824 and became a professor at the Sorbonne, a member of College of France, a holder of the Legion of Honor, and the Inspector General of Libraries of France. It was discovered that under his academic cover he was stealing valuable manuscripts from state libraries, including texts by Dante and Leonardo da Vinci, and reselling them. When he was exposed, he fled to England, taking 30,000 works in sixteen trunks, and claimed that he was victim of a plot. Though all the evidence was against Count Libri, Mérimée took his side, and in April 1852 wrote a scathing attack on Libri's accusers in the Revue des deux Mondes. He attacked the incompetence of the prosecutors and blamed the Catholic Church for inventing the case. On the same day that his mother died, he was summoned before the state prosecutors, and was sentenced to fifteen days in prison and fined one thousand francs. The Revue des deux Mondes was also fined two hundred francs. Mérimée offered his resignation from the government, which was refused. He served his sentence inside one of his listed historic monuments, the Palais de la Cité prison, passing the time studying Russian irregular verbs.

== Advisor to the Empress and Senator of the Empire (1852–1860) ==
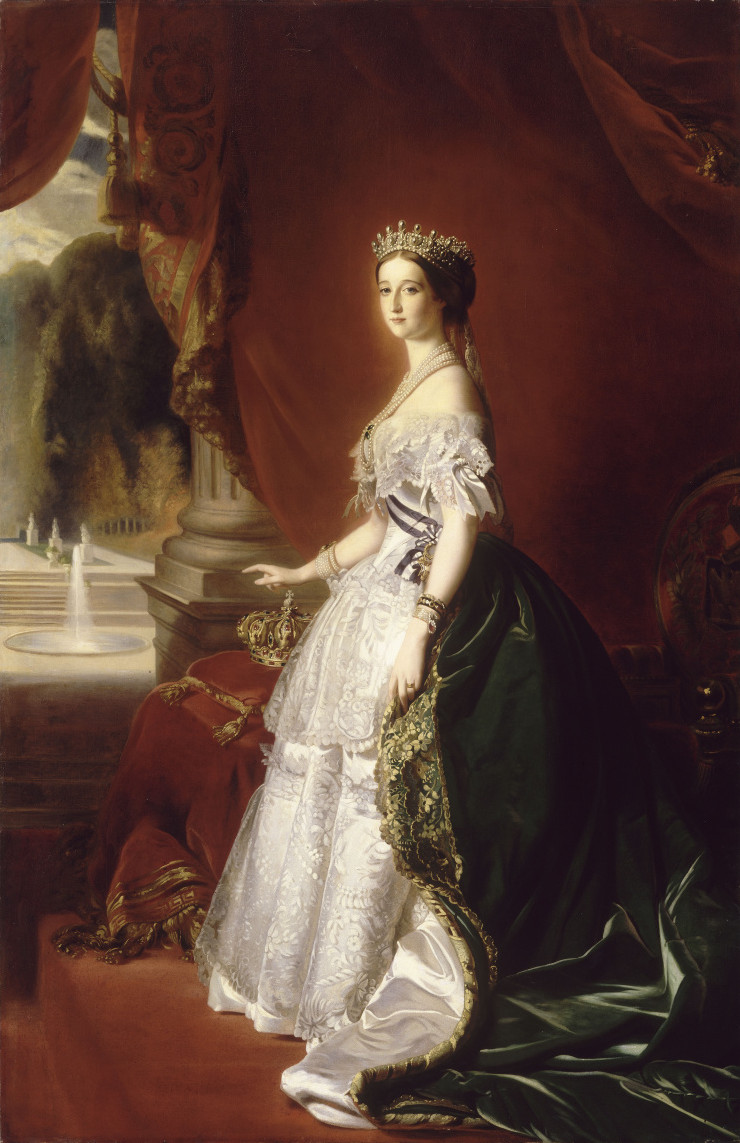
The Empress Eugénie in 1853

In December 1851, President Louis-Napoleon Bonaparte was prevented by the French Constitution from running for re-election. Instead, he organized a coup and became Emperor Napoleon III. Mérimée accepted the coup philosophically, because he feared anarchy more than a monarchy, and because he saw no other practical option. While Mérimée accepted the coup, others, including Victor Hugo, did not. Hugo described his last meeting with Mérimée in Paris on 4 December 1851, just before Hugo went into exile: "'Ah', said M. Mérimée, 'I am looking for you'. I answered, 'I hope that you will not find me'. He extended his hand, and I turned my back. I have not seen him since. I consider that he is dead... M. Mérimée by nature is vile". The services of Mérimée were welcomed by the new Emperor; on 21 January 1852, soon after coup, he was promoted to officer of the Legion of Honor. The new Emperor gave a priority to the preservation of historic monuments, particularly the restoration of the cathedral of Notre-Dame, and Mérimée kept his position and for a time continued his tours of inspection.

Mérimée, without seeking it, soon had another close connection with the Emperor. Eugénie Montijo, the daughter of his close friends the Count and Countess of Montijo, had been invited to an event at the Palace of Saint Cloud, where she met the new Emperor. In November 1852 she was invited to the Palace of Fontainebleau, where the Emperor proposed marriage to her. They were married fifteen days later at the Tuileries Palace, and she became the Empress Eugénie. Honors followed immediately for Mérimée; he was made a Senator of the Empire, with a salary of 30,000 francs a year, and became the confidant and closest friend of the young Empress.

The mother of the Empress, the Countess of Montijo, returned to Spain, and Mérimée kept her informed of everything that the Empress did. He became involved in the court life, moving with the court from imperial residence to residence, to Biarritz, the Château de Compiègne, the Château de Saint-Cloud and Palais de Fontainebleau. It soon became clear the Empress was not the Emperor's only romantic interest; Napoleon III continued his affairs with old mistresses, leaving the Empress often alone. Mérimée became her chief friend and protector at Court. He was obliged to attend all the court events, including masked balls, though he hated balls and dancing. He told stories, acted in plays, took part in charades, and "made a fool of himself", as he wrote to his friend Jenny Dacquin in 1858. "Every day we eat too much, and I am half dead. Destiny did not make me to be a courtesan..." The only events he really enjoyed were the stays at the Château de Compiègne, where he organized lectures and discussions for the Emperor with leading French cultural figures, including Louis Pasteur and Charles Gounod. He met prominent visitors, including Otto von Bismarck, whom he described as "very much a gentleman" and "more spiritual than the usual German".

He gave very little attention to his role as Senator; in seventeen years, he spoke in the chamber only three times. Mérimée had intended to devote a large part of his time to writing a major scholarly biography of Julius Caesar. However, when he informed the Emperor of this project, the Emperor expressed his own admiration for Caesar, and took over the project. Mérimée was obliged to give the Emperor all of his research, and to assist him in writing his book. The History of Julius Caesar was published on 10 March 1865, under the name of Napoleon III, and sold one hundred forty thousand copies on the first day.

== Last works, the fall of the Empire and death (1861–1870) ==
He made his last long tour of monuments in 1853, though he remained the chief inspector of monuments until 1860. He continued to attend meetings of the Académie française and the Academy of Inscriptions. He wrote his last works, three novellas, in the genre of the fantastic: Djoûmane is a story about a soldier in North Africa who sees a sorcerer give a young woman to a snake, then realizes it was just a dream. It was not published until 1873, after his death; La Chambre bleu, written as an amusement for the Empress, is the story of two lovers in a hotel room, who are terrified to find a stream of blood coming under the door of their room, then realize it is only port wine. Lokis is a horror story borrowed from a Danish folk tale, about a creature which is half-man and half bear. This story was also written to amuse the Empress, and he read it aloud to the court in July 1869, but the subject matter shocked the court, and the children were sent from the room. It was published in September 1869 in the Revue des deux Mondes.

He continued to work for the preservation of monuments, attending meetings of the Commission and advising Boeswillwald, who had replaced him as Inspector of Monuments in 1860. On his urging the Commission acted to protect the medieval village of Cordes-sur-Ciel, the Château de Villebon, and the romanesque churches of Saint-Émilion. He also continued to develop his passion for Russian literature, with the help of his friend Turgenev and other Russian émigrés in Paris. He began writing a series of twelve articles on the life of Peter the Great, based on a work in Russian by Nikolai Ustrialov, which appeared in the Journal des Savants between June 1864 and February 1868. He wrote to a friend that "Peter the Great was an abominable man surrounded by abominable villains. That is amusing enough for me". In 1869 he wrote to his friend Albert Stapfer that "Russian is the most beautiful language in Europe, not excepting Greek. It is richer than German, and has a marvelous clarity... It has a great poet and another almost as grand, both killed in duels when they were young, and a great novelist, my friend Turgenev".

In the 1860s he still traveled regularly. He went to England every year between 1860 and 1869, sometimes on official business, organizing the French participation in the 1862 Universal Exposition of Fine Arts in London, and in 1868 to transfer two antique Roman busts from the British Museum to the Louvre, and to see his friend Anthony Panizzi, the director of the British Museum. In 1859 he visited Germany, Italy, Switzerland and Spain, where he attended his last bullfight.

By 1867, he was exhausted by the endless ceremonies and travels of the court, and thereafter he rarely participated in the imperial tours. He developed serious respiratory problems, and began to spend more and more time in the south of France, in Cannes. He became more and more conservative, opposing the more liberal reforms proposed by the Emperor in the 1860s. In May 1869 he declined an invitation to attend the opening of the Suez Canal by the Empress.

The political crisis between Prussia and France that began in May 1870 required his return from Cannes to Paris, where he participated in the emergency meetings of the Senate. His health worsened, and he only rarely could leave his house. The Empress sent him fruit from the imperial gardens, and on 24 June he was visited by his old lover, Valentine Delessert, and by Viollet-le-Duc. His health continued to decline; he told a friend: "It's well over. I see myself arriving at death, and am preparing myself".

The war with Prussia began with patriotic enthusiasm, but quickly turned into a debacle. The French Army and the Emperor were surrounded at Sedan. One of the leaders of the group of deputies advocating the creation of a republic, Adolphe Thiers, visited Mérimée to ask him to use his influence with the Empress for a transition of power, but the meeting was brief; Mérimée would not consider asking the Empress and Emperor to abdicate. He told his friends that he dreaded the arrival of a republic, which he called "organized disorder".

On 2 September, news arrived in Paris that the army had capitulated and that Napoleon III had been taken prisoner. On 4 September, Mérimée got out of bed to attend the last meeting of the French Senate at the Luxembourg Palace. In the chamber he wrote a brief note to Panizzi: "All that the most gloomy and most dark imagination could invent has been surpassed by events. There is a general collapse, a French Army which surrenders, and an Emperor who allows himself to be taken prisoner. All falls at once. At this moment the legislature is being invaded and we cannot deliberate any longer. The National Guard which we just armed pretends to govern. Adieu, my dear Panizzi, you know what I suffer". The Third Republic was proclaimed on the same day. Despite his illness, he hurried to the Tuileries Palace hoping to see the Empress, but the Palace was surrounded by armed soldiers and a crowd. The Empress fled for exile to London, and Mérimée did not see her again.

Mérimée returned to Cannes on 10 September. He died there on 23 September 1870, five days before his 67th birthday. Though he had been an outspoken atheist most of his life, at his request he was buried at the Cimetière du Grand Jas, the small cemetery of the Protestant church in Cannes. A few months later, in May 1871, during the Paris Commune, a mob burned his Paris home, along with his library, manuscripts, archaeological notes and collections because of his close association with the deposed Napoleon III.

== Personal life ==
He lived with his mother and father in Paris until the death of his father in September 1837. From 1838, he shared an apartment with his mother on the Left Bank at 10 rue des Beaux-Arts, in the same building as the offices of the Revue des deux Mondes. They moved to a house at 18 rue Jacob in 1847 until his mother died in 1852.

Mérimée never married, but he needed female company. He had a series of romantic affairs, sometimes carried out by correspondence. In January 1828, during his youth, he was wounded in duel with Felix Lacoste, the husband of his mistress at the time, Émilie Lacoste. In 1831, he began a relationship by correspondence with Jenny Dacquin. Their relationship continued for ten years, but they only met six or seven times, and then rarely alone. In 1873, after his death, she published all of his letters under the title Lettres à une inconnue, or "Letters to an Unknown", in several volumes.

In his youth, he had a mistress in Paris, Céline Cayot, an actress whom he supported financially and paid for an apartment. He then had a longer and more serious relationship with Valentine Delessert. Born in 1806, she was the daughter of Count Alexandre de Laborde, aide-de-camp to King Louis Philippe, and she was married to Gabriel Delessert, a prominent banker and real estate developer, who was twenty years older. Mérimée met Delessert in 1830, and she became his mistress in 1836, when he was visiting Chartres, where her husband had been named Prefect. He wrote to Stendhal that "She is my grand passion; I am deeply and seriously in love". Her husband, who had become prefect of police in Paris, apparently ignored the relationship. However, by 1846, the relationship had cooled, and while he was on one of his long tours, she became the mistress of another writer, Charles de Rémusat. His correspondence shows he was desolate when Delessert abandoned him for younger writers Rémusat and then, in 1854, for Maxime Du Camp. One consolation for Mérimée in his last years was a reconciliation with Delessert in 1866.

In 1833, he had a brief romantic liaison with the writer George Sand, which ended unhappily. After they spent a night together, they separated without warmth. She told a friend, the actress Marie Darval, "I had Mérimèe last night, and it wasn't much". Darval promptly told her friend Alexandre Dumas, who then told all of his friends. Mérimée promptly counter-attacked, calling her "a woman debauched and cold, by curiosity more than by temperament". They continued to collaborate on common goals. They both played a part, in 1834, in the discovery and preservation of The Lady and the Unicorn tapestries; he declared the tapestries were of historic value, and she publicized them in one of her novels. In 1849, he assisted her when she asked that the paintings in the church of Nohant, where she lived, be classified, which he did. He also provided a subsidy of 600 francs to the church. However, she deeply offended him by openly ridiculing the Empress Eugénie. At their last meeting in 1866, he found her hostile. She came to visit him a few days before his death, but he refused to see her.

When he traveled on his inspection trips around France, he often sought the company of prostitutes. He was often cynical about his relationships, writing, "There are two kinds of women; those who are worth the sacrifice of your life, and those who are worth between five and forty francs." Many years later he wrote to Jenny Dacquin, "It is a fact that at one time of my life I frequented bad society, but I was attracted to it through curiosity only, and I was there as a stranger in a strange country. As for good society, I found it often enough deadly tiresome."

He had a very close friendship with Stendhal, who was twenty years older, when they were both aspiring writers, but the friendship later became strained as Mérimée's literary success exceeded that of Stendhal. They traveled together to Rome and Naples in November 1837, but in his correspondence Stendhal complained of the vanity of Mérimée and called him "his Pedantry, Mister Academus". The early death of Stendhal in Paris on 23 March 1842, shocked Mérimée. He offered his correspondence from Stendhal to the Revue des deux Mondes, but the editor refused them as not worthy of attention. In 1850, eight years after the death of Stendhal, Mérimée wrote a brief brochure of sixteen pages describing the romantic adventures that he and Stendhal had had together in Paris, leaving most of the names blank. Only twenty-five copies were made, and distributed to friends of Stendhal. The brochure caused a scandal; Mérimée was denounced as an "atheist" and "blasphemer" by friends of Stendhal for suggesting that Stendhal had ever behaved improperly. He responded that he simply wanted to show that Stendhal was a genius but not a saint.

The poet and critic Charles Baudelaire compared the personality of Mérimée with that of the painter Eugène Delacroix, both men suddenly thrust into celebrity in the artistic and literary world of Paris. He wrote that they both shared "the same apparent coldness, lightly affected, the same mantle of ice covering a shy sensibility, an ardent passion for the good and the beautiful, the same hypocrisy of egoism, the same devotion to secret friends and to the ideas of perfection".

Politically, Mérimée was a liberal in the style of the Doctrinaires, welcomed the July Monarchy, and maintained an affection for Adolphe Thiers and Victor Cousin, with whom he maintained a lifelong correspondence. After the uprisings of 1848, he opted for the stability offered by Emperor Napoleon III, which earned him the ire of the republican opposition such as Victor Hugo. Despite his close relations with the Emperor, Mérimée remained a committed Voltairean and opposed to both "papists" and legitimists (ultra-royalists). He likewise became more critical of both the domestic and foreign policies of the Empire after 1859, and opposed the military adventures in Mexico.

== Literary criticism ==
In his later years, Mérimée had very little good to say about other French and European writers, with a few exceptions, such as his friends Stendhal and Turgenev. Most of his criticism was contained in his correspondence with his friends. He described the later works of Victor Hugo as "words without ideas". Describing Les Misérables, Mérimée wrote: "What a shame that this man who has such beautiful images at his disposal lacks even a shadow of good sense or modesty, and is unable to refrain from saying these platitudes not worthy of an honest man". He wrote his friend Madame Montijo that the book was "perfectly mediocre; not a moment that is natural". Speaking of Flaubert and Madame Bovary, he was a little kinder. He wrote: "There is a talent there which he wastes under the pretext of realism". Describing the Fleurs du mal by Baudelaire, he wrote: "Simply mediocre, nothing dangerous. There are a few sparks of poetry... the work of a poor young man who doesn't know life... I don't know the author, but I'll wager that he is naïve and honest. That's why I hope they don't burn him."

In an essay of October 1851, he attacked the entire genre of Realism and Naturalism in literature: "There is a tendency in almost all of our modern school to arrive at a faithful imitation of nature, but is that the objective of art? I don't believe so".

He was equally scathing in his descriptions of the foreign writers of his time, with the exception of the Russians, particularly Turgenev, Pushkin and Gogol, whom he admired. Of Charles Dickens he wrote: "[He] is the greatest one among the pygmies. He has the misfortune of being paid by the line, and he loves money". He was even harsher toward the Germans: Goethe was "a great humbug", Kant was a "chaos of obscurity", and of Wagner he wrote: "There is nothing like the Germans for audacity in stupidity".

In return, Mérimée was attacked by Victor Hugo, who had admired Mérimée at the beginning of his career, but never forgave him for becoming a senator under Napoleon III. In one of his later poems, he described a scene as being "flat as Mérimée".

== Legacy and place in French literature ==
Mérimée's best-known literary work is the novella Carmen, though it is known principally because of the fame of the opera made from the story by Georges Bizet after his death. He is also known as one of the pioneers of the short story and novella, and also as an innovator in fantasy fiction. His novellas, particularly Colomba, Mateo Falcone, Tamango and La Vénus d'Ille, are widely taught in French schools as examples of vivid style and concision.

Mérimée was an important figure in the Romantic movement of French literature in the 19th century. Like the other Romantics, he used picturesque and exotic settings (particularly Spain and Corsica) to create an atmosphere, and looked more often at the Middle Ages than to classical Greece or Rome for his inspiration. He also frequently used themes of fantasy and the supernatural in his stories, or, like Victor Hugo, used the Middle Ages as his setting. He used a careful selection of details, often noted during his travels, to create the setting. He often wrote about the power relations between his characters; man and woman, slave and master, father and son, and his stories often featured extreme passions, violence, cruelty and horror, and usually ended abruptly in a death or tragedy. He told his stories with a certain distance and ironic tone that was particularly his own.

His development and mastery of the nouvelle, a long short story or short novel, was another notable contribution to French literature. When he began his writing career in the 1830s, the most prominent genres were the drama (Victor Hugo and Musset), poetry (Hugo, Lamartine and Vigny), and the autobiography (Chateaubriand). Mérimée perfected the short story, with an economy of words and action. The contemporary literary critic Sainte-Beuve wrote: "...He goes right to the fact, and goes immediately into action... his story is clear, lean, alert, vivid. In the dialogues of his characters there is not a useless word, and in his actions he lays out in this advance exactly how and why it will have to happen". In this genre, he was the contemporary of Edgar Allan Poe and the predecessor of Guy de Maupassant.

Mérimée's other important cultural legacy is the system of classification of historic monuments that he established, and the major sites that he saved, included the walled citadel of Carcasonne, and his part in the foundation of the National Museum of Medieval History in Paris. The French national list of heritage monuments is called the Base Mérimée in his honor. Another part of his legacy is the discovery and preservation of The Lady and the Unicorn tapestries now on display in the National Museum of Medieval History.

Mérimée's works have received multiple adaptations in various media. In addition to the multiple adaptations of Carmen, several of his other novellas, notably Lokis and La Vénus d'Ille, have been adapted for film and television.

== Works ==
=== Dramatic works ===
- Théâtre de Clara Gazul – several short satirical pieces purportedly by a Spanish actress, Clara Gazul (1825)
- La Jacquerie, scènes féodales – dramatic scenes about a peasant insurrection in the Middle Ages (1828) - the basis for Lalo's opera La jacquerie
- Le carrosse du Saint-Sacrement – a comedy about a theatrical troupe, published the Revue de Paris (1829; the base of Offenbach's La Périchole, and later the film The Golden Coach by Jean Renoir)

=== Poems and ballads ===
- La Guzla, ou Choix de Poésies Illyriques recueillies dans la Dalmatie, la Croatie et l'Herzegowine – ballads pseudotranslated from the original "Illyrian" (i.e. Croatian) by one Hyacinthe Maglanovich (1827)

=== Novels ===
- A Chronicle of the Reign of Charles IX – a novel set at the French court at the time of the St. Bartholomew massacre in 1572 (1829)

=== Novellas ===
- Mateo Falcone – a novella about a Corsican man who kills his son in the name of justice (published in the Revue de Paris; 1829)
- Vision de Charles XI – novella published in Revue de Paris (1829)
- L'Enlevement de la Redoute – historical novella published in the Revue de Paris (1829)
- Tamango – historical novella about the slave trade in the 18th century, published in the Revue de Paris (1829)
- Federigo – novella published in the Revue de Paris (1829)
- La Vase étrusque – novella published in Revue de Paris (1830)
- La Partie de trictrac – novella published in the Revue de Paris (1830)
- La Double Meprise – novella published in Revue de Paris (1833)
- Mosaïque – a collection of the novellas published earlier in the press, as well as three of his letters from Spain (1833)
- Les âmes du Purgatoire – a novella about the libertine Don Juan Maraña.
- La Vénus d'Ille – a fantastic horror tale of a bronze statue that seemingly comes to life (1837)
- Carmen – a novella describing an unfaithful gypsy girl who is killed by the soldier who loves her (1845). It was later the basis of the opera Carmen by Georges Bizet (1875)
- Colomba – a novella about a young Corsican girl who pushes her brother to commit murder to avenge their father's death (1840)
- Lokis – a horror story, set in Lithuania, about a man who appears to be half-bear and half-man. This was his last work published in his lifetime (1868)
- La Chambre bleue – a novella that combines a supernatural tale and farce, written for the amusement of the Court of Napoleon III, published after his death
- Djoûmane – his last novella, published after his death (1870)

=== History, literature, notes on voyages and archaeology ===
- Lettres d'Espagne (Letters from Spain) – descriptions of Spanish life, including the first mention of the character Carmen (1831)
- Notes d'un voyage dans la midi de la France – an account of his first tour as Inspector of Public Monuments (1835)
- Notes d'un voyage dans l'ouest de la France – description of the monuments of western France (1836)
- Notes d'un voyage en Auvergne – description of the monuments of the Auvergne (1838)
- Notes d'un voyage en Corse – description of the monuments of Corsica. This trip gave him the material for his next novella, Colomba (1840)
- Essai sur la guerre sociale – an essay on the Social War in ancient Rome (1841)
- Mélanges historiques et littéraires (1841)
- Études sur l'histoire romaine: vol.1 Guerre sociale, vol.II Conjuration de Catilina (1844)
- Les Peintures de St.-Savin – the first detailed study of the Romanesque murals of the Abbey Church of Saint-Savin-sur-Gartempe, now a UNESCO World Heritage site (1845)
- Histoire de don Pédre, roi de Castille – a biography of Peter of Castile, also known as Peter the Cruel and Peter the Just, ruler of Castile in the 14th century (1848)
- Un Episode de l'histoire de Russie; le faux Demitrius – a study of the history of the False Dmitry in Russian history (1852)
- Histoire du règne de Pierre le Grand – first of a series of articles on the reign of Peter the Great of Russia (1864)
- Les Cosaques de l'Ukraine et leurs derniers attamans (1865)
- Les Cosaques d'autrefois (1865)

=== Translations and criticism of Russian literature ===
- La Dame de pique (The Queen of Spades, "Пиковая дама"), Les Bohémiens (The Gypsies, "Цыганы"), Le Hussard ("Гусар") (1852) by Alexander Pushkin (1852)
- L'Inspecteur général (The Government Inspector; "Ревизор") by Nikolai Gogol (1853)
- Le Coup de pistolet ("Выстрел") by Alexander Pushkin (1856)
- Apparitions ("Призраки") by Ivan Turgenev (1866)
- Articles on Nikolai Gogol (1852), Alexander Pushkin (1868), Ivan Turgenev (1868)

=== Correspondence ===
- Lettres à une inconnue (Letters to an unknown) – a collection of letters from Mérimée to Jenny Dacquin (1874)
- Letters to Panizzi, collection of his letters to the Sir Anthony Panizzi, librarian of the British Museum
- General Correspondence, edited by Parturier, in three volumes (1943)
- "Lettres à Edward Ellice", with an introduction and notes by Marianne Cermakian and France Achener (1963), Bernard Grasset, Paris

Source: Mérimée, Prosper (1927). Œuvres complètes [Complete Works]. Paris: Le Divan.
