= The Man Who Counted =

1938 novel by Júlio César de Mello e Souza

- Paraguayan book cover (c.2000) showing the Spanish-translated title
- Author: Júlio César de Mello e Souza
- Original title: O Homem que Calculava

The Man Who Counted (original Portuguese title: O Homem que Calculava) is a book on recreational mathematics and curious word problems by Brazilian writer Júlio César de Mello e Souza, published under the pen name Malba Tahan. Since its first publication in 1938, the book has been immensely popular in Brazil and abroad, not only among mathematics teachers but among the general public as well.

The book has been published in many other languages, including Catalan, English (in the UK and in the US), German, Italian, and Spanish, and is recommended as a paradidactic source in many countries. It earned its author a prize from the Brazilian Literary Academy.

== Plot summary ==
35 camels

17 camels

Comparing the solutions to the 35- and 17-camel inheritance puzzles

First published in Brazil in 1949, O Homem que Calculava is a series of tales in the style of the Arabian Nights, but revolving around mathematical puzzles and curiosities. The book is ostensibly a translation by Brazilian scholar Breno de Alencar Bianco of an original manuscript by Malba Tahan, a thirteenth-century Persian scholar of the Abbasid Caliphate – both equally fictitious.

The first two chapters tell how Hanak Tade Maia was traveling from Samarra to Baghdad when he met Beremiz Samir, a young lad from Khoy with amazing mathematical abilities. The traveler then invited Beremiz to come with him to Baghdad, where a man with his abilities will certainly find profitable employment. The rest of the book tells of various incidents that befell the two men along the road and in Baghdad. In all those events, Beremiz Samir uses his abilities with calculation like a magic wand to amaze and entertain people, settle disputes, and find wise and just solutions to seemingly unsolvable problems.

In the first incident along their trip (chapter III), Beremiz settles a heated inheritance dispute between three brothers. Their father had left them 35 camels, of which 1/2 (17.5 camels) should go to his eldest son, 1/3 (11.666... camels) to the middle one, and 1/9 (3.888... camels) to the youngest. To solve the brothers dilemma, Beremiz convinces Hanak to donate his only camel to the dead man's estate. Then, with 36 camels, Beremiz gives 18, 12, and 4 animals to the three heirs, making all of them profit with the new share. Of the remaining two camels, one is returned to Hanak, and the other is claimed by Beremiz as his reward.

The translator's notes observe that the 17-animal inheritance puzzle, a mathematical puzzle whose first publication is in the works of Muhaqiqi Naraqi, is a variant of this problem, with 17 camels to be divided in the same proportions. It is found in hundreds of recreational mathematics books, such as those of E. Fourrey (1949) and G. Boucheny (1939). However, the 17-camel version leaves only one camel at the end, with no net profit for the estate's executor.

At the end of the book, Beremiz uses his abilities to win the hand of his student and secret love Telassim, the daughter of one of the Caliph's advisers. (The caliph mentioned is Al-Musta'sim, the only real character who appears fictitiously; the time period ends with the Abbasid dynasty's collapse.)

In the last chapter we learn that Hanak Tade Maia and Beremiz eventually moved to Constantinople following the Siege of Baghdad (Telassim's father died in the fighting), where Beremiz had three sons and Hanak visits him often.

== Publishing history ==
The "translator's note" signed "B. A. Bianco" is dated from 1965. The preface signed "Malba Tahan" is dated "Baghdad, 19 of the Moon of Ramadan of 1321" (Islamic calendar equivalent of (Gregorian) 8 December 1903).

The 1993 English edition published by W.W. Norton & Co. was illustrated by Patricia Reid Baquero.

The fifty fourth printing by Editora Record (2001; in Portuguese) contains 164 pages of Malba Tahan's text, plus 60 pages of notes and historical appendices, commented solutions to all the problems, a glossary of Arabic terms, alphabetical index, and other material.

The book was translated into Arabic in 2005 by Azza Kubba, an Iraqi from Baghdad (published by Al-Jamel Publishing House, Cologne, Germany).
