= Michel Honoré Bounieu =

French painter (1740–1814)

Michel Honoré Bounieu (1740–1814) was a French painter of historical and genre subjects, and a mezzotint engraver.

== Life ==
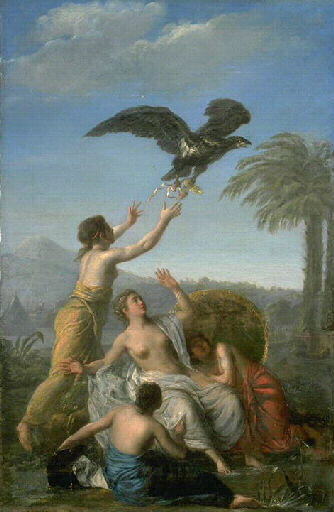
Enlèvement du soulier de Rodope, formerly known as Les femmes se baignant au bord de la rivière or Baigneuses turques (Musée des Beaux-Arts de Bordeaux)

Bounieu was born at Marseilles in 1740. He was a pupil of Jean-Baptiste Marie Pierre, and became a member of the Academy at Paris in 1767. He was keeper of the prints at the Bibliothèque Nationale from 1792 to 1794, and for the next twenty years professor of drawing at the École des Ponts-et-Chaussées. He exhibited many pictures at the Salon, and at his own studio those of Adam and Eve after their expulsion from Paradise, and Bathsheba, the former of which he himself engraved. The Musée des Beaux-Arts de Bordeaux has a Head of a Woman, and a Baigneuses by him. He died in Paris in 1814, leaving a daughter, Emilie Bounieu, later Madame Raveau, who inherited her father's talent, and exhibited historical subjects and portraits from 1800 to 1819.

== Prints ==
Bounieu engraved about fifteen subjects from his own designs. They include:

- Adam and Eve after their expulsion from Paradise.
- The Magdalen.
- Love led by Folly.
- The Punishment of a Vestal.
- The Birth of Henry IV; an allegory.
- The Deluge.
- The Odalisque.
