= The Scarlet Professor =

Opera by the Eric Sawyer

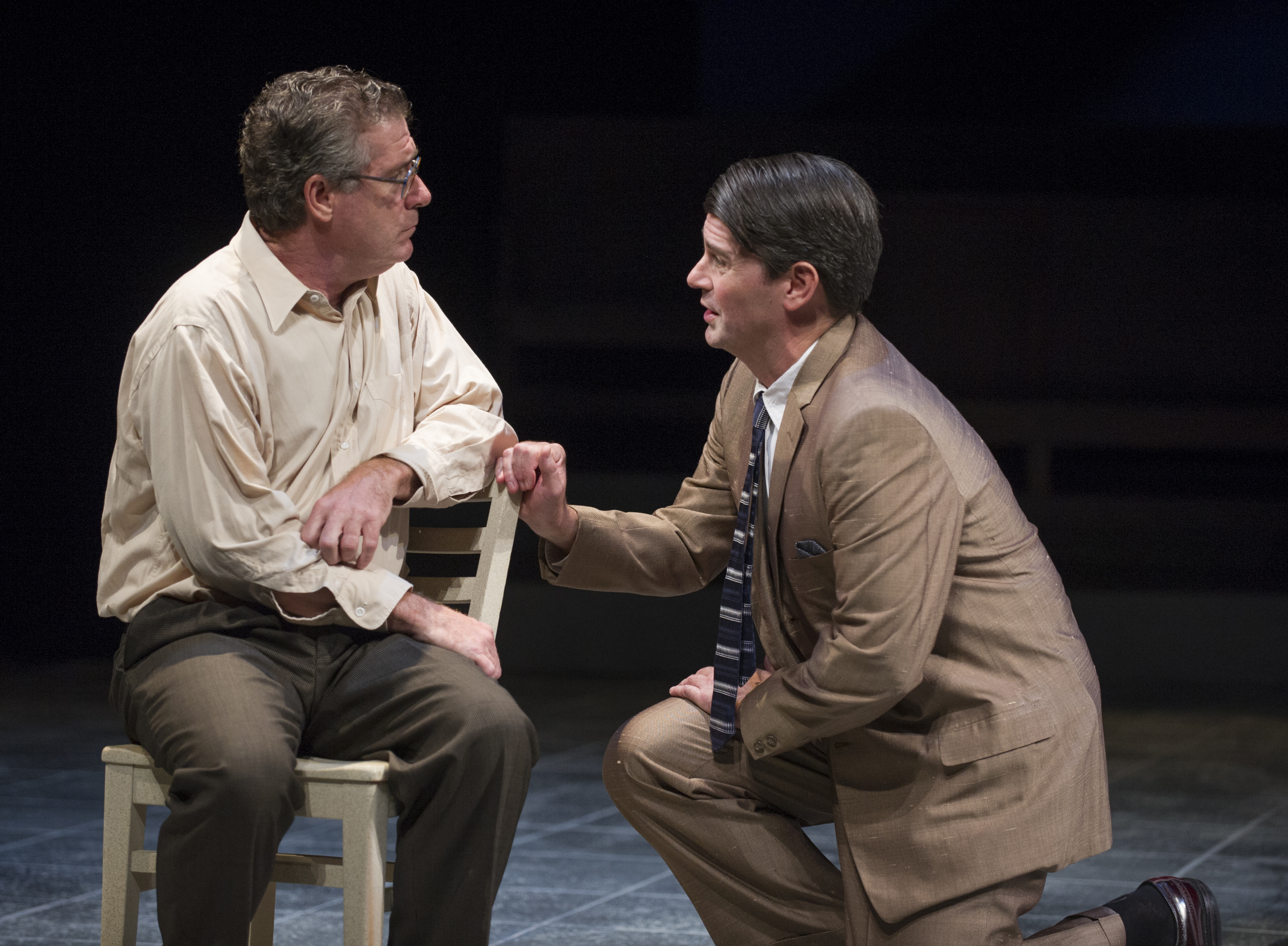
Ned Spofford (William Hite) with Newton Arvin (Keith Phares) in a scene from The Scarlet Professor

The Scarlet Professor is an opera by the American composer Eric Sawyer with libretto by Harley Erdman, based on the biography by Barry Werth.

== Performance history ==
The world premieres of the fully staged opera occurred on September 15–17, 2017, at Smith College where the events that inspired the performance took place. The opera was performed without intermission with running time of about one hour and 40 minutes. A symposium on the Arvin case was held all day on September 16. The following weekend the opera was performed with a cast of young artists from the Five Colleges consortium of Western Massachusetts.

== Roles ==
Role	Voice type	Premiere cast, 15 September 2017 Conductor: Eduardo Leandro
Newton Arvin	tenor	William Hite
Ned Spofford	baritone	Keith Phares
Hester Prynne	mezzo-soprano	Blythe Gaissert
Helen Bacon	soprano	Sarah Pelletier
Truman Capote	countertenor	Bryan Pollock
Officer Regan	baritone	James Dernier
Doctor	soprano	Kristen Watson
Arthur Summerfield	baritone	Sumner Thompson

== Instrumentation ==
The 9-piece instrumental ensemble consisted of piano, percussion, flute, clarinet, tenor saxophone, and strings, with both electric and double bass.

== Reception ==
Reviewer Marvin J. Ward found the opera a "compelling and captivating work", adding "...composer Eric Sawyer has a penchant for choosing historical events, especially local ones, as the subjects of his operas. This is the third that I have seen, each more polished and refined than its predecessor, with The Scarlet Professor scoring a 10/10 in my book." The Scarlet Professor won the 2019 American Prize in opera composition.
