= Our American Cousin (opera) =

Opera by Eric Sawyer

Our American Cousin is a 2008 opera in three acts by American composer Eric Sawyer with libretto by poet John Shoptaw. The opera depicts the assassination of Abraham Lincoln from the standpoint of the actors presenting Tom Taylor's play of the same name at Ford's Theatre at the end of the American Civil War. It aims to offer something new in the realm of American contemporary opera, an American myth told in an unfamiliar way, with both poetic and musical language drawing from the past but refracted through the present.

The opera's narrative is the collaborative invention of Shoptaw and Sawyer, freely imagined within the framework of the documented historical event and adapted plot of the original comedy. Its three acts comprise the backstage events prior to the play, the play itself, and the rupture of the stage drama by the assassination and its aftermath.

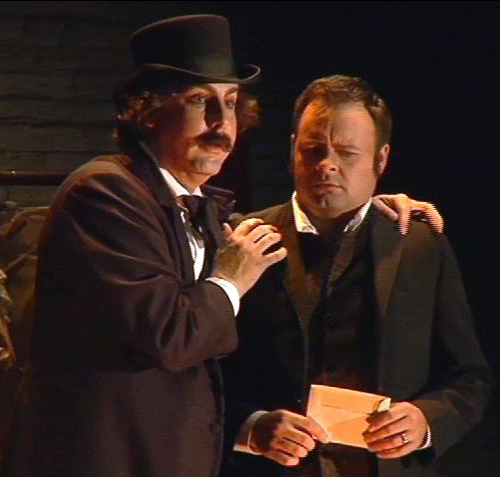
John Wilkes Booth (Tom O'Toole) and Jack Matthews (Aaron Engebreth) in a scene from Our American Cousin

== Performance history ==
The world premiere of the fully staged opera occurred on June 20, 2008, in Northampton, Massachusetts, at the Academy of Music Theater, the city's 800-seat 1892 opera house, one of the oldest municipally owned theaters in the nation and not unlike Ford's Theatre. The performance featured the Boston Modern Orchestra Project conducted by Gil Rose. Principal performers included Janna Baty as Laura Keene, Drew Poling as Ned Emerson, Alan Schneider as Harry Hawk, Aaron Engebreth as Jack Matthews, and Tom O'Toole as John Wilkes Booth. Stage direction was by Carole Charnow, general director of Opera Boston.

The opera had been previously performed in a concert version on March 31, 2007, at Amherst College in Amherst, Massachusetts, with the same principals as above along with the Amherst College Concert Choir.

== Recording ==
A recording of the opera was released in 2008 on the BMOP/Sound label by the Boston Modern Orchestra Project. In a review of the CD Robert Carl noted "...this is one of the freshest, most ambitious new American operas I've heard in ages. Instead of taking up once again some cinematic or literary retread, it actually dares to use original material. And it also dares to take up historical events and musical tropes without succumbing to mere costume drama… I appreciate, admire, and enjoy Sawyer's voice. And I hope this is only the first of Shoptaw's librettos. As a first collaboration, the result is stunning."

== Roles ==
Role	Voice type	Premiere cast, 20 June 2008 Conductor: Gil Rose
Laura Keene (Mary Trenchard)	mezzo-soprano	Janna Baty
Harry Hawk (Asa Trenchard)	tenor	Alan Schneider
Jack Matthews (John Coyle)	baritone	Aaron Engebreth
Ned Emerson (Lord Dundreary)	baritone	Drew Poling
President Abraham Lincoln	baritone	Donald Wilkinson
Mary Lincoln	soprano	Angela Gooch
John Wilkes Booth	baritone	Tom O'Toole
Lady Mountchessington	mezzo-soprano	Janice Edwards
Gussie Mountchessington	soprano	Hillarie O'Toole
Doctor Leale	baritone	Daniel Kamalic
Director		Carole Charnow
Costume designer		Nancy Leary
Scenic and lighting designer		Christopher Ostrom
Chorus master		Mallorie Chernin

== Synopsis ==
=== Act 1 ===
As the cast of the comic play Our American Cousin assembles backstage, aging actor Ned Emerson spins out a comparison of theater to war, while leading man Harry Hawk broods over a letter informing him of the death of a friend he hired to be his substitute in battle. Character villain Jack Matthews banters with John Wilkes Booth, who appears backstage to present him with a sealed letter announcing news "that has not come to pass." Knowing Booth has concocted violent and subversive scenes in the past, an alarmed Matthews hides the letter in his pocket. As they arrive, groups of theatergoers give voice to their thoughts, while backstage a last-minute rehearsal erupts into a scuffle just as the company manager/leading lady Laura Keene enters to deliver a stern admonishment to the actors. At the sound of "Hail to the Chief" Keene walks onstage to welcome Abraham and Mary Lincoln, exhorting the audience to put war behind them and forget their cares for the evening of entertainment.

=== Act 2 ===
As the theater curtain rises on an English country estate, Mary Dundreary (Laura Keene) is helping her forgetful father, Lord Dundreary (Ned Emerson), to locate a misplaced letter, which turns out to be from a backwoods American cousin, Asa Dundreary (Harry Hawk), announcing his imminent visit to Dundreary Manor to settle some "ancient business." Overhearing news of the visit of a presumably wealthy American, Lady Mountchessington schemes with her daughter Gussy to secure Asa's hand in marriage. Arriving as if on cue, Asa confounds the pair with a coarse tale of "herding possum" on the frontier. Abraham Lincoln laughs heartily at the frontiersman's mannerisms, so comically resonant with his own public persona. The villainous Solicitor Coyle (Jack Matthews) informs Lord Dundreary that he now holds the deed to the family estate, and that only his daughter's hand in marriage will forestall ruin. As the family assembles for dinner, Asa is smitten with Mary Dundreary and instantly detects Coyle's plans. The rivals jockey for seats at a lavish dinner table as underfed soldiers from the theater audience look on with indignation.

=== Act 3 ===
As Mary Dundreary leads an adoring Asa on a tour of her modern dairy, Asa spins a yarn of a deathbed bequest by his stepfather of sufficient money to save the Dundreary estate. Mary rushes off to tell her father of their salvation. Conversing quietly in their box, Abraham and Mary Lincoln look to their future after the presidency, while Booth, outside, rehearses for the assassination. Asa encounters the still eager Mountchessingtons, and having sacrificed his fortune to save the estate, declares himself penniless. As they escape from Asa's comic scorns, a shot is heard. Booth leaps from the presidential box and wields a knife at the paralyzed Hawk before fleeing. While the actors attempt to continue the play, Laura Keene tries to calm the crowd, which instead erupts calling for mercy and justice. Within the presidential box, Mary prepares for a life of mourning while a surgeon tends to Lincoln. Laura Keene, seeing the dying President lying on the bare floor, takes his head on her lap and cradles it. Matthews remembers Booth's letter in his pocket, and he and Hawk set fire to it just as the police arrive to arrest them for questioning. While Laura Keene is left to wander the stage wondering the value of her life in the theater, a shadowy figure approaches to ask her when the play will resume. Recognizing Lincoln in the figure, Keene exclaims "Don't you really know what happened?" Upon Lincoln's silence, the audience chorus give a cryptic reply in the form of a recitation of the names of Civil War battlegrounds.
