= Jean-Louis Lefebvre de Cheverus =

French cardinal (1768–1836)

His Eminence Jean-Louis Lefebvre de Cheverus
- Archbishop of Bordeaux
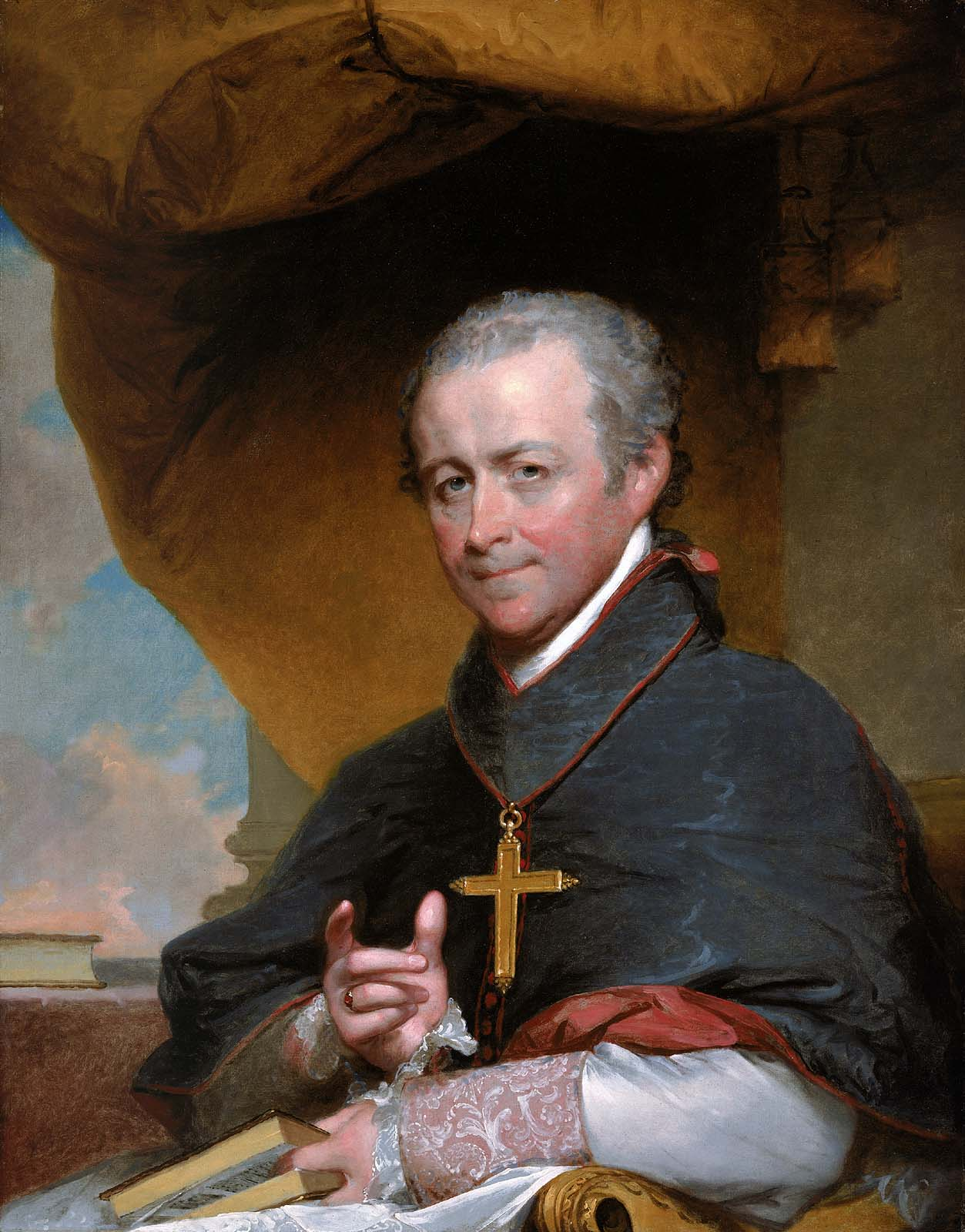
- Portrait of Jean-Louis Lefebvre de Cheverus (1823)
- Church: Roman Catholic Church
- Archdiocese: Archdiocese of Bordeaux
- In office: 30 July 1826 to 19 July 1836
- Predecessor: Charles-François d'Aviau Du Bois de Sanzay
- Successor: François Donnet
- Other posts: Bishop of Montauban (1823–1826); Bishop of Boston (1808–1823)

Orders
- Ordination: 18 December 1790
- Consecration: 1 November 1810 by John Carroll
- Created cardinal: 1 February 1836 by Pope Gregory XVI

Personal details
- Born: Jean-Louis Anne Madelain Lefebvre de Cheverus; 28 January 1768 Mayenne, Maine, France
- Died: 19 July 1836 (aged 68) Bordeaux, France
- Buried: Bordeaux Cathedral; 44°50′15.93″N 0°34′40.55″W
- Denomination: Roman Catholic
- Parents: John Vincent Marie Lefebvre de Cheverus & Ann Lemarchand des Noyers
- Education: College of Louis le Grand; Seminary of Saint-Magloire

Jean-Louis Anne Madelain Lefebvre de Cheverus (also known as John Cheverus; 28 January 1768 – 19 July 1836) was a French-born Catholic prelate who served as the first bishop of Boston. He later served as bishop of Montauban and archbishop of Bordeaux, both in France. He was elevated to the cardinalate in 1836.

== Early life ==
John Cheverus was born on 28 January 1768, in Mayenne, then in the ancient Province of Maine in France. His father, John Vincent Marie Lefebvre de Cheverus, was the general civil judge and lieutenant of police in Mayenne. His mother, Ann Lemarchand des Noyers, provided John Cheverus with his early education and inspired his devotion to the Catholic Church. By age 11, he had decided to become a priest.

John Cheverus attended primary and secondary schools in Mayenne. He received his tonsure, a special haircut, at age 12, signifying his entrance into a religious order. Cheverus was named the commendatory prior of Torbechet while still a youth.

Cheverus entered the College of Louis le Grand in Paris in 1781. He completed his theological studies at the Seminary of Saint-Magloire in Paris. Cheverus was ordained a deacon in October 1790.

== Priesthood ==
=== France & UK ===
At age 22, Cheverus was ordained a priest in Paris for the Diocese of LeMans on 18 December 1790. After his ordination, the diocese named him canon of the cathedral of Le Mans. He was also assigned as vicar to assist his uncle, the pastor of Mayenne. When his uncle died in 1792, Cheverus succeeded him as pastor. However, his time as pastor in Mayenne was short-lived.

As a result of the French Revolution, which started in 1789, the revolutionary authorities in Mayenne demanded in 1792 that Cheverus pledge allegiance to the new regime. After he refused to take the oath, they placed him under house arrest at the Cordeliers Convent in Mayenne. Wearing a disguise, he escaped the convent, fleeing to the United Kingdom. Offered financial aid on his arrival, Cheverus asked that it be given to clergy in greater need, saying:

"The little I have will suffice until I learn something of the language. Once acquainted with that, I can earn my living by manual labor, if necessary".

After three months in London, Cheverus was teaching French and mathematics. Within a year, he was ministering to a new congregation. In 1795, Cheverus received a letter from Reverend François Matignon, a former professor at a seminary in Orléans. Now residing in the new United States, Matignon was the administrator for the Archdiocese of Baltimore of all the Catholic parishes and missions in New England. He urged Cheverus to come to Massachusetts; he arrived in Boston on 3 October 1796.

=== United States ===
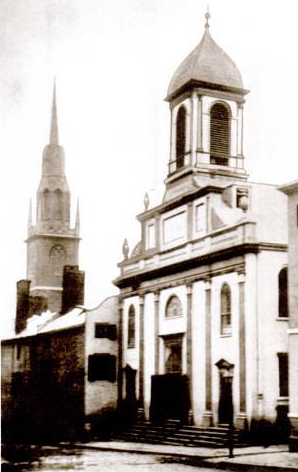
Church of the Holy Cross, Boston (1850s)

After arriving in Boston, Cheverus encountered strong anti-Catholic sentiments in all levels of society. He began working to change public attitudes toward Catholics and started preaching in public. His sermons were soon attracting many Protestant listeners. Archbishop John Carroll of Baltimore asked Cheverus to become pastor of St. Mary's Church in Philadelphia, but his congregants in Boston demanded that he remain there.

In 1797, Cheverus made his first trip to visit missions for the Penobscot and Passamaquoddy peoples in what is today the State of Maine, spending several months there. He would return to visit the Native American missions several times over the upcoming years. He returned to Boston from Maine in 1798 during a yellow fever epidemic. Cheverus spent long hours tending to the sick, both wealthy and poor. After the epidemic was over, Cheverus was an honored guest at a dinner held in Boston for US President John Adams.

When Cheverus started fundraising for the Church of the Holy Cross in Boston, Adams was the first contributor. Most of the funding for the church, which opened in 1803, was provided by Protestants in the city.

On 5 June 1806, Cheverus traveled to Northampton, Massachusetts, to minister to James Halligan and Dominic Daley. They were two Irish Catholic men being executed for murdering a local man. As was the custom, Cheverus preached a final sermon for the men, with them in attendance, at a local church before their hanging. His sermon included the following excerpt:

I am ashamed of the (audience) before me ... Are there men to whom, the death of their fellow beings is a spectacle of pleasure, an object of curiosity? ... But you, especially, O women! What has induced you to come to this place? Is it to wipe away the cold damps of death that trickle down the face of these unfortunate men? ... No, it is not for this. Is it then to behold their anguish, and to look upon it with tearless, eager and longing eyes? Oh! I blush for you, your eyes are full of murder!

Many of the local residents, impressed by Cheverus's speaking skills, asked him to stay in Northampton after the execution.

== Bishop of Boston ==
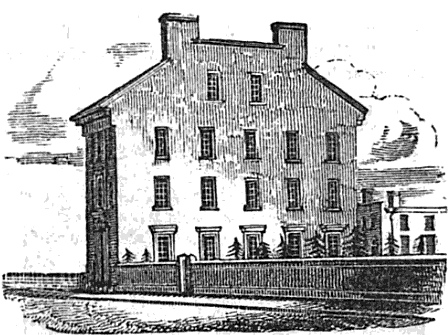
Provident Institution for Savings, Boston (1851)

On 8 April 1808, Pope Pius VII erected the Diocese of Boston, taking its territory from what became the Archdiocese of Baltimore. The pope named Cheverus as the first bishop of Boston. He was consecrated on 1 November 1810, in Baltimore, Maryland, at St. Peter's Pro-Cathedral by Archbishop John Carroll, with Bishops Leonard Neale and Michael Francis Egan serving as co-consecrators. Holy Cross Church then became the Cathedral of the Holy Cross. When Carroll died on 3 December 1815, Neale succeeded him as archbishop of Baltimore. He requested that the Vatican appoint Cheverus as his auxiliary bishop. However, when Cheverus expressed his strong desire to remain in Boston, the Vatican relented.

Cheverus supported the establishment in 1816 of the Provident Institution for Savings in Boston, the first chartered savings bank in the U.S. He believed the bank would help his parishioners establish good financial practices. In 1818, Cheverus's friend and colleague Matignon died.

In 1820, Cheverus oversaw the opening of an Ursuline convent in the rectory of Holy Cross Cathedral with a girls school for poor children. By the early 1820s, Cheverus's doctors were recommending he move to a warmer climate due to his asthma. However, he resisted their advice because he wanted to stay in Boston. In 1823, a request from King Louis XVIII persuaded Cheverus to return to his native country.

== Bishop of Montauban ==
On 12 February 1823, King Louis XVIII proposed Cheverus as bishop of Montauban in France, an appointment which Pope Pius VII confirmed on 3 May 1823. The parishioners of Boston sent a petition to the pope asking him to rescind the appointment, but it was no use. Before leaving Boston, Cheverus gave away all of his personal possessions. He left Boston for New York City in September 1823; over 300 carriages escorted him out of Boston.

During the voyage to France, his ship hit a reef in the English Channel and was temporarily grounded. After arriving in France, he traveled to Paris to have a private audience with the king before going to Montauban. His reputation as the former bishop of Boston resulted in great attention from crowds in France.Parts of Montauban were flooded in 1826, displacing hundreds of poor residents. Cheverus opened his episcopal palace to over 300 people.

== Archbishop of Bordeaux and Cardinal ==
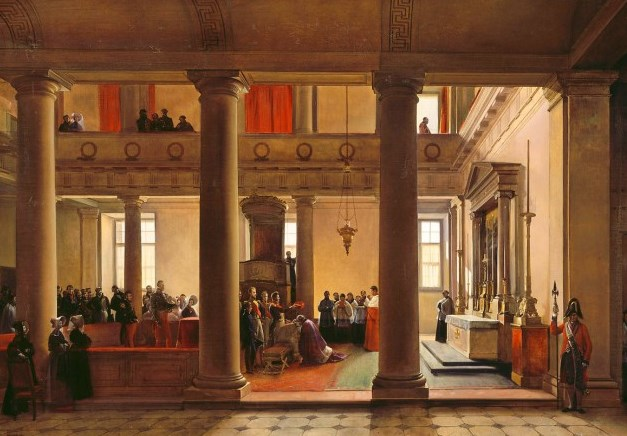
King Louis Philippe I imposes the biretta on Cheverus on March 10, 1836

King Charles X proposed Cheverus as archbishop of Bordeaux on 13 August 1826, and the appointment was confirmed 2 October 1826 by Pope Leo XII. In 1834, Cheverus suffered a stroke, limiting his physical activity. He was elevated to cardinal by Pope Gregory XVI on 1 February 1836, in accordance with the wish of French King Louis Philippe I.

According to author John Murray, Cheverus and a companion were approached by a panhandler one day in 1836 while walking on a street in Bordeaux. Cheverus, who could never refuse a request for money, gave the man one franc. "Monseigneur", said his companion "I think you have made a mistake. The man you have just given money to is a Jew." "Thank you", replied Cheverus, "It is true, I did not know it." Asking the man to come back, Cheverus handed him a five franc piece. He told his companion, "There are so few who would give him anything."

== Death and legacy ==
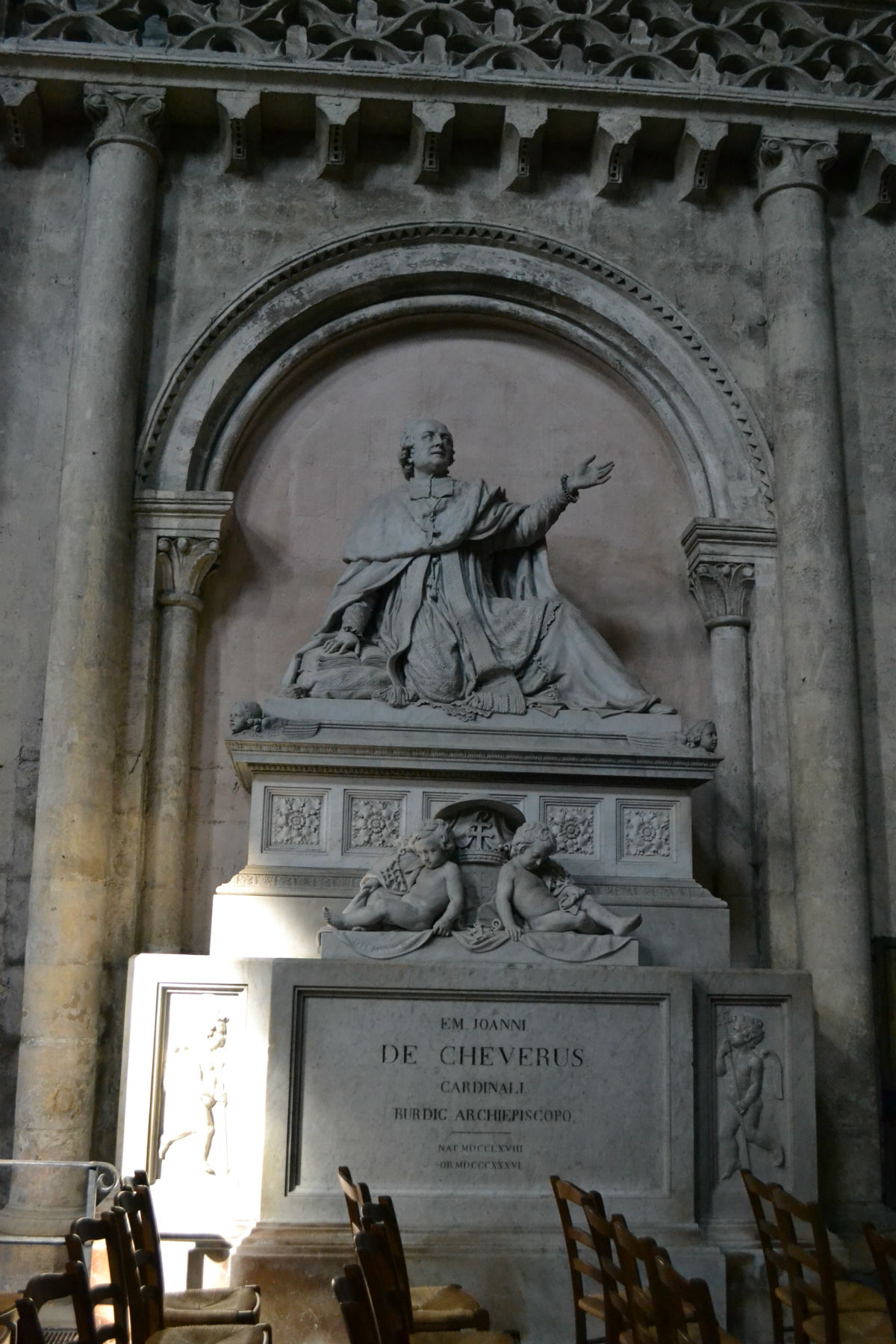
Tomb at Cathédrale Saint-André de Bordeaux

Cheverus died after suffering a second stroke in Bordeaux on 19 July 1836, at age 68. Part of Cheverus's personal library now resides in the collection of the Boston Athenaeum. He was buried in the Cathédrale Saint-André de Bordeaux where his imposing tomb may be found on the left side of the nave.

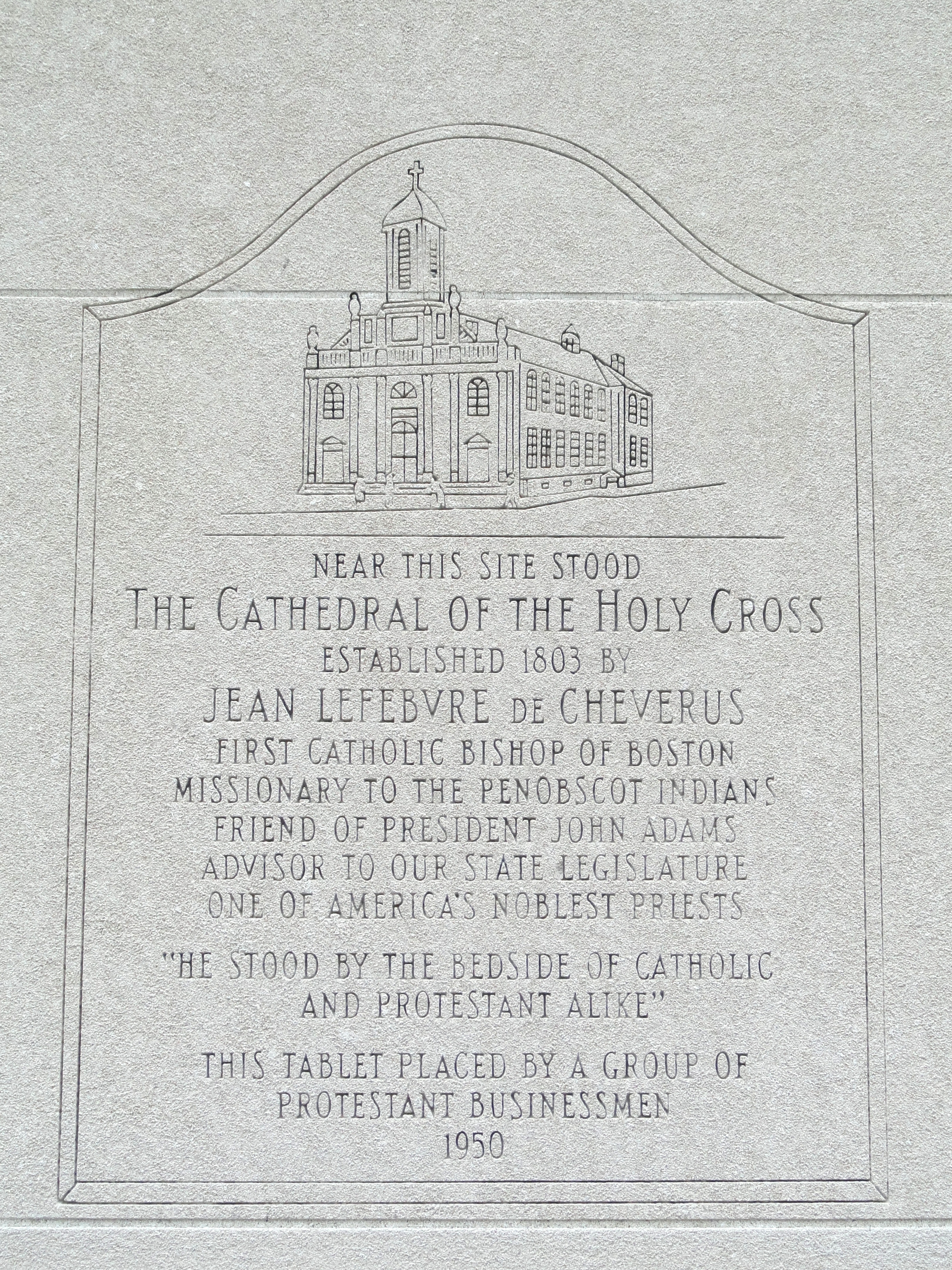
Plaque at site of Cathedral of the Holy Cross, Boston

In 1950, a plaque was mounted at the site of Holy Cross Cathedral in Boston. It reads:

Near this site stood THE CATHEDRAL OF THE HOLY CROSS, established 1803 by Jean Lefebvre de Cheverus, First Catholic Bishop of Boston; Missionary to the Penobscot Indians; Friend of President John Adams; Advisor to our State Legislature; One of America’s noblest priests. He stood by the bedside of Catholic and Protestant alike. This tablet placed by a group of Protestant Businessmen, 1950.

The following places were named after Cheverus:

- Cheverus Centennial School, an elementary school in Malden, Massachusetts
- Cheverus Hall, a student residence at Boston College in Boston
- Cheverus High School, a Jesuit college preparatory school in Portland, Maine
- Collège Cheverus, a French secondary international school in Bordeaux, France

== Popular culture ==
Cheverus is a principal character in the 2004 novel The Garden of Martyrs by Michael C. White, a fictional account of the Halligan and Daley executions. He is also a character in a 2013 opera adaptation, The Garden of Martyrs, by Harley Erdman.

== Bibliography ==
- Hamon, André (1837). Vie du cardinal de Cheverus, archevèque de Bordeaux, quatrième édition [Life of Cardinal de Cheverus, Archbishop of Bordeaux, fourth edition] (in French). Paris: Jacques LeCoffre et Cie., Libraires.
- Melville, Annabelle McConnell (1958). Jean Lefebvre de Cheverus, 1768-1836. Milwaukee, Wisconsin, USA: Bruce Publishing Company.
- "Memoir of Bishop Cheverus". Boston Monthly Magazine. 1 (1). Samuel Lorenzo Knapp: 2–21. June 1825.

Catholic Church titles
New title	1st Bishop of Boston; 1808–1823	Succeeded by Benedict Joseph Fenwick
Preceded by Jean-Armand Chaudru de Trélissac	Bishop of Montauban; 1824–1826	Succeeded by Louis-Guillaume-Valentin DuBourg
Preceded by Charles-François d'Aviau Du Bois de Sanzay	Archbishop of Bordeaux; 1826–1836	Succeeded by Ferdinand-François-Auguste Donnet
