= Barry Werth =

American author and journalist

Barry Werth is an American author and journalist. His work has appeared in The New York Times, The New Yorker, GQ, the Smithsonian, and the MIT Technology Review. He has also served as an instructor in journalism at Smith College, Mount Holyoke College, and Boston University.

Werth received a Stonewall Book Award in 2002 for The Scarlet Professor, his biography of Newton Arvin, a literary critic who was publicly forced into retirement in 1960 during an anti-pornography drive by the US Post Office. The book was later adapted into the documentary film The Great Pink Scare, and as a 2017 opera by Eric Sawyer and Harley Erdman based on Werth's book.

His book Damages is commonly used as a case study for teaching medical malpractice in law schools.

== Bibliography ==
- The Billion-Dollar Molecule: One Company's Quest for the Perfect Drug (1995)
- Damages: One Family's Legal Struggles in the World of Medicine (1998)
- The Scarlet Professor: Newton Arvin: A Literary Life Shattered by Scandal (2002)
- The Architecture and Design of Man and Woman: The Marvel of the Human Body, Revealed (2004) (with Alexander Tsiaras)
- 31 Days: The Crisis That Gave Us the Government We Have Today (2006)
- Banquet at Delmonico's: Great Minds, the Gilded Age, and the Triumph of Evolution in America (2009)
- The Antidote: Inside the World of New Pharma. New York: Simon & Schuster. 2014. ISBN 9781451655667. OCLC 859375019.

== See also ==
- Vertex Pharmaceuticals
