= The Garden of Martyrs =

The Garden of Martyrs is an opera with three acts by the American composer Eric Sawyer with libretto by Harley Erdman. It is based on the novel by Michael C. White. The opera is drawn from an historical event, covering the last days of Dominic Daley and James Halligan, Irish Catholic immigrants who were tried and executed in Northampton, Massachusetts in 1806 for the murder of Marcus Lyon.

The opera has a modern resonance of the story's theme of “immigration to America and the difficulty and suspicion with which newcomers are greeted.” The Garden of Martyrs musically dramatizes the last five days of the men's lives. The protagonist is Father Jean Cheverus, a French immigrant priest who travels from Boston to Northampton to comfort the men—even though he believes them guilty. Cheverus’ journey of transformation is the heart of the opera.

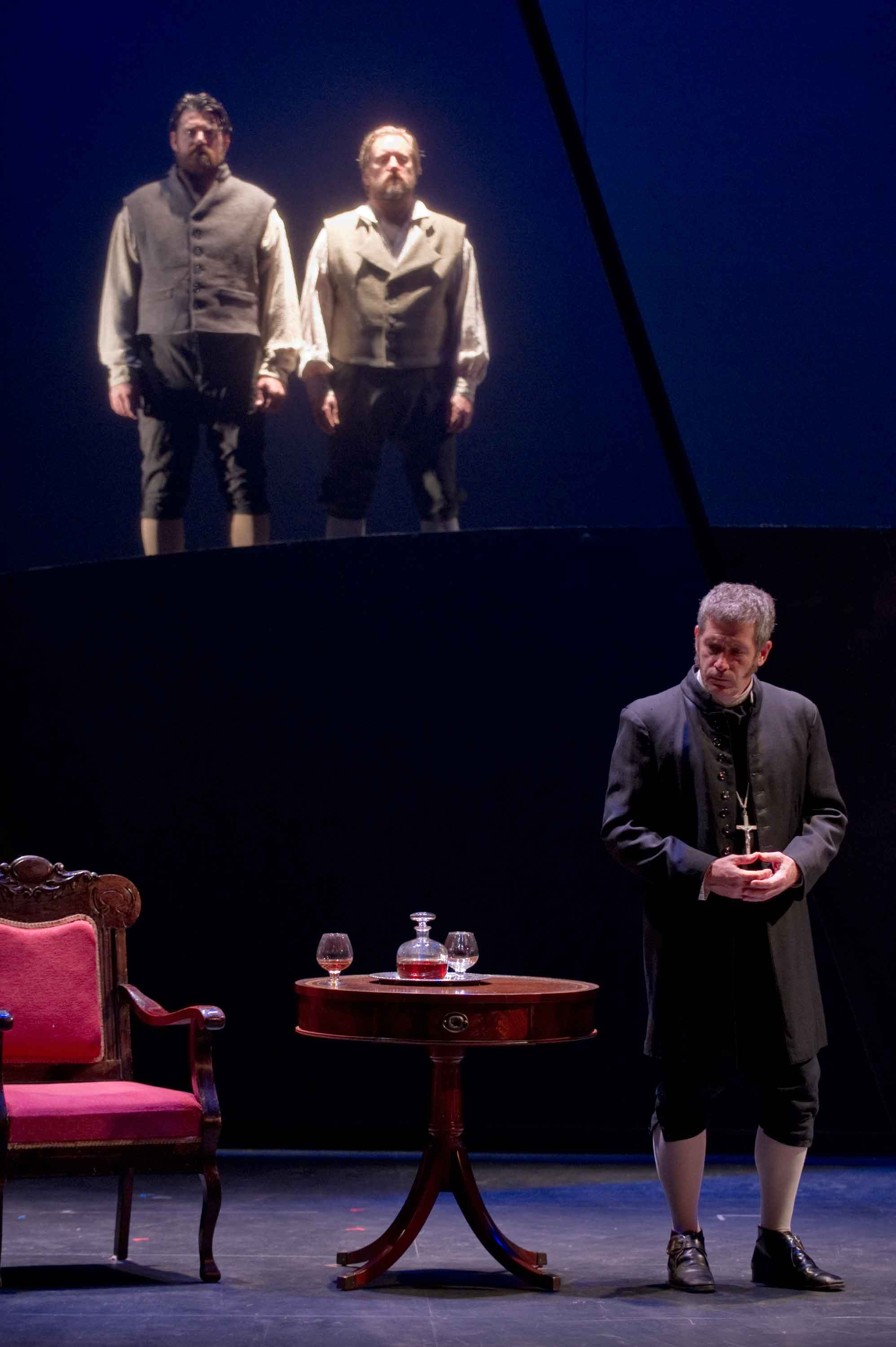
Father Jean Cheverus (William Hite) with James Halligan (Keith Phares) and Dominic Daley (Alan Schneider) in a scene from The Garden of Martyrs

== Performance history ==
The world premieres of the fully staged opera occurred on September 20 and September 22 of 2013 in Northampton, Massachusetts. The venue was the Academy of Music Theatre, an 800-seat opera house built in 1892. Both performances were sold-out. The performances featured the Springfield Symphony Orchestra conducted by Kevin Rhodes. Principal performers included William Hite as Father Cheverus, Alan Schneider as Dominic Daley, Keith Phares as James Halligan, Amy Johnson as Finola Daley and Vernon Hartman as Attorney General James Sullivan. According to music critic Clifton Noble Jr., “The audience was on its feet almost before the curtain could be raised for the curtain calls, raining down ‘bravoes’ on Sunday afternoon's sold-out performance of the new opera.”

== Historical background ==
“I am ashamed of the (audience) before me ... Are there men to whom, the death of their fellow beings is a spectacle of pleasure, an object of curiosity? ... But you, especially, O women! What has induced you to come to this place? Is it to wipe away the cold damps of death that trickle down the face of these unfortunate men? ... No, it is not for this. Is it then to behold their anguish, and to look upon it with tearless, eager and longing eyes? Oh! I blush for you, your eyes are full of murder!" —Father Jean Lefebvre de Cheverus, in his sermon prior to the execution of Dominic Daley and James Halligan

In November, 1805, a young man named Marcus Lyon was brutally murdered on the turnpike in Wilbraham, Massachusetts, near Springfield. Two Irish Catholic laborers, Dominic Daley and James Halligan, were seen near the vicinity of the crime, and apprehended. The case became a huge sensation. The men were given a hasty trial and executed in Northampton in June, 1806, before a crowd of 20,000 cheering spectators. Subsequent research has borne out a miscarriage of justice: the men were likely innocent, victims of prejudice and a rush to judgment. Daley and Halligan are now known as the “Irish Sacco and Vanzetti.” They were officially pardoned by Governor Michael Dukakis in 1984.

== Roles ==
Role	Voice type	Premiere cast, 20 September 2013 Conductor: Kevin Rhodes
Father Jean Louis de Cheverus	tenor	William Hite
Yvette	mezzo-soprano	Chrystal E. Williams
Finola Daley	soprano	Amy Johnson
Dominic Daley	tenor	Alan Schneider
James Halligan	baritone	Keith Phares
James Sullivan	baritone	Vernon Hartman
Laertes Fuller	mezzo-soprano	Dorie Goldman
Turnkey	bass-baritone	John Lemly
Bridie	soprano	Kari Lyon
The Widow Clark	mezzo-soprano	Marjorie Melnick
Young Halligan	baritone	Geoff Herrmann
Musical Director and Conductor		Kevin Rhodes
Stage Director		Vernon Hartman
Set Designer		Ed Check
Costume designer		Emily Dunn
Lighting designer		Margo Caddell
Chorus master		Mallorie Chernin
Choreographer		Wendy Woodson
Producer		Eric Sawyer

== Synopsis ==
Act One - Boston

The action opens less than a week before the scheduled execution of Dominic Daley and James Halligan, to take place in Northampton, where they have been held since the time of their arrest for the murder of Marcus Lyon. Finola Daley arrives at Father Cheverus’ Parish House. She implores Cheverus to ask Attorney General Sullivan to let him preach the public oration at the execution in lieu of the Protestant preacher the state normally appoints. Yvette, Cheverus’ housekeeper, cautions Cheverus against doing anything to provoke anti-Catholic feeling, but Cheverus has been moved by Finola. At the Attorney General's mansion, Cheverus makes his case to the dismissive Sullivan, who recounts the overwhelming evidence against the men presented at the trial, including the damning testimony of Laertes Fuller, a boy who said he saw the two men with the dead man's horse shortly after the time of the murder. Sullivan warns Cheverus against traveling to Northampton lest it be seen as an incitement to violence. Cheverus, shaken, returns home. In prayer, he reflects on his own weakness and cowardice, and resolves to go to Northampton to save the souls of these guilty men.

Act Two - Northampton

In jail, Daley and Halligan await their execution, now two days away. Daley expresses his faith in God and love for Finola. Halligan scoffs at Daley and catalogues the many girls he's known in his rakish life. Daley sings an Irish tune that conjures for Halligan the figure of Bridie, an old flame. The reverie is broken by the macabre voices of the throngs descending upon Northampton for the coming execution. Outside, the stagecoach deposits Cheverus, Finola, and her baby in the streets of Northampton. The crowds eye them suspiciously, taunting them. Night falls. Unable to find a place to lodge, Cheverus and Finola are approached by the Widow Clark, who offers them a bed for the night. The Widow expresses sympathy for the condemned Irishmen: she has heard rumors suggesting they may be innocent. Finola accepts her offer of a bed, while Cheverus, drinking from the Widow's whisky bottle, stumbles around in the meadows by the Connecticut River. Drunk and disoriented, he provokes a group of soldiers who confront him in the dark. Wounded by the soldiers, he tumbles to the ground as the act ends.

Act Three - Northampton

Dawn. The Turnkey deposits Cheverus in the jail. Cheverus offers to hear the men's confessions. Daley enumerates a list of minor sins, but, to Cheverus’ surprise, confesses nothing of the crime. Sullivan arrives to berate Cheverus for his disobedience. Finola rushes in, confronting Sullivan with suppression of evidence at the trial; what she has heard from the Widow undermines the veracity of Laertes Fuller's testimony. Sullivan grudgingly agrees to speak to the governor about “these new rumors” and departs, as does Finola. Bridie appears once more to Halligan. Cheverus breaks the reverie, and, in conversation, gains Halligan's confidence. As night falls, Halligan and Cheverus share confidences and remorse about the circumstances that caused them to come to America. Sullivan arrives with the crushing news that the appeal to the governor has been denied. Dawn arrives on execution day. The two men go in procession through the streets of Northampton to the site of their execution. Sullivan, now himself remorseful, allows Cheverus to speak the oration.

== Reception ==
The critical reception was largely positive. Clifton Noble wrote “with a superb cast, excellent chorus, and 28 members of the Springfield Symphony Orchestra under Kevin Rhodes’ direction pressed into service, Sawyer and Erdman's creation was in able hands.” Peter Bergman called Sawyer’s music “sweet and strong and sometimes stunning, as in back to the wall-knees weak stunning” with Erdman's libretto characterized as “terse and terrific.” Marvin J. Ward called it “a compelling opera, [with] the production outstanding and the performances convincing” and of “international resonance.” The opera was a prize winner in competition for The American Prize, a national award in opera composition. Among the judges’comments: "strong and grand…a stage-worthy descendant of Ward’s ‘The Crucible’ "
