= Our American Cousin =

Play by Tom Taylor

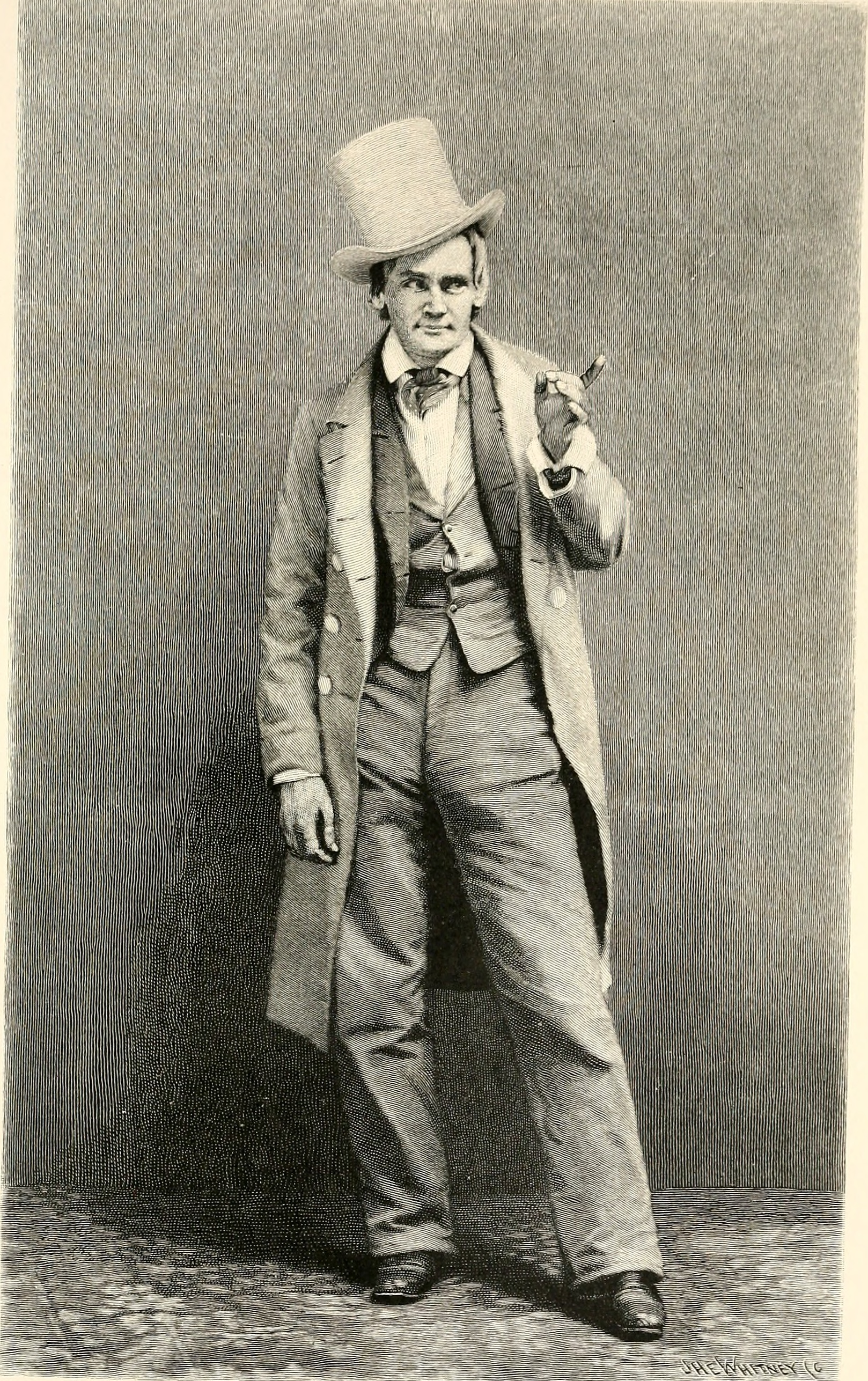
Joseph Jefferson as Asa Trenchard, the titular American cousin

Our American Cousin is a three-act comedy play by the English playwright Tom Taylor. It is a farce about an awkward, boorish American man named Asa Trenchard who is introduced to his aristocratic English relatives when he goes to England to claim the family estate. The play premiered with great success at Laura Keene's Theatre in New York City in 1858, with Laura Keene in the cast, the title character played by Joseph Jefferson, and Edward Askew Sothern playing Lord Dundreary. The play's long-running London production in 1861 was also successful.

The play quickly rose to great renown during its first few years and remained very popular throughout the second half of the 19th century. Despite achieving critical and audience acclaim throughout its production history, Our American Cousin became chiefly notorious in later years as the play that U.S. President Abraham Lincoln was watching at Ford's Theatre in Washington, D.C. when he was assassinated by John Wilkes Booth, a Confederate sympathizer and stage actor who attempted to time his gunshot with the audience's laughter on a particularly famous line.

== Theatrical acclaim and "Lord Dundreary" ==
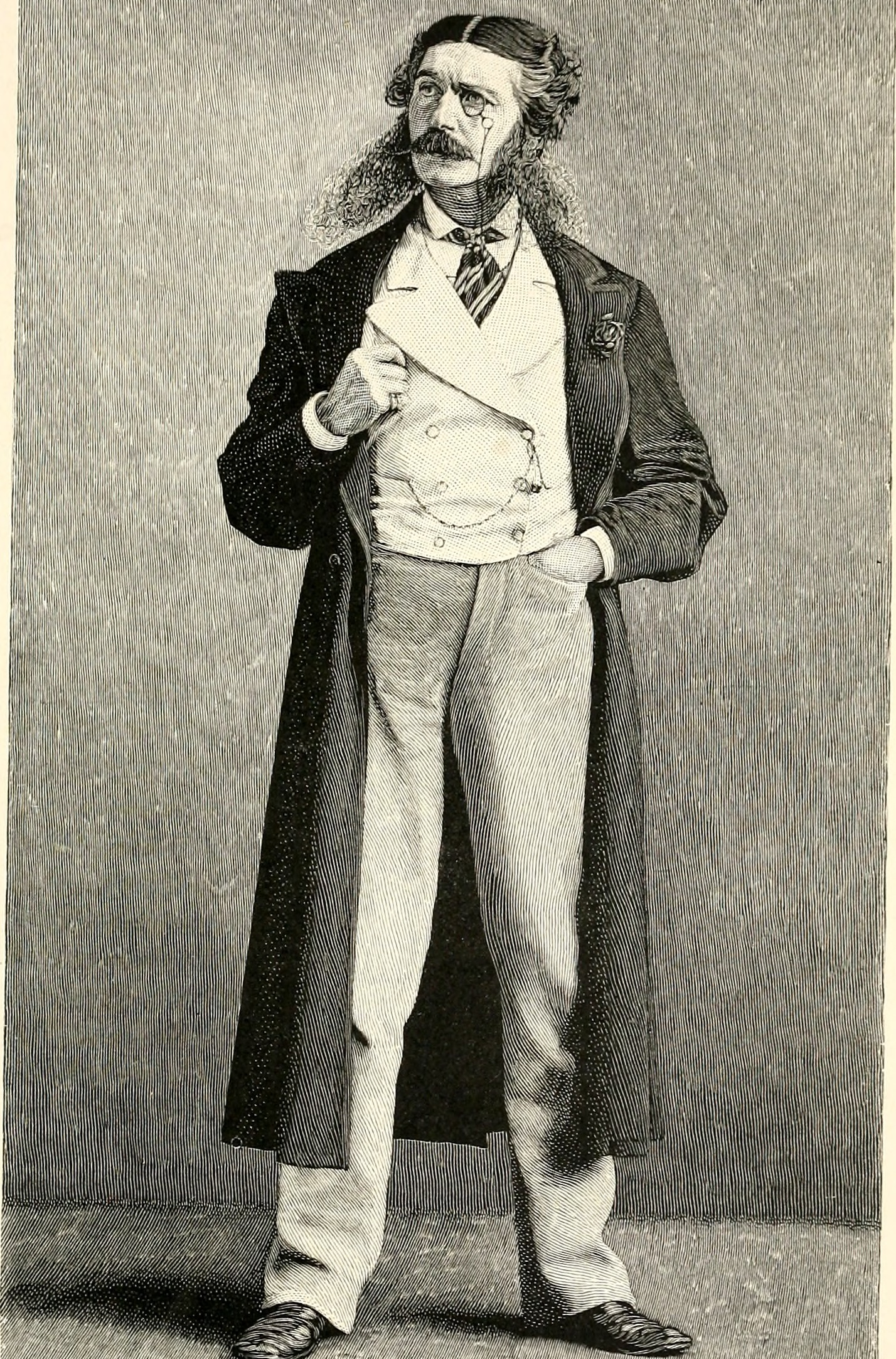
Edward Sothern as Lord Dundreary, sporting his iconic "Dundrearies"-style sideburns

Among Our American Cousin's cast was British actor Edward Askew Sothern, playing Lord Dundreary, a good natured but brainless English aristocrat. Sothern had already achieved fame on the New York stage in the play Camille in 1856, and had been reluctant to take on the role because he felt that it was too small and unimportant.

Our American Cousin premiered in New York on 15 October 1858. After several weeks of performances, Sothern began portraying the role more broadly, as a lisping, skipping, eccentric, weak-minded fop prone to nonsensical references to sayings of his "bwother" Sam. His ad-libs were a sensation, earning good notices for his physical comedy and spawning much imitation and mockery in both the United States and England. Sothern gradually expanded the role, adding gags and business until it became the central figure of the play. The most famous scene involved Dundreary reading a letter from his even sillier brother. The play ran for 150 nights, which was very successful for a New York run at the time.

Sothern made his London debut when the play opened at the Haymarket Theatre on 11 November 1861. Reviews were mixed. The Morning Post praised Sothern, but said that the play could scarcely be said to be worthy of his talents; The Athenaeum found the piece humorous and outrageous, and Sothern's performance "certainly the funniest thing in the world ... a vile caricature of an inane nobleman, intensely ignorant, and extremely indolent"; The Era thought the play "a hasty work, manufactured to suit the American market ... a sort of dramatic curiosity". The play closed on 21 December 1861 after 36 performances; after this inauspicious start it was revived at the same theatre on 27 January 1862 and ran uninterruptedly until 23 December for 314 successive performances. Sothern successfully revived the play many times, making Dundreary by far his most famous role.

"Dundrearyisms", twisted aphorisms in the style of Lord Dundreary (e.g. "birds of a feather gather no moss"), enjoyed a brief vogue. And the character's style of beard – long, bushy sideburns – gave the English language the word dundrearies. In his autobiography, writer George Robert Sims recalled that "we went Dundreary mad in '61. The shop windows were filled with Dundreary scarves, and Brother Sam scarves, and there were Dundreary collars and Dundreary shirts, and Dundrearyisms were on every lip."

It was not long before the success of this play inspired an imitation, Charles Gayler's Our Female American Cousin, which opened in New York City in January 1859. None of the characters from the original play appeared in this comedy. A number of sequel plays to Our American Cousin were written, all featuring several characters from the original, and focusing on the Lord Dundreary character. The first was Gayler's Our American Cousin at Home, or, Lord Dundreary Abroad, which premiered in Buffalo, New York, in November 1860, and had its New York City debut the following May. Later sequels included Henry James Byron's Dundreary Married and Done For, and John Oxenford's Brother Sam (1862; revived in 1865), a play about Dundreary's brother.

== Principal roles and original cast ==
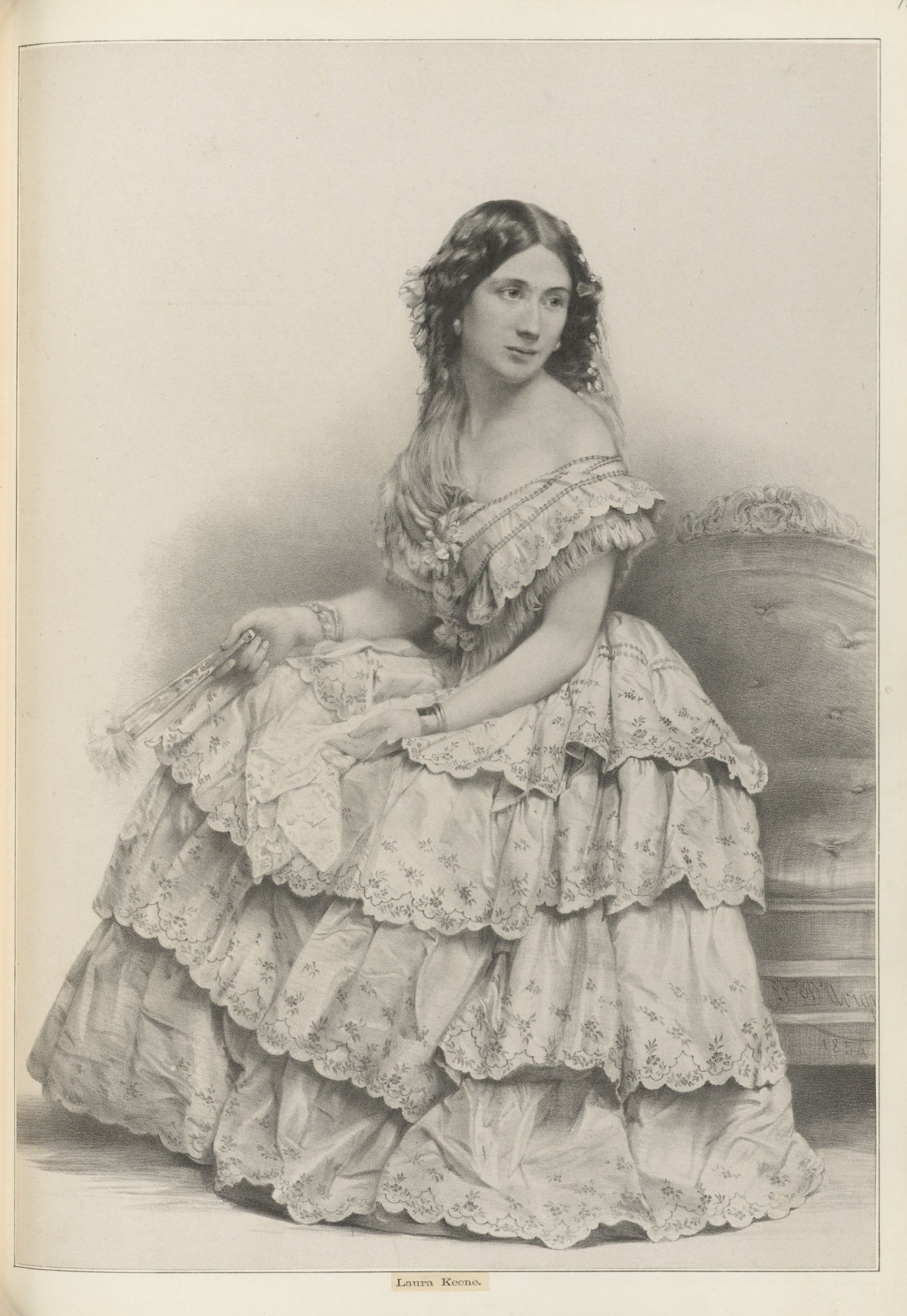
Laura Keene as Florence Trenchard

- Asa Trenchard (a rustic American) – Joseph Jefferson
- Sir Edward Trenchard (a baronet) – Edwin Varrey
- Florence Trenchard (his daughter) – Laura Keene
- Mary Meredith (a poor cousin) – Sara Stevens
- Lord Dundreary (an idiotic English nobleman) – E.A. Sothern
- Mr. Coyle (a businessman) – J.G. Burnett
- Abel Murcott (his clerk) – C.W. Couldock
- Lt. Harry Vernon (of the Royal Navy) – Milnes Levick
- Mr. Binny (a butler) – Mr. Peters
- Mrs. Mountchessington – Mary Wells
- Augusta (her daughter) – E. Germon
- Georgina (another daughter) – Mrs. Sothern

== Synopsis ==
=== Act I ===
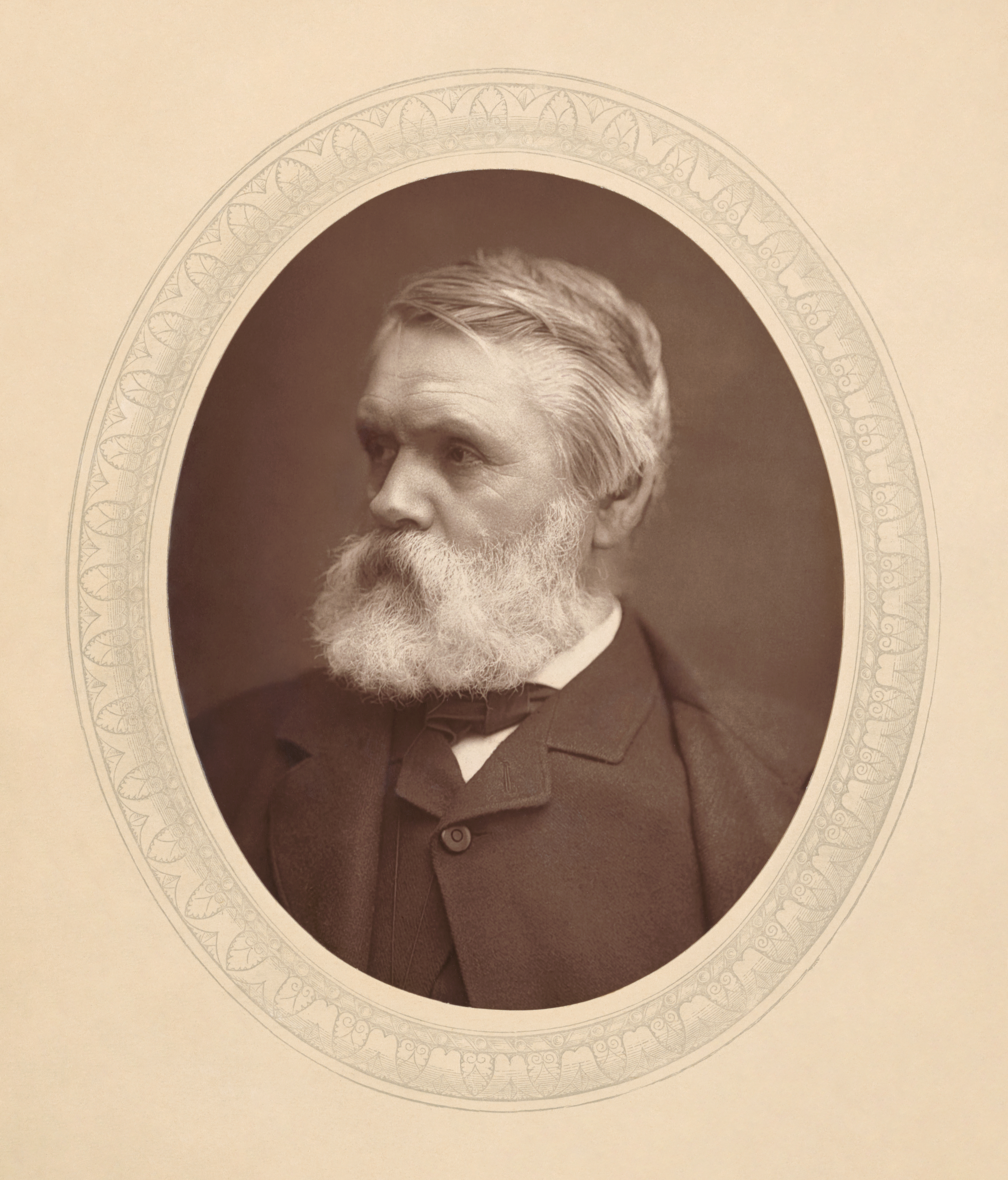
Playwright Tom Taylor

In the drawing room at Trenchard Manor, the servants remark on their employer's poor financial circumstances. Florence Trenchard, an aristocratic young beauty, loves Lieutenant Harry Vernon of the Royal Navy, but she is unable to marry him until he progresses to a higher rank. She receives a letter from her brother Ned, who is currently in the United States. Ned has met some rustic cousins from a branch of the family that had immigrated to America two centuries earlier. They relay to Ned that great-uncle Mark Trenchard had, after angrily disinheriting his children and leaving England years ago, found these cousins in Brattleboro, Vermont. He had moved in with them and eventually made Asa, one of the sons, heir to his property in England. Asa is now sailing to England to claim the estate.

Asa is noisy, coarse, and vulgar, but honestly forthright and colourful. The English Trenchards are alternately amused and appalled by this Vermont cousin. Richard Coyle, agent of the estate, meets with Sir Edward Trenchard (Florence's father) and tells the baronet that the family faces bankruptcy unless they can repay a debt to Coyle. Coyle is concealing the evidence that the loan had been repaid long ago by Sir Edward's late father. Coyle suggests that the loan would be satisfied if he may marry Florence, who detests him. Meanwhile, Asa and the butler, Binny, try to understand each other's unfamiliar ways, as Asa tries to understand what the purpose of a shower might be, dousing himself while fully clothed.

=== Act II ===
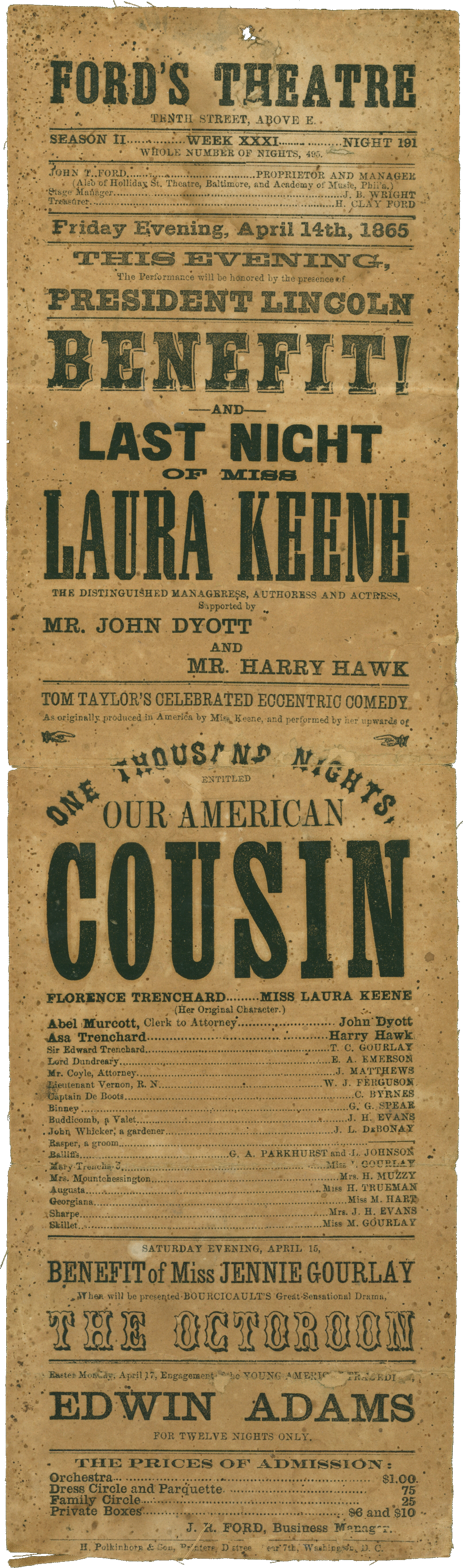
Playbill for the performance at Ford's Theatre on 14 April 1865, the day of Abraham Lincoln's assassination (possibly an early souvenir reproduction)

Mrs. Mountchessington is staying at Trenchard Manor. She advises Augusta, her daughter, to be attentive to the presumably wealthy Vermont "savage". Meanwhile, her other daughter Georgina is courting an imbecilic nobleman named Dundreary by pretending to be ill. Florence's old tutor, the unhappy alcoholic Abel Murcott, warns her that Coyle intends to marry her. Asa overhears this and offers Florence his help. Murcott is Coyle's clerk and has found proof that Florence's late grandfather paid off the loan to Coyle.

Florence and Asa visit her cousin, Mary Meredith. Mary is the granddaughter of old Mark Trenchard, who left his estate to Asa. Mary is very poor and has been raised as a humble dairy maid. Asa does not care about her social status and is attracted to her. Florence has not been able to bring herself to tell Mary that her grandfather's fortune had been left to Asa. Florence tells Asa that she loves Harry, who needs a good assignment to a ship. Asa uses his country wile to persuade Dundreary to help Harry get a ship. Meanwhile, Coyle has been up to no good, and the bailiffs arrive at Trenchard Manor.

=== Act III ===
At her dairy farm, Asa tells Mary about her grandfather in America, but he fibs about the end of the tale: He says that old Mark Trenchard changed his mind about disinheriting his English children and burned his will. Asa promptly burns the will himself, under the pretext of lighting a cigar. Florence discovers this and points it out to Mary, saying: "It means that he is a true hero, and he loves you, you little rogue." Meanwhile, Mrs. Mountchessington still hopes that Asa will propose to Augusta. When Asa tells them that Mark Trenchard had left Mary his fortune, Augusta and Mrs. Mountchessington are quite rude, but Asa stands up for himself.

Asa proposes to Mary and is happily accepted. He then sneaks into Coyle's office with Murcott and retrieves the paper that shows that the debt was paid. Asa confronts Coyle and insists that Coyle must pay off Sir Edward's other debts, with his doubtless ill-gotten gains, and also apologize to Florence for trying to force her into marriage. He also demands Coyle's resignation as the steward of Trenchard Manor, making Murcott steward instead. Murcott is so pleased that he vows to stop drinking. Coyle has no choice but to do all this. Florence marries Harry, Dundreary marries Georgina, and Augusta marries an old beau. Even the servants marry.

== Lincoln assassination ==
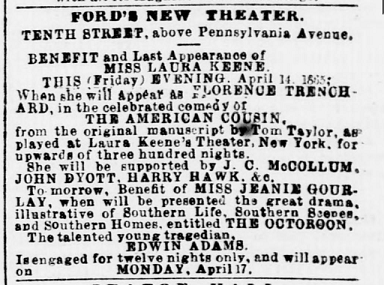
Advertisement for The American Cousin (Washington Evening Star, 14 April 1865)

The play's April 14 1865 performance at Ford's Theatre in Washington, D.C., became the most infamous in the play's history as the site of Abraham Lincoln's assassination by John Wilkes Booth. When Lincoln arrived at the theatre, the play was interrupted, and the orchestra played "Hail to the Chief" as the full house of about 1,700 rose in applause. As production resumed, the cast modified a line of the play in honor of the president: when the heroine asked for a seat protected from the draft, the reply – a pun on draft evasion scripted as, "Well, you're not the only one that wants to escape the draft" – was delivered instead as, "The draft has already been stopped by order of the President!" Halfway through Act III, Scene 2, the character of Asa Trenchard, played that night by Harry Hawk, utters this line, considered one of the play's funniest, to Mrs. Mountchessington:

Don't know the manners of good society, eh? Well, I guess I know enough to turn you inside out, old gal – you sockdologizing old man-trap!

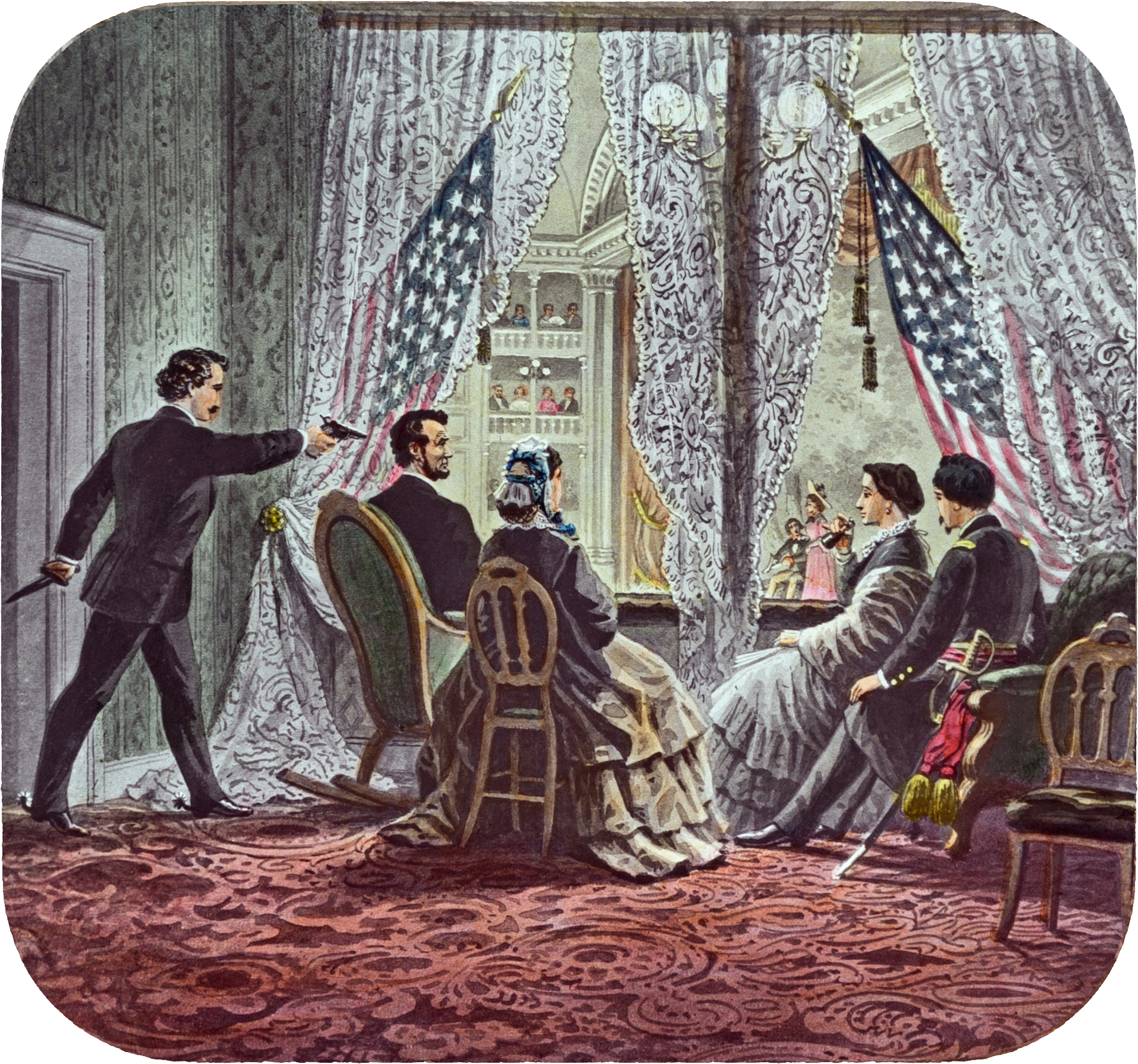
1900 drawing of the assassination during the play

During the ensuing laughter, Booth, a famous actor and Confederate sympathizer who was not part of the play's cast, entered Lincoln's box and shot him in the back of the head, mortally wounding him. Familiar with the play, Booth had chosen that moment so that the audience's laughter would mask the sound of his gunshot. Booth stabbed Major Henry Rathbone as Rathbone came at him, then leapt from the box onto the stage and made his escape through the back of the theater to a horse he had left waiting in the alley, en route stabbing orchestra leader William Withers Jr. That night, the remainder of the play was suspended. Another performance eight days later, for the benefit of the investigation into the killing, was the last performance of any play at Ford's Theatre for 103 years. Since reopening, the theatre has not restaged Our American Cousin, and has said that it never will out of respect for the assassination.

== In popular culture ==
In 1862 Charles Kingsley wrote a parody, the "Great Hippocampus Question", in the style of Lord Dundreary, and incorporated parts of this in The Water-Babies published in 1863.

Our American Cousin was adapted for the radio anthology program On Stage in 1953. In a move that earned him a rebuke from CBS management, director, producer, and actor Elliott Lewis aired it in the same hour as his show Crime Classics' episode "The Assassination of Abraham Lincoln".

In the 1961 episode of The Twilight Zone "Back There," a man travels back to April 14, 1865, and tries to prevent the assassination.

Charles Busch's 2007 play Our Leading Lady follows Laura Keene in the events leading up to and immediately after the assassination. Lynne Meadow directed its world premiere production at Manhattan Theatre Club, in which Kate Mulgrew starred as Keene.

Eric W. Sawyer's 2008 opera Our American Cousin presents a fictionalized version of the night of Lincoln's assassination from the point of view of the actors in the cast of Taylor's play.

In 2023, Tyrants, an original musical about the life of Edwin Booth, was presented at the National Archives Museum in Washington, D.C. With music and lyrics by Alexander Sage Oyen and a book by Nora Brigid Monahan, the musical's opening scene depicts the moments before the Lincoln assassination, including several lines of dialogue from Our American Cousin.
