= Portrait of Jean-Louis Lefebvre de Cheverus =

Painting by Gilbert Stuart

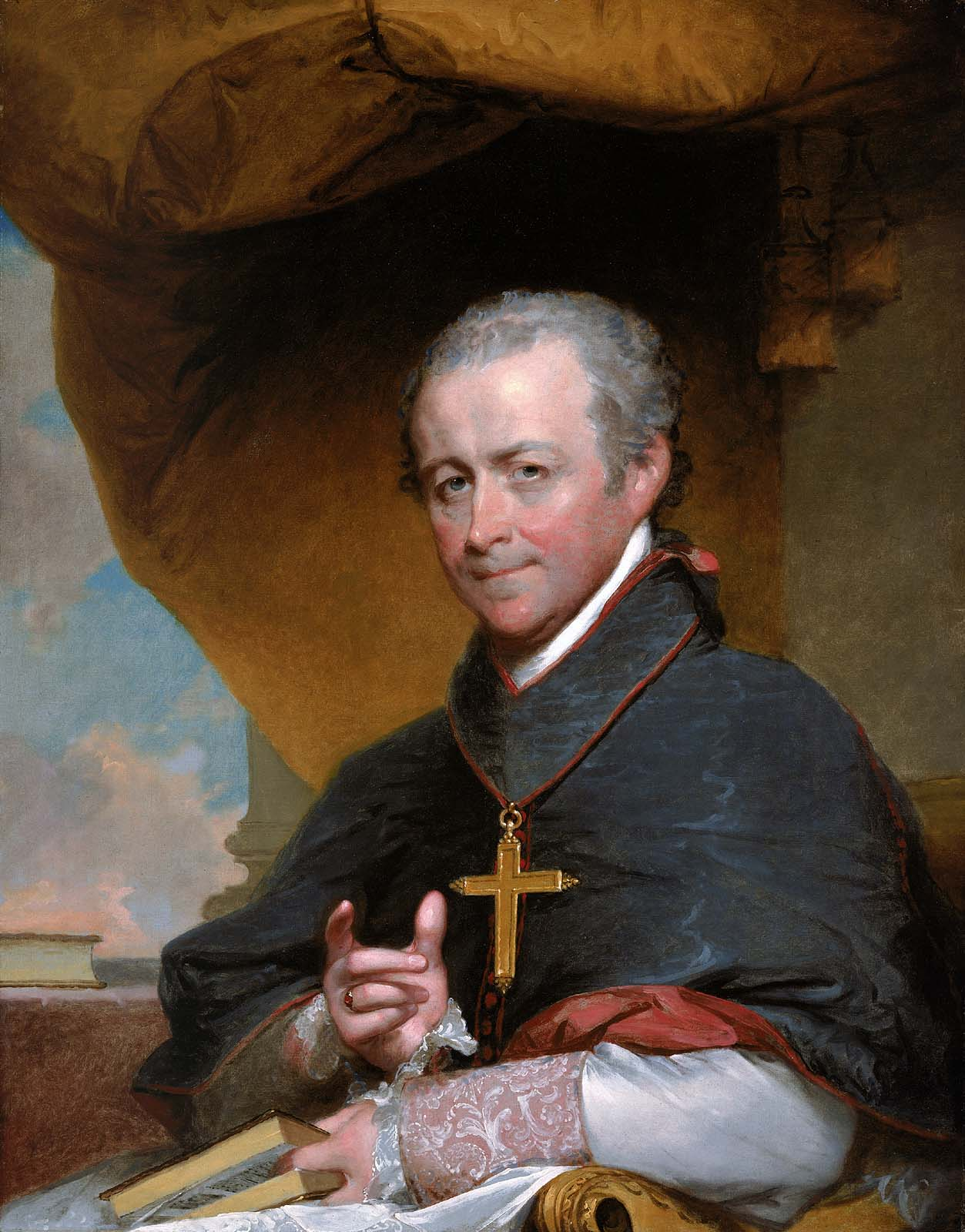
- Artist: Gilbert Stuart
- Year: 1823
- Type: Oil on canvas, portrait painting
- Dimensions: 92 cm × 72.3 cm (36 in × 28.5 in)
- Location: Museum of Fine Arts; Boston

Portrait of Jean-Louis Lefebvre de Cheverus is an 1823 portrait painting by the American artist Gilbert Stuart depicting the French Roman Catholic bishop Jean-Louis Lefebvre de Cheverus. After going into exile following the French Revolution he first lived in England before moving to America in 1796 where he rose to become the first Bishop of Boston.

The same year the portrait was painted the bishop was recalled to France, serving as Bishop of Montauban and Archbishop of Bordeaux before being made a cardinal in 1836. Today the painting is in the collection of the Museum of Fine Arts in Boston, having been acquired in 1921.

== Bibliography ==
- Barratt, Carrie Rebora & Miles, Ellen G. Gilbert Stuart. Metropolitan Museum of Art, 2004.
- McLanathan, Richard B. K. Gilbert Stuart. Abrams, 1986.
- O'Donnell, Catherine. Elizabeth Seton: American Saint. Cornell University Press, 2018.
