= Newton Arvin =

American literary critic and academic

- Born: Frederic Newton Arvin; August 23, 1900; Valparaiso, Indiana, U.S.
- Died: March 23, 1963 (aged 62); Northampton, Massachusetts, U.S.
- Resting place: Union Street/Old City Cemetery, Porter County, Indiana
- Education: Harvard University
- Occupations: Teacher, writer
- Writing career
- Language: English
- Notable works: Hawthorne; Whitman; Herman Melville; Longfellow: His Life and Work
- Notable awards: National Book Award, 1951

Frederic Newton Arvin (August 23, 1900 – March 21, 1963) was an American literary critic and academic. He achieved national recognition for his studies of individual nineteenth-century American authors.

After teaching at Smith College in Northampton, Massachusetts, for 38 years, he was forced into retirement in 1960 after pleading guilty to charges stemming from the possession of pictures of semi-nude males that the law deemed pornographic. (Note: In 2006, The New York Times described the objectionable materials as "'beefcake' magazines and pictures of men — illegal pornography then, but much of it like today's Calvin Klein underwear ads." • McFadden, The New York Times, February 20, 2006.)

Arvin was also one of the first lovers of the author Truman Capote.

== Life and career ==
Frederic Newton Arvin was born in Valparaiso, Indiana, and never used his first name. He studied English literature at Harvard, graduating summa cum laude in 1921. His writing career began when Van Wyck Brooks, the Harvard teacher he most admired, invited him to write for The Freeman while he was still an undergraduate. After a short period teaching at the high school level, Arvin joined the English faculty at Smith College and, though he never earned a doctorate, won a tenured position. One of his students was Sylvia Plath, the poet and novelist.

He taught at Smith College for 38 years and was Mary Augusta Jordan Professor of English during the year before his retirement in 1961. He rarely left Northampton for long, nor did he travel far. He visited Europe only once, in the summer of 1929 or 1930. He spent a year's leave of absence in the mid-1920s as the editor of Living Age, a weekly compendium of articles from British and American periodicals.

Arvin often wrote about political issues and took public political positions. For example, in 1936, on the day when Harvard celebrated its 300th anniversary, he joined a group of 28 Harvard graduates in an attack on retired Harvard president Abbott Lawrence Lowell for his role years earlier on an advisory Committee to Massachusetts Governor Alvan T. Fuller that found that Sacco and Vanzetti had received a fair trial. Among his co-signors were editor Malcolm Cowley and author John Dos Passos.

His first book-length publication, Hawthorne, appeared in 1929. A Guggenheim Foundation Fellowship in 1935 provided him a respite from teaching during which time he completed a biography of Walt Whitman.

In 1939 he became a trustee of Yaddo, the artist colony in Saratoga Springs, New York, where he was also a frequent writer-in-residence. There in the summer of 1946 he met and began a two-year affair with the young Truman Capote. Newton addressed him as "Precious Spooky" in amorous letters that went on to discuss literary matters. In 1948 Capote dedicated his novel Other Voices, Other Rooms to Arvin, and he later described how much he learned from Arvin saying: "Newton was my Harvard".

Arvin came to national attention with the publication in 1950 of Herman Melville, a critical biography of the novelist. It won the second annual National Book Award for Nonfiction in 1951.

Alfred Kazin thought it

the wisest and most balanced single piece of writing on Melville I have seen. It is marked not only by a thoroughly convincing analysis of his creative power and its limitations, but, what is most sharply felt in the book, a wonderfully right feeling for the burning human values involved at every point in Melville's struggle with his own nature... . He is concerned with the man's evolution in a way that leaves an extraordinary impression of concentrated sympathetic awareness.

He particularly valued how Arvin's integration of the details of Melville's biography–his Calvinist background, the mental breakdown of the father he so loved, his mother's transformation by his father's failure and early death–exposes Melville's "grandeur and weakness."

Arvin was elected a member of the National institute of Arts and Letters in 1952. Edmund Wilson wrote that of all critics of American literature only Arvin and his teacher Van Wyck Brooks "can themselves be called first-rate writers."

Though Arvin's Whitman reflected some of his leftist sympathies in the 1930s, he responded to the Cold War with renewed cultural patriotism. In a 1952 essay titled "Our Country and Our Culture", in Partisan Review, he wrote:

That period, at any rate is over, and the habit of rejection, of repudiation, of mere exacerbated alienation, has ceased to seem relevant or defensible–inevitably, since the culture we profoundly cherish is now disastrously threatened from without, and the truer this becomes, the intenser becomes the awareness of our necessary identification with it.

== Scandal ==
In 1960, the office of the United States Postmaster General (then Arthur Ellsworth Summerfield) initiated a campaign against the distribution and possession of homoerotic materials then deemed obscene. At the same time, local officials in Northampton were engaged in an anti-homosexual crusade. (See Lavender scare.) On September 2, officers of the Massachusetts State Police arrested Arvin on pornography-related charges. The police charged Arvin with "being a lewd person" and charged both him and a Smith faculty colleague, Edward Spofford, with "possession of obscene photographs." Police said Arvin led them to Spofford and that both implicated other male faculty members. Arvin, they said, admitted "displaying the photographs at his apartment and swapping them with others." Further reports specified that the pictures were of males, later revealed as issues of Grecian Guild Pictorial and Trim: Young America's Favorite Physique Publication, containing pictures of semi-nude men.

Arvin eventually pleaded guilty, paid fines of $1200, and was given a one-year suspended sentence and placed on probation.

Smith College suspended Arvin from teaching, but kept him on half salary until retirement age. Yaddo removed him from its board, but soon offered him a fellowship, though he never visited the colony again. Not long after his arrest, Arvin spent some time in Northampton State Hospital, to which he was admitted for suicidal depression.

The only other faculty member caught up in the police sweep was Joel Dorius. Newton's biographer wrote that Newton provided the police with the names of Dorius and Spofford, but Arvin's relatives (a nephew writing on behalf of himself and his mother, Arvin's sister) claimed that Arvin always denied that and said that the police obtained the names from materials found in his home. The Smith College trustees fired both Dorius and Spofford, neither of whom had tenure.

Their convictions were overturned in 1963.

Edward W. "Ned" Spofford (1931 – February 17, 2013) continued teaching literature, after his termination as professor from Smith College, at Stanford University. His publications include The Social Poetry of the Georgics.

Raymond Joel Dorius (January 4, 1919 – February 14, 2006) left the United States after the scandal and worked as a professor at the University of Hamburg in West Germany. In 1964 he returned to the United States and taught as a professor at San Francisco State University. He died of bone marrow cancer at his home in San Francisco, California, in 2006. (Note: Dorius was born in Salt Lake City, Utah, the son of strict Mormon parents who were a salesman and a teacher respectively. He studied at the University of Utah and Harvard University. In 1949 he got a job as professor at Yale University and in 1958 he became a professor at Smith College. His publications include Shakespeare's "King Henry IV, Part 1": A Collection of Critical Essays (1971), Discussions of Shakespeare's Histories (1964), My Four Lives: An Academic Life Shattered By Scandal (2004). • Heredia, The San Francisco Chronicle, February 2, 2006.)

== Death and later recognition ==
Arvin's final major publication, a study of Henry Wadsworth Longfellow, entitled Longfellow, His Life and Work, appeared shortly before his death. The New York Times headlined its review "A Tarnished Reputation Reappraised." The reputation in question was that of Longfellow. The reviewer praised its "fresh and convincing conclusions that Longfellow's best is too good to be left languishing in its present state of neglect," though he expressed dissatisfaction that Arvin "too thinly handles relationships between art and biography."

Arvin died of pancreatic cancer in Northampton on March 21, 1963, and is buried at Union Street/Old City Cemetery in Porter County, Indiana.

Truman Capote established in his will the Truman Capote Award for Literary Criticism to be awarded "in honor of the critic Newton Arvin." It has been awarded annually since 1994 by the University of Iowa. It is said to be the largest annual cash prize for literary criticism in the English language.

Friends published a collection of Arvin's essays and book reviews as American Pantheon in 1966. Among the principal authors discussed are Louisa May Alcott, Henry Adams, Emily Dickinson, Ralph Waldo Emerson, William Dean Howells, Henry James, James Whitcomb Riley, Henry David Thoreau, Mark Twain, and John Greenleaf Whittier, as well as Hawthorne, Melville, and Whitman. One reviewer, though unhappy with the book as a representation of Arvin's career, took the opportunity to summarize Arvin's contribution to the study of American literature: "He sharpened to almost unbearable precision the conflict between 'personal wholeness' and the social environment."

In 2001, Barry Werth published a biography, The Scarlet Professor: Newton Arvin: A Literary Life Shattered by Scandal. It provoked a response from Arvin's nephew that criticized its portrayal of Arvin and particularly the charge that Arvin provided names of colleagues to the police in 1960.

In the course of reviewing that biography, critic Benjamin DeMott said Arvin's "penetrating books about Hawthorne and Whitman...were trailbreaking in their time and remain readable today."

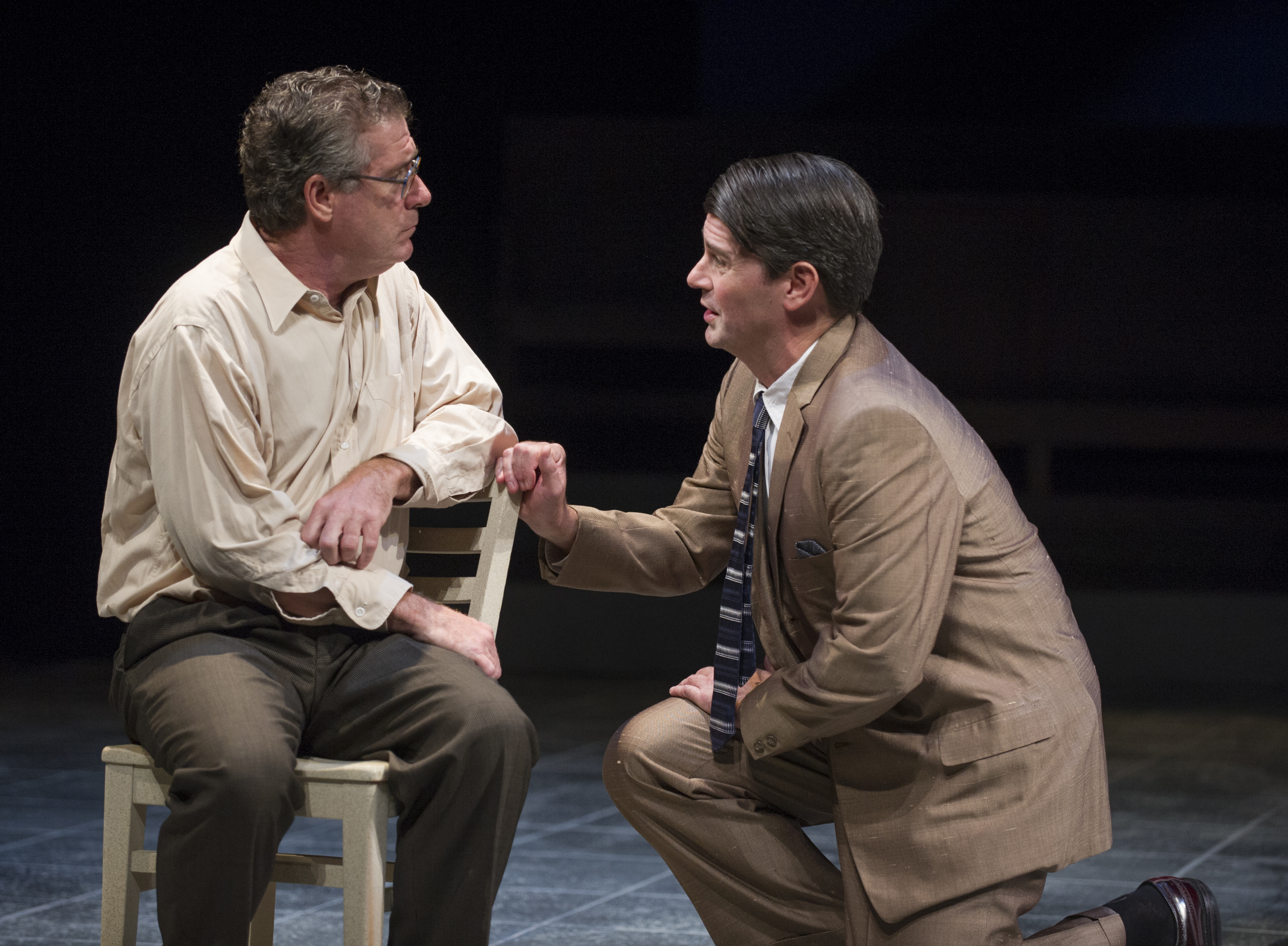
William Hite as Ned Spofford and Keith Phares as Newton Arvin in a scene from The Scarlet Professor by Harley Erdman and Eric Sawyer, 2017

Mount Holyoke College held a symposium about Newton Arvin in 2001. In 2002, Smith College established the "Newton Arvin Prize in American Studies," a student award. In 2006, an independent documentary film titled The Great Pink Scare aired on the PBS series "Independent Lens". It covers the arrests of Arvin, Spofford, and Dorius, and their subsequent careers.

The Scarlet Professor, an opera about Arvin by Eric Sawyer and Harley Erdman based on Werth's book, premiered at Smith College in 2017.

== Works ==
- Author
  - Hawthorne (Boston: Little, Brown, 1929), ISBN 1-4047-6722-3.
  - Whitman (NY: Macmillan Company, 1938).
  - Herman Melville (NY: Sloane 1950), ISBN 0-8021-3871-3.
  - Longfellow: His Life and Work (Boston: Little, Brown, 1963), ISBN 0-8371-9505-5.
  - Daniel Aaron and Sylvan Schendler, eds., American Pantheon: Essays (NY: Delacorte Press 1966).
  - "Individualism and American Writers" in The Nation, October 14, 1931.
  - "Religion and the Intellectuals" in Partisan Review, January, 1950.
  - "Our Country and Our Culture" in Partisan Review, May 1952.
- Editor
  - The Heart of Hawthorne's Journals, ed., (Boston: Houghton Mifflin Company, 1929).
  - Hawthorne's Short Stories, ed., (NY: Vintage Books, 1946), ISBN 0-394-70015-5.

== Sources ==
- Daniel Aaron, "Introduction," in Daniel Aaron and Sylvan Schendler, eds., American Pantheon: Essays (NY: Delacorte Press 1966)
- Benjamin DeMott, "The Sad Tale of Newton Arvin", The New York Review of Books, November 29, 2001
- Joel Dorius, My Four Lives: An Academic Life Shattered By Scandal (Country Press, 2004)
- Louis Kronenberger, "A Memoir," in Daniel Aaron and Sylvan Schendler, eds., American Pantheon: Essays (NY: Delacorte Press 1966)
- Barry Werth, "Newton Arvin's Yaddo," in Micki McGee, ed., Yaddo : Making American Culture (NY:Columbia University Press, 2008), ISBN 0-231-14737-6
- Barry Werth, The Scarlet Professor: Newton Arvin: A Literary Life Shattered by Scandal (Doubleday, 2001), ISBN 0-385-49468-8
- The New York Times: Wilson Follett, "Walt Whitman as the Poet of Socialism," Nov. 27, 1938, accessed December 29, 2009, book review of Whitman
- The New York Times: Lawrence Thompson, "A Tarnished Reputation Reappraised," May 5, 1963, accessed December 29, 2009, book review of Longfellow: His Life and Work
- The New York Times: Alfred Kazin, "The Burning Human Values in Melville," May 7, 1950, accessed December 29, 2009, book review of Herman Melville
- The New York Times: Caleb Crain, "'The Scarlet Professor': Search and Destroy," August 5, 2001, accessed January 5, 2010, book review of The Scarlet Professor
- The New York Times: "'The Scarlet Professor'," Aug. 26, 2001, accessed December 29, 2009, letter to the editor from Arvins's nephew
