= Harry Hawk =

American actor and comedian (1837–1916)

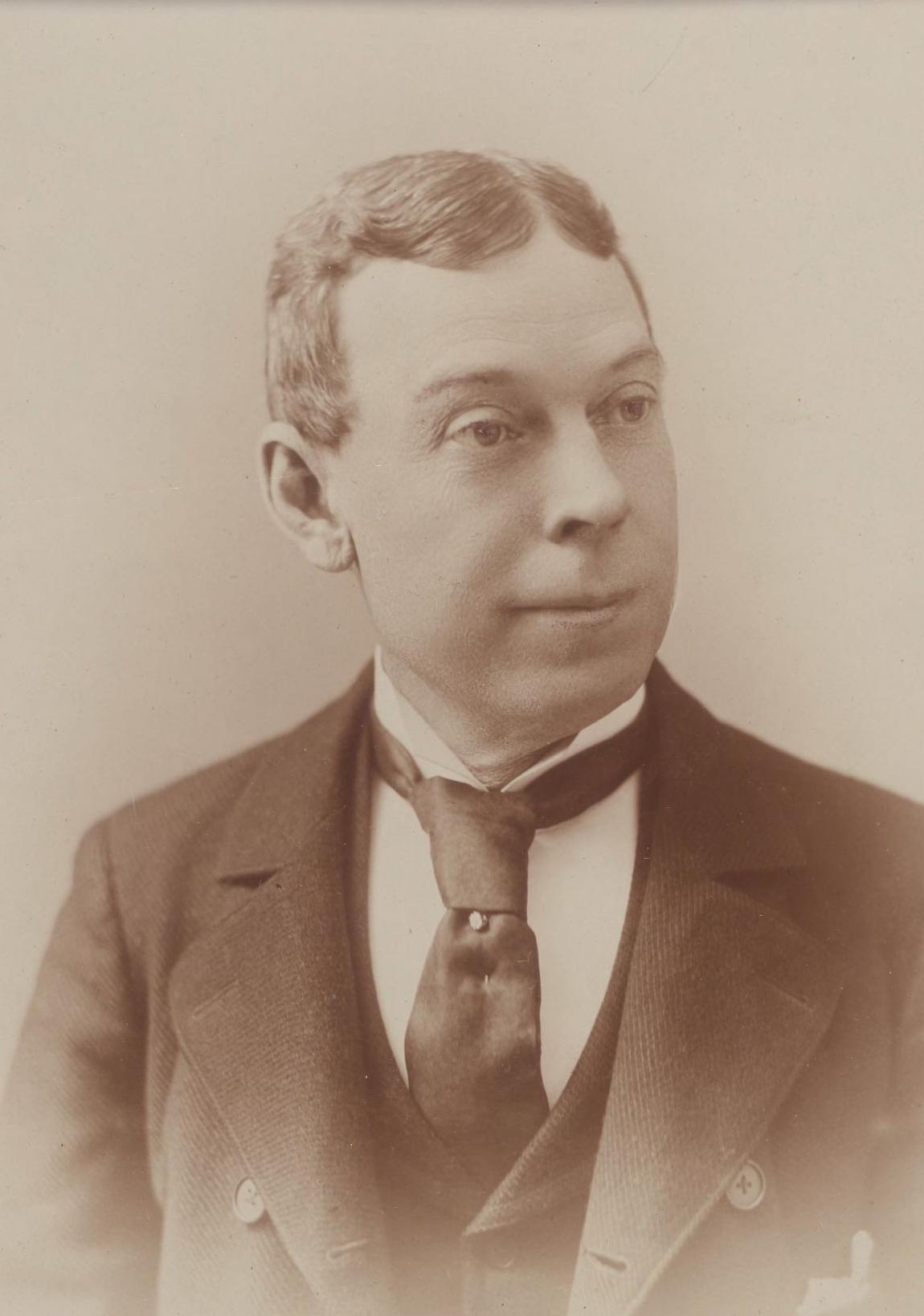
- Born: April 28, 1837; Philadelphia, Pennsylvania, U.S.
- Died: May 28, 1916 (aged 79); Jersey, British Empire
- Resting place: La Croix Cemetery, Grouville, Jersey
- Occupation: Stage actor

William Henry Hawk (April 28, 1837 – May 28, 1916) was an American actor and comedian best known for being the only performer on stage at Ford's Theatre at the moment Abraham Lincoln was shot on April 14, 1865.

== Early life ==
Hawk was born in Philadelphia in 1837 to William J. Hawk and his wife, but the family moved to Chicago when he was young. He began theater work as a call boy, or stagehand, at McVicker's Theatre in Chicago. After two years, he left to work for John E. Owens at the Variety Theatre in New Orleans. His first stage role was in 1859 in The Little Treasurer. He made his way back north with the onset of the American Civil War, and by the early 1860s he was appearing in billed roles including, for example, the role of Mark Meddle in London Assurance, and Davy in The Phantom.

== Assassination of Abraham Lincoln ==
On tour with Laura Keene's stage company in 1865, he had recently gained the title role in the company's production of Tom Taylor's play Our American Cousin, playing the role of Asa Trenchard. That role was best known for being played by popular comedian Joseph Jefferson, as part of the company Keene used to debut the play in America in 1858.

At about 10:14 pm on April 14, 1865, Harry Hawk was alone on stage in Washington, D.C., delivering what was considered one of the funniest lines of the play. "Don't know the manners of good society, eh? Well, I guess I know enough to turn you inside out, old gal; you sockdologizing old man-trap!" which was delivered just after actress Helen Muzzy left the stage. Hysterical laughter began permeating the theater, and Lincoln was laughing at this line when he was shot. John Wilkes Booth, an experienced actor, knew the line would draw much laughter, and used the opportunity to shoot, counting on the laughter to mask the report of his pistol. When Booth jumped down toward the stage, Hawk at first thought Booth was coming after him, and backed off the stage. Hawk knew Booth, and immediately recognized him.

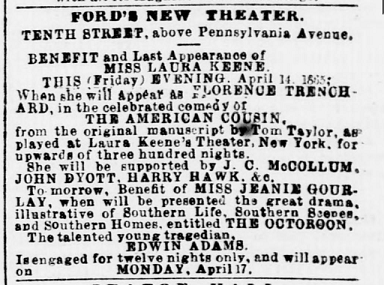
Advertisement for Our American Cousin on April 14, 1865, edition of Washington Evening Star

Hawk was detained by the police and held on a $1,000 bond, which Doctor Brown (the undertaker who later embalmed Lincoln) furnished for him. He was then brought to the Petersen House across the street from the theatre (where Lincoln lay dying), and confirmed to the police that Booth had been the assailant. Corporal James R. Tanner recorded the following testimony from Hawk:

I was on the stage at the time of the firing & heard the report of the pistol. My back was towards the Presidents box at the time. I heard something tear & somebody fell & as I looked towards him he came in the direction in which I was standing & I believe to the best of my knowledge that it was John Wilkes Booth. Still I am not positive that it was him. I only had one glance at him as he was rushing towards me with a dagger & I turned and run & after I run up a flight of stairs I turned and exclaimed "My God that's John Booth." I am acquainted with Booth. I met him the first time a year ago. I saw him today about one o'clock. Said I "how do you do Mr. Booth" and he says "how are you Hawk." He was sitting on the steps of Fords Theatre reading a letter. He had the appearance of being sober at the time. I was never intimate with him. He had no hat on when I saw him on the stage. In my own mind I do not have any doubt but that it was Booth. He made some expression when he came on the stage but I did not understand what.

Hawk wrote to his parents on April 16:

This is the first time I have had to write to you since the assassination of our dear President on Friday night, as I have been in custody nearly ever since, I was one of the principal witnesses of that sad affair, being the only one on the stage at the time of the fatal shot. I was playing Asa Trenchard, in the "American Cousin," The "old lady" of the theatre had just gone off the stage, and I was answering her exit speech when I heard the shot fired. I turned, looked up at the President's box, heard the man exclaim, "Sic semper tyrannis," saw him jump from the box, seize the flag on the staff and drop to the stage; he slipped when he gained the stage, but got upon his feet in a moment, brandished a large knife, saying, "The South shall be free!" turned his face in the direction I stood, and I recognized him as John Wilkes Booth. He ran toward me, and I, seeing the knife, thought I was the one he was after, ran off the stage and up a flight of stairs. He made his escape out of a door, directly in the rear of the theatre, mounted a horse and rode off.

The above all occurred in the space of a quarter of a minute, and at the time I did not know that the President was shot; although, if I had tried to stop him, he would have stabbed me.

I am now under one thousand dollars bail to appear as a witness when Booth is tried, if caught.

All the above I have sworn to. You may imagine the excitement in the theatre, which was crowded, with cries of "Hang him!" "Who was he?" &c., from every one present.

In about fifteen minutes after the occurrence, the President was carried out and across the street. I was requested to walk down to police headquarters and give my evidence. They then put me under one thousand dollars bond to appear at 10 o'clock next morning. I then walked about for some time as the city was wild with excitement, and then I went to bed. At half-past three I was called by an aid of the President, to go the house where he was lying, to give another statement before Judge Carter, Secretary Stanton, and other high officials assembled there. I did so, and went to bed again. On Saturday I gave bail.

It was the saddest thing I ever knew. The city only the night before was illuminated, and everybody was so happy. Now it is all sadness. Everybody looks gloomy and sad.

On that night the play was going off so well. Mr. and Mrs. Lincoln enjoyed it much. She was laughing at my speech when the shot was fired. In fact it was one laugh from the time the curtain went up until it fell — and to think of such a sorrowful ending! It is an era in my life that I shall never forget. Inclosed is a piece of fringe of the flag the President was holding when shot.

The following week Hawk was briefly arrested again in Harrisburg, Pennsylvania, but then released. He used an assumed name for a time afterward. (Note: Attributed to multiple sources:)

== Later life ==
Hawk was a friend of Booth's brother actor Edwin Booth, and generally declined out of respect to talk about the events of that night while Edwin was still living.

Hawk acted for over 40 years. He was acting in and managing Laura Keene's company when she died in 1873. Unable to keep up with the public's increasing taste for musical comedy, he fell into obscurity. By 1901 he was living in semi-retirement in the Philadelphia suburb of Ardmore. He moved to the island of Jersey in 1911, and died there in 1916. He was buried at the La Croix old cemetery in Grouville.

Hawk was portrayed in the first two episodes of the 2024 Apple TV+ miniseries Manhunt by actor Chris Mayers.
