= Dominic Daley =

Irishman executed for murder in US (c.1770–1806)

Dominic Daley (c. 1770 – June 5, 1806) was an Irishman who immigrated to America some time around 1800, and was executed for murder, in what has widely been believed to be a miscarriage of justice.

The date of Daley's birth and arrival in the United States has been lost. It is known that he lived and worked in Boston, Massachusetts. In November 1805, the body of a young farmer, Marcus Lyon, was found on the open road near town of Wilbraham, Massachusetts. Daley and a fellow Irishman, James Halligan, were traveling in the area at the time, heading for New Haven, Connecticut, when they were arrested for the murder on November 12, 1805, in Northampton, Massachusetts. Their captor was paid $500. The pair protested their innocence, but were held in prison for nearly five months, being charged with highway robbery from the assault of Lyon. They were granted defense attorneys only 48 hours before their trial. They were convicted of murder within an hour.

At their request, the Rev. Jean-Louis Lefebvre de Cheverus, the Catholic bishop of Boston, went at great personal risk to assist them in their last moments. He celebrated a Catholic Mass for them in their prison cell. This is believed to have been the first time a Catholic service had taken place in the town.

The next day, an estimated 15,000 people viewed the execution on June 5, 1806. The two Irishmen publicly forgave their accusers and the prosecutors of the case. They were then hanged. On St. Patrick's Day 1984, Governor Michael Dukakis of Massachusetts issued a proclamation exonerating Daley and Halligan.

Author John S. Bowman has said that while Daley and Halligan may have been innocent, the role of anti-Catholic and anti-Irish bias was heavily exaggerated. Their religion was never mentioned at the trial and the prosecution only made one overt reference to the defendants being Irish.

== See also ==
- List of wrongful convictions in the United States
