= James Halligan (1778–1806) =

Irishman executed for murder in the U.S. (c.1778–1806)

James Halligan (c. 1778 – 5 June 1806) was an Irishman who emigrated to America and lived and worked in Boston. He and Dominic Daley were arrested on November 12, 1805, and convicted for the murder of Marcus Lyon. Lyon's body had been found on November 10 nearby Springfield, Massachusetts. Locals had seen strangers Halligan and Daley in the same area as Lyon's body the day before, and 13-year-old Laertes Fuller testified as such before a jury of inquest. Police were sent after the pair on November 11 and arrested them the following day.

The trial for Commonwealth v. Dominic Daley and James Halligan was held in Northampton, Massachusetts. Halligan and Daley's lawyers were only given two days to set up a defense for their clients. The prosecution's main point was Fuller's testimony. The defense's lawyers had no witnesses, and the laws at the time in Massachusetts prevented the defendants from arguing for themselves. The only argument in defense of Daley and Halligan was the closing statement made by one of their lawyers, Francis Blake. Blake claimed that the men were being charged solely because of their Irish nationality, yet the jury returned with a guilty verdict in under one hour.

Jean-Louis Lefebvre de Cheverus, a priest from Boston, came to assist them in their last moments, even through great personal risk. The two were hanged on June 5, 1806. An estimated 15,000 people came to Northampton to view the execution.

The trial is now seen as a symbol of the prevalent bias against the Irish in New England at the time. On St. Patrick's Day 1984, Governor Michael Dukakis issued a proclamation exonerating Daley and Halligan.

Author John S. Bowman has said that while Daley and Halligan may have been innocent, the role of anti-Catholic and anti-Irish bias has been heavily exaggerated. The religion of the two defendants was never mentioned at the trial and the prosecution only made one overt reference to the defendants being Irish.

== See also ==
- List of wrongful convictions in the United States
