= Eric W. Sawyer =

American classical composer

Eric Sawyer
- Born: June 2, 1962 (age 64); Brookhaven, New York, U.S.
- Occupation: composer
- Years active: 1985–present
- Awards: Joseph H. Bearns Prize
- Website: http://www.ericsawyer.net/

Eric W. Sawyer (born June 2, 1962, in Brookhaven, New York) is an American orchestral composer, pianist and professor of music at Amherst College. He has studied as an undergraduate at Harvard College, where he was selected as a Harvard Junior Fellow. He undertook graduate studies at both Columbia University and the University of California, Davis (where he completed his doctorate in 1994). Before taking up the position at Amherst, Sawyer spent four years as Chair of Composition and Theory at the Longy School of Music.

== Credits ==
Sawyer has written a number of pieces that have received multiple public performances. His debut was in 1985 with Three Pieces for Orchestra, performed by the Harvard Chamber Orchestra, and was described at the time as an "auspicious beginning". Later pieces have included "String Quartet No. 2" (premiered at the Longy School of Music's "SeptemberFest" in 1999); "Violin Sonata" (which included Sawyer on piano); "The Humble Heart", a cantata built around texts by American Shakers, which debuted in 2006; and "Three for Trio". The 2001 Laurel Trio performance of Three for Trio was well received, being described as "the work of a person who is entirely at ease with traditional tonality stretched to its limits." Sawyer's first CD of his work - Eric Sawyer: String Works - was released under the Albany Records label in 2005 and featured four of his compositions. Sawyer's piano trio “Lincoln’s Two Americas” was one of three winners in the Ravinia Festival competition for Lincoln-themed chamber works to be performed as part of the Abraham Lincoln Bicentennial celebration in 2009.

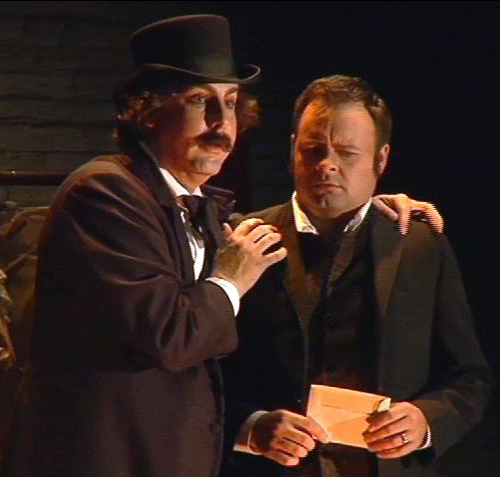
Our American Cousin, 2008

Along with librettist and University of California, Berkeley, English lecturer John Shoptaw, Sawyer has composed an opera based upon a play set in Ford's Theatre the night United States President Abraham Lincoln was assassinated by John Wilkes Booth. The play, Our American Cousin, by playwright Tom Taylor, is a farce, while the opera Our American Cousin contains the play, imagined intrigue among the actors and actresses, and production staff of the play, and historical information about the Abraham Lincoln assassination.

The opera had its staged premiere in Northampton, Massachusetts, in June, 2008. At this performance, reviewer David Perkins noted:

"...passages when words and music come together exquisitely. One is the series of choruses in Act I, when the Ford's Theatre audience turns and reforms into groups representing the war's human aftermath - amputees, freedmen, nurses, carpetbaggers, etc., singing words culled from real diaries and letters. Here is Sawyer's most beautiful music, drenched in a bittersweet chromaticism reminiscent of Benjamin Britten's War Requiem. These, and a final chorus condemning the cycle of 'blood for blood', might well be packaged separately. They speak clearly to our day."

A concert version of the opera was performed in 2007, and isolated works had been performed prior to that date. "Hawk's Aria" was performed in 1997, and "Laura Keene's aria" was performed in 1993. (At the 1993 performance, reviewer Robert Commanday noted that at this early performance the music was "appealing and finely written" but found the text to be "too wordy"). The Boston Modern Orchestra Project has recorded the opera, Our American Cousin on the BMOP/sound label. Sawyer composed a second opera, The Garden of Martyrs, which premiered on September 20, 2013, in Northampton, Massachusetts. The Garden of Martyrs was a prize winner in competition for “The American Prize.” a national award in opera composition.

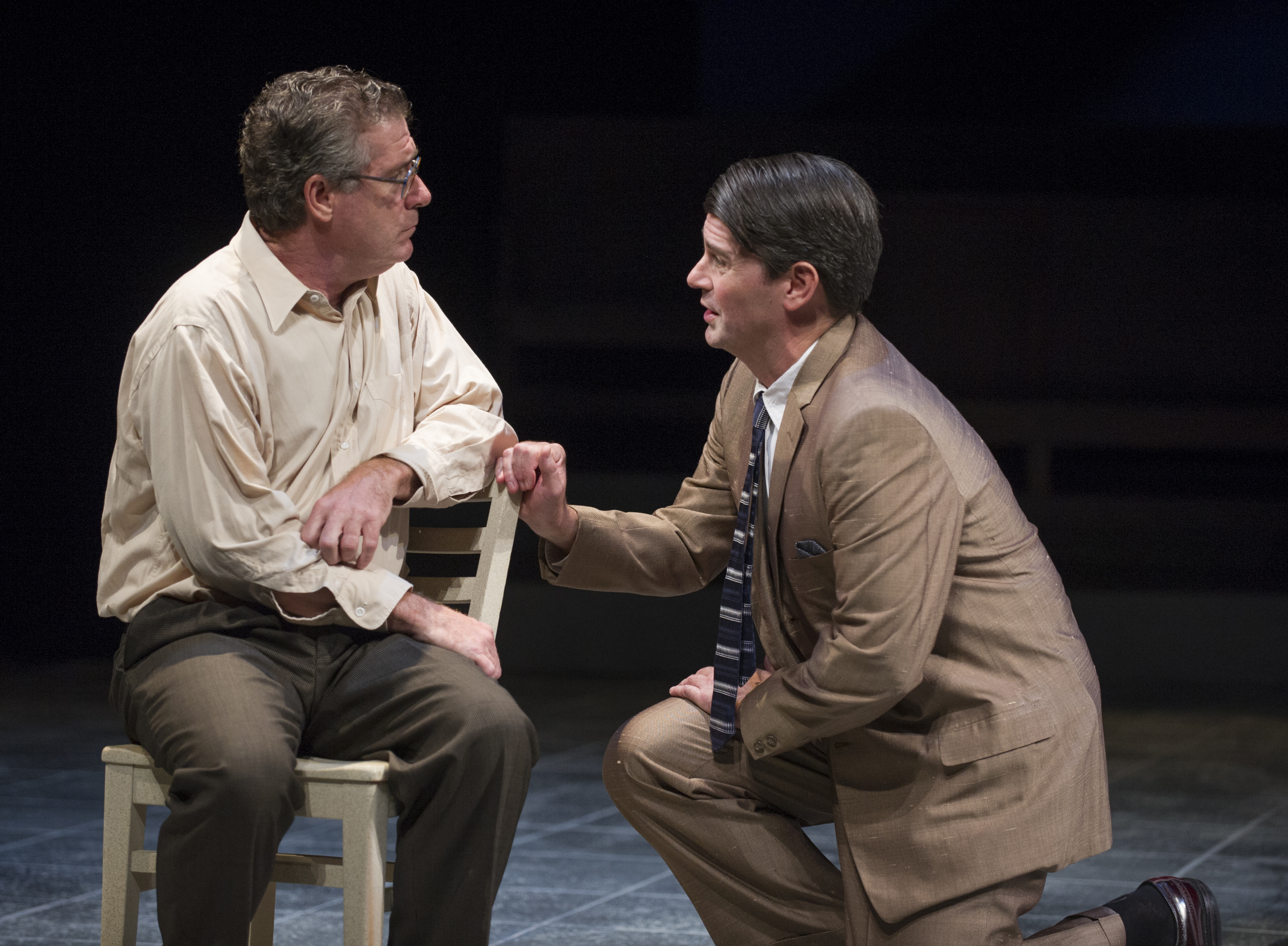
William Hite as Ned Spofford and Keith Phares as Newton Arvin in a scene from The Scarlet Professor by Eric Sawyer and Harley Erdman in 2017

The Scarlet Professor is Sawyer's third opera, based upon a true story of shame and scandal from 1960: a renowned English professor, Newton Arvin, who was arrested and disgraced for possessing gay magazines and materials. The opera received its premiere on September 15, 2017, at Smith College, the same campus where the events took place. Reviewer Marvin J Ward observed that: “…composer Eric Sawyer has a penchant for choosing historical events, especially local ones, as the subjects of his operas. This is the third that I have seen, each more polished and refined than its predecessor, with The Scarlet Professor scoring a 10/10 in my book." The Scarlet Professor won the 2019 American Prize in opera composition.

The Onion, Sawyer's latest opera, premiered in Boston on September 25, 2025. The new opera deals with issues of memory, thought and consciousness.
