= List of compositions by Max Bruch =

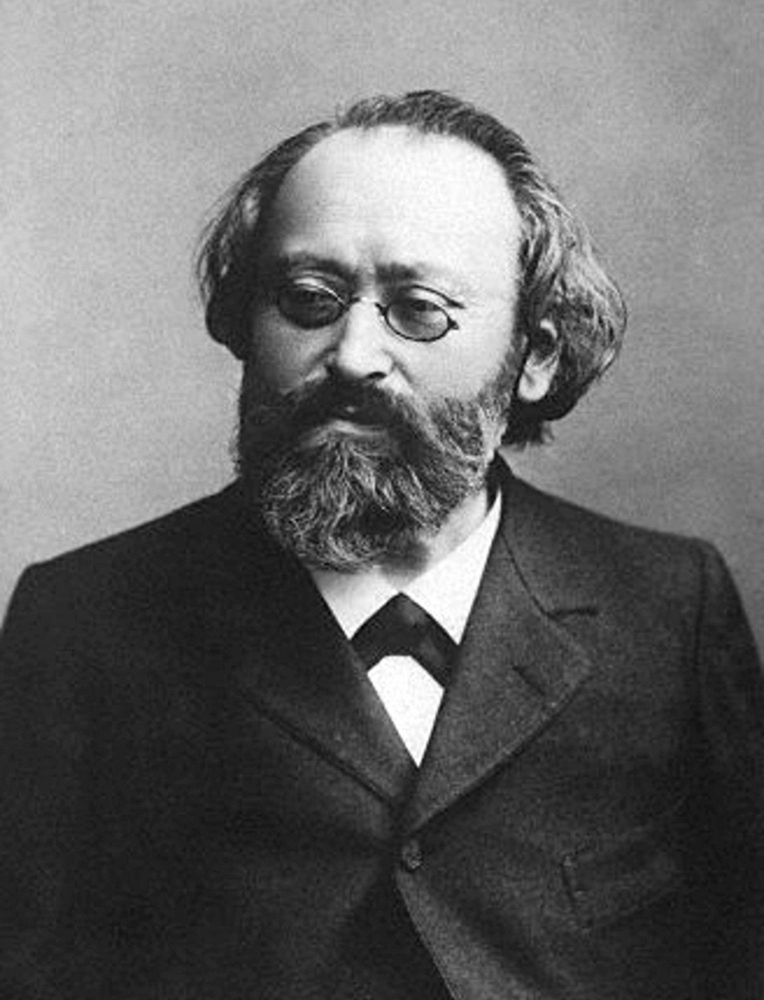
Max Bruch

This list of compositions by Max Bruch is sorted by genre.

== Operas ==
- Scherz, List und Rache, Op. 1
- Die Loreley, Op. 16 (1861)
- Hermione, Op. 40 (1872)
- Claudine von Villa Bella, Op. posthumous

== Orchestral works ==
- Symphony No. 1 in E♭ major, Op. 28 (Sondershausen, 1868)
- Symphony No. 2 in F minor, Op. 36 (Berlin, 1870)
- Symphony No. 3 in E major, Op. 51 (Berlin, 1887)
- Suite No. 1 on Russian Themes, Op. 79b (Berlin, 1903)
- Suite No. 2 for Orchestra (Nordland Suite) (on Swedish themes), Op. posth. (Berlin, 1906)
- Suite No. 3 for Orchestra and organ, Op. posth. (Berlin, 1904–1915)
- Swedish Dances, Op. 63 (Berlin, 1892)
- Serenade After Swedish Melodies, Op. Posth. (String Orchestra) (1916) (reworking of the Nordland Suite)

== Works for Soloist(s) and Orchestra ==
- Violin Concerto No. 1 in G minor, Op. 26 (1866-7. Premiered (revised version) Bremen, 1868)
- Romance for violin and orchestra in A minor, Op. 42 (Berlin, 1874)
- Violin Concerto No. 2 in D minor, Op. 44 (Berlin, 1878)
- Scottish Fantasy, for violin and orchestra in E♭ major, Op. 46 (Berlin, 1880)
- Kol Nidrei, for cello and orchestra, Op. 47 (Berlin, 1881)
- Canzone for cello and orchestra, Op. 55 (Berlin, 1891)
- Adagio on Celtic Themes for cello and orchestra, Op. 56 (Berlin, 1891)
- Adagio appassionato for violin and orchestra in C♯ minor, Op. 57 (Berlin, 1891)
- Violin Concerto No. 3 in D minor, Op. 58 (Berlin, 1891)
- Ave Maria for cello and orchestra, Op. 61 (Berlin, 1892)
- In Memoriam, Adagio for violin and orchestra, Op. 65 (Berlin, 1893)
- Serenade in A minor for violin and orchestra, Op. 75 (composed Cologne, 1899 August)
- Konzertstück (Concert Piece) for violin and orchestra in F♯minor, Op. 84 (Berlin, 1903)
- Romance for viola and orchestra in F major, Op. 85 (Mainz, 1911)
- Concerto for clarinet, viola, and orchestra in E minor, Op. 88 (1911)
- Concerto for two pianos and orchestra in A♭ minor, Op. 88a

== Choral works ==
- Jubilate-Amen (T. Moore), Op. 3 (Leipzig, 1858)
- Die Birken und die Erlen (G. Pfarrius), Op. 8 (Leipzig, 1859)
- 4 Männerchöre mit Orchester (H. Lingg), Op. 19 (Breslau, 1864)
- Die Flucht der heiligen Familie, ( J. Eichendorff) Op. 20 (Mannheim, 1864)
- Gesang der heiligen drei Könige, Op. 21 (Breslau, 1864)
- 4 Songs, (T. Moore) Op. 22 (Breslau, 1864)
- Frithjof: Szenen aus der Frithjof-Sage (E. Tegnèr), Op. 23 (Breslau, 1864)
- Schön Ellen (E. Geibel), ballad, Op. 24 (Bremen, 1867)
- Salamis: Siegesgesang der Griechen (H. Lingg), Op. 25 (Breslau, ?1868)
- Frithjof auf seines Vaters Grabhügel (Tegnèr), Op. 27 (Leipzig, 1870)
- Rorate coeli (after The Bible), Op. 29 (Leipzig, 1870)
- 2 Cantatas (R. Reinick), Op. 31 (Leipzig, 1870)
- Normannenzug (J.V. von Scheffel), Op. 32 (Leipzig, 1870)
- Römische Leichenfeier (H. Lingg), Op. 34 (Leipzig, 1870)
- Kyrie, Sanctus und Agnus Dei, ( traditional), Op. 35 (Leipzig, 1870)
- Das Lied vom Deutschen Kaiser, ( E. Geibel), Op. 37 (Bremen, 1871) (Note: Written to celebrate the Unification of Germany after the Franco-Prussian War, similar to Brahms's Triumphlied and Wagner's Kaisermarsch.)
- 5 Songs (J.V. von Scheffel), Op. 38 (Berlin, 1871)
- Dithyrambe (after Schiller), Op. 39 (Berlin, ?1871)
- Odysseus: Szenen aus der Odyssee (Wilhelm Paul Graff- after Homer?), Op. 41 (Berlin, 1872)
- Arminius (J. Cüppers), oratorio, Op. 43 (Berlin, 1877)
- Das Lied von der Glocke, oratorio for solo voices, chorus (SATB), and orchestra, after Das Lied von der Glocke of Friedrich Schiller, Op. 45 (1872)
- 4 Songs (J.V. von Scheffel), Op. 48 (Berlin, 1881)
- Achilleus (H. Bulthaupt), Op. 50 (Berlin, 1885)
- Das Feuerkreuz (H. Bulthaupt, after Walter Scott: The Lady of the Lake), Op. 52 (Berlin, 1889)
- 2 Männerchöre (E. Geibel), Op. 53 (Leipzig, 1890)
- Gruss an die heilige Nacht (R. Prutz), Op. 62 (Berlin, 1892)
- Hymne (Psalm 91), Op. 64 (Magdeburg, 1893)
- Leonidas (H. Bulthaupt), Op. 66 (Berlin, 1894)
- Moses (text by Ludwig Spitta (1845–1901)), Op. 67 (Berlin, 1894–95)
- 3 Songs (Goethe), Op. 68 (Magdeburg, 1896)
- Sei getreu bis an den Tod (after The Bible), Op. 69 (Magdeburg, 1885)
- In der Nacht: Nun schläfet man (Gerhard Tersteegen), Op. 72 (Magdeburg, 1897)
- Gustav Adolf (text by Albert Hackenberg (de)), oratorio, Op. 73 (Berlin, 1898)
- Herzog Moritz (K. Storch), Op. 74 (Magdeburg, 1899)
- Der letzte Abschied des Volkes (Grotthus), Op. 76 (Magdeburg, 1901)
- Damajanti (after anon. Indian poem), Op. 78 (Berlin, 1903)
- Osterkantate (E. Geibel), Op. 81 (Berlin, 1908)
- Das Wessobrunner Gebet (traditional), Op. 82 (Berlin, 1910)
- Die Macht des Gesangs (after Schiller), Op. 87 (Berlin, 1912)
- Heldenfeier (Margaretha Bruch (Note: The daughter of Max Bruch, written as a patriotic work after the onset of The Great War.)), Op. 89 (Berlin, 1915)
- 5 Songs (Ewald Bruch (Note: The son of Max Bruch, who wrote the text for the fourth song while fighting in the Vosges mountains in 1915.)), Op. 90 (Berlin, 1917)
- Die Stimme der Mutter Erde, Op. 91 (Leipzig, 1917)
- Christkindlieder (Margaretha Bruch), Op. 92 (Leipzig, 1917)
- Trauerfeier für Mignon (after Goethe), Op. 93 (Leipzig, 1919)

== Chamber works ==
- Septet in E♭ major, Op. posth. (1849)
- String Quartet (1850) (Note: Mentioned in an April 1850 letter by his teacher, Ferdinand Hiller.)
- String Quartet in C minor, Op. posth. (1852) (Note: Composed for a scholarship application, lost until 2013)
- Piano Trio in C minor, Op. 5
- String Quartet No. 1 in C minor, Op. 9 (1858–59)
- String Quartet No. 2 in E major, Op. 10 (1860)
- Piano Quintet in G minor, Op. posth. (Liverpool, 1886)
- Four pieces for cello and piano, Op. 70 (Berlin, 1896)
- Eight pieces for clarinet, viola, and piano, Op. 83 (1910)
- String Quintet in A minor, Op. posth. (Berlin, 1918)
- String Quintet in E♭ major, Op. posth. (Berlin, 1918)
- Octet for Strings in B♭ major, Op. posth. (Berlin, 1920)

=== Piano ===
- Capriccio for Piano 4-hands, Op. 2 (1857?)
- Fantasie for Two pianos, Op. 11 (1861)
- 6 Pieces for Piano, Op. 12 (1861)
- 2 Pieces for Piano, Op. 14 (1862)

== Lieder ==
- Three duets, Op. 4
- Seven Songs, Op. 6
- Six Songs, Op. 7
- Hymnus, Op. 13
- Four Songs, Op. 15
- Ten Songs, Op. 17
- Four Songs, Op. 18
- Die Priesterin der Isis in Rom, Op. 30
- Four Songs, Op. 33
- Lieder und Gesänge, Op. 49
- Siechentrost Lieder (Solace in Affliction), Op. 54
- Five Songs for Baritone, Op. 59
- Nine Songs, Op. 60
- Seven Part-Songs, Op. 71
- Szene der Marfa (Martha's Scene from Schiller's Demetrius), Op. 80
- Lieder für gemischten Chor, Op. 86
- Five Songs, Op. 97
- Für die Eltern WoO
- Zwölf schottische Volkslieder, Op. posth.

== Sources ==
- Fifield, Christopher (2005). Max Bruch: His Life and Works. Boydell Press.
