= Choral works by Max Bruch =

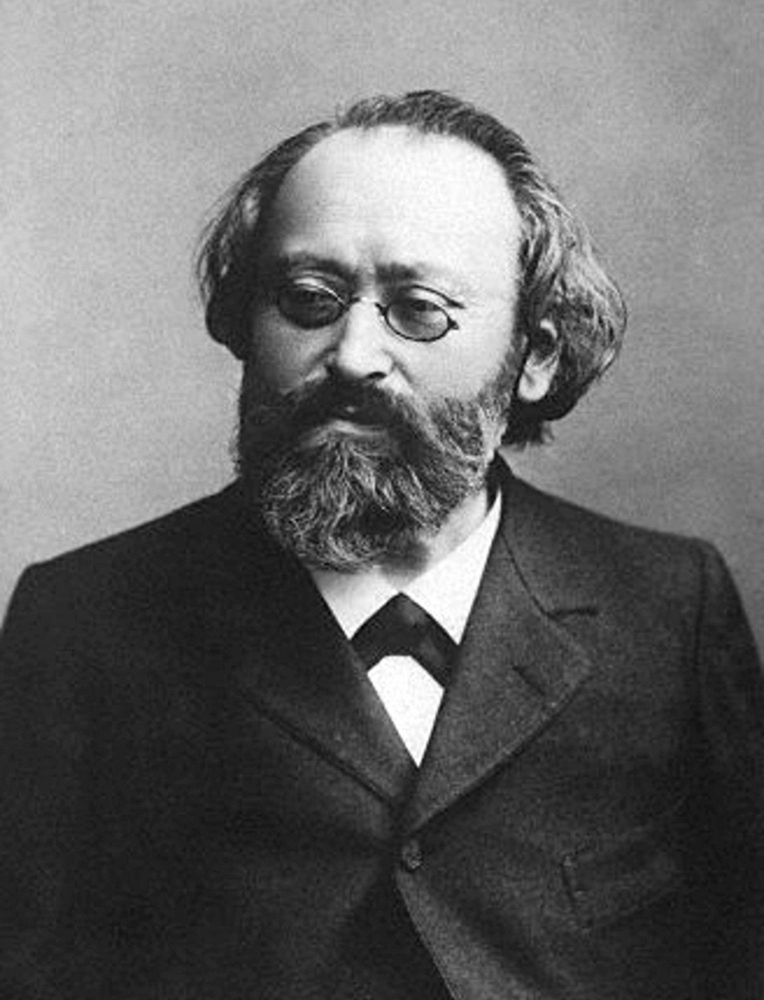
Max Bruch

Max Bruch composed a number of choral works that were, during his lifetime, judged to be his most successful pieces. Instrumental music makes up only about a third of Bruch's total output, while vocal music forms a considerably larger proportion. These works are described variously as oratorios and cantatas. His oratorios (mostly secular) are generally held to represent the best of his vocal writing. Some were of a religious character but many were based on mythological themes.

Many of Bruch's large-scale oratorios were inspired by the unification of Germany of which he was an eager supporter. His subjects focused on national leaders as role models (the Greeks Odysseus and Achilles, the German Arminius, the Swedish Gustav Adolf, and the biblical Moses). Bruch's compositions were eagerly taken up by the many amateur and professional choruses that were thriving in Germany at the time.

The New International Encyclopedia stated "the greatest master of the secular oratorio is Bruch." George Putnam Upton wrote "His greatest successes…. have been made with his works in the cantata form, as he is a recognised master of writing for large masses of voices and instruments, though many of his solo melodies possess great beauty. In this class of his compositions the most conspicuous are Scenes from the Frithjof-Saga… Flight of the Holy Family, Roman Triumph Song, Roman Obsequies, Salamis, Fair Ellen, Odysseus and Rorate Coeli."

== The Birch and the Alder ==
The Birch and the Alder (German: Die Birken und die Erlen) (opus 8) (2.2.2.2.-4.2.0.0. str, timp mixed (s)) (Note: see explanation at Shorthand for orchestra instrumentation) is a setting of a poem from the Waldlieder of Gustav Pfarrius. Bruch wrote it while he was in Cologne in 1857; it was published in Leipzig in 1858 and is dedicated to the poet.

== The Flight of the Holy Family ==
The Flight of the Holy Family (German: Die Flucht der heiligen Familie) (opus 20) is a setting for choir and orchestra (2 2 2 2 - 2 0 3 0 - chorus(satb) str tmp) of a poem by Joseph Freiherr von Eichendorff. The work was composed in Mannheim in 1863.

It narrates the Flight into Egypt, with the wings of angels creating a cooling breeze and fireflies lighting their way. The reviewer writing for the Niederrheinische Musikzeitung said that "a tender breeze of poetic feeling runs through the entire work. The overall effect…. is above all proof of the truth and purity of expression with which this composer has rendered his feelings." Together with opus 21, The Song of the Three Wise Men (Gesang der heiligen drei Könige), this work appears to have been part of an unfinished trilogy based on the Christmas story. The manuscript of opus 20 is dated 19 July 1863 and dedicated to the Crefeld Choral Society. Bruch conducted the first performance of the work with the society in December 1863.

== Frithjof ==
Frithjof (opus 23) was completed in October 1864 after Bruch had spent eight years working on it. It was first performed in Aachen on 20 November 1864, with Bruch conducting the Concordia male chorus, soloists and orchestra. It originally contained six scenes; a seventh was later added and the work republished as opus 27. It is based on Frithjof's Saga by Esaias Tegnér. The Monthly Musical Record pronounced it to be "the most important choral work of our time", it was his first great success with the German public, and it went on to become his greatest success for male choir.

== Fair Ellen ==
Fair Ellen (German: Schön Ellen) (opus 24) (2.2.2.2.-4.2.3.0. str, timp, perc, no, mixed (sb)) is a setting of a ballad by Emanuel Geibel. The work is set during the 1857 siege of Lucknow, during which Ellen is convinced that the city will be relieved, because she has such sharp hearing that she can hear the regimental song of the Campbells long before anyone else.

== Salamis ==
Salamis subtitled "A War Song of the Greeks" is a secular cantata (opus 25) written in 1866 for a quartet of male soloists, male choir and orchestra, based on a poem by Hermann Lingg. The work depicts the Greek warriors sailing home triumphant after their victory over Xerxes I.

The work was reviewed in the Allgemeine musikalische Zeitung of February 1868, in a piece by the editor, Selmar Bagge, who opined that "Bruch’s music bears the mark of sophistication, but which borders on degeneracy in its sumptuousness and extravagance." A July 1881 performance in Chicago was described by one critic as "a most interesting work, though not as effective (owing to greater intricacies) as the "Battle Prayer" [by Ferdinand Möhring]." Another critic commented that "it is a very ambitious hymn of triumph and its difficulties were no doubt felt by the chorus."

== The Flight into Egypt ==
The Flight into Egypt (German: Die Flucht nach Ägypten) (opus 31) (1.1.1.0.-3.0.0.0. str, female (s)) for soprano, choir and orchestra is a setting of a text by Robert Reinick. It was first performed in Frankfurt-am Main on 10 March 1871.

== The Lay of the Norsemen ==
The Lay of the Norsemen (German: Normannenzug) (opus 32) (2.2.2.2.-4.2.3.0. str, timp, mixed (b)) is a setting of part of the historical romance Ekkehard by Joseph Viktor von Scheffel. Bruch composed it in April and May 1869 and it was first performed in Leipzig in 1870. The setting is of material from the ninth chapter of Ekkehard, in which the eponymous hero is travelling through the forests of Swabia in late November. He seeks out the elderly Woman of the Wood after a discussion about witchcraft. She recalls the sweetheart of her youth, Friduhelm, who was kidnapped and became a Scandinavian pirate. She hums "an old Norseman’s song which he had once taught her."

== Odysseus ==
Odysseus: Scenes from the Odyssey (German: Odysseus: Szenen aus der Odyssee) (opus 41)

== Arminius ==
Arminius (op. 43) is an oratorio written between 1875 and 1877.

== The Lay of the Bell ==
The Lay of the Bell (German: Das Lied von der Glocke) (opus 45) scored for soloists, choir and orchestra (2(=picc).2.2.2-4.2.3.1-timp.perc:2-org-strings) is a setting of a poem by Friedrich Schiller that was one of his most popular in the nineteenth century. In particular it became a rallying-cry for German nationalism in the period immediately after the Franco-Prussian War. The work is indeed dedicated to Schiller himself and Bruch described it as the best work of his life.

Bruch began working on the piece on in Bonn in early 1877, but the second part was mostly sketched in Bergisch Gladbach. The draft was completed at the end of the year. On 8 January 1878, he began the fair copy of the score, which was completed on 21 April 1878. Simrock, his publisher, was reluctant to commit to printing it as Bruch's previous oratorio Arminius had only sold slowly. Bruch therefore had manuscript performance copies made at his own expense, so that the premiere could take place on 12 May 1878 under his baton in the Gürzenich concert hall in Cologne.

Bruch made the work a major feature of the Birmingham Triennial Music Festival in 1879 where it was praised for its 'charming freshness'.

== Three Hebrew Songs ==
The Three Hebrew Songs (German: Drei Hebräische Gesänge) (2.2.2.2.-4.2.3.0. str, timp, mixed) are based on Lord Byron’s Hebrew Melodies with music adapted from the setting by Isaac Nathan. Bruch gave a manuscript copy to his friend Henry Rensburg as a birthday present in 1880, although the third melody appears to date from somewhat later than the first two. The three songs are Beweinet, die geweint an Babels Strand (O Weep for Those That Wept…), In ihrer Schönheit wandelt sie (She Walks in Beauty, Like the Night) and Arabien’s Kameele (On Jordan’s Banks the Arabs’ Camels Stray).

== Achilleus ==
Achilleus (opus 50) (2.2.2.2-4.3.3.1-timp.perc:1-harp-strings)(satb) is a setting of a poem by Heinrich Bulthaupt, inspired by the Iliad. It was written in 1885, first performed at the Bonn Festival, and first performed in the United States in New York in 1886. Throughout the 1880s Bruch was urged to make cuts to the three-hour long work (he eventually shortened some of the music written for Andromache), but despite its length, the work was praised at its premiere and remained popular thereafter.

de:Josef Sittard judged that in the work "the beauty of language and the highest expression of form are harmoniously united... In Achileus Max Bruch has once again given proof of his gift for dramatic effect, for the handling of large musical forces, his great talent for colour and his sense of harmonic euphony."

== Greeting to the Holy Night ==
Greeting to the Holy Night (German: Gruß an die heilige Nacht) (opus 62) (2.2.2.2.-4.2.3.1. str, timp, perc, org, mixed (a)) It was written in 1892, based in a poem by Robert Prutz.

== Leonidas ==
Leonidas is a secular cantata (opus 66), written for baritone solo, male chorus and orchestra (3(III=picc).2.2.2-4.3.3.1-timp.perc:1-strings). with a libretto by Heinrich Bulthaupt. Bruch began working in the score in December 1893 and it was first performed on 1 March 1894, with Bruch himself conducting, at a concert to celebrate the 50th anniversary of the Bremer Künstlerverein. He described it as "just an interlude".

The choice of a historical Greek person as the subject of one of his works was a departure for Bruch from his previous preference for mythological heroes. Sparta, with its elite male military society, was a subject of widespread cultural interest in the German Empire; in particular the battle of Thermopylae, exemplifying selfless devotion to the fatherland, was much admired in conservative circles.

== Moses ==
Moses: ein biblisches Oratorium (opus 67) is an 1895 oratorio.

== Gustav Adolf ==
Gustav Adolf (opus 73) (2.2.2.2.-4.3.3.1. str, timp, perc, org, mixed (atb)) was composed in 1897-8 and first performed in Barmen on 22 May 1898. The subject of the work is king Gustavus Adolphus of Sweden, a Protestant hero of the Thirty Years War. The work was motivated by the kulturkampf of the 1870s, in which Bruch had generally supported Bismark against the Catholic Church.

== Damajanti ==
Damajanti (opus 78) for soprano, chorus and orchestra (2 3 2 3 - 4 2 3 1 - chorus str tmp) is based on the Indian-themed poem Nala and Damajanti by Friedrich Rückert, with excerpts from a poem by Heinrich Bulthaupt. It was written in 1903 though the idea had originally occurred to Bruch in 1886 but he did not receive a draft libretto from Heinrich Bulthaupt until 1893. Further work followed, and the final libretto was compiled by Bruch himself, combining Rückert's translation of the ancient Indian epic with fragments of the poem by Bulthaupt. The première finally took place on 20 October 1903.

The subject of the work is Damajanti, wife of the young Indian king Nala, who, led astray by an evil spirit, has gambled away his realm and is wandering in a desolate wilderness with her. Distraught by their suffering, he asks Damayanti to part ways from him but she refuses. One night, while she is sleeping, Nala secretly abandons her, believing that no further evil can befall her once he is gone.

The cantata begins at the point where Damajanti finds herself alone and despairing in the wilderness. She decides to seek help from penitents in a grove and explains that she needs their help to find her husband. They agree to assist her but the grove then vanishes. Damayanti wonders whether the grove and the penitents were only figments of her imagination. Her doubts are soon dispelled when invisible guardian spirits encourage her to continue her search. Full of hope and confidence, she again sets out on her path.

== Recordings ==
- Arminius, Gottinger Symphonie Orchestra! Rheinische Kantorei, Classic Produktion Osnabrück, 2009 CPO777453
- Max Bruch, Hugo Wolf – Weihnachtskantaten (incl. Greeting to the Holy Night and The Flight of the Holy Family, Philharmonischer Chor Berlin, Radio-Symphonie-Orchester Berlin, Koch Schwann Musica Sacra 1989 – 313 013 H1
- Max Bruch: Weihnachtsmusik, WDR Rundfunkchor Köln, WDR Rundfunkorchester Köln, Capriccio C10870
- Max Bruch: Schön Ellen, Serenade, Schwedische Tänze, Kantorei Barmen-Gemarke, Wuppertal Symphony Orchestra, 2001 MDG 335 1096–2
- Das Lied von der Glocke, Philharmonischer Chor Prag, Kuehn's Mixed Chorus, Staatskapelle Weimar, Classic Produktion Osnabrück, 2005 CPO777130
- Damajanti and other choral works, Cracow State Philharmonic Choir, Orchestra Of The Cracow Philharmonia Koch Schwann 1997 3–1253–2

== See also ==
- List of compositions by Max Bruch

== Videos of performances ==
- Frithjof
- Fair Ellen
- The Flight into Egypt
- extract from Arminius
- extract from The Lay of the Bell
- Three Hebrew Songs
- Achilleus
- Greeting to the Holy Night
- Leonidas
- extract from Damajanti
