= Bulthaupt =

Bulthaupt may refer to:

- Axel Bulthaupt (1966-), German entertainer
- Heinrich Bulthaupt, (1849-1905), German poet, dramatic author, and lawyer,
