= Op. 63 =

In music, Op. 63 stands for Opus number 63. Compositions that are assigned this number include:

- Alkan – Esquisses
- Arnold – Symphony No. 3
- Britten – Missa Brevis
- Bruch – Swedish Dances
- Chopin – Mazurkas, Op. 63
- Elgar – Symphony No. 2
- Lyapunov – Piano Sextet
- Prokofiev – Violin Concerto No. 2
- Schumann – Piano Trio No. 1
- Shostakovich – The Gamblers
- Sibelius – Symphony No. 4 in A minor (1911)
- Strauss – Josephslegende
- Weber – Trio for Piano, Flute and Cello
