= Fiery cross =

Fiery Cross or The Fiery Cross may also refer to:

- Fiery cross (bidding stick), a term used in early Scotland for a burning piece of wood used as a beacon
- Fiery Cross (clipper), a British tea clipper
- The Fiery Cross (Bruch), an 1889 cantata by Max Bruch
- The Fiery Cross (newsletter), a defunct newsletter of the United Klans of America
- The Fiery Cross (novel), a 2001 novel by Diana Gabaldon
- The Fiery Cross (zine), a British role-playing game zine published in the mid-1980s
- Fiery Cross Reef, a group of three reefs on the western edge of Dangerous Ground in the Spratly Islands of the South China Sea

== See also ==
- Cross burning, a practice that is associated with the Ku Klux Klan
- Heroes of the Fiery Cross, a 1928 book by Alma Bridwell White
