= Christus (opera) =

- Sacred opera by Anton Rubinstein
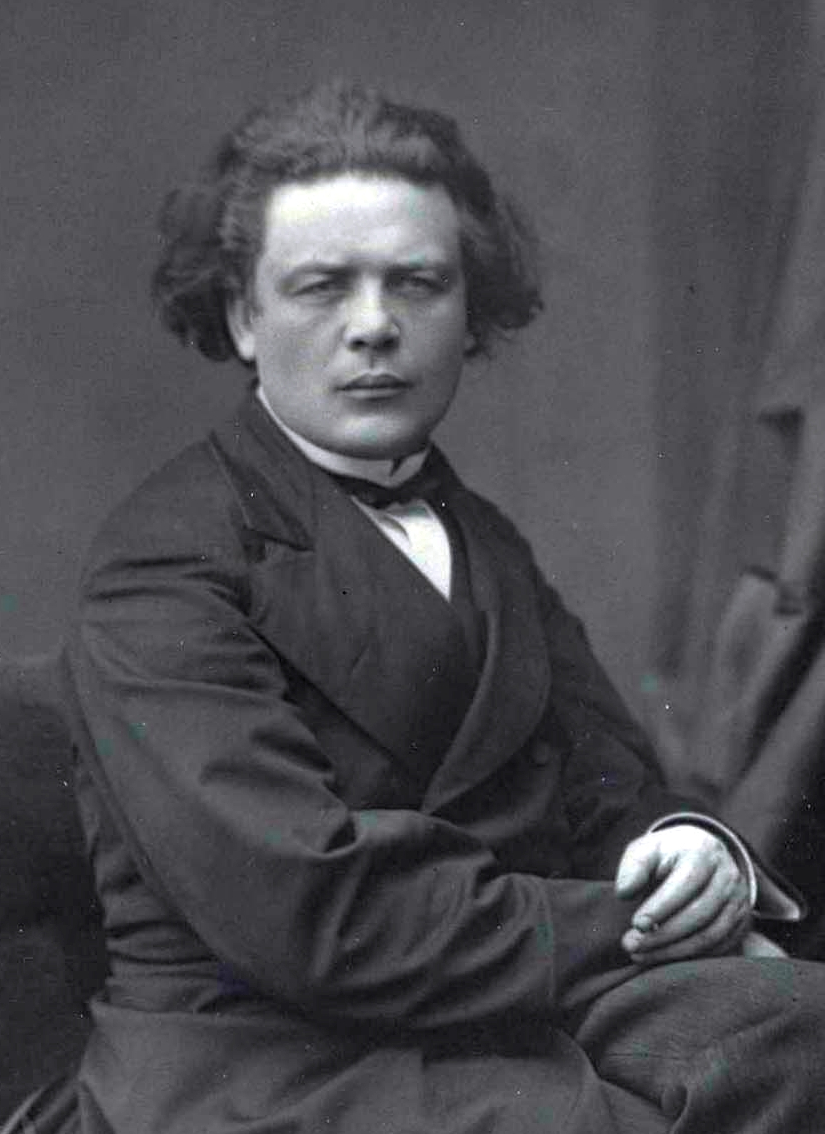
- The composer
- Language: German
- Based on: poem by Heinrich Bulthaupt
- Premiere: 2 June 1894; Stuttgart

Christus is an opera in seven scenes with a prologue and epilogue by Anton Rubinstein, written between the years 1887–1893 to a libretto after a poem by Heinrich Bulthaupt.

== Background ==
Christus was described by its composer as a 'sacred opera'. This is a term invented by Rubinstein, ('geistliche Oper' in German) denoting staged works with 'use of polyphonic choruses and a sober, edifying style relying on ‘exalted declamation’.' Rubinstein composed three other works of this type, Sulamith, Moses and Der Thurm zu Babel (The Tower of Babel). A fifth sacred opera, Cain, was uncompleted at his death.

Rubinstein considered Christus to be his finest composition.

== Performance history ==
Parts of the work were performed in Berlin in April 1894, and Rubinstein conducted a complete performance in Stuttgart on 2 June 1894. This was in fact his last public appearance as a conductor. The work received a further series of complete performances, at Bremen, in 1895. Applause between scenes and after the performance was forbidden. Apparently the work was not revived until a performance in Tyumen in 2002, conducted by the composer's great-grandson, Anton Sharoyev. This was also therefore the work's first performance in Russia. A recording of part of the work was made from live performances under Sharoyev in St. Petersburg in 2003.

== Roles ==
Role	Voice type	Premiere Cast, 2 June 1894 (Conductor:Anton Rubinstein )
Angel of the annunciation	soprano	
Jesus Christ	tenor	Raimund von zur-Mühlen
Satan	bass	
John the Baptist	baritone	
The Virgin Mary	contralto	
Pontius Pilate	baritone	
Judas Iscariot	baritone	
Mary Magdalene	soprano	
Chorus: mob, angels, demons, priests etc.

== Synopsis ==
Christus treats the life of Jesus according to the New Testament. It is made up of the following scenes:

- Outside the stable at Bethlehem; the three kings arrive to pay homage.
- Jesus arguing with Satan in the desert
- His baptism by John
- Jesus performs miracles and defends Mary Magdalene.
- Jesus's anger in the Temple
- The Last Supper and Jesus's arrest
- The trial before Pilate
- The crucifixion (off-stage): demons and angels battle.
- St Paul leads praise of Christ.

== Sources ==
- Anon, Sleeve notes to recording of Christus; Anton Sharoyev conducting Tyumen State Philharominc Orchestra, 2003,"Zvuk" ZV - 11 03207
- Graham Dixon and Richard Taruskin. "Sacred opera." Grove Music Online accessed 17 April 2010
- H Krehbiel, A Second Book of Operas, accessed 17 April 2010
- Charles Maclean, Rubinstein as Composer for the Pianoforte (January–March 1914). Sammelbände der Internationalen Musikgesellschaft 15. Jahrg. (H. 2.): pp. 360–374.
- R. Taruskin, Christian Themes in Russian Opera: A Millennial Essay(March 1990). Cambridge Opera Journal, 2 (1): pp. 83–91.
