= Natasha D'Schommer =

American photographer

Natasha D'Schommer from Minneapolis, Minnesota, known for her photographs of rare books and manuscripts from the private Scheide Library rare book collection owned by the late William Scheide (husband of Judith McCartin Scheide), aunt to Natasha D'Schommer).

D'Schommer was born in Minneapolis in 1972. "She graduated from New England College in West Sussex, England, with a degree in English literature, and completed a Master of Fine Arts degree at Vermont College of Fine Arts."

D'Schommer was a 2005 recipient of the McKnight Photography Fellowship. D'Schommer photographs rare books and musical manuscripts, including Ludwig van Beethoven’s sketchbooks (1815), the Gutenberg Bible (1455), J.S. Bach's Cantata No. 33, and original copies of all of the first four printed Bibles as well as copy of the Qur'an from about 1700.
