= Allein zu dir, Herr Jesu Christ, BWV 33 =

1724 church cantata by J. S. Bach

Allein zu dir, Herr Jesu Christ
- BWV 33
- Chorale cantata by J. S. Bach
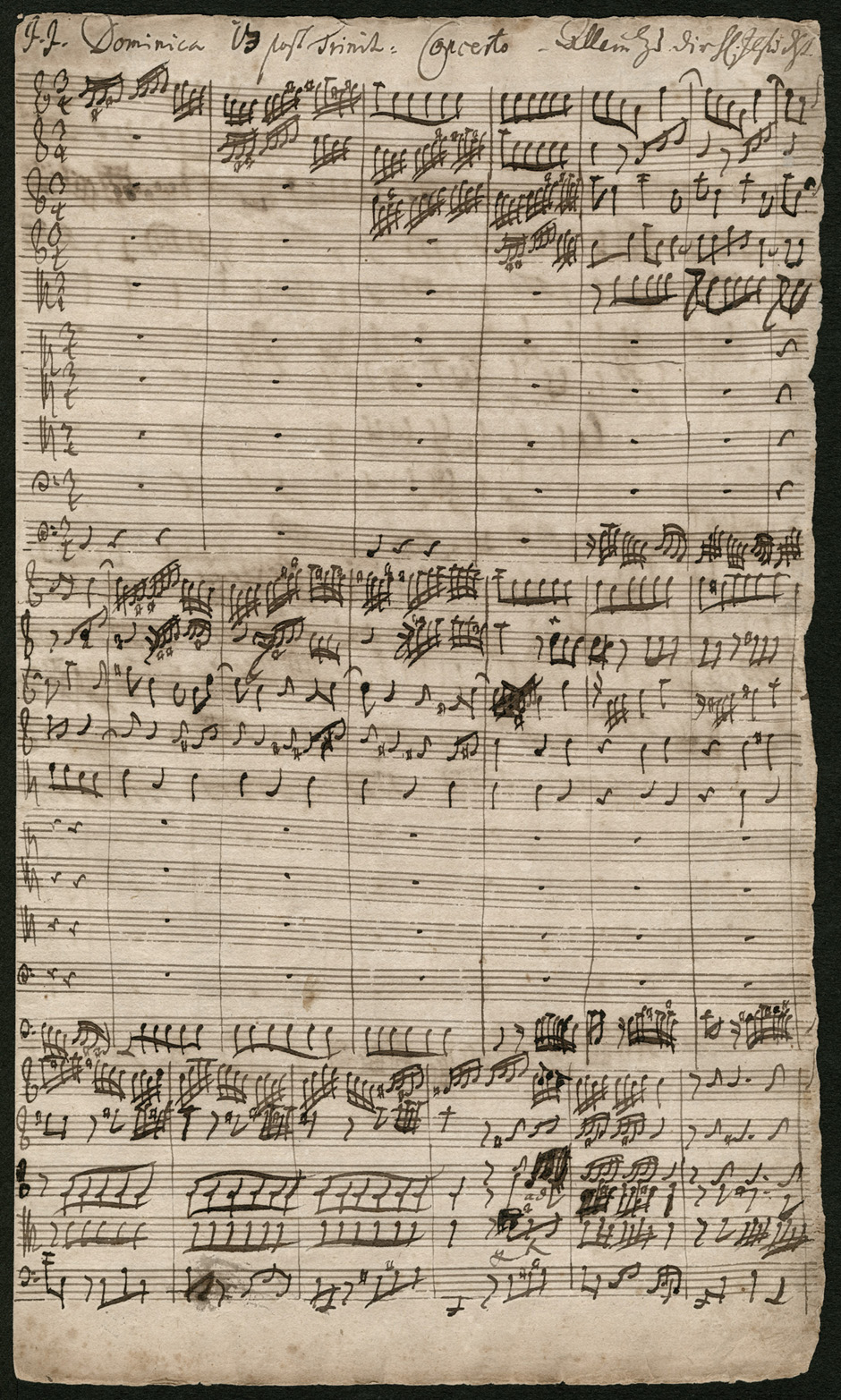
- First page from the autograph
- Occasion: 13th Sunday after Trinity
- Chorale: "Allein zu dir, Herr Jesu Christ by Konrad Hubert
- Performed: 3 September 1724: Leipzig
- Movements: six
- Vocal: SATB choir; solo: alto, tenor and bass
- Instrumental: 2 oboes; 2 violins; viola; continuo

Johann Sebastian Bach composed the church cantata Allein zu dir, Herr Jesu Christ (Only upon You, Lord Jesus Christ), BWV 33, in Leipzig in 1724 for the thirteenth Sunday after Trinity and first performed it on 3 September 1724. The chorale cantata is based on the 1540 hymn "Allein zu dir, Herr Jesu Christ" by Konrad Hubert.

Allein zu dir, Herr Jesu Christ belongs to Bach's chorale cantata cycle, the second cycle during his tenure as Thomaskantor that began in 1723. The text retains the first and last stanza of the chorale unchanged, while the text of the two inner stanzas was paraphrased by an unknown librettist into a sequence of four movements, alternating recitatives and arias. The first movement is a chorale fantasia, and the work is closed by a four-part chorale setting.

The cantata is scored for three vocal soloists, a four-part choir, a Baroque instrumental ensemble of oboes and strings, and basso continuo.

== History and words ==
Bach composed the cantata in his second year in Leipzig for the 13th Sunday after Trinity. That year, Bach composed a cycle of chorale cantatas that began on the first Sunday after Trinity of 1724. The prescribed readings for the Sunday were from the Epistle to the Galatians, Paul's teaching on law and promise (Galatians 3:15–22), and from the Gospel of Luke, the parable of the Good Samaritan (Luke 10:23–37).

The cantata is based on the hymn by Konrad Hubert which was published in Nürnberg in 1540 with an added fourth stanza. Each of the stanzas consists of nine lines. For the cantata text, an unknown poet retained the words of stanzas 1 and 4 unchanged for movements 1 and 6, but paraphrased the ideas of the inner stanzas, each to a sequence of recitative and aria. Due to the splitting of each stanza in two movements, the paraphrasing is more independent from the original than for the previous cantatas of the cycle. The hymn, focused on a sinner asking Jesus for redemption, is only generally connected to the Gospel. The poet referenced the Gospel in movement 4, "Gib mir nur aus Barmherzigkeit / den wahren Christenglauben" (Of your mercy grant me / the true Christian faith), addressing God as the true "Good Samaritan", also in movement 5, "Gib, daß ich aus reinem Triebe / als mich selbst den Nächsten liebe" (Grant that my purest impulse may be / to love my neighbour as myself"), citing the central line of the parable. The poet also referenced other Bible passages. In movement 2 he referred to Job 9:3, "If he will contend with him, he cannot answer him one of a thousand.", and in movement 4 to both Psalms 51:13, "Then will I teach transgressors thy ways; and sinners shall be converted unto thee." and Galatians 5:6, "Then will I teach transgressors thy ways; and sinners shall be converted unto thee."

The chorale melody "Allein zu dir, Herr Jesu Christ," of unknown authorship, was documented in a 1541 Wittenberg publication. It was used extensively, for example, by Sethus Calvisius and Michael Praetorius. According to Klaus Hofmann, it was composed in 1512 for a secular song by Paul Hofhaimer. In the cantata, Bach used the complete melody in a chorale fantasia in movement 1 and in the closing chorale, while he alluded to it in movement 5, a duet.

Bach first performed the cantata on 3 September 1724.

== Music ==
=== Structure and scoring ===
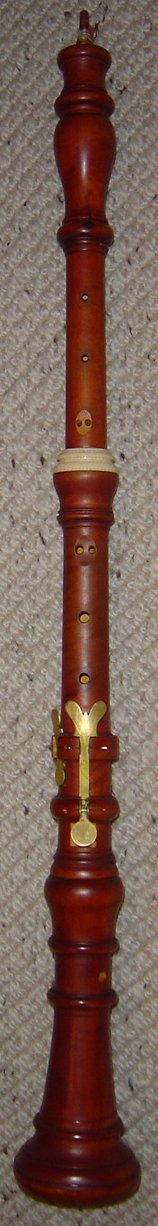
Baroque oboe

Bach structured the cantata in six movements. Both text and tune of the hymn are retained in the outer movements, a chorale fantasia and a four-part closing chorale. Bach scored the work for three vocal soloists (alto (A), tenor (T) and bass (B)), a four-part choir, and a Baroque instrumental ensemble of two oboes (Ob), two violin parts (Vl), one viola part (Va), and basso continuo.

In the following table of the movements, the scoring, keys and time signatures are taken from Alfred Dürr's standard work Die Kantaten von J. S. Bach. The continuo, which plays throughout, is not shown.

Movements of Allein zu dir, Herr Jesu Christ
No.	Title	Type	Vocal	Winds	Strings	Key	Time
1	Allein zu dir, Herr Jesu Christ	Chorus	SATB	2Ob	2Vl Va Bc	A minor	3/4
2	Mein Gott und Richter	Recitative	B		Bc		common time
3	Wie furchtsam wankten meine Schritte	Aria	A		2Vl Va Bc	C major	common time
4	Mein Gott, verwirf mich nicht	Recitative	T		Bc		common time
5	Gott, der du die Liebe heißt	Duet	T B	2Ob	Bc	E minor	3/4
6	Ehr sei Gott in dem höchsten Thron	Chorale	SATB	1Ob (col Soprano); 1Ob (coll'Alto)	1Vl (col Soprano); 1Vl (coll'Alto); Va (col Tenore); Bc	A minor	common time

=== Movements ===
In his first year in Leipzig, Bach had composed for the same occasion Du sollt Gott, deinen Herren, lieben, BWV 77, opening with a chorus on important law, on which, according to the parallel Matthew 22:34–40, "hang all the law and the prophets": "You shall love God, your Lord, with all your heart, with all your soul, with all your strength and with all your mind, and your neighbor as yourself".

==== 1 ====
The opening chorus, "Allein zu dir, Herr Jesu Christ, mein Hoffnung steht auf Erden" (Only upon you, Lord Jesus Christ, does my hope rest on earth), is a chorale fantasia, with the cantus firmus in the soprano, and the lower voices singing mostly in homophony, but occasionally in polyphony. The singing, described as "block-like", is embedded in expansive ritornellos framing all nine lines of the hymn. John Eliot Gardiner, who conducted the Bach Cantata Pilgrimage in 2000, noted:

the fineness of the gemstone, the choral delivery of Konrad Hubert's nine-lined hymn, is in constant danger of being eclipsed by the ornate beauty of its orchestral setting, energetic in its forward propulsion, motivic invention and proto-symphonic development, through its nine instrumental ritornellos, ranging from five to twenty-four bars.

==== 2 ====
The first recitative is sung by the bass, "Mein Gott und Richter, willt du mich aus dem Gesetze fragen" (My God and judge, if you question me upon the law).

==== 3 ====
In the alto aria, movement 3, "Wie furchtsam wankten meine Schritte" (How fearful were my shaky steps), fearfulness is expressed by the muted first violins and pizzicato in the other strings, while shaky steps appear in syncopated lines. Gardiner noted the aria's similarity to the soprano aria "Wie zittern und wanken der Sünder Gedanken" (How the thoughts of the sinner tremble and waver) in Bach's cantata Herr, gehe nicht ins Gericht mit deinem Knecht, BWV 105, composed for the 9th Sunday after Trinity in the previous year.

==== 4 ====
The second recitative is sung by the tenor, "Mein Gott, verwirf mich nicht, wiewohl ich dein Gebot noch täglich übertrete" (My God, do not toss me away, although daily I still overstep your commandments).

==== 5 ====
The last aria is a duet of tenor and bass, "Gott, der du die Liebe heißt, ach, entzünde meinen Geist" (God, you who are called Love, ah, ignite my spirit). It depicts God's love in "almost naive-sounding parallel sixths and thirds", consonances in "unanimity of movement" being an image of unity that would be understood by the audience at the time. In contrast, Bach sets the words "stören Feinde meine Ruh" (should enemies disturb my peace) in lively syncopated motion, "peace" in long notes.

==== 6 ====
The closing chorale is a four-part setting of the melody. The text, beginning "Ehr sei Gott in dem höchsten Thron, dem Vater aller Güte" (Honor be to God on the highest throne, the Father of all goodness), is an expanded doxology.

Bach emphasised the words "Güte" (goodness) and "in der Ewigkeit" (in eternity), described by Gardiner as "an admirable melismatic interweaving of all four vocal lines at cadential points".

== Manuscripts and publication ==
Both an autograph score and a set of parts are preserved for the cantata. The score is owned by the Scheide Library at Princeton University, given to the university as part of a library of rare books and manuscripts bequeathed by William T. Scheide. According to Eric White, the Scheide librarian, the manuscript first passed to Bach's eldest son, Wilhelm Friedemann Bach; after his death and was subsequently owned by Carl Philipp Heinrich Pistor (1778–1847); it likely came to the attention of Felix Mendelssohn through Pistor's sister Elisabeth; Mendelssohn probably showed the score to his teacher Carl Friedrich Zelter, who clarified the text in the final chorale with dark red ink. From there, the score passed to Julius Schubring (1806–1889), who allowed the musicologist Wilhelm Rust to use it as the basis of the first printed edition in the Bach-Gesellschaft Ausgabe, published in 1857. Schubring's son, Walter Schubring (1881–1969) auctioned off the score in May 1965, where it was purchased by Scheide. The parts remained at Thomasschule and are held by the Bach Archive.

In the Neue Bach-Ausgabe, it was published in 1958 edited by Werner Neumann, with a critical report following in 1959. The facsimile of the manuscript was published in Johann Sebastian Bach. Cantata Autographs in American Collections, edited by Robert L. Marshall, in 1985. A digital copy is also available through the Princeton University Library's website.

== Recordings ==
A list of recordings is provided on the Bach Cantatas Website. Ensembles playing period instruments in historically informed performances are shown with a green background.

Recordings of Allein zu dir, Herr Jesu Christ
Title	Conductor / Choir / Orchestra	Soloists	Label	Year	Orch. type
J. S. Bach: Cantatas BWV 33 & BWV 95	Hans Heintze Bremer Domchor Bremer Bach-Orchester	Eva Bornemann; Georg Jelden; Roland Kunz	Cantate/Vanguard	1962	
J. S. Bach: Das Kantatenwerk • Complete Cantatas • Les Cantates, Folge / Vol. 2	Gustav Leonhardt Knabenchor Hannover Leonhardt-Consort	René Jacobs; Marius van Altena; Max van Egmond	Teldec	1974	Period
Bach Cantatas Vol. 4 – Sundays after Trinity I	Karl Richter Münchener Bach-Chor Münchener Bach-Orchester	Julia Hamari; Peter Schreier; Dietrich Fischer-Dieskau	Archiv Produktion	1976	
Die Bach Kantate Vol. 49	Helmuth Rilling Gächinger Kantorei Bach-Collegium Stuttgart	Helen Watts; Frieder Lang; Philippe Huttenlocher	Hänssler	1979	
Bach Edition Vol. 4 – Cantatas Vol. 1	Pieter Jan Leusink Holland Boys Choir Netherlands Bach Collegium	Sytse Buwalda; Knut Schoch, Bas Ramselaar	Brilliant Classics	1999	Period
Bach Cantatas Vol. 6: Köthen/Frankfurt	John Eliot Gardiner Monteverdi Choir English Baroque Soloists	Nathalie Stutzmann; Christoph Genz; Jonathan Brown	Soli Deo Gloria	2000	Period
J. S. Bach: Complete Cantatas Vol. 13	Ton Koopman Amsterdam Baroque Orchestra & Choir	Franziska Gottwald; Paul Agnew; Klaus Mertens	Antoine Marchand	2000	Period
J. S. Bach: Cantatas Vol. 24 Cantatas from Leipzig 1724	Masaaki Suzuki Bach Collegium Japan	Robin Blaze; Gerd Türk; Peter Kooy	BIS	2002	Period
