= Julius Rodenberg =

German Jewish poet and author (1831–1914)

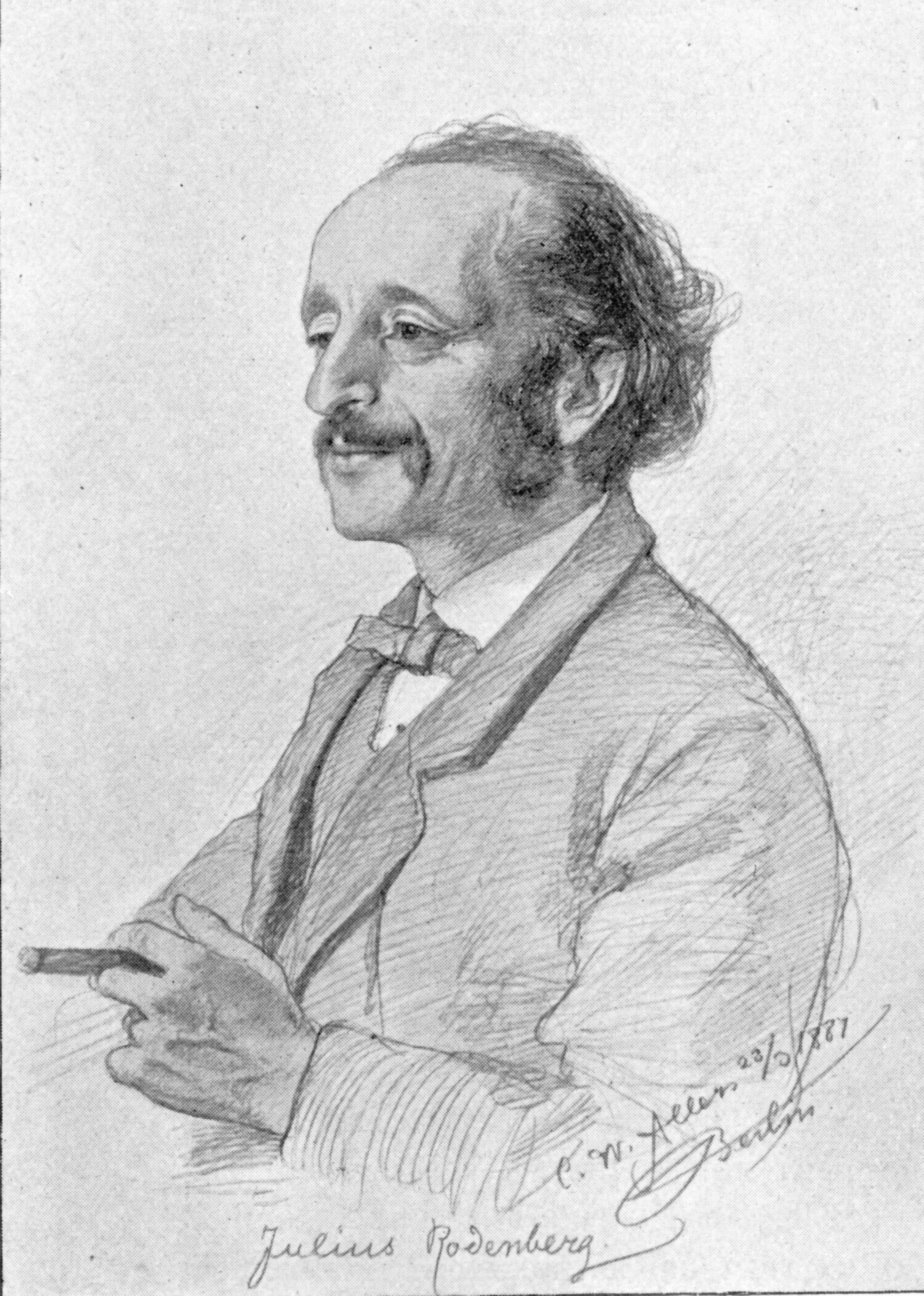
- Julius Rodenberg, 1889, by C.W.Allers
- Born: Julius Levy; 26 June 1831; Rodenberg, Hesse
- Died: 11 July 1914 (aged 83); Berlin, Germany
- Occupations: Writer journalist poet
- Spouse: Justina Schiff (1837–1923)
- Children: 1864 Alice
- Parent(s): Simon Gumbert Levy; Amalia Coppel/Levy

Julius Rodenberg (originally Julius Levy; 26 June 1831, Rodenberg – 11 July 1914, Berlin) was a German Jewish poet and author.

He studied law at the universities of Heidelberg, Göttingen, Berlin, and Marburg, but soon abandoned jurisprudence for literature. In 1851 his first poem, "Dornröschen", appeared in Bremen. This poem was soon followed by many others. Between 1855 and 1862 he traveled, visiting Great Britain, Belgium, the Netherlands, Denmark, Italy, and Switzerland. In 1859 he settled in Berlin.

Rodenberg wrote the libretto to Anton Rubinstein's operas Feramors and Der Thurm zu Babel.

From 1867 to 1874 he was coeditor with Ernst Dohm of the Salon für Literatur, Kunst und Gesellschaft. In 1874 he founded the Deutsche Rundschau, a high-quality monthly periodical for literature, culture, and politics, which he continued to edit until his death.

In 1897 he received the title "Professor". Rodenberg was a prolific writer.

== Literary works ==
Of his works may be mentioned:

- "Lieder", Hanover, 1854
- "Pariser Bilderbuch", Brunswick, 1856
- "Kleine Wanderchronik", Hanover, 1858
- "Ein Herbst in Wales", ib. 1857
- "Die Insel der Seligen," Berlin, 1860
- "Alltagsleben in London," ib. 1860
- "Die Harfe von Erin," ib. 1861
- "Tag und Nacht in London," ib. 1862
- "Lieder und Gedichte," ib. 1863 (6th ed., 1901)
- "Studienreisen in England," Leipzig, 1872
- "Belgien und die Belgier," Berlin, 1881
- "Bilder aus dem Berliner Leben," ib. 1885 (3d ed., 1891)
- "Unter den Linden," ib. 1888
- "Franz Dingelstedt," ib. 1891
- "Erinnerungen aus der Jugendzeit," ib. 1899

=== Novels ===
- "Die Strassensängerin von London," Berlin, 1863
- "Die Neue Sündflut," ib. 1865
- "Von Gottes Gnaden," ib. 1870
- "Die Grandidiers", Stuttgart, 1879 (2d ed., 1881), a story of the Franco-Prussian war
- "Herrn Schellbogens Abenteuer," Berlin, 1890
- "Klostermanus Grundstück," ib. 1890 (2d ed., 1892)
