= Feramors =

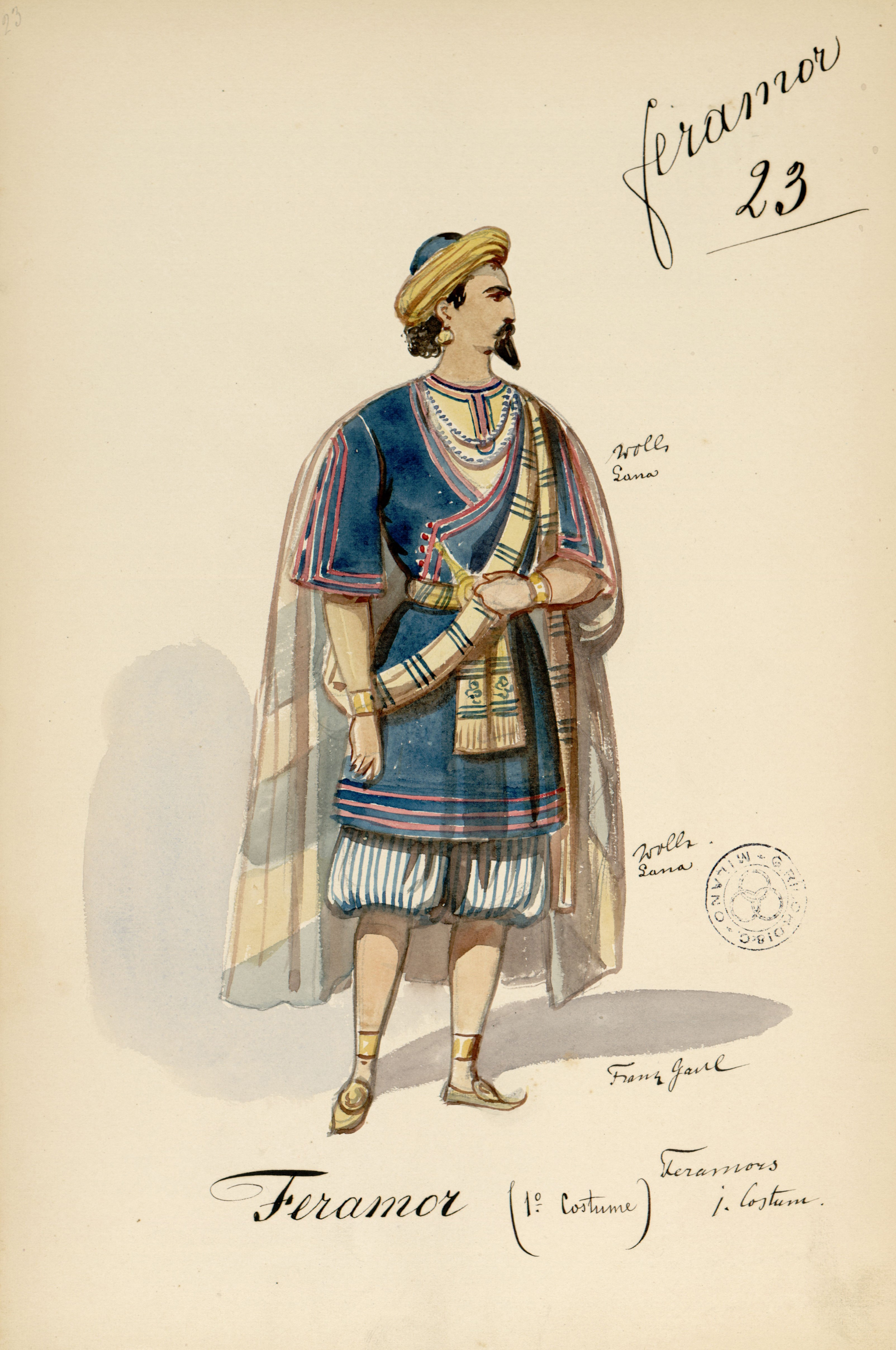
Feramor, costume design for Feramors (1872).

Feramors is an opera in three (first version) or two (second version) acts by Anton Rubinstein to a libretto by Julius Rodenberg. The story is based on Lalla Rookh by the Irish poet Thomas Moore. The opera was composed in 1862.

== Performance history ==
The opera was premiered at the Semperoper in Dresden on 24 February 1863, and had subsequent stagings in Vienna (1872), Milan (1874), Berlin (1879), and Danzig (1880). Its first production in Russia was an amateur performance in Saint Petersburg in 1884. The first professional production there was on 18 August 1898 at the Mariinsky Theatre, conducted by Felix Blumenfeld. The reason for its late appearance on the Russian stage was competition from an opéra-comique on the same subject by Félicien David. Peter Tchaikovsky, who heard the opera at the Berlin 1879 staging, liked the opera and wrote to Nadezhda von Meck that "it comes from the period in which Rubinstein did all his best work, that is 20 years ago".

Perhaps the same Berlin production of 4 March 1879 produced an interesting report in the Musical Times; "Rubinstein's opera ... was successfully produced on the 4th ult. at the Royal Opera house at Berlin, the principal rôles being taken by Herr Niemann and Madame Mallinger; in consequence, however, of the latter having refused to sing certain portions of her part, the composer abstained from personally conducting his work."

== Roles ==
Roles, voice types
Role	Voice type
Lalla Roukh, princess of Hindustan	soprano
Hafisa, her friend	contralto
Feramors, a minstrel	tenor
Fadladin, ruler (Grossvezier) of Hindustan	bass
Chosru, ambassador of the king of Bokhara	baritone
A muezzin	tenor
A messenger	tenor

== Synopsis ==
Lalla, the princess of Hindustan, is engaged to marry the King of Bokhara, but falls in love with the minstrel Feramors, who turns out to be the King in disguise.

== Recordings ==
There are a number of recordings of the ballet music from the opera, which includes a 'Torch Dance' and a 'Dance of Bayaderes', both written in the composer's style of exotic orientalism.
