= Konrad Hubert =

16th-century German theologian

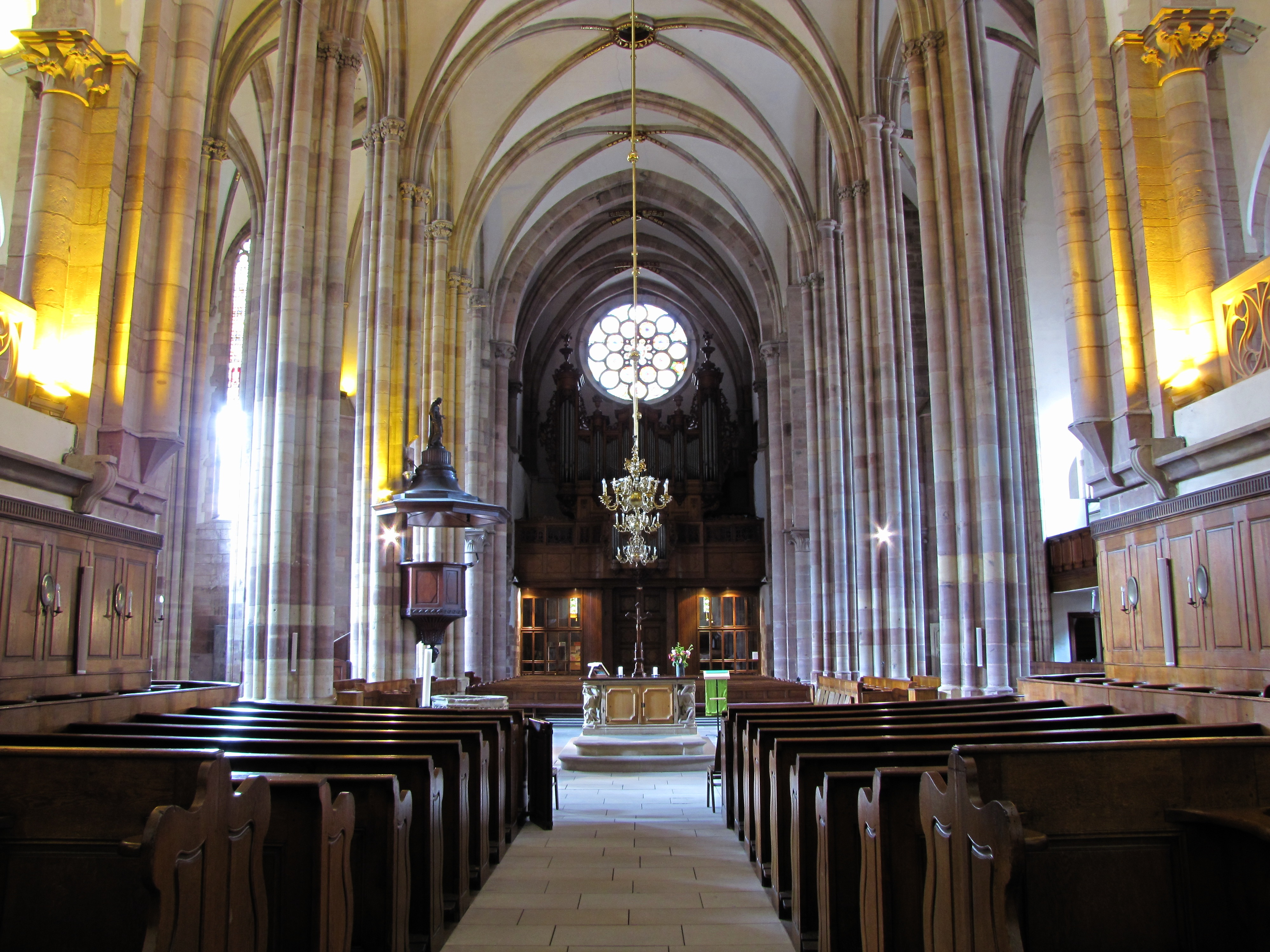
Nave of St. Thomas, Strasbourg

Konrad Hubert, also Konrad Huber, Konrad Huober, Konrad Humbert, Konrad Hunbart, Konrad Humpard, Pulbarba (a Latin translation of "Hunbart," lit. "chicken beard") or Ornipogon (from ὄρνῑς, "bird" and πώγων, "beard"),(1507 – 13 April 1577), was a German Reformed theologian, hymn writer and reformer. He was for 18 years the assistant of Martin Bucer at St. Thomas, Strasbourg.

== Life ==
Hubert was born in Bergzabern. He attended a school in Heidelberg from 1519. From 1526, he studied in Basel. He stayed with Johannes Oecolampadius who influenced him. He had the chance to meet numerous people with whom he corresponded later, including Johannes Oporinus, Thomas Plater and Johann Gast.

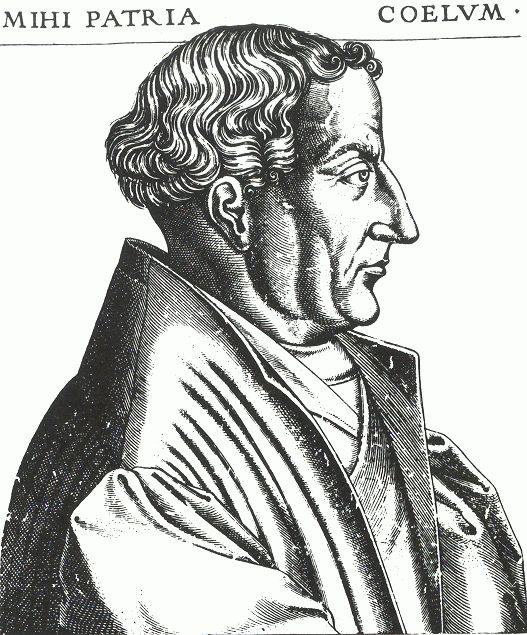
Martin Bucer at the age of 53, engraving by René Boyvin

After the battle at Kappel am Albis, Oecolampadius recommended him to his friend Martin Bucer who accepted him as his assistant (diaconus) in Strasbourg at St. Thomas. When Bucer was on his frequent travels, Hubert stepped in for him. Hubert worked for Bucer dutifully for 18 years. It was part of his job to make Bucer's ideas and concepts readable, because Bucer's handwriting was difficult to read. When Bucer left his post in 1549 and fled to England, Johann Marbach introduced Lutheranism. Hubert did not agree, he was expelled from the "Kirchenkonvent" in 1562 and was dismissed from St. Thomas in 1563. After that he worked as a free-lance preacher.

After Bucer's death in 1551, Hubert planned to publish Bucer's works which were extant in prints and manuscripts. He faced opposition and withdrew from church life more and more. In 1556 he seemed close to publishing the works with the help of Johannes Sturm at Oporinus in Basel. However, only the first volume was published, titled "Martini Buceri scripta Anglicana fere omnia" in 1577. Hubert edited the Strasbourg hymnals of 1560 and 1572. He died in Strasbourg.

Hubert was in contact with reformers across the continent and in England. He received letters from Henry Bullinger and Rudolph Gwalther the Elder, among others. Some of the letters he received from English reformers, which illuminate the relationships he fostered with other young protestants, have been translated in Rev. Hastings Robinson's Original Letters Relative to the English Reformation.

== Hymns ==
He is remembered for his hymns. He wrote the hymn "Allein zu dir, Herr Jesu Christ", published in 1540, used by Johann Sebastian Bach as the base for his chorale cantata Allein zu dir, Herr Jesu Christ, BWV 33, in 1724. Hubert's hymn "O Gott, du höchster Gnadenhort" is part of the hymnal of the Evangelical Church in Germany (EG 194).
