= Der Thurm zu Babel =

Opera by Anton Rubinstein

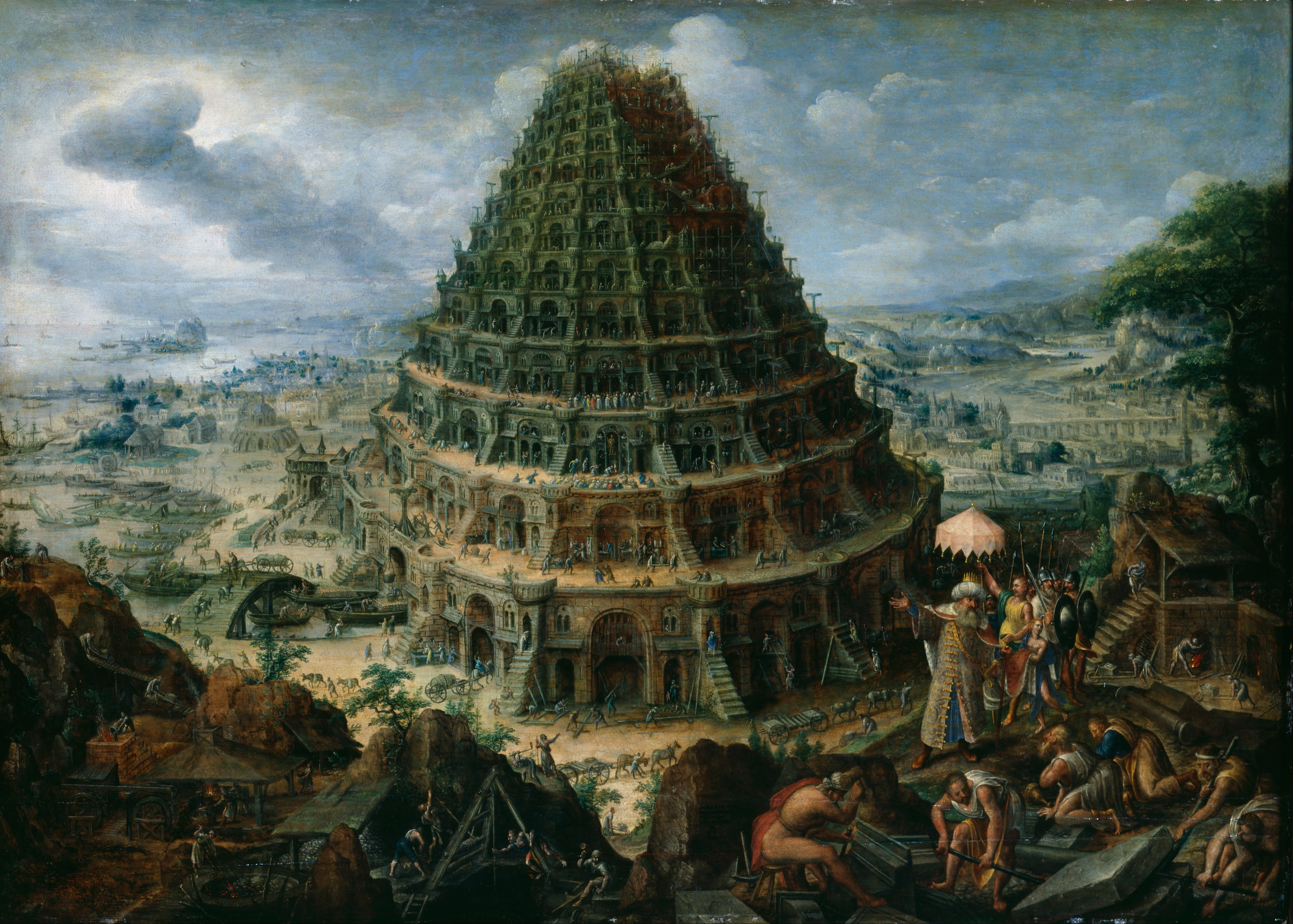
The Tower of Babel by Marten van Valckenborch (1595)

Der Thurm zu Babel (The Tower of Babel) is a one-act 'sacred opera' by Anton Rubinstein to a libretto by Julius Rodenberg based on the story in the Book of Genesis, chapter 11. The opera was written in 1869 and had its first performance in Königsberg on 9 February 1870.

== Background ==
The term 'sacred opera' (geistliche Oper in German) was invented by Rubinstein to denote staged works with "use of polyphonic choruses and a sober, edifying style relying on ‘exalted declamation’." Rubinstein composed three other works of this type (Sulamith, Moses and Christus). A fifth sacred opera, Cain, remained incomplete at the time of his death.

The composer had hoped for a premiere in Berlin, but was consoled by the work's second production in Vienna on 20 February 1870, (which was attended by Johannes Brahms), after which Rubinstein wrote it had been 'brilliantly performed and very well received by the public.' The work's first performance in America was in May 1881 in New York City, when it was conducted by Leopold Damrosch.

The destruction of the Tower in Der Thurm zu Babel is imaginatively realized by discordant passages in the orchestra (involving some passages in quintuple metre) and the chorus beginning to sing in three different languages. A typical performance lasts about 45 minutes.

== Roles ==
Role	Voice type	Premiere cast, 1870
Nimrod	bass	
Abraham	tenor	
Master Builder	baritone	
Four Angels	children's voices	
Chorus: Shemites, Hamites, Japhetites, demons, crowd etc.

== Synopsis ==
Nimrod and the Master Builder exult at the imminent success of their project to reach Heaven by building the Tower. Abraham rebukes them and is thrown into a fiery furnace at Nimrod's orders. As the workers praise Baal, angels descend and destroy the Tower, to the confusion of Nimrod and all present. Both the angels and the demons claim victory. 'As usual', Richard Taruskin has commented, 'the last-named get the most imaginative music'.

== Sources ==
- Graham Dixon and Richard Taruskin. "Sacred opera." Grove Music Online accessed 17 April 2010
- Carl Gerbrand, Sacred music drama: the producer's guide; second edition, Bloomington, 2006. Accessed in Google Books, April 18, 2010
- RICE, EDWIN T. (1942). "Personal Recollections of Leopold Damrosch". The Musical Quarterly. XXVIII (3). Oxford University Press (OUP): 269–275. doi:10.1093/mq/xxviii.3.269. ISSN 0027-4631.
- Richard Taruskin. Thurm zu Babel, Der. Grove Music Online accessed 18 April 2010
