= Wolfgang Helbich =

German conductor, musician and academic

- Born: 8 April 1943; Berlin, Prussia, German Reich
- Died: 8 April 2013 (aged 70); Kassel, Hesse, Germany
- Education: Musikhochschule Berlin; Musikhochschule Detmold
- Occupations: Church musician; Choral conductor; Academic
- Organizations: Alsfelder Vokalensemble; Bremer Domchor; Musikvereins der Stadt Bielefeld; Hochschule für Künste Bremen; Musikhochschule Saarbrücken; Bremer RathsChor
- Awards: Preis der deutschen Schallplattenkritik

Wolfgang Helbich (8 April 1943 – 8 April 2013) was a German church musician, a choral conductor and academic. He was the founder of the Alsfelder Vokalensemble and served as their conductor for decades, a group that toured internationally and received awards for their recordings. After retiring as a church musician, he also conducted the Bremer RathsChor.

== Life ==
Born in Berlin, Wolfgang Helbich studied music pedagogy and church music at the Musikhochschule Berlin and Musikhochschule Detmold. From 1969, he was church musician (Kantor) in Alsfeld. He founded in 1971 the Alsfelder Vokalensemble and conducted the vocal ensemble until his death. He moved in 1972 to the Grunewaldkirche in Berlin, also conducting the Berliner Kantorei. From 1976, he succeeded Hans Heintze at the Bremer Dom, conducting the Bremer Domchor, a position that he held until he retired in 2008, succeeded by Tobias Gravenhorst. In Bremen, he focused on performances of oratorios of the 18th and 19th centuries. He initiated an annual Musiknacht (Night of music) devoted to a specific composer. From 1999 to 2013, Helbich was also artistic director of the Musikverein der Stadt Bielefeld, conducting several concerts, often in the Rudolf Oetker Hall.

From 1974, Helbich recorded with the Alsfelder Vokalensemble and the Bremer Domchor numerous award-winning programs. They recorded apocryphal works by Johann Sebastian Bach in several volumes, including the cantata Uns ist ein Kind geboren, BWV 142.

Helbich was invited to conduct all over Europe, the US, Japan and Israel. He edited choral and organ works which were partly not published before. He was professor of choral conducting at the Hochschule für Künste Bremen and as a guest professor at the Musikhochschule Saarbrücken.

After his retirement, Helbich also conducted the Bremer RathsChor, founded in 2008 and including several former members of the Bremer Domchor. They performed demanding choral literature in performances that were regularly aired by Radio Bremen and Deutschlandradio Kultur. Helbich died in Kassel. He was succeeded in Alsfeld and for the Bremer RathsChor by Jan Hübner.

== Awards ==
Helbich received the Preis der deutschen Schallplattenkritik for his 2002 recording of Ein deutsches Requiem by Johannes Brahms with the Bremer Domchor and the Kammer Sinfonie Bremen.

== Recordings ==
Recordings by Helbich are held by the German National Library:

- Johann Stamitz: Missa solemnis in D major for soloists, choir and orchestra. cpo 1998
- Jubilate Deo. Polygram, Hamburg 1998
- Mendelssohn: Elias. Hilger Kespohl, Bünde 1999
- Georg Schumann: Geistliche Musik der Spätromantik. Horst Brauner, Berlin 1999
- Joseph von Eybler: Christmas Oratorio (Die Hirten bei der Krippe zu Bethlehem) cpo 1999
- Brahms: Ein deutsches Requiem. Musikproduktion Dabringhaus & Grimm (MDG), Detmold 2002 (Preis der deutschen Schallplattenkritik)
- Karl Martin Reinthaler: Jephta und seine Tochter. cpo 2004
- Weihnachten im Bremer Dom. cpo 2006
- The Sacred Apocryphal Bach Cantatas (cantatas, masses, motets) cpo 1992–2012
