= Das Käthchen von Heilbronn (opera) =

Das Käthchen von Heilbronn (1881) is a romantic opera in 4 acts by Carl Martin Reinthaler to a libretto by Heinrich Bulthaupt freely based on the drama Das Käthchen von Heilbronn by Heinrich von Kleist. Reinthaler began work on the project in 1875.
