= Dem Vaterland =

"Dem Vaterland" is a patriotic anthem written by Robert Reinick and set to music by Hugo Wolf.

== History ==
Wolf, who unsuccessfully attempted to dedicate Dem Vaterland to Emperor William II, originally wrote it as a song for tenor and piano in 1890, but later arranged it for male voices and orchestra. His personal love for the song is attested by the following letter he wrote to Melanie Köchert:

I was tremendously happy yesterday. I succeeded in writing another new song, but good heavens, what [a piece]!!! When the German emperor hears it, he’ll make me chancellor on the spot. It’s titled after Reinick’s “Dem Vaterland” and closes with the words “Heil dir, heil dir, du deutsches Land!” Well, one can scream “Heil dir” for a long time before it gets into the blood the way my music does. How I achieved this death-defying patriotic tone is a puzzle to me. By this time, I’m starting to think I can do just about anything.

== Text ==
Dem Vaterland!
Das ist ein hohes helles Wort,
Das hallt durch unsre Herzen fort
Wie Waldesrauschen, Glockenklang,
Drommetenschmettern, Lerchensang,
Das fällt ein Blitz in unsre Brust,
Zu heil’ger Flamme wird die Lust!
Dem Vaterland!

Dem Vaterland!
Das Wort gibt Flügel dir, o Herz!
Flieg auf, flieg auf, schau niederwärts
Die Wälder, Ströme, Tal und Höh’n:
O deutsches Land, wie bist du schön!
Und überall klingt Liederschall
Und überall ein Widerhall:
Dem Vaterland!

Dem Vaterland!
Das seinen Töchtern hat beschert
Der keuschen Liebe stillen Herd,
Das seinen Söhnen gab als Hort
Die freie Tat, das treue Wort,
Das seiner Ehren blanken Schild
Zu wahren allzeit sei gewillt,
Dem Vaterland!

Dem Vaterland!
O hohes Wort, o helles Wort,
Du tön’ für alle Zeiten fort
Wie Waldesrauschen, Glockenklang,
Drommetenschmettern, Lerchensang!
Zu heil’ger Flamme weih’ die Lust,
So lange schlägt die deutsche Brust
Dem Vaterland!

Heil dir! Heil dir du deutsches Land!

Fatherland!
A bright and lofty word,
That echoes through our hearts
Like rustling woods and ringing bells,
Blaring trumpets and lark song,
That flashes like lightning in our breasts,
Changing joy into sacred flame!
Fatherland!

Fatherland!
The word gives thee wings, O heart!
Fly up, fly up, look down
On forests, rivers, valleys and hills:
O German land, how faire thou art!
And everywhere songs resound
And echo everywhere:
Fatherland!

Fatherland!
That gave its daughters
The silent hearth of chaste love,
That gave its sons as sanctuary
Free deeds and loyal words,
That they might always strive to hold aloft
The fatherland’s shining shield of honour,
Fatherland!

Fatherland!
O bright and lofty word,
Sound forth for evermore
Like rustling woods and ringing bells,
Blaring trumpets and lark song!
Dedicate all joy to this sacred flame,
As long as German hearts beat
For the fatherland!

Hail to thee! Hail, O German land!
