= Hermann Lingg =

German poet

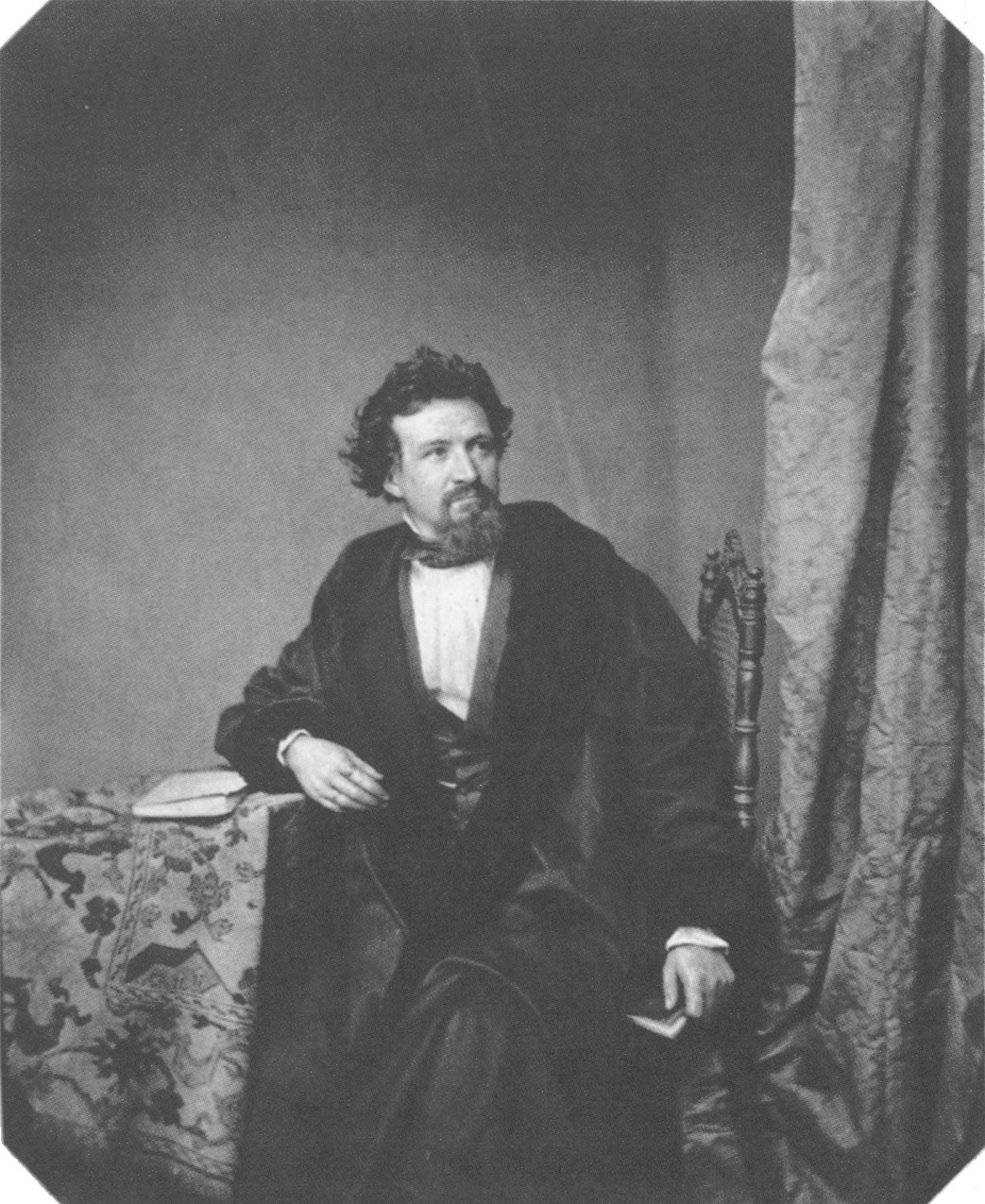
Hermann Lingg, ca. 1860

Hermann (Ritter von) Lingg (22 January 1820 – 18 June 1905) was a German poet who also wrote plays and short stories. His cousin, Maximilian von Lingg, was Bishop of Augsburg.

He was born in Lindau. Lingg studied medicine at the universities of Munich, Freiburg, Berlin, and Prague, and became a doctor in the Bavarian Army. From 1839, he was a member of the Corps Suevia München. His battalion was used to quell revolutionary uprisings in Baden; forced to act against his convictions, he fell into severe depression, entered a mental hospital in 1851 and soon submitted his resignation. From that point on, he lived in Munich and devoted himself to historical and poetic studies, financially supported by King Maximilian II. His marriage to a forester's daughter in 1854 improved his mental stability, and a pension (with occasional financial support from friends, such as Max von Pettenkofer and Justus von Liebig, and the German Schiller Foundation) improved their living standards.

Lingg first gained attention with a collection of poems introduced by Emanuel Geibel (Stuttgart 1853). His most famous work is Die Völkerwanderung ("The Great Migration", Stuttgart, 1866–68, 3 vols). He was ennobled in 1890.

His poem "Immer leiser wird mein Schlummer" was set by Johannes Brahms as No. 2 of his Fünf Lieder, Op. 105 and Max Bruch’s cantata Salamis is based on another of his poems. His manuscripts are now located in the Bavarian State Library. There are streets named after him in both Munich and Lindau.

== Works ==
- Catilina, 1864
- Die Walküren, 1865
- Vaterländische Balladen und Gesänge, 1868
- Liebesblüten aus Deutschlands Dichterhain, lyrical collection, 1869
- Gedichte, 3rd book, 1870
- Zeitgedichte, 1870
- Wanderungen durch die internationale Kunstausstellung in München, 1870
- Violante, tragedy, 1871
- Dunkle Gewalten, epic poetry, 1872
- Die Besiegung der Cholera, play, 1873
- Der Doge Candiano, 1873
- Berthold Schwarz, 1874
- Die Sizilianische Vesper, 1876
- Macalda, tragedy, 1877
- Schlusssteine, poems, 1878
- Byzantinische Novellen, stories, 1881
- Von Wald und See, stories, 1883
- Clytia. Eine Szene aus Pompeji, 1883
- Skaldenklänge, collection of ballads by contemporary poets (with Gräfin Ballestrem), 1883
- Högnis letzte Heerfahrt. Nordische Szene, 1884
- Lyrisches, poems, 1885
- Die Bregenzer Klause, 1887
- Meine Lebensreise, autobiography, 1899

== Bibliography ==
- Emil Pfaff: Hermann Lingg als epischer Dichter. Ebering, Berlin 1925.
- Frieda Port: Hermann Lingg. Eine Lebensgeschichte. Beck, München 1912.
- Walter Knote: Hermann Lingg und seine lyrische Dichtung. Mayr, Würzburg 1936.
- Arnulf Sonntag: Hermann Lingg als Lyriker. Lindauer, München 1908.
- Manfred Zschiesche: Hermann Lingg. Eine Erscheing des deutschen Spätklassizismus. Mit besonderer Berücksichtigung seiner Dramen. Korn, Breslau 1940.
