= Robert Reinick =

German painter

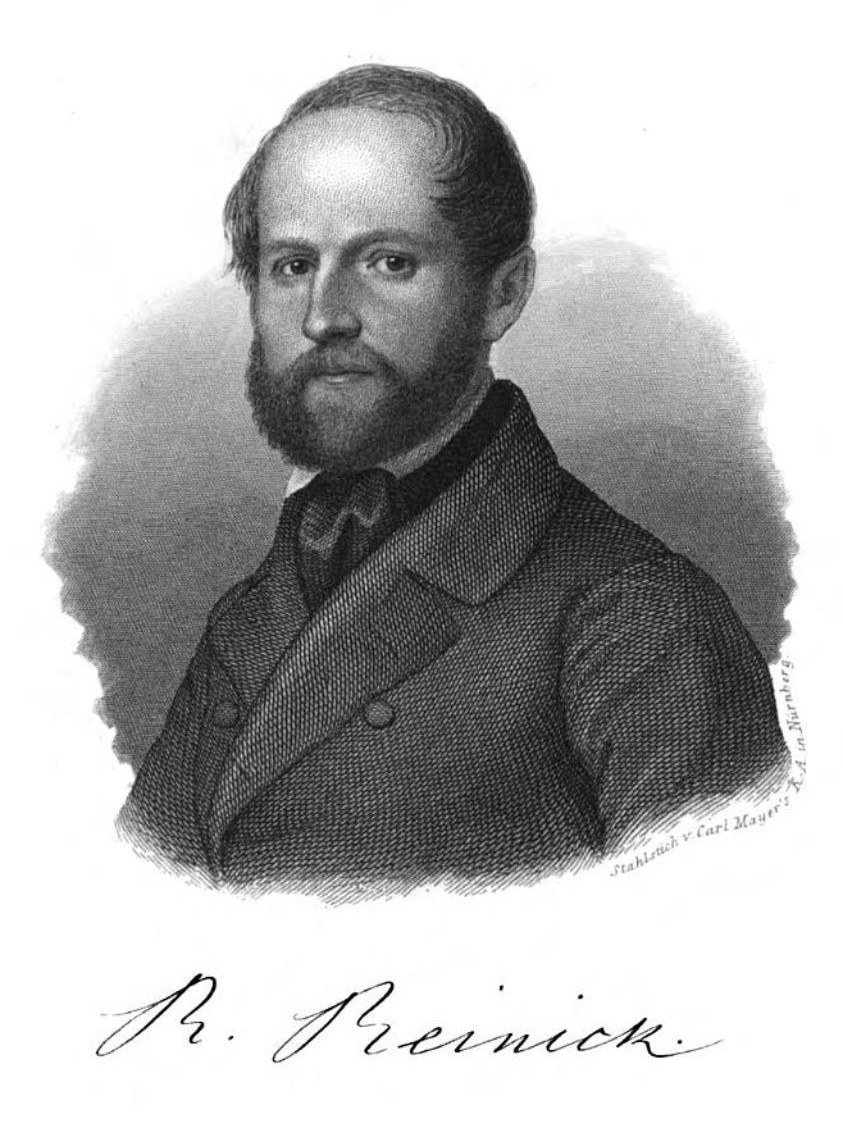
Robert Reinick.

Robert Reinick (22 February 1805 – 7 February 1852) was a German painter and poet, associated with the Düsseldorf school of painting. One of his poems, Dem Vaterland, was set to music by Hugo Wolf and another, The Flight into Egypt was the libretto for a cantata by Max Bruch. He wrote the libretto to Schumann's opera Genoveva.

Reinick was born in Danzig (Gdańsk) and died in Dresden.
