= Carl Martin Reinthaler =

German organist, conductor and composer

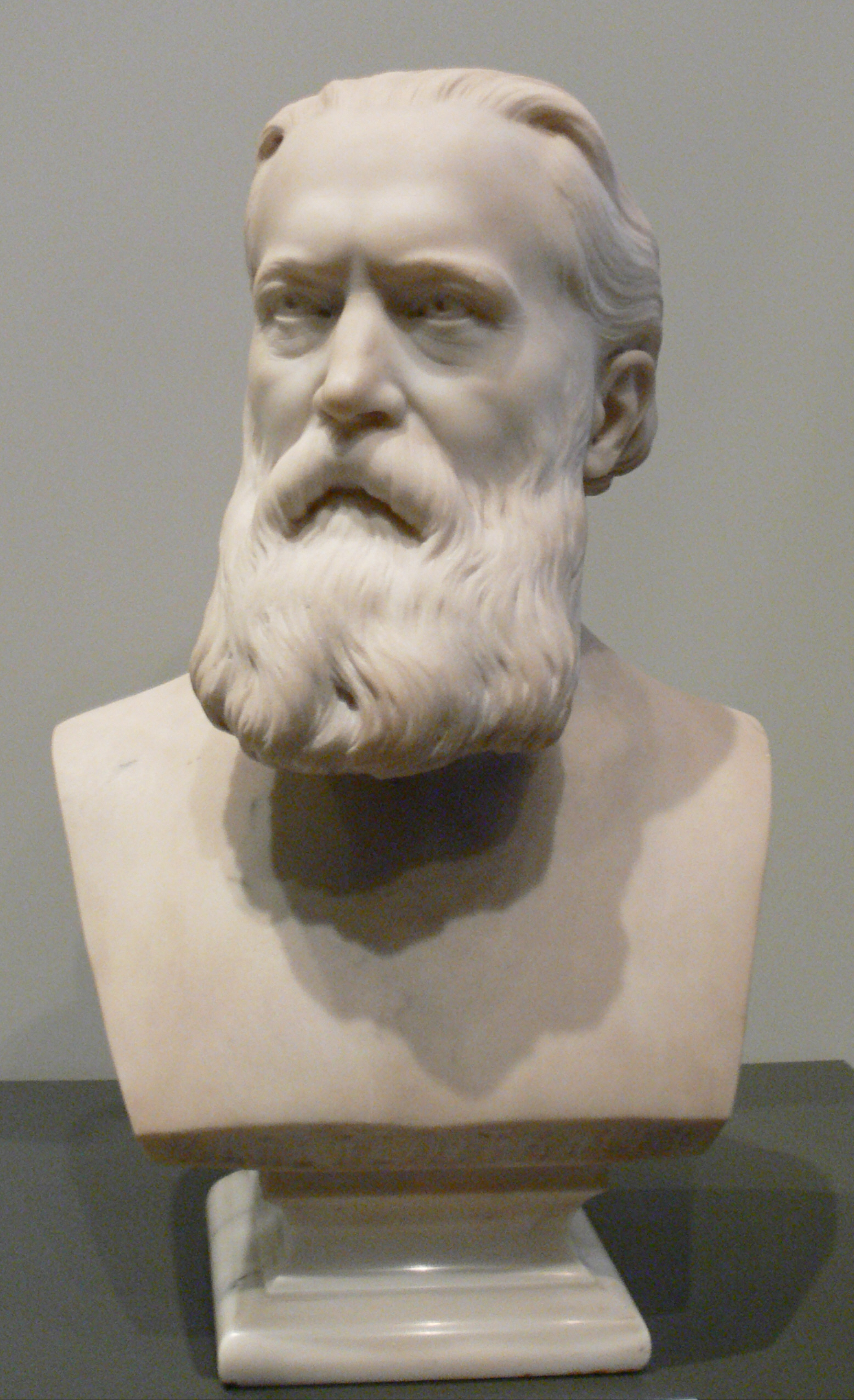
Bust by Diedrich Samuel Kropp, 1902

Carl Martin Reinthaler (13 October 1822 – 13 February 1896) was a German organist, conductor and composer.

Alternative spellings include Karl Martin Reinthaler and Carl Martin Rheinthaler.

== Biography ==
Reinthaler was born in Erfurt. He received his first music education from August Gottfried Ritter, an organist at Magdeburg Cathedral. He studied theology, and then music with Adolf Bernhard Marx, studying from 1849 to 1852 in Paris and Rome with a royal scholarship.

He was associated with the Bremen Cathedral, of which he was director, chorus master of the Singakademie Bremen, and cathedral organist since 1857. A friend of Johannes Brahms, with whom he corresponded, he was responsible for the Bremen performance of A German Requiem. Reinthaler also conducted the premiere of the revised version of Max Bruch's first violin concerto in January 1868.

In later years, Reinthaler required a wheel chair, which limited his appearances in public musical scenes. He died in Bremen.

== Works ==
- Jephtha und seine Tochter. Oratorio in two parts
- Das Käthchen von Heilbronn. Opera in four acts
- Choral works:
  - Fünf Sprüche und ein Weihnachtslied op. 50. Bremen, Praeger & Meier
  - Eile, Gott, mich zu erretten (Psalm 70)
  - Frohlocket mit Händen, alle Völker (Psalm 47) op. 18, 2
  - Lobe den Herrn, meine Seele (Psalm 103) op.40
  - Lobet den Herrn, alle Heiden (Psalm 117)
  - Meine Seele verlanget und sehnet sich (Psalm 42)
  - Wenn der Herr die Gefangenen Zions (Psalm 126)
- Symphony, in D (opus 12)

=== Recordings ===
- Das Käthchen von Heilbronn. Richard Carlucci, Ilia Papandreou, Peter Schöne, Mate Solyom-Nagy, Marisca Mulder, Erfurt PO, Samuel Bächli cpo 2012
- Jephta und seine Tochter. Sabine Ritterbusch, Konstanze Maxsein, Waltraud Hoffmann-Mucher, Jürgen Sacher, Richard Salter, Oliver Zwarg, Bremer Domchor, Kammer Sinfonie Bremen, Wolfgang Helbich cpo 1997

== Sources ==
- Carl Martin Reinthaler, in particular this version
- Andreas Moser (ed.) Johannes Brahms Briefwechsel, Zweiter Band, vol. vi, Berlin, 1912, p. 49
- Oliver Schwarz-Roosmann: Carl Martin Reinthaler. Lebensweg eines Bremer Musikdirektors. Verlag Lit, Münster, Hamburg, London 2003, ISBN 3-8258-6813-3
- Christian Kämpf und Arne Langer: Carl Reinthaler. Zwischen Orgelempore und Orchestergraben. Bremen: Schünemann, 2022. ISBN 978-3-7961-1156-3.
- Arne Langer: Der Musiker-Nachlass von Carl Martin Reinthaler. In: Bremisches Jahrbuch 100 (2021). S. 112–119.
