= Kaisermarsch =

1871 patriotic march by Richard Wagner

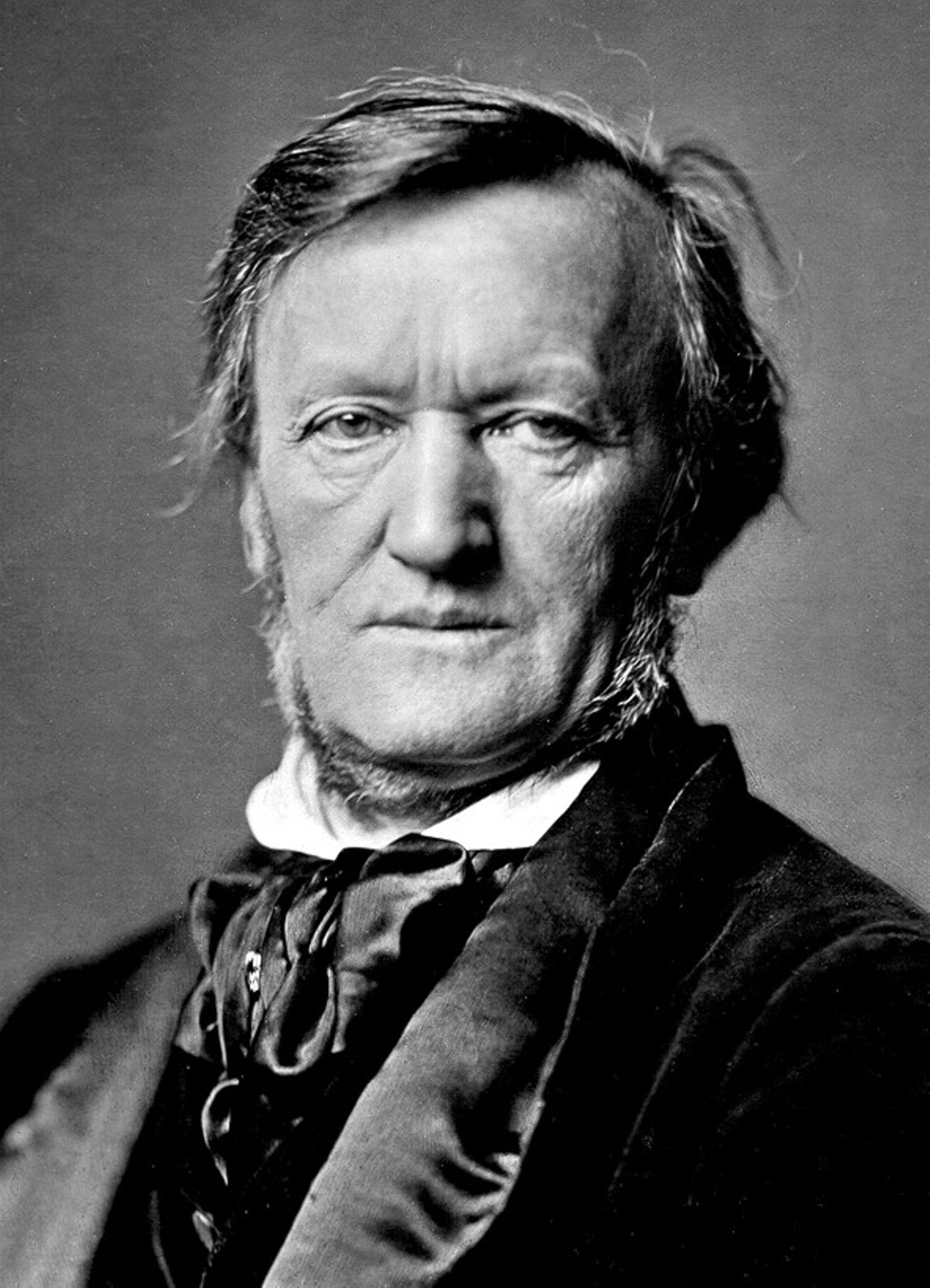
Richard Wagner in 1871

The Kaisermarsch (Imperial March) is a patriotic march composed by Richard Wagner in 1871 in order to exalt the foundation of the German Empire after the victorious Franco-Prussian War.

== History ==
The victory in the Franco-Prussian War and the consequent proclamation of William I, King of Prussia, as German Emperor spurred patriotism and incited several German composers to write patriotic music dedicated to the nation and the new empire. Johannes Brahms, for example, wrote his Song of Triumph (op. 55) in 1871.

Wagner, already known for his musical patriotism in several of his operas, hence composed the Kaisermarsch which entailed both positive and negative reviews but did not succeed in attaining a more prominent status with regard to official ceremonies celebrating the newly achieved victory. Wagner wrote:

After the return of our victorious army, I made private inquiries in Berlin whether, in case a grand ceremonial in honour of the fallen soldiers were projected, I could be permitted to provide a piece suited to such a solemn occasion. But I was told that it was not considered desirable to make special provision for painful impressions to accompany the joyous return of the army. I proposed, still privately, another piece, which was to accompany the entrance of the army, and into which, at the close, — say in defiling before the victorious monarch, — the excellent vocal corps of the Prussian army might join with some popular melody. But this would have necessitated serious changes in the arrangements that had been completed long before, and I was dissuaded from my project. Consequently, I arranged my Kaisermarsch for the concert-hall, for which let it be adapted as well as may be.

Wagner's estranged friend Friedrich Nietzsche wrote derisively of the work, that "to Wagner's Kaisermarsch, not even the young German Kaiser [i.e. Wilhelm II] could march".

== Text ==
The text of the march did not become popular, and is rarely sung when the Imperial March is performed nowadays. The main reason for this is the low quality of the text, which emanates from the fact that it was written after the composition of the tune and thus had to be "trimmed" in order to fit the melody.

German

Kaiserlied.
(für das Heer.)

Heil! Heil dem Kaiser!
König Wilhelm!
Aller Deutschen Hort und Freiheitswehr!
Höchste der Kronen,
Wie ziert Dein Haupt sie hehr!
Ruhmreich gewonnen
soll Frieden Dir lohnen!
Der neu ergrünten Eiche gleich
erstand durch Dich das Deutsche Reich:
Heil seinen Ahnen,
seinen Fahnen,
die Dich führten, die wir trugen,
als mit Dir wir Frankreich schlugen!
Feind zum Trutz,
Freund zum Schutz,
allem Volk das Deutsche Reich
zu Heil und Nutz!

English

Song for the Emperor
(for the army.)

Hail! Hail to the Emperor
King William!
Shield and bulwark of all Germans′ freedom!
Loftiest of crowns,
how augustly it adorns thy brow!
Thou hast gloriously triumphed!
May peace be thy reward!
Like the oak, newly turned green,
the German Empire arose because of thee:
Hail to its ancestors,
its banners,
that led thee, and that we flew,
when we, together with thee, fought France!
May the German Empire be
Defence against the foe,
Protection for the friend
And salvation for the entire people!

== Patriotic Wagnerian Music ==
Another patriotic piece by Wagner is Hans Sachs′s final monologue in Die Meistersinger when he warns his fellow Germans to protect German culture from foreign influence:

Verachtet mir die Meister nicht
Und ehrt mir ihre Kunst!
Was ihnen hoch zum Lobe spricht,
Fiel reichlich Euch zur Gunst.
Nicht Euren Ahnen, noch so wert,
Nicht Eurem Wappen, Speer noch Schwert,
Dass Ihr ein Dichter seid,
Ein Meister Euch gefreit,
Dem dankt Ihr heut Eu′r höchstes Glück.
Drum denkt mit Dank Ihr dran zurück,
Wie kann die Kunst wohl unwert sein,
Die solche Preise schließet ein?
Dass unsre Meister sie gepflegt
Grad recht nach ihrer Art,
Nach ihrem Sinne treu gehegt,
Das hat sie echt bewahrt:
Blieb sie nicht adlig, wie zur Zeit,
Da Höf′ und Fürsten sie geweiht,
Im Drang der schlimmen Jahr
Blieb sie doch deutsch und wahr;
Und wär sie anders nicht geglückt,
Als wie, wo alles drängt und drückt,
Ihr seht, wie hoch sie blieb in Ehr′:
Was wollt Ihr von den Meistern mehr?
Habt Acht! Uns dräuen üble Streich −
Zerfällt erst deutsches Volk und Reich
In falscher welscher Majestät,
Kein Fürst bald mehr sein Volk versteht,
Und welschen Dunst mit welschem Tand
Sie pflanzen uns in deutsches Land;
Was deutsch und echt, wüsst′ keiner mehr,
Lebt′s nicht in deutscher Meister Ehr′.
Drum sag ich Euch:
Ehrt Eure deutschen Meister!
Dann bannt Ihr gute Geister;
Und gebt Ihr ihrem Wirken Gunst,
Zerging in Dunst
Das heil′ge röm′sche Reich,
Uns bliebe gleich
Die heil′ge deutsche Kunst!

In the third act of Lohengrin, King Henry praises the Germans of Brabant and their will to defend the Empire against Hungarian attacks:

German

DAS VOLK
Heil, König Heinrich,
König Heinrich, Heil!

KÖNIG HEINRICH
Habt Dank, ihr Lieben von Brabant.
Wie fühl ich stolz mein Herz entbrannt,
Find ich in jedem deutschen Land
So kräftig reichen Heerverband.
Nun soll des Reiches Feind sich nah′n.
Wir wollen tapfer ihn empfah′n.
Aus seinem öden Horst daher
Soll er sich nimmer wagen mehr.
Für deutsches Land das deutsche Schwert,
So sei des Reiches Kraft bewährt.

DAS VOLK
Für deutsches Land das deutsche Schwert,
So sei des Reiches Kraft bewährt.

English

ALL THE MEN
Hail, King Henry!
King Henry, hail!

KING HEINRICH
I thank you, my loving subjects of Brabant!
How I would feel my heart swell with pride
to find in every German land
so many valiant forces!
Now let out kingdom′s foe draw near
and we will boldly meet him:
from his Eastern desert he shall never more
dare to venture here!
For German land the German sword!
Thus may our kingdom′s strength be ensured!

THE PEOPLE
For German land the German sword!
Thus may our kingdom's strength be ensured!
