= Bremer Domchor =

- Choir
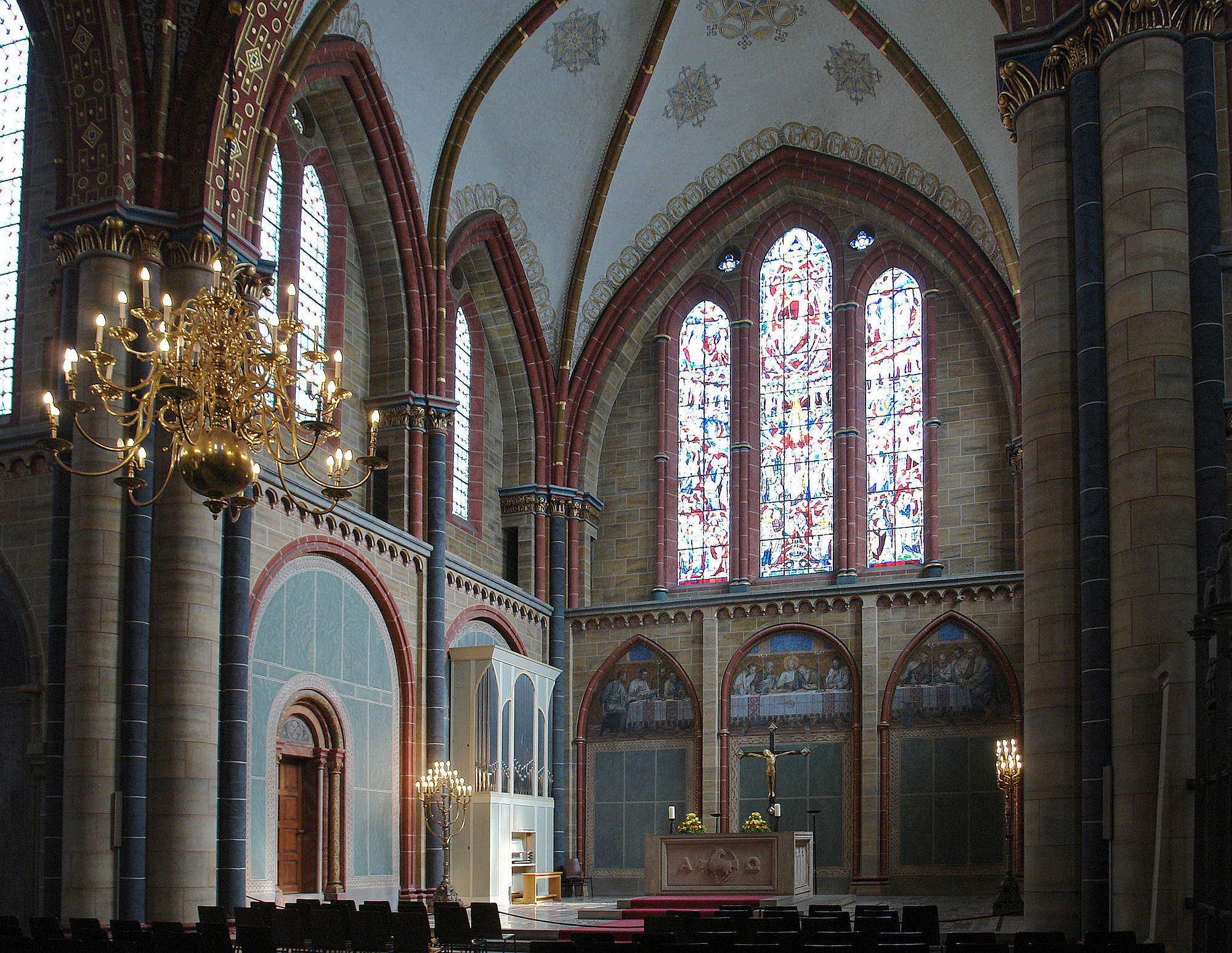
- Choir of the Bremer Dom
- Origin: Bremen, Germany
- Founded: 1856
- Genre: Mixed choir
- Members: 120
- Chief conductor: Tobias Gravenhorst

The Bremer Domchor (Bremen Cathedral Choir) is a mixed choir at the Protestant Bremen Cathedral in Bremen, Germany.

== History ==
The first choir at the Dom was founded in 1684 by the theologian and church musician Laurentius Laurentii, who was responsible for music at the Domschule Bremen and the Dommusik. Today's choir was founded in 1856 by Heinrich Kurth (1828–1872), the music teacher at the Domschule. He was succeeded by Carl Martin Reinthaler (1858–1893), Eduard Nößler (1893–1929), Richard Liesche (1930–1957), Hans Heintze (1958–1975), Wolfgang Helbich (1976–2008) and Tobias Gravenhorst (from 2008).

The choir has around 120 members. They perform six to eight concerts per year, also many services. Several events have been recorded or broadcast. The choir has performed in the US and Israel, and several times in France, Italy and Eastern Europe.
