= The Fiery Cross (Bruch) =

Cantata composed by Max Bruch

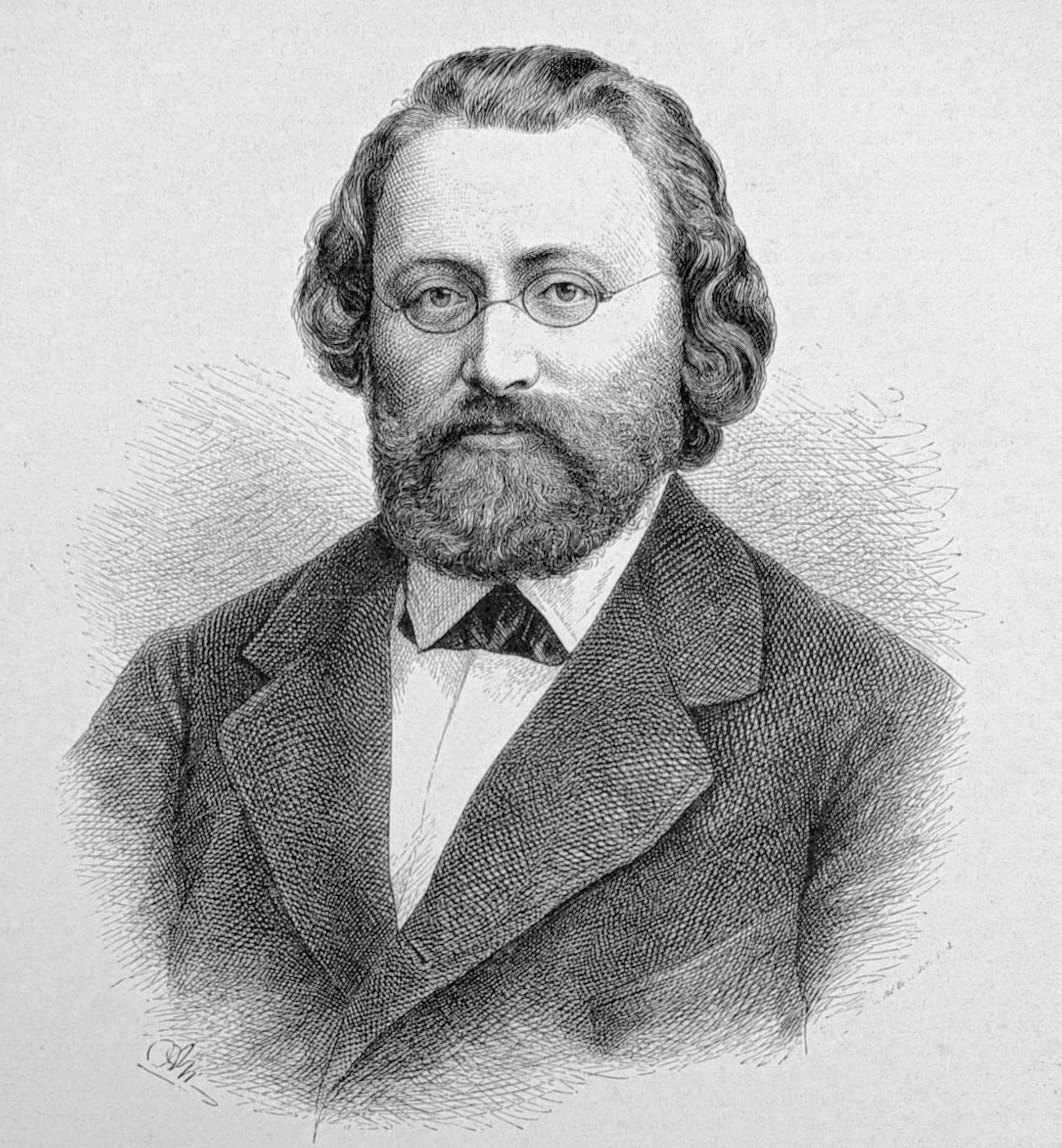
Max Bruch, 1881

The Fiery Cross, Op. 52 (German: Das Feuerkreuz; 1889) is a cantata for soprano, baritone, bass, mixed chorus, and orchestra (2.2.2.2(=dbn)-4.2.3.1-timp.perc:1-harp-org-strings) composed by Max Bruch. (Note: see explanation at Shorthand for orchestra instrumentation) It was first performed on 26 February 1889 in Breslau. It is based on a motif from Sir Walter Scott's Lady of the Lake with words by Heinrich Bulthaupt. The action concerns the main character, Norman (baritone), who is summoned to join a rebel army as he comes out of church at his own wedding. The other soloists are Mary, just bride, and Angus (bass), who hurries in bearing the fiery cross that is the signal that the rebels are mustering. Ferdinand Pfohl said of the work: "The Fiery Cross does not represent any kind of artistic progress: the public too seemed to feel this when it was meagre in its applause, so that the composer, who was conducting, felt the need to darken his brow."

Bruch originally intended to dedicate the work to the new Kaiser, Wilhelm II but changed his mind, commenting that Wilhelm’s tastes in music were limited to "the blarings of massed trumpets", and "an unhealthy appetite for (Wagner’s) world of dragons, dwarfs, giants and supermen." instead, he dedicated it to the Breslau Sing-Akademie. After its premiere in that city, The Fiery Cross was performed in Rotterdam, Leipzig, Magdeburg, Barmen, Bonn and Riga in the summer of 1899.

The first of the work’s eight scenes sees a bridal boat crossing a quiet lake at dawn: the bride (soprano solo) and groom (baritone solo) are greeted in two wedding choruses. The wedding takes place in a woodland chapel, accompanied by the orchestra and a bell. Then, a neighboring chieftain (bass solo) appears holding a flaming cross, and demands that the groom carry the cross to the next chieftain. One chorus urged him to stay while another presses him to leave; eventually he says a reluctant farewell to his new bride. At the end of the third scene the women’s chorus comforts her, and the groom sings a lengthy solo. The following scenes contrast the groom’s journey carrying the flaming cross over the Scottish highlands with a quiet apparition of the Virgin Mary, and the work ends with a battle and triumphal chorus.

Bruch was dissatisfied with the translation of the work into English by Caroline Holland, who took it upon herself to "put the work under a Scottish magnifying glass from A to Z and corrected it as one would correct the bad exercises of a music student."

The Ave Maria from this work is often sung on its own and was subsequently published separately (as Op. 52 No. 6). Bruch sent a copy of it to Nellie Melba at her request when she was visiting Berlin in 1900. In 1892 he also adapted the piece for solo cello and orchestra and published it as Op. 61.
