= Gustav Pfarrius =

German writer

August Konrad Gustav Pfarrius (31 December 1800 – 15 August 1884) was a German poet and teacher, celebrated as the „Sänger des Nahetals“ after his homeland on the left bank of the Rhine.

Born in Hedessheim near Bad Kreuznach, he interrupted theological studies in Halle and moved to Bonn to take up Latin, French and history with Ernst Moritz Arndt, becoming acquainted with Hoffmann von Fallersleben, Karl Simrock and Heinrich Heine. Appointments to teaching positions took him to Saarbrücken (1823) and Köln (1834): in 1858 he built a villa, Haus Herresberg, near Remagen.

He is remembered in the English-speaking world for three songs set by Robert Schumann as Opus 119. Another of his songs was set to music by Max Bruch.
