= Hans Heintze =

German Kator and organist

Hans Heintze (4 February 1911 – 5 March 2003) was a German Kantor and organist.

== Life ==
Born in Wehre, Lower Saxony, Heintze grew up in Bremen, where he received his Abitur at the Altes Gymnasium. In 1929, he began studying classical philology at the University of Leipzig. Later he moved to study church music at the University of Music and Theatre Leipzig, which he completed with Günther Ramin (organ) and Carl Adolf Martienssen (piano). Fritz Reuter was also one of his teachers in Leipzig.

In 1930, he became the permanent assistant to Thomasorganist Ramin. After first positions as cantor and organist in Bad Oldesloe (1932–1934) and as cathedral cantor at the Sophienkirche in Dresden (1934–1939), Heintze succeeded Günther Ramin in 1940 as organist of the Thomaskirche in Leipzig. There, he worked, with interruptions, until 1948. During his war service in the Wehrmacht and Soviet captivity, Heintze was assisted by Eberhard Bonitz (1941), Eduard Büchsel (1941–1942), Beate Schmidt (1942–1943), Günter Metz (1942, 1943–1944), Christian Göttsching (1944), Christa Wildeis (1944–1949) and Ekkehard Tietze (1948–1949). He also led the teachers' choral society in Leipzig.

From 1949, he was first church musician at St. John's Church, Lüneburg and in 1955 professor at the Hochschule für Musik "Hanns Eisler" in Berlin. Heintze succeeded Richard Liesche as senior church musician and cathedral cantor at the Bremen St. Petri Dom and director of the Bremer Domchor. He worked together with the organist Wilhelm Evers. Heintze worked at Bremen's St. Peter's Cathedral until 1975, when he retired for reasons of age and his post was taken over by Wolfgang Helbich. In addition, Heintze worked at the University of the Arts Bremen as Hochschullehrer.

Heintze died in Bremen at the age of 92.

== Recordings ==
- Johann Sebastian Bach: Matthäuspassion. Calig-Verlag, Munich, 1987
- Chormusik zur Weihnacht. Dabringhaus + Grimm, Detmold; EMI-Electrola ASD, Cologne, 1984
- Vom ewigen Zauber barocker Orgeln. Deutsche Grammophon, Hamburg, 1981
- Johann Sebastian Bach: Orgelwerke. Johannes Stauda, Kassel, 1980–1981
- Festliche Musik zur Weihnachtszeit. Deutsche Schallplatten, Berlin, 1978
- Wolfgang Amadeus Mozart: Requiem in d-moll KV 626. Sound-Star-Tonproduction, Steyerberg, 1976
- Antonín Dvořák: Stabat mater, B 71. Sound-Star-Tonproduction, Steyerberg, 1975
- Johann Pachelbel: Orgelwerke. Deutsche Grammophon, Hamburg, 1967 and 1982
