= Odysseus (oratorio) =

Secular oratorio (Op. 41) composed by Max Bruch

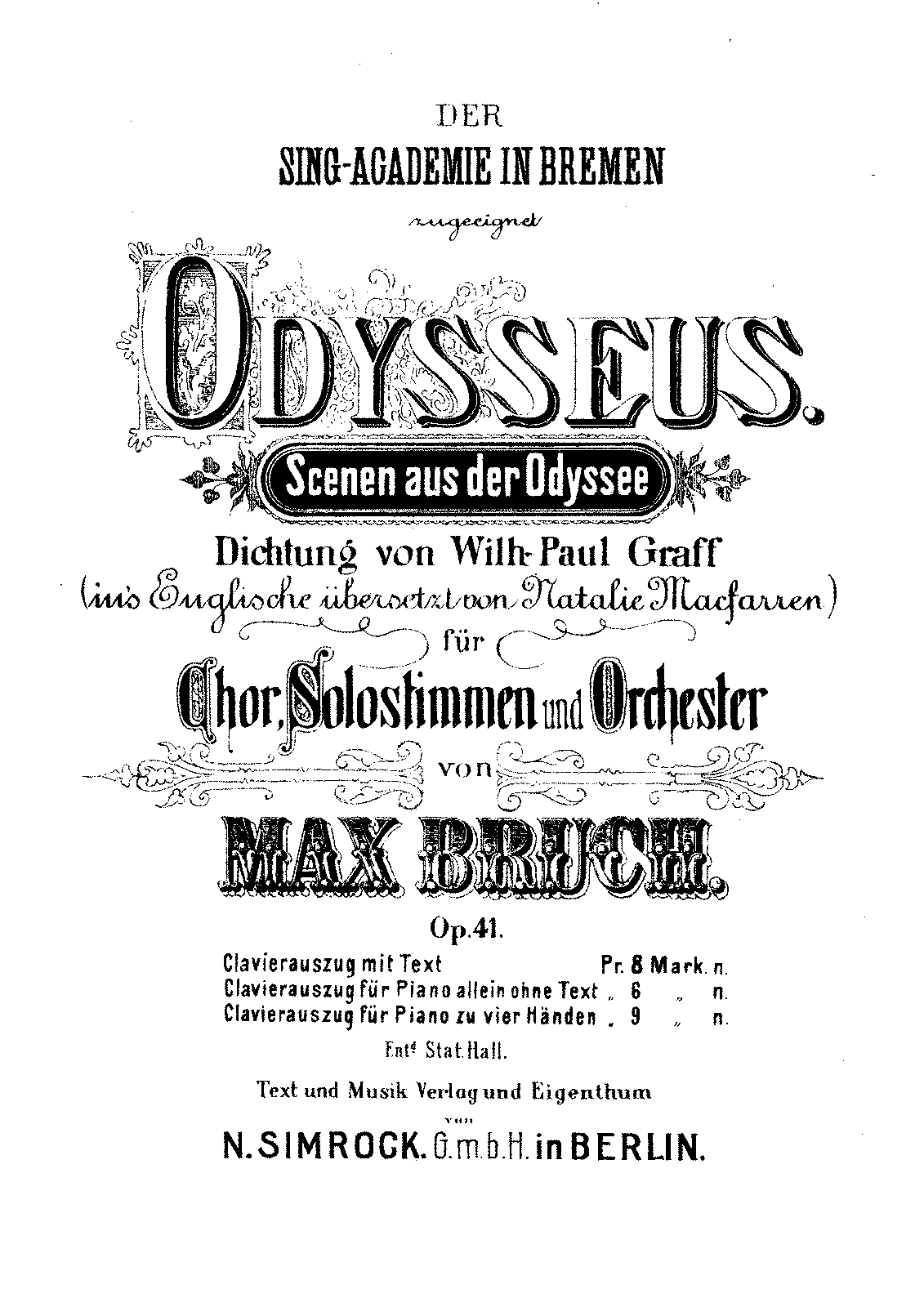
Frontispiece of the first edition of Bruch's Odysseus

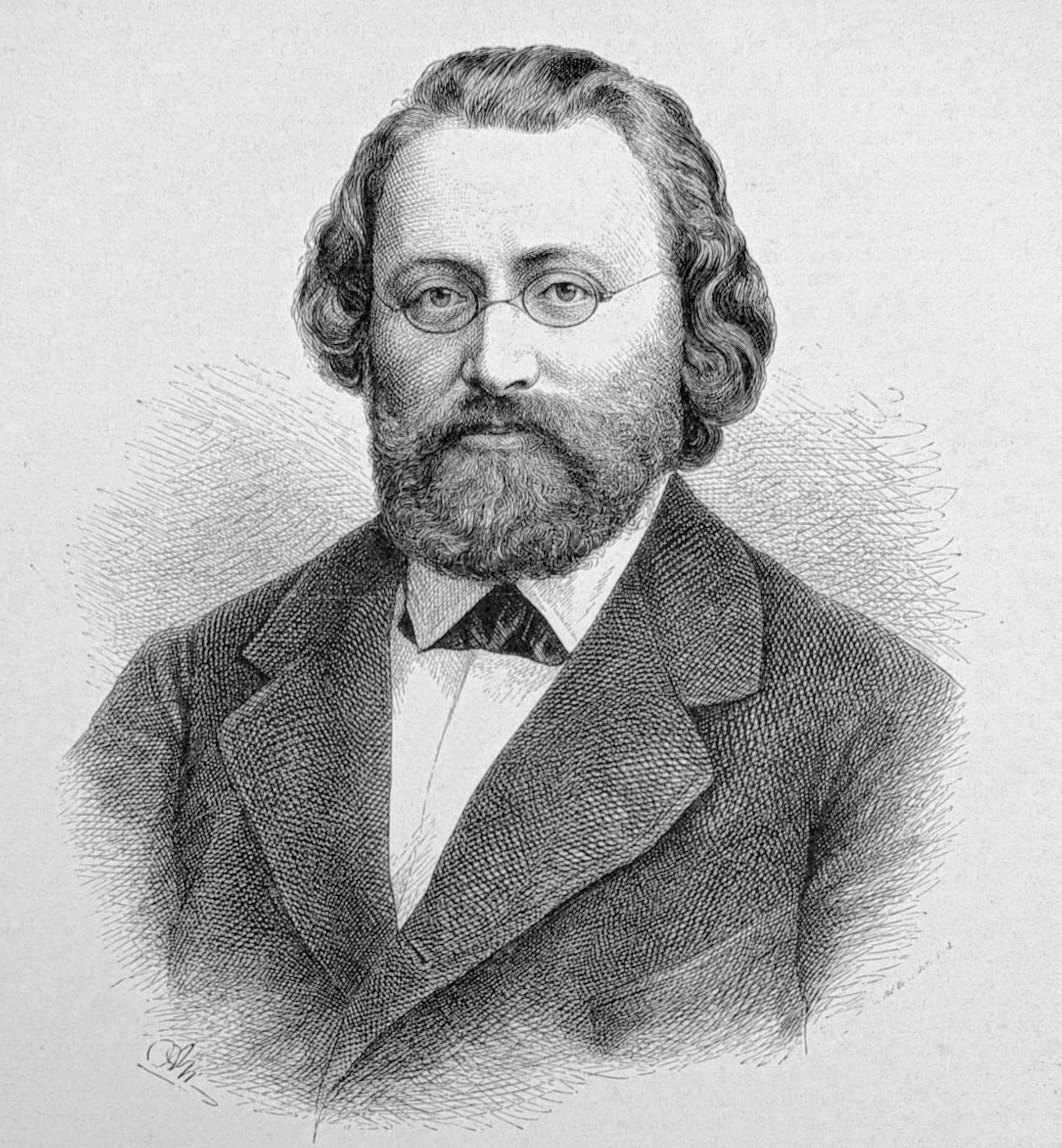
Max Bruch

Odysseus: Szenen aus der Odyssee für Chor, Solostimmen und Orchester (Odysseus: Scenes from the Odyssey for Choir, Solo Voices and Orchestra) is a secular oratorio (Op. 41) composed by Max Bruch and first performed in 1873. It was Bruch's most successful work in his own lifetime. German unification created a wave of patriotic euphoria across the country, and French war reparations created an economic windfall. The time was right for a new work with a theme of the love of homeland. It was popular in Germany and internationally and brought Bruch to Liverpool.

== Composition ==
It occurred to Bruch to adapt the Homeric epic in September 1871 while he was searching for a new libretto. As he said “The splendor of this primeval work of poetry became so clear to me that I could no longer dispel the thought of turning it into a series of lyrical scenes... The musical image of the entire work, its form, appeared clearly before my mind’s eye before I had written a single note.” He entrusted the work of transforming this detailed outline into a complete work to the librettist Wilhelm Paul Graff. Bruch's work on Odysseus (“a pleasure impossible to describe”) proceeded quickly and he had completed it by November 1872. A performance of the six scenes he had completed to date was staged in Bremen on 6 May 1872. When the work was published, it came out with French and English translations (by Natalia Macfarren) as well as the original German.

== Setting and significance ==
Writing to his sister in 1871, Bruch said that he had selected Homer's narrative as in preference to a religious theme offering the ‘Christian lamentation and the poetic tears of Bach’s cantatas.” In 1873, writing to his publisher Simrock, Bruch said, "Biblical subjects have remained and still remain alien to me; the old Masters have produced so many powerful works in this area (i.e. sacred oratorio) that it is possible for us to create independent and original works only in conjunction with other subjects. It is not accidental that all oratorio projects since Mendelssohn have failed." (Later in his career Bruch did however compose oratorios on religious themes).

The classical setting was significant; it represented an alternative mythological universe to the Norse themes of Richard Wagner. In contrast to the nationalist mysticism of Wagner, the classical world embodied the hopes of German liberals that the new Reich would become an enlightened, new-classical civilisation.

== Structure ==
The work is divided into twelve episodes:

1. Orchestral Introduction
2. Odysseus On Calypso's Island
3. Odysseus In The Underworld
4. Odysseus And The Sirens
5. The Tempest At Sea
6. Penelope's Lament
7. Nausicaa
8. The Banquet With The Phaiakes
9. Penelope Weaving A Garment
10. The Return
11. Feast In Ithaca
12. Final Chorus

Bruch was careful to ensure that his work remained a dramatic piece of choral music and did not venture into the realm of the operatic. For this reason Penelope's suitors are not portrayed, and the scene where Odysseus kills them is omitted. A traditional religious oratorio had contrasting episodes of recitative and arias but Bruch created a single flowing narrative that did not adhere to this clear distinction. One reason for its eventual decline into obscurity may be that for such a heroic and moving subject, the work seems undramatic, sometimes laboured in its setting of the text, and disjointed in its episodes; there is no narrator to link the 12 self-contained sections.

== Early critical reception ==
After Bruch directed its première in Barmen on 8 February 1873, the work was staged with great success and inspired the creation of many other secular oratorios. Bruch, much encouraged by this success, wrote others himself - Achilleus, Gustav Adolf and Das Lied vor der Glocke, but none repeated the outstanding success of Odysseus.

During Bruch's lifetime Odysseus was one of his most popular and frequently performed works. Brahms admired it greatly and chose to conduct it himself in 1875 in the last concert he conducted at the Vienna Philharmonic. A performance in Liverpool in 1877 was to lead to Bruch's appointment as principal conductor of the Liverpool Philharmonic Society in 1880. By the end of 1875 it had received at least forty-two performances, and in 1893, when Bruch was made an honorary doctor by Cambridge University, the concert celebrating him opened with an excerpt from it.

A less favourable review came in 1883. “The work has been received with such a chorus of disapproval that we are not likely to hear it again… in Odysseus Herr Bruch undertook a task beyond his means, and selected a theme to which he failed in bringing sufficient fancy, graphic power, variety and melodic charm. It is very laboured, and, technically, very clever; it bespeaks extreme earnestness and industry, [and] it soon wearies by reason of the obvious effort there is in it.”

== Later unpopularity ==
The popularity of Odysseus declined rapidly after the First World War. In Britain audiences were no longer keen to listen to music by German composers. Internationally, the rise of modernism in music made Bruch's romantic style seem outdated and in Germany itself, tastes in the Weimar Republic no longer included works associated with the imperialist ambitions of the kaisers.

Social changes also worked against Bruch's legacy. Odysseus was written for amateur choral societies, which had been enormously popular in the late nineteenth century. Choral singing was a very common hobby for educated people in Germany and other countries, but declined rapidly in the early twentieth century, and the music it depended on came to be seen as sentimental.
