= Swedish Dances (Bruch) =

1892 set of 15 dances by Max Bruh

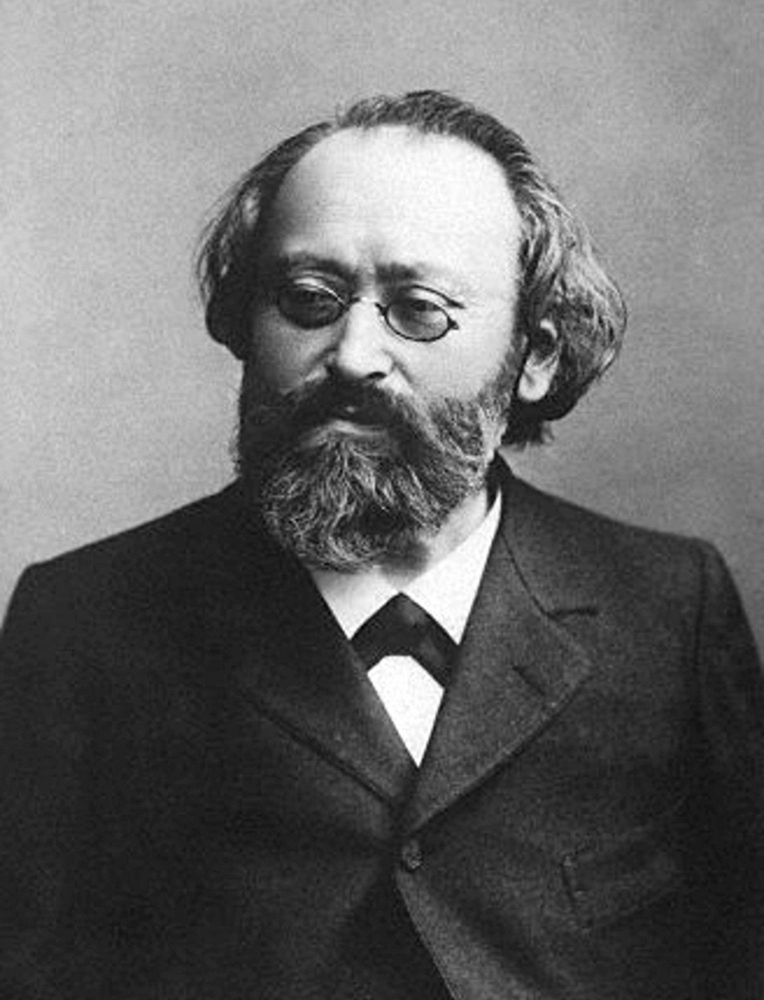
Max Bruch

The Swedish Dances (German: Schwedische Tänze), Op. 63 by Max Bruch is a set of fifteen dances.They were published in two books by N. Simrock in 1892 in Berlin. There are versions for violin and piano (first version), piano four-hands, military band, and full orchestra.

Book 1

- Dance I: Einleitung (langsam, 2/4).-sehr mäßig (3/4) in D minor
- Dance II: Ruhig bewegt. (3/4) in D major
- Dance III: Frisch, nicht zu schnell. (3/4) in D minor
- Dance IV: Langsam, nicht schleppend.-Ein wenig belebter.- Langsam, nicht schleppend. (3/4) in B♭ major
- Dance V: Ziemlich schnell. (3/4) in G minor
- Dance VI: Langsam, mit Ausdruck. (3/4) in E♭ major
- Dance VII: Lebhaft. (3/8) in B♭ major

Book 2:

- Dance VIII: Sehr mässig. (3/4) in F minor
- Dance IX: Lebhaft. (3/4) in F major
- Dance X: Frisch, nicht zu schnell. (3/4) in D major
- Dance XI: Sehr mässig. (3/4) in B minor
- Dance XII: Langsam, nicht schleppend. (3/4) in G major
- Dance XIII: Sehr mässig. (2/4) in A minor
- Dance XIV: Gehend, ruhig bewegt. (2/4) in A minor
- Dance XV: Sehr mässig. (3/4) in D minor
