= Heinrich Bulthaupt =

German poet, author and lawyer (1849 - 1905)

Heinrich Bulthaupt (October 26, 1849 – August 20, 1905) was a German poet, dramatic author, and lawyer, as well as librarian of his native town, Bremen. Many of Bulthaupt's works found considerable widespread popularity in the lyrical and dramatic genres.

== Early life ==
Bulthaupt was the son of a principal in Neustadt. He studied law at the University of Würzburg, the University of Göttingen, the Humboldt University of Berlin and the University of Leipzig; after receiving his doctorate in 1872, he went to work as a private tutor in Kiev. From there, he traveled to Greece, the Middle East, Tunis, and Italy. At the age of 26, Bulthaupt returned to Bremen and worked as a lawyer for four years.

== Works ==
=== Artistic activities ===
Heinrich Bulthaupt's first play was an iambic tragedy, "Saul" that he had already begun to write as a high school student, premiering in 1870 in his hometown of Bremen. It was followed by "Ein corsisches tragedy" in the style of a Bourgeois tragedy . Among his later tragedies, "Workers" (1877) stands out particularly, an attempt to deal with social issues of that time period. Bulthaupt also ventured to adaptations of dramas of world literature. He completed Schiller's fragment "Malteser" (1883) and edited Shakespeare's Cymbeline (titled Imogen, 1885) and Timon of Athens (Timon of Athens, 1892). However, his greatest successes as a dramatist were with two little comedies, both one-act plays that were often played late in the 19th century on German stages. First, this was "The Copyist" (1875), the story of a young girl who copied the works of great painters in an art gallery. Bulthaupt also wrote the comedy "Lebende Bilder" (Living pictures, 1880), whose plot has a more complex structure. Much like "The Copyist", it connects visual art to love. Bulthaupt's interest in musical theater is documented in several libretti.

=== Scientific activity ===
Heinrich Bulthaupt acquired great recognition with his theatrical writings, but he also wrote pieces in which he discussed material of other writers. His main work is the Hamburg Dramaturgy. In it, he proves to be a staunch opponent of the emerging naturalism. In the first volume, he analyzes the dramas of Lessing, Goethe, Schiller and Kleist; the second volume he dedicated exclusively to Shakespeare and then discussed in the third volume of the theater works of Grillparzer, Hebbel, Otto Ludwig, Karl Gutzkow and Heinrich Laube, outlining the development of the German drama to the present. The fourth volume is dedicated to the plays of Henrik Ibsen, Ernst von Wildenbruch, Hermann Sudermann and Gerhart Hauptmann. Heinrich Bulthaupt was the first non-musician to author a dramaturgy of opera.

=== Dramas ===
His dramatic productions include Saul (1870); Ein corsisches Trauerspiel (1871); Die Arbeiter (1876), in which work a distinctively modern subject is treated with admirable skill; Gerold Wendel (1884, second edition, 1890); Die Kopisten, comedy (1875); Ahausver (1904).

=== Librettos ===
Bulthaupt furnished the text the secular oratorios Achilleus and Leonidas by Max Bruch as well as an oratorio by Georg Vierling

- 1875-1882 libretto to Das Käthchen von Heilbronn (1885) a romantic opera in 4 acts by Carl Martin Reinthaler

=== Literary criticism ===
He prepared adaptations of Shakespearean dramas (Cymbeline, 1885, and Timon von Athen, 1894); and wrote a number of poetic works (Durch Frost und Gluten, (1892; new edition, 1904), and criticisms, notably Shakespeare und der Naturalismus, as well as some novelettes. The work by which he achieved especial distinction, however, is the Dramaturgie der Klassiker (1882 et seq., and frequently reprinted as Dramaturgie der Oper (two volumes, 1887). Consult H. Kraeger, Litterarische Vorträge aus dem Nachlass ausgewählt und durchgeschen (Oldenburg, `1912).

== Honors ==
- The Bulthauptstrasse in Bremen was named after Bulthaupt in 1905.
