= Das Veilchen =

1774 poem by Goethe, set to music by Mozart and others

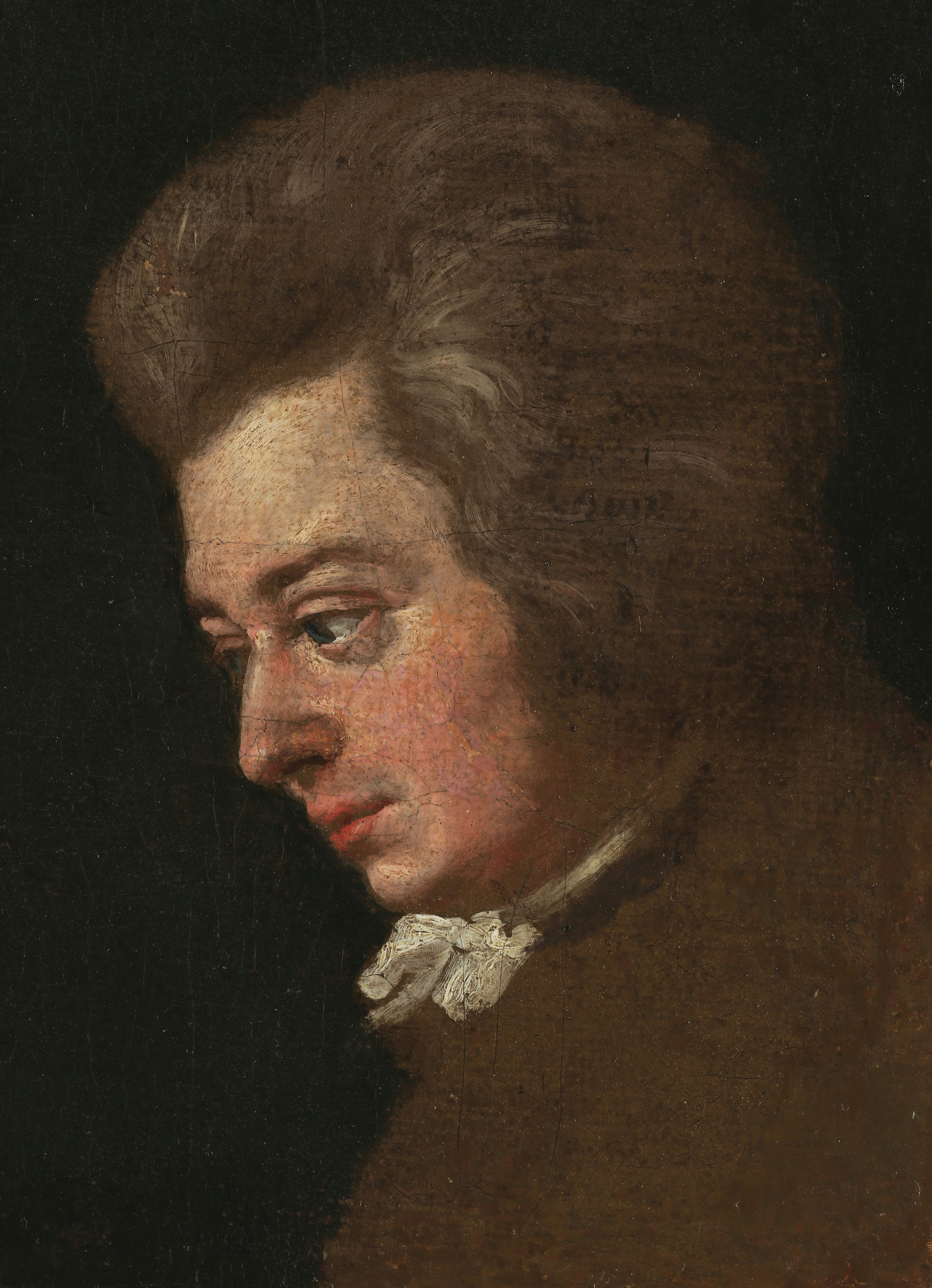
Detail of Joseph Lange's 1782–83 Mozart portrait

"Das Veilchen" ("The Violet"), K. 476, is a song for voice and piano by Wolfgang Amadeus Mozart, written in Vienna on 8 June 1785, to a poem by Johann Wolfgang von Goethe.

== Lyrics ==
Goethe wrote the poem in 1773 or early 1774. It was first published in March 1775 in his first Singspiel Erwin und Elmire which was first set to music in 1775 by the German composer Johann André (a revival in 1776 used music by Anna Amalia of Brunswick-Wolfenbüttel and by Carl David Stegmann, and another 1785 had music by Ernst Wilhelm Wolf and Karl Christian Agthe).

In 1771, Goethe had written the poem "Heidenröslein" which tells of a young man's plucking of a feisty rose. In "Das Veilchen" it is a careless girl who destroys a violet, a metaphor for a young man's heart.

"Das Veilchen"
Performed in 1952 by Janny van Wering (piano), Elisabeth Margano (soprano)

Ein Veilchen auf der Wiese stand,
gebückt in sich und unbekannt;
es war ein herzigs Veilchen.
Da kam ein' junge Schäferin
mit leichtem Schritt und munterm Sinn
daher, daher,
die Wiese her und sang.

Ach! denkt das Veilchen, wär' ich nur
die schönste Blume der Natur,
ach, nur ein kleines Weilchen,
bis mich das Liebchen abgepflückt
und an dem Busen matt gedrückt,
ach, nur, ach nur
ein Viertelstündchen lang!

Ach, aber ach! Das Mädchen kam
und nicht in acht das Veilchen nahm,
ertrat das arme Veilchen.
Es sank und starb, und freut' sich noch:
und sterb' ich denn, so sterb' ich doch
durch sie, durch sie,
zu ihren Füßen doch!

A violet in the meadow stood,
with humble brow, demure and good,
it was the sweetest violet.
There came along a shepherdess
with youthful step and happiness,
who sang, who sang
along the way this song.

Oh! thought the violet, how I pine
for nature's beauty to be mine,
if only for a moment.
for then my love might notice me
and on her bosom fasten me,
I wish, I wish
if but a moment long.

But, cruel fate! The maiden came,
without a glance or care for him,
she trampled down the violet.
He sank and died, but happily:
and so I die then let me die
for her, for her,
beneath her darling feet.

Mozart added the following line to the end of his setting:
Das arme Veilchen! es war ein herzigs Veilchen.
Poor little violet! It was the sweetest violet.

== Music ==
This song is Mozart's only setting to a text by Goethe. It is not clear where exactly Mozart encountered the poem, but is likely through one of its settings by other composers of the time. Mozart made a telling addition by adding his last line.

The poem is written in three stanzas, but instead of using strophic form, Mozart creates a through-composed work, demonstrating his careful attention to the words of the poet by creating a different mood for each verse. At the end of the song, the composer recalls the opening line in a touching 5-bar coda.

The piece is 65 bars long and a performance lasts about 2 1/2 minutes. Its key signature is G major; its meter is 2/4. The vocal range covers only the interval of a ninth, from F^{4} to G^{5}.

The piece starts with a 6-bar introduction of the melody of the first line by the piano. The first stanza takes up the next 15 bars. The entry of the shepherdess is marked by a modulation to D major; this is followed by a four-bar segment which summarises the violet's happy mood – and a general pause which precedes the mood swing of the second verse, a change of key to G minor to describe the violet's longing. There is a modulation to the relative major B♭ major in the latter part of that verse when the violet expresses hope of being loved back, but ending in a falling phrygian lament. The narration of the third verse is a recitativo accompagnato in E♭ major culminating in the trampling of the violet which is emphasised by a following general pause. The dying flower is described by a chromatically falling line, before the final modulation back to G major changes the pain into jubilation: to die at the beloved's feet. Then Mozart adds two phrases of his own as a coda; in recitative, in free time and using only two notes: "Das arme Veilchen!" (Poor little violet!), a long general pause, and closing the song a tempo with a quotation from the third line: "es war ein herzigs Veilchen." (it was the sweetest violet.)

== By other composers ==
Other composers who have set this poem to music (besides those mentioned above as composers of Goethe's singspiel) include Philipp Christoph Kayser (1776), Anton Schweitzer (1777), Joseph Anton Steffan (1779), Johann Friedrich Reichardt in 1780 and in 1783, (the second setting was praised by Clara Kathleen Rogers and Felix Mendelssohn) Karl Siegmund von Seckendorff (1779), Friedrich Heinrich Himmel (c. 1807), Peter Josef von Lindpaintner (1815), Václav Tomášek (1815), Carl Gottlieb Reissiger (1827), Clara Schumann (1853), Nikolai Medtner (1909), and Othmar Schoeck (1915). Musical settings in other languages include the composers Halfdan Kjerulf to a Danish translation by Adam Oehlenschläger, Johan Erik Nordblom to a Swedish text, and an English version by Clara Kathleen Rogers.
