= Erwin und Elmire =

1776 opera by Brunswick-Wolfenbüttel

- Opera by Duchess Anna Amalia of Brunswick-Wolfenbüttel
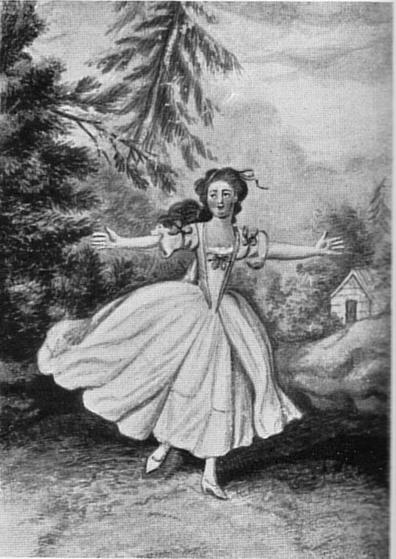
- Demoiselle Huber as Elmire, drawing by Chodowiecki
- Librettist: Johann Wolfgang von Goethe
- Language: German
- Based on: Oliver Goldsmith's balladThe Hermit
- Premiere: 24 May 1776; Hoftheater in Weimar

Erwin und Elmire is an opera in two acts by Duchess Anna Amalia of Brunswick-Wolfenbüttel, with a libretto by Johann Wolfgang von Goethe, after Oliver Goldsmith's ballad of Angelica and Edwin, The Hermit, in his sentimental novel The Vicar of Wakefield.

Goethe moved to Weimar, in circumstances decisive for his future career, in November 1775. There he was introduced to Anna Amalia (1739–1807), the Dowager Duchess of Saxe-Weimar-Eisenach, a formidable political figure who was also a fine composer. Goethe's arrival in Weimar coincided with her partial withdrawal from political life as her son had reached the age of maturity, and Anna seized the opportunity to provide her own setting of Erwin and Elmire for the Court Theatre, where it was first performed on 24 May 1776.

== Goethe's libretto ==
The ballad of Angelica and Edwin was first published privately in 1764, and two years later was incorporated into Chapter 8 of The Vicar of Wakefield. Its success was immediate and widespread. Goethe was not the only literary figure who was to adapt the tale; it appears, for instance, in de Laborde's Lettres sur la Suisse (1783). Victor Pelissier's opera Edwin and Angelina, or The Banditti which premiered in New York in 1796, was based upon an adaptation by Elihu Hubbard Smith.

Goethe made his adaptation of Erwin und Elmire, as the ballad became known in Germany, in 1773, attracted, no doubt, to the parallels between the tale and his faltering relationship with Lili Schönemann, to whom the text is dedicated. It was published in 1775 as a Schauspiel mit Gesang, the first time this designation appeared in Germany.

The great success of Goethe's reworking of this sentimental tale no doubt derives in large measure from the fact that it touched upon many social and cultural preoccupations of the day. Its theme of reconciliation, achieved in rustic surroundings, was a pointed critique on the social pretensions of emerging middle-class society. The literary-poetic figures of the 'hermit' and the 'hut' were in fact to become recurring themes in Goethe's writings, also helping to frame his lifelong exploration of the difficulty of reconciling steadfast virtues with restless desires.

== Anna Amalia's score ==
The score is testament to the high level of musical attainment of the composer. Anna Amalia draws upon models from both opera seria, opera buffa, and folk song to create a successful dramatic whole, one in which all four protagonists are characterised as much by the nuances provided by the musical accompaniment as by the content and register of the words they speak. The predominantly buffa style, for instance, is ideal for a character like Bernardo who shares its potent mix of humour and humanity. On the other hand the lovers' passion is aptly reflected in the application of the concerted style common to opera seria. Elmire's remorse gives rise to a strophic song ("Ein Veilchen") that, through its unassuming lyricism, leaves us in no doubt as to her sincerity. And Erwin's opening aria ("Ihr verblühet, süsse Rosen") amounts to a musical ennoblement—which, given he is in fact of lowly birth, suggests that neither Amalia nor Goethe sought to restrict a noble temperament merely to those of noble birth.

The dramatic effectiveness of these stylistic adaptations marks Anna Amalia's Erwin und Elmire as a major early achievement in the development of German opera.

== Recent performance history ==
Anna Amalia's setting had no modern revival until a staged performance by students of the University of Cambridge, UK, in 1999. A further performance was given 29 February 2008 in Central Hall, Melbourne, Australia by IOpera. This was the first performance based on the fully restored score by Furore Verlag. It received its first fully complete realisation at the Ekhof Festival in Gotha in the summer of 2009.

== Roles ==
Role	Voice type	Premiere cast, 24 May 1776 (Conductor: –)
Olympia, mother of Elmire	soprano	
Elmire, in love with Erwin	soprano	
Bernardo, mentor to Elmire	tenor or soprano	
Erwin, in love with Elmire	tenor or soprano	

== Synopsis ==
Olympia, mother of Elmire, laments the restrictive social graces of the young and reminisces on the carefree days of her own youth. Elmire, her daughter, appears and seems inconsolable, she tries in vain to cheer her up. After Olympia departs, we discover that Elmire is distressed because she believes her cold behaviour towards Erwin, her lowly born suitor, has caused him to disappear. Bernardo, Elmire's French instructor and mentor, overhears her self-reproaches and is able to persuade her to meet an old hermit in a secluded valley. There, he promises, she will find joy in her heart once more.

The second act opens with Erwin in his hideaway hut in the country. Bernardo arrives and announces that Elmire will shortly visit him unaware of his true identity. He disguises Erwin as a hermit. When Elmire arrives, she proceeds to make confession, admitting to having driven her lover to despair by feigning indifference in deference to social propriety. Erwin, convinced at last that Elmire really loves him, reveals his true identity to the delight of all concerned.

== Orchestration ==
Scored for: 2 flutes, 2 oboes, 2 horns, 1 bassoon, strings

== Musical numbers ==
No.	Title	Cast
1	Overture	
1a	Geängstet	Elmire
2	Liebes Kind, was hast du wieder?	Olympia
3	Was sind all die Seligkeiten	Elmire
4	Ihr solltet genießen	Olympia
5	Erwin, o schau!	Elmire
6	Hin ist hin	Bernardo
7	Ein Veilchen auf der Wiese stand	Elmire
8	Ich muß ihn sehen	Elmire, Bernardo (duet)
9	Ein Schauspiel für Götter	Bernardo
10	Entr'acte with violin solo	
11	Ihr verblühet, süße Rosen	Erwin
12	Inneres Wühlen	Erwin
13	Sie scheinen zu spielen	Bernardo
14	Sein ganzes Herz dahinzugeben	Erwin, Bernardo (duet)
15	Mit vollen Atemzügen	Elmire
16	Sieh mich, Heilger, wie ich bin	Elmire
17	Ha, sie liebt mich!	Erwin, Bernardo (duet)
18	Er ist nicht weit	Erwin, Elmire, Bernardo (trio)
19	Vergib mir die Eile	Erwin and Elmire (duet)
20	Finale: Vom Himmel gegeben	Erwin, Elmire, Bernardo, Olympia (quartet)

== Manuscript and score ==
A facsimile of the manuscript score is held by the Anna Amalia Library in Weimar (Mus II a : 98)—thankfully the original survived the catastrophic fire in 2004, though the original orchestral parts did not. Max Friedlaender (1852–1934) produced a heavily edited vocal score of Anna Amalia's Erwin and Elmire in 1921. A performing edition of the work was published by Furore Verlag in Germany in 2008.

== Other settings of Goethe's text ==
An earlier setting of the text, also entitled Erwin und Elmire, was made by Johann André and first performed in May 1775 in Frankfurt. After Anna Amalia's, several more settings were to follow, including ones by Carl David Stegmann (Hamburg, 1776), Ernst Wilhelm Wolf (Weimar, 1785) and Karl Christian Agthe (Ballenstedt, 1785). The most recent was by the Swiss composer Othmar Schoeck (1886–1957) which premiered in 1915.

Goethe revised the libretto in 1787/88 while touring in Italy, introducing a secondary pair of lovers into the tale, and adapting the spoken dialogue into recitative. This version was set by Johann Friedrich Reichardt and received its premiere in Berlin in early 1793.

The Romanze "Ein Veilchen" from Erwin und Elmire was the only setting of Goethe's text made by Mozart, his song K. 476 (1785). The story eventually became the subject of satire: in Gilbert and Sullivan's operetta Trial by Jury (1875), the two lovers (here Edwin and Angelina) become the principal parties to a divorce case.
