= Agthe =

Agthe is a surname. Notable people with the surname include:

- Adam Georg von Agthe (1777–1826), Russian general
- Adolf Agthe (1863–1941), Norwegian architect
- Albrecht Agthe (1790–1873), music educator
- Karl Christian Agthe (1762–1797), German organist and composer
- Klaus Agthe (born 1930), German-American businessman and author
