= Erwin und Elmire (André) =

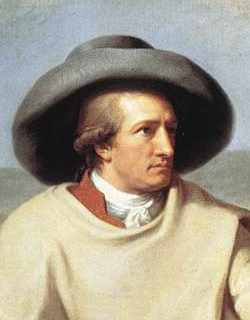
Detail of a portrait of Johann Wolfgang von Goethe by Johann Heinrich Wilhelm Tischbein, oil on canvas.

Erwin und Elmire is a singspiel, described as a Schauspiel mit Gesang, in two acts by the German composer Johann André, with a libretto by Johann Wolfgang von Goethe, after Oliver Goldsmith's ballad of Angelica and Edwin, The Hermit, in chapter 8 of his sentimental novel The Vicar of Wakefield.

André was the first to set Goethe's text in 1775, but he was closely followed by Anna Amalia of Brunswick-Wolfenbüttel whose own Erwin und Elmire was performed in 1776. Versions followed by Carl David Stegmann (Hamburg, 1776), Ernst Wilhelm Wolf (Weimar, 1785) and Karl Christian Agthe (Ballenstedt, 1785), also Johann Friedrich Reichardt (concert performance, Berlin, 1793) who based his work on a later revised text by Goethe. Othmar Schoeck's songs and incidental music to the play premiered in 1916.

== Performance history ==
The opera was first performed privately in Frankfurt in May 1775. A public production by the Döbbelin Company appeared in Berlin at the Theater in der Behrenstraße on 17 July 1775.

== Roles ==
Role	Voice type	Premiere cast, 17 July 1775 (Conductor: )
Elmire, in love with Erwin	soprano	
Erwin, in love with Elmire	tenor	
Bernardo, tutor to Elmire	tenor	
Olympia, mother of Elmire	soprano	

== Synopsis ==
Elmire is distressed because she believes her cold behaviour towards Erwin has caused him to run away. Bernardo, Elmire’s tutor, persuades her to meet an old hermit in a secluded valley. The hermit is really Erwin in disguise.
