= Adolph Kullak =

German pianist and musicologist

Adolph Kullak (23 February 1823 – 25 December 1862) was a German pianist and music writer.

== Life ==
Born in Międzyrzecz, Kullak, the brother of the founder of the New Academy of Music, Theodor Kullak, is still significant today through his writings on music theory. Adolf studied with Albrecht Agthe and Adolf Bernhard Marx in Berlin.

His main works are Das Musikalisch-Schöne, ein Beitrag zur Ästhetik der Tonkunst and Die Ästhetik des Klavierspiels. (1860). He also worked as a piano teacher and as an author for the Neue Berliner Musikzeitung.

Kullack died in Berlin at the age of 39.

== Works ==
Kullak, Adolph: The Aestetics of Pianoforte Playing, trans.1893, reprint N.Y. 1972, ISBN 9781498038614

== Secondary literature ==
Gerig, Reginald: Famous Pianists and Their Technique (Washington 1976) ISBN 0-88331-066-X

Ydefeldt, Stefan: Die einfache runde Bewegung am Klavier: Bewegungsphilosophien um 1900 und ihre Auswirkungen auf die heutige Klaviermethodik, (Augsburg 2018): Wissner Verlag orig. Schwedisch, ISBN 978-3-95786-136-8
