= Międzyrzecz Castle =

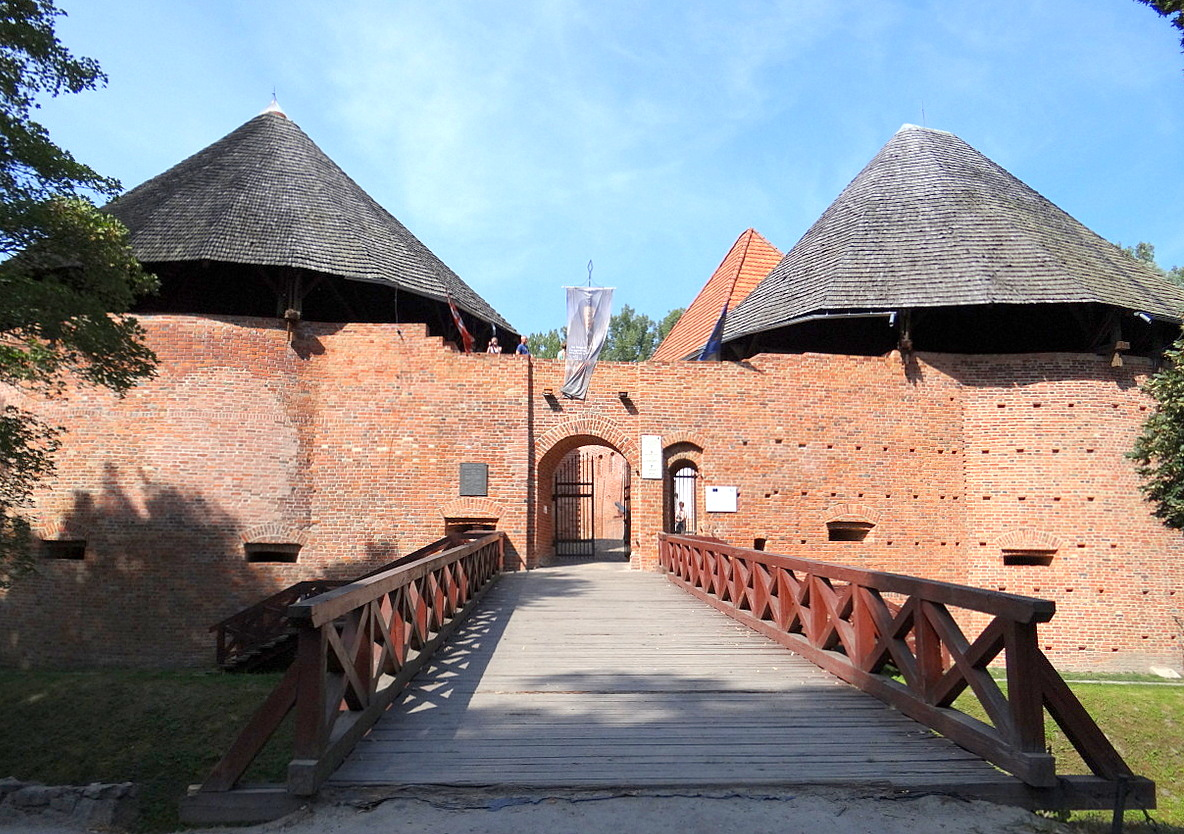
- Międzyrzecz Castle

- Location of the Międzyrzecz Castle in Poland
- 52°26′42″N 15°34′20″E
- Location: Międzyrzecz, Lubusz Voivodeship, in Poland

History
- Built: 1233
- Rebuilt: 1855-1875

Site notes
- Architectural style: Gothic

Historic Monument of Poland
- Designated: 2024-11-13
- Reference no.: Dz. U. z 2024 r. poz. 1677

Międzyrzecz Castle, also known as the Royal Piast Castle of Międzyrzecz, is a medieval stronghold surrounded by a dike, built in around 1350 by King Casimir III the Great in the place of a former gord from the second half of the ninth century, located on a small hill in between two floodplains of the Obra and Paklica Rivers.

== History ==
The castle in Międzyrzecz was built on the location of a former wooden gord from the ninth century, located on a small hill in between two floodplains of the Obra and Paklica Rivers. It is most likely that in the thirteenth century a stone built tower was raised, and the full stronghold was complete in the mid-fourteenth century during the reign of Casimir III the Great. Due to the location of the stronghold, the castle was expanded and modernised, although that caste itself did not go through any major battles in the medieval times. In 1474, King Matthias Corvinus of Hungary took over the castle. In 1520, the castle was heavily damaged by the Teutonic Order during the war with Poland, after which the castle was modernised and in 1574 two bastions were built around the castle. In 1655, the castle was destroyed by the Swedes during the Deluge. In the first half of the eighteenth century the castle was so damaged that even after reconstruction the castle was not able to be used. After the Second Partition of Poland the Prussian forces gave the castle to a Prussian family. The interior of the castle was used as a warehouse and the top floors for a winery.

Since 1945 the castle is used to house a museum. In the years of 1954 to 1958 a number of archaeological excavations were carried out. In the 1950s and 1960s the castle was renovated and stopped the castle from becoming a ruin. The gatehouse and nearby living quarters were reconstructed.
