= Erdmann Sturm =

German theologian (born 1937)

Erdmann Karl Sturm (born 2 July 1937 in Meseritz) is a German Protestant theologian and professor emeritus (A.D.) at LMU Munich, where he was Dean of the Faculty of Protestant Theology from 1993 to 1995.

He graduated from high school in Lippstadt in 1957. From 1957 onwards he studied Latin philology, history and philosophy for two years and at the same time Protestant theology in Bonn, Heidelberg and Münster until 1965. He took his first theological exam in 1965. This was followed by the vicariate, the second theological examination and an auxiliary service in the Protestant parish of Havixbeck. From 1990 to 1992, Sturm was First Chairman of the German Paul Tillich Society (DPTG). For many years he was a member of the Scientific Advisory Board of the German Comenius Society (DCG) beginning in 1993.

Since his retirement in 2002, he has edited major portions of the unpublished papers of Paul Tillich.
