= Międzyrzecz =

Town in Lubusz Voivodeship, Poland

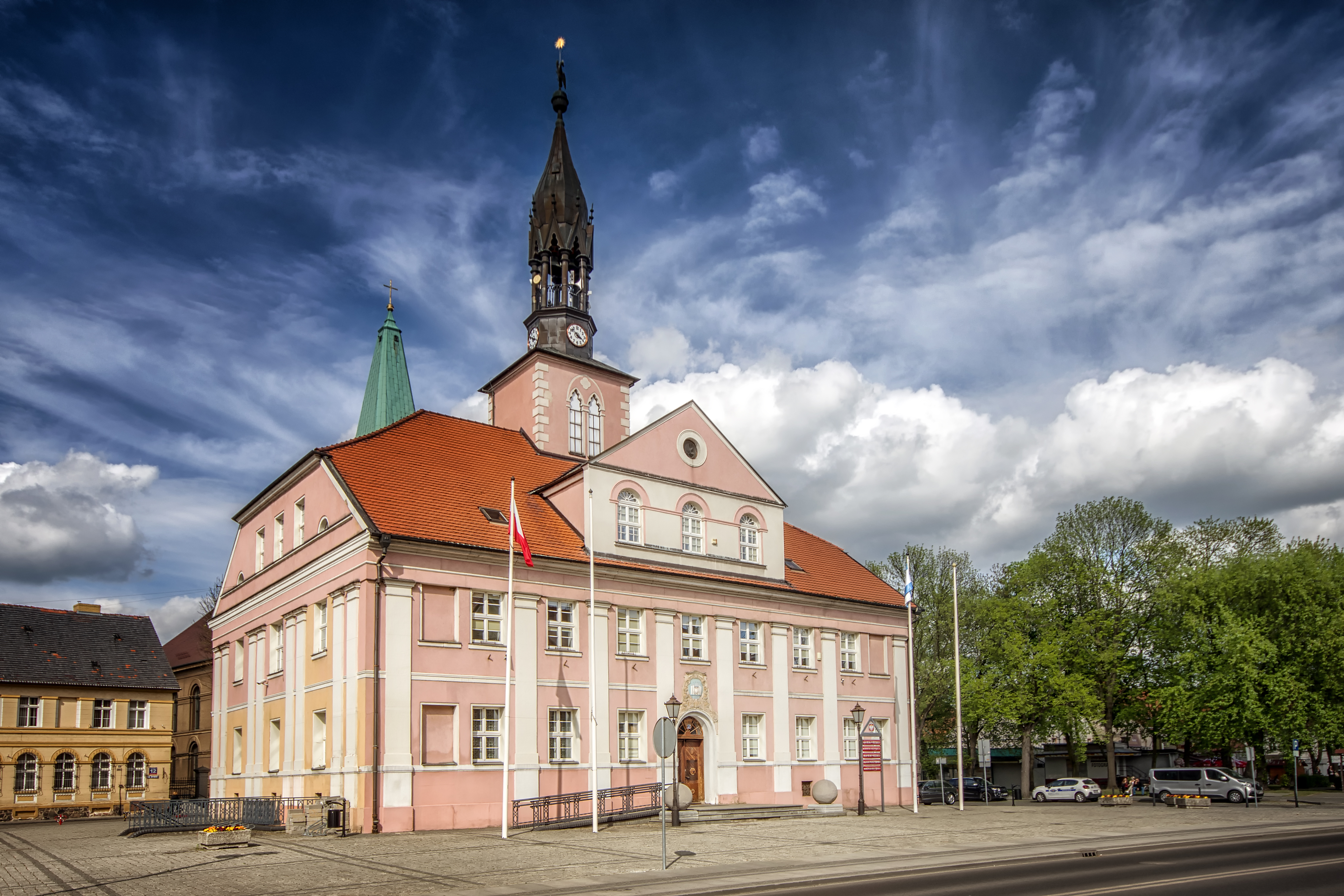
- Town hall

- Flag Coat of arms

- Location within Poland
- Coordinates: 52°26′54″N 15°35′18″E
- Country: Poland
- Voivodeship: Lubusz
- County: Międzyrzecz
- Gmina: Międzyrzecz
- Founded: 9th century
- First mentioned: 1005
- Town rights: between 1230 and 1248

Government
  - Mayor: Remigiusz Lorenz (since 2014)

Area
  - Total: 10.26 km^{2} (3.96 sq mi)
- Elevation: 52.5 m (172 ft)

Population (2020-12-31)
  - Total: 17,667
  - Density: 1,722/km^{2} (4,460/sq mi)
- Time zone: UTC+1 (CET)
  - Summer (DST): UTC+2 (CEST)
- Postal code: 66–300
- Area code: +48 95
- Car plates: FMI
- Website: miedzyrzecz.pl

Międzyrzecz (Polish pronunciation: [mʲɛnˈd͡zɨʐɛt͡ʂ], Latin: Meserici, German: Meseritz, Yiddish: מעזריטש, romanized: Mezrits) is a town in western Poland, on the Obra and Paklica river, with 17,667 inhabitants (2020). The capital of Gmina Międzyrzecz and Międzyrzecz County in Lubusz Voivodeship.

Founded in the 9th century, Międzyrzecz is a former royal city of Poland. It contains heritage in various styles, including Gothic, Baroque and Neoclassical, including a medieval Royal Castle, listed as a Historic Monument of Poland. During World War II, it was the site of German Nazi atrocities in which more than 10,000 people were killed.

== Geography ==
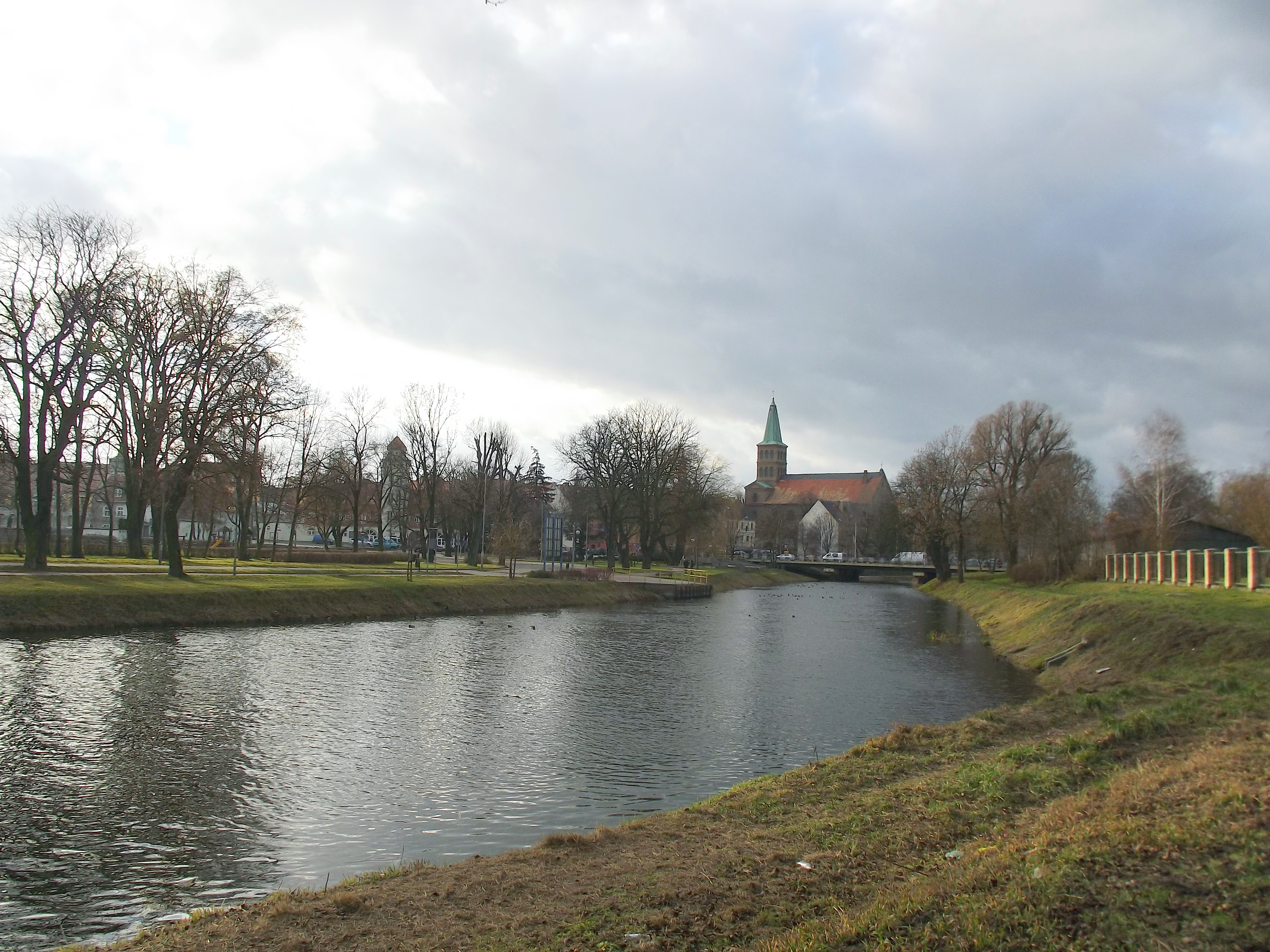
Obra River

The town's name refers to its location "between rivers" (Polish: Międzyrzecze) at the confluence of the Obra River and the Paklica tributary, in the west of the historic Greater Poland region. About halfway between the towns of Skwierzyna and Świebodzin, it is situated 48 kilometres (30 mi) south of the regional capital Gorzów Wielkopolski and 68 km (42 mi) north of Zielona Góra.

The municipal area is in a particularly green part of Poland. Extensive forests and numerous lakes can be found in the vicinity, including two Natura 2000 protected areas south of the town.

Międzyrzecz is the seventh largest town in Lubusz Voivodeship. The number of inhabitants has slightly been on the decrease since the 1990s.

== History ==
=== Early history ===
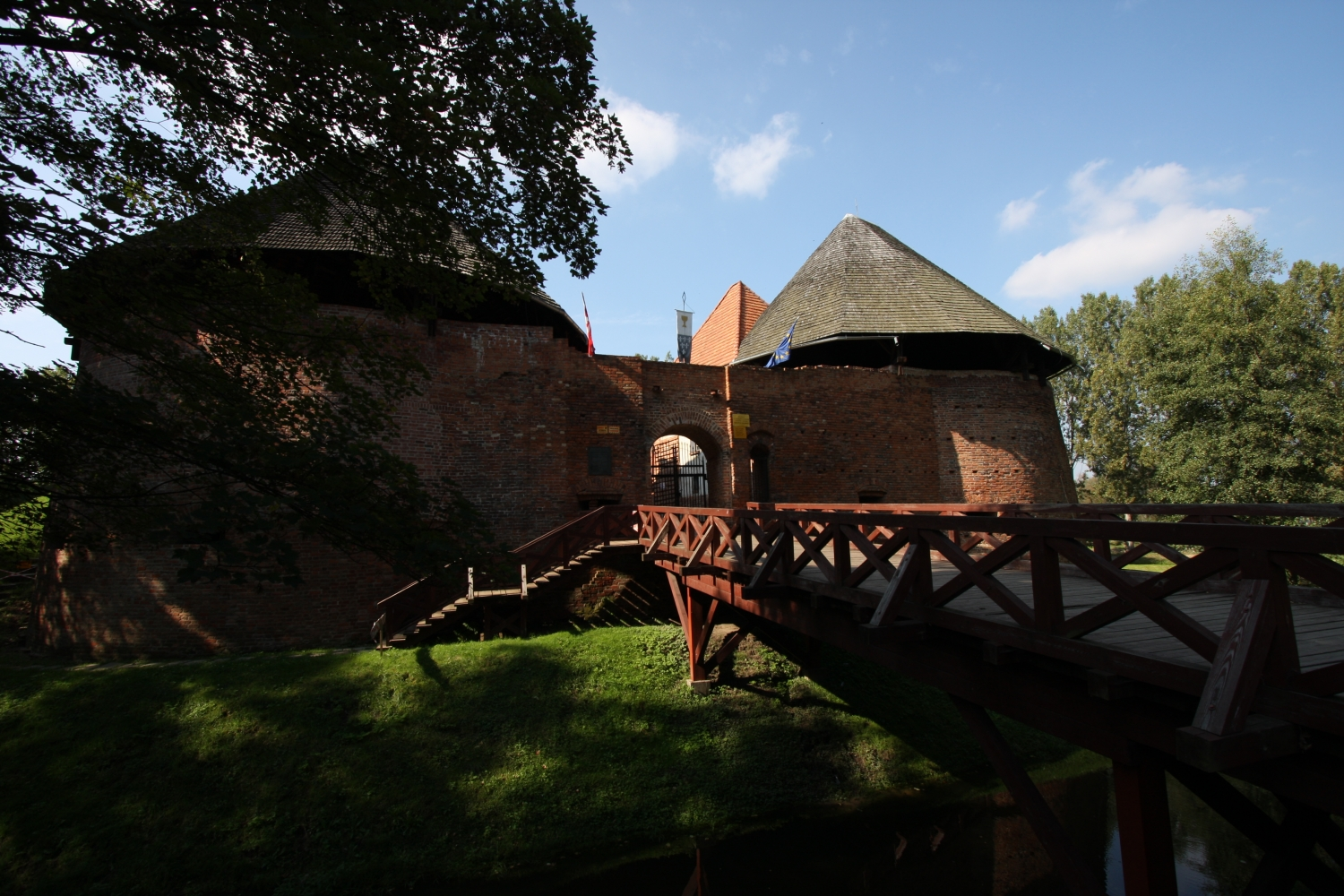
Międzyrzecz Royal Castle

The settlement on the road leading from Magdeburg to Gniezno was first mentioned as Mezerici by the medieval chronicler Thietmar of Merseburg in the course of the 1005 campaign of King Henry II of Germany into the Polish lands of Duke Bolesław I Chrobry. There was a Polish defensive stronghold in Międzyrzecz, one of the strongholds that reinforced the defense of the western border in the event of a possible German invasion from the west, located east of the defensive strongholds in the Lubusz Land. In the 1112/16 Gesta principum Polonorum by Gallus Anonymus it appeared under the Old Polish name Mezyriecze.

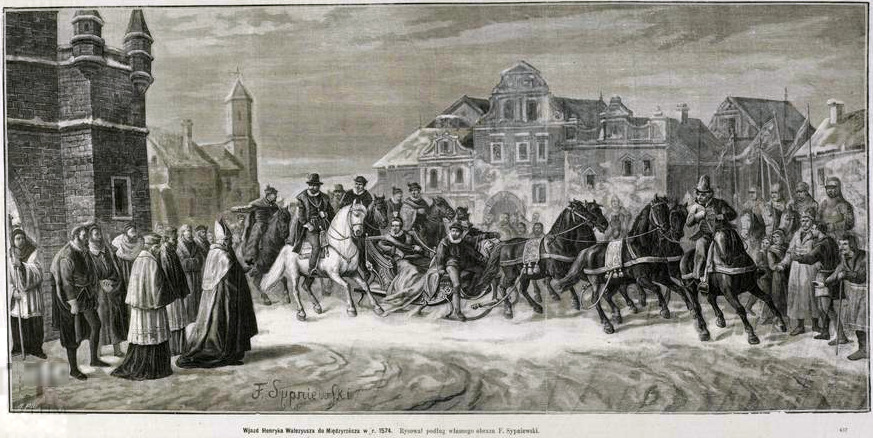
Arrival of King Henry of Valois in Międzyrzecz in 1574, by Feliks Sypniewski

It remained a western outpost of the Duchy of Greater Poland, established by the 1138 Testament of Bolesław III Krzywousty, after the loss of Lubusz Land in the mid-13th century and was incorporated into the Poznań Voivodeship of the Polish Crown upon the coronation of King Władysław I the Elbow-high in 1320. Under the rule of his successor Casimir III the Great (1333–1370) German settlers began to migrate into the area in the course of the Ostsiedlung. Town privileges were confirmed by King Casimir IV Jagiellon in 1485. Międzyrzecz was a royal town of the Polish Crown and the seat of starosts (local royal administrators), administratively located in the Poznań Voivodeship in the Greater Poland Province. In 1520 it was ravaged by the Germans.

=== Late modern period ===
In the Second Partition of Poland of 1793 it was annexed by the Kingdom of Prussia. The town at first was part of the South Prussia province. After the successful Greater Poland uprising of 1806, it was regained by Poles and included within the short-lived Polish Duchy of Warsaw, within which it was administratively located in the Poznań Department. Upon the 1815 Congress of Vienna fell back to Prussia, administrated within the Grand Duchy of Posen. In 1818 the town became the capital of the Prussian Kreis Meseritz within Regierungsbezirk Posen. After the failed Greater Poland Uprising of 1848, it was incorporated into the Province of Posen, which, with Prussia, became part of the unified German Empire in 1871.

After World War I, upon the Greater Poland Uprising of 1918/19 and according to the Treaty of Versailles, the town was part of the small, mostwestern part of Greater Poland which remained part of Weimar Germany. From 1922 these lands, located close to the border with the Second Polish Republic, were administrated as the Prussian Province of Posen-West Prussia. Meseritz became the seat of the Landeshauptmann governor, until in 1938 the province was dissolved and Meseritz was incorporated into the Province of Brandenburg. From 1934 to 1938, the Nazi administration had the Festungsfront Oder-Warthe-Bogen fortifications erected in the south of the town.

=== World War II ===
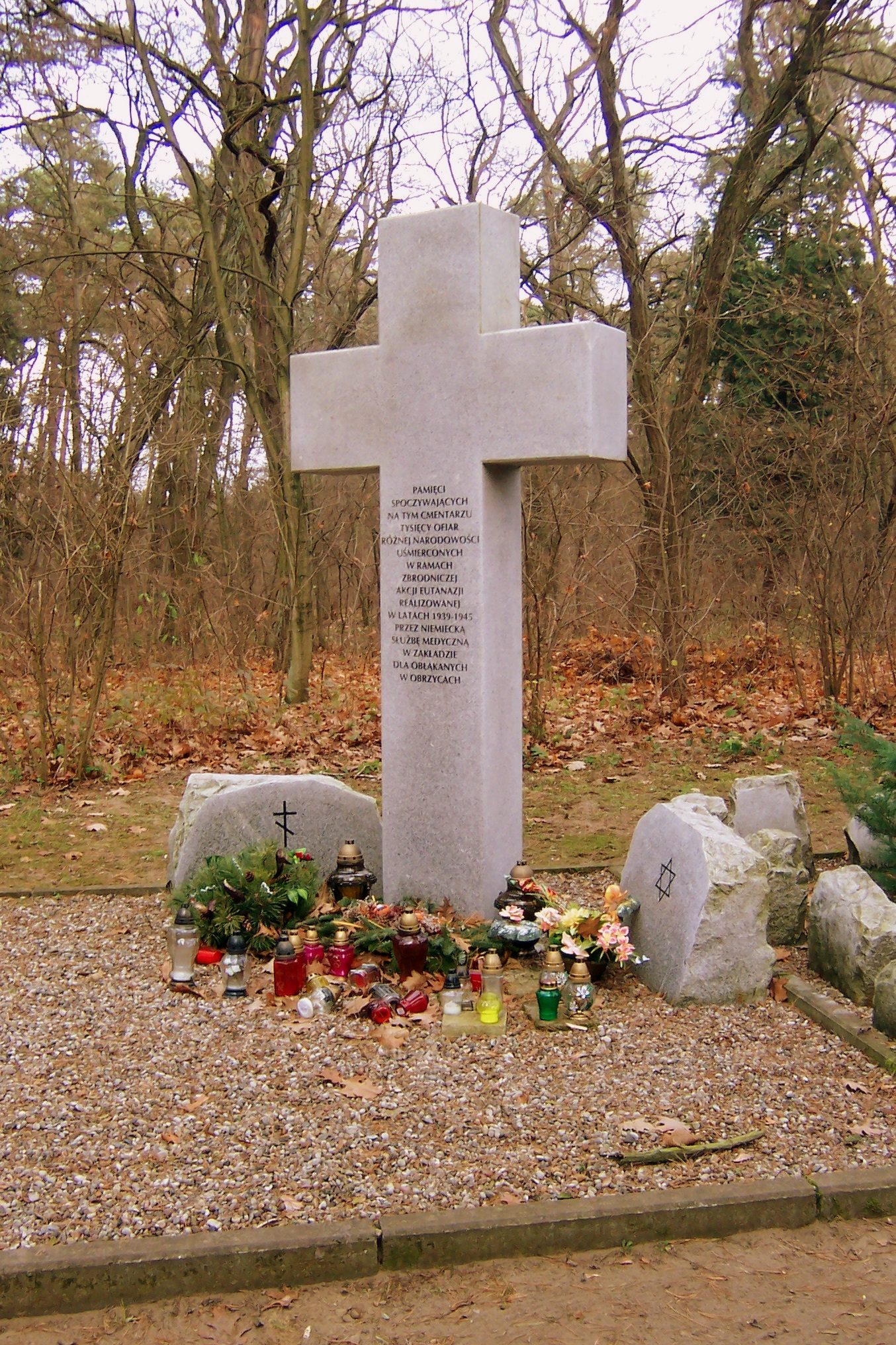
Mass grave of victims of Aktion T4 in Obrzyce

In August 1939, shortly before the German invasion of Poland and outbreak of World War II, the Germans established a camp for Polish civilians in the town. In October 1939 the camp was dissolved and the remaining Polish internees were sent to other camps, including the Sachsenhausen concentration camp, while some were released. From June to October 1940, a camp for captured Polish fugitives from forced labour was based in the town. In Obrawalde (present-day Obrzyce within the city limits), from 1942 to 1945, Germans murdered over 10,000 people, mostly mentally ill and disabled, as part of the Aktion T4, but also prisoners of war and political opponents.

The Polish resistance conducted espionage on German activity in the town.

In the late days of World War II, the town was occupied by Red Army forces in the course of the Vistula–Oder Offensive on 31 January 1945. Left to the Republic of Poland, it was incorporated into Poznań Voivodeship on 7 July. The town's re-incorporation to Poland was confirmed with the Potsdam Agreement and the implementation of the Oder–Neisse line. While the Polish autochthonous minority was allowed to remain in Międzyrzecz, the German speaking majority was expelled. Poles of whom a part had been expelled or left from former Kresy territories, annexed by the Soviet Union, re-settled the town.

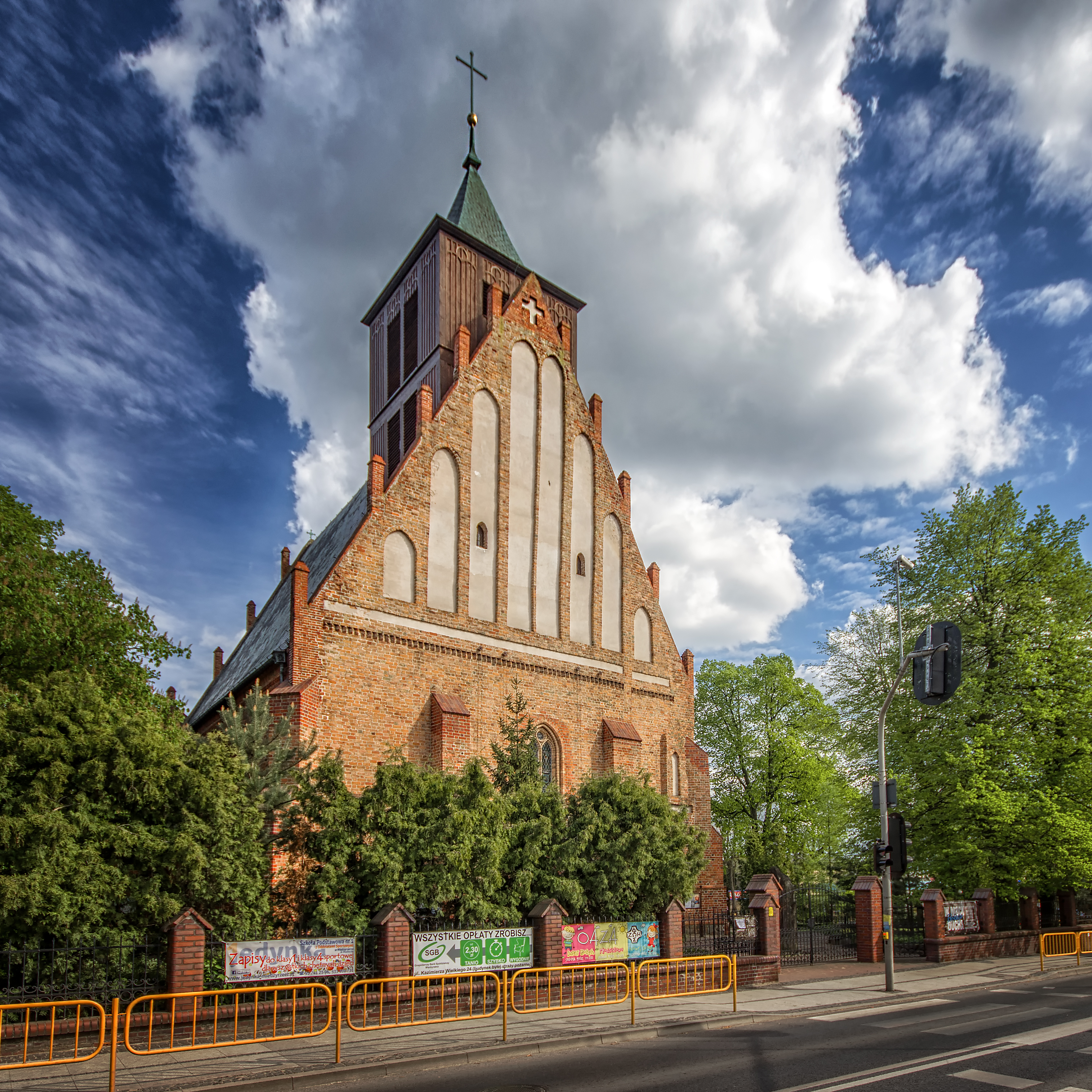
Gothic Saint John the Baptist church

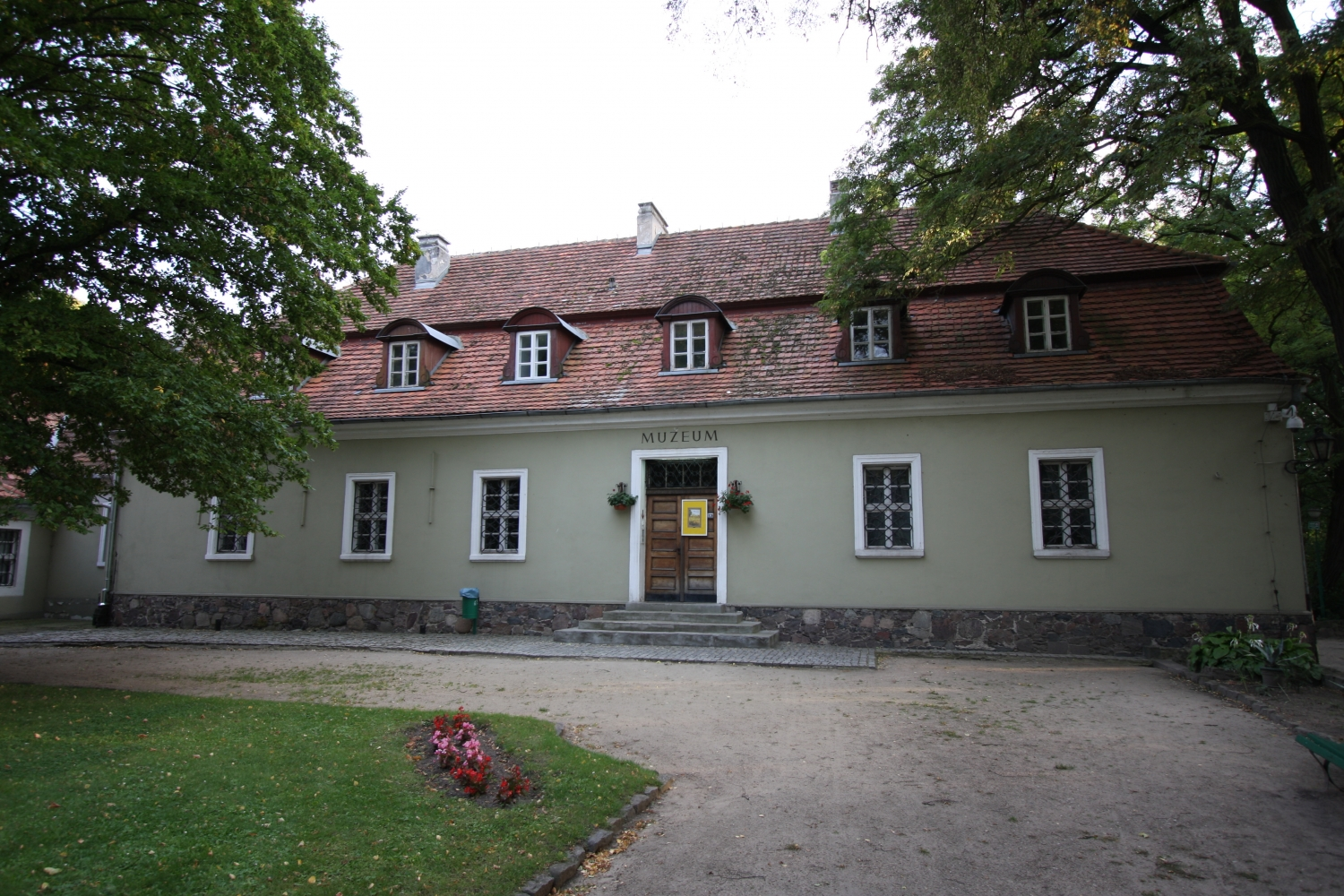
18th-century residence of the starosts, now a museum

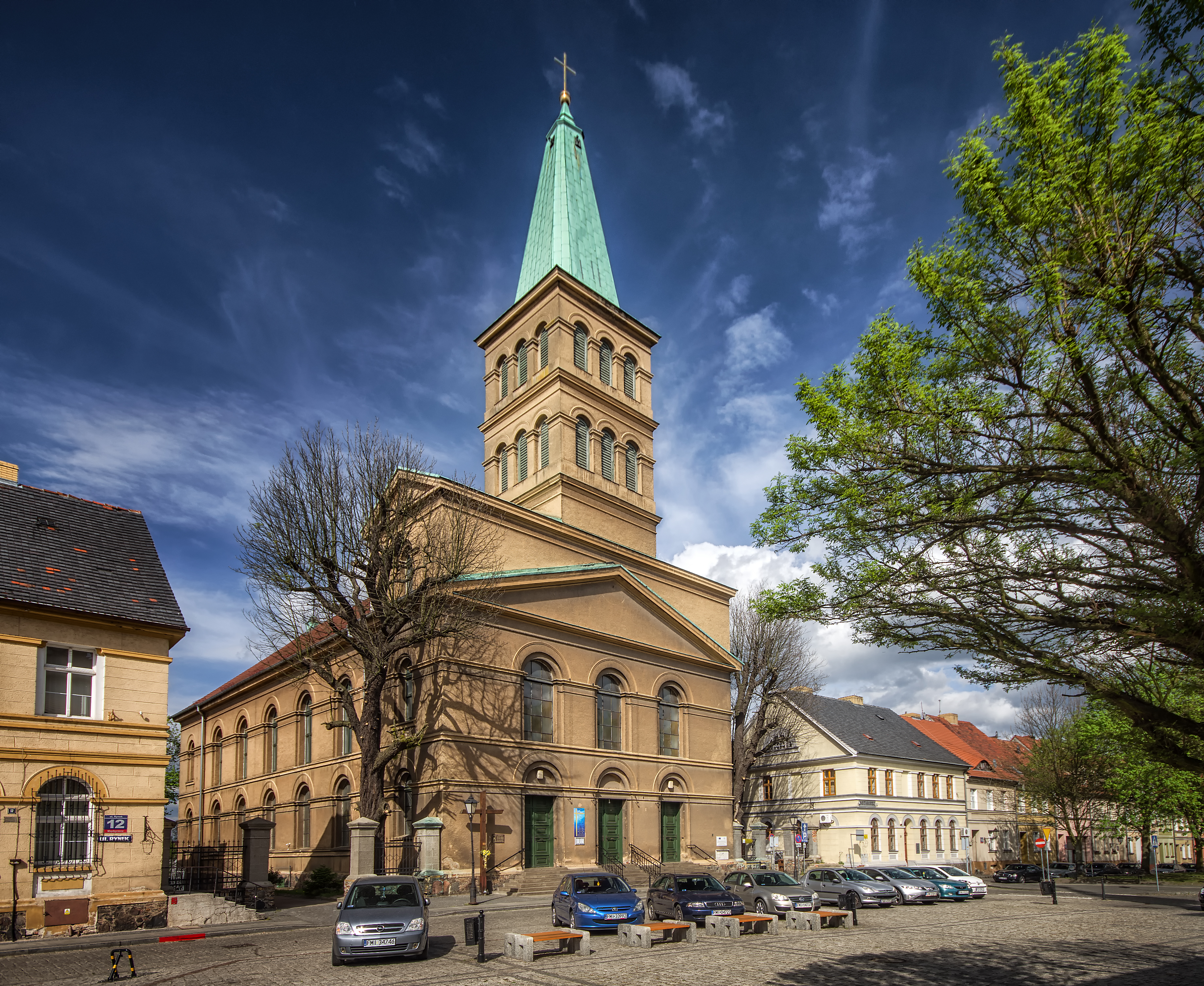
Saint Adalbert church

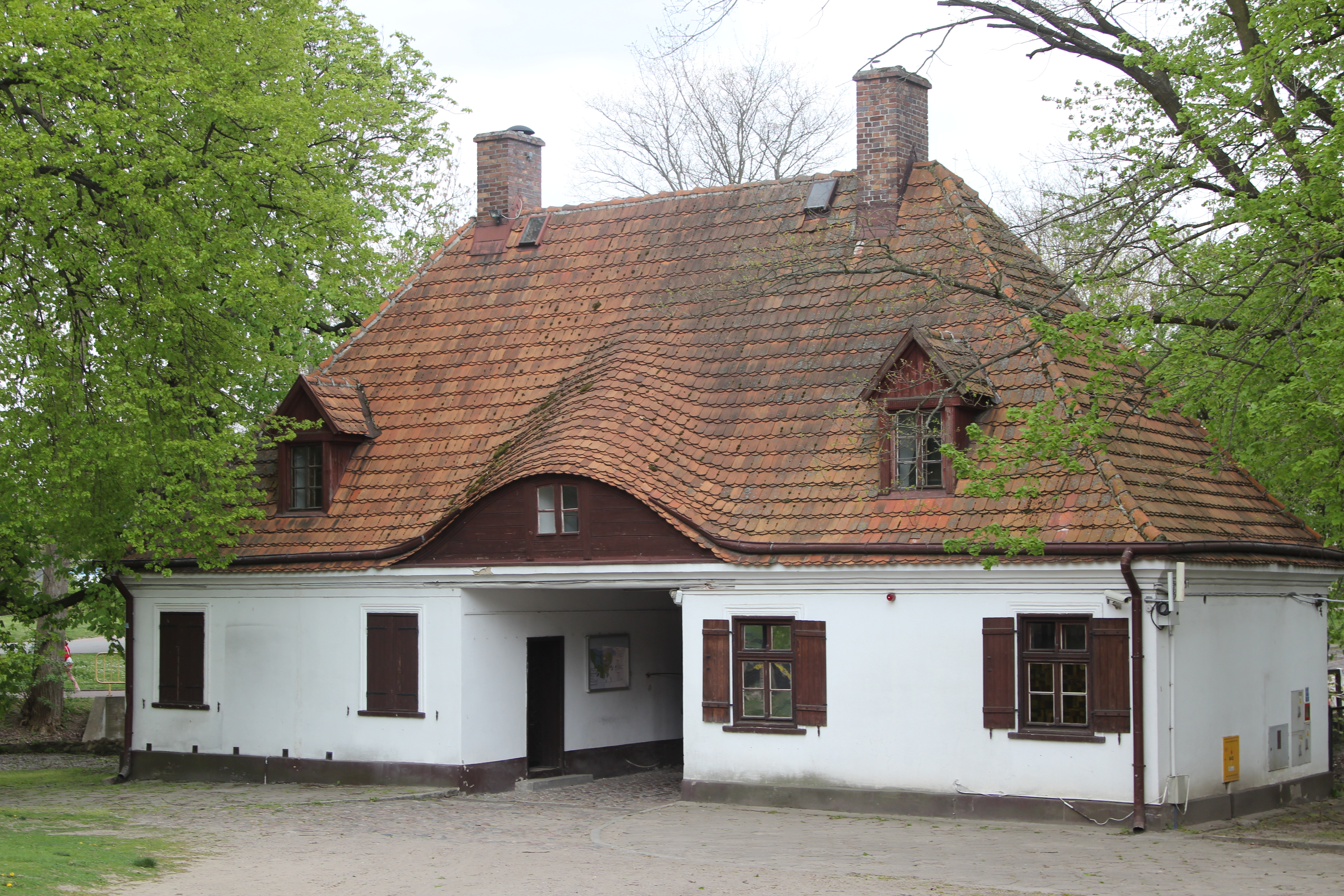
Old gatehouse

== Sport ==
- MKS Orzeł Międzyrzecz (founded 15 April 1945) – men's football club (Polish league level 6)
- KS Orzeł Międzyrzecz – men's volleyball club (Polish league level 3)
- MKT Tenis Club Poland-Orzeł Międzyrzecz (founded 15 November 1993) – men's and women's tennis club
- MSBS Międzyrzecz – men's duplicate bridge club
- MTB MOSiW Międzyrzecz – men's and women's cycling (mountain biking) club

== Notable people ==
- Salomon Jacob Cohen (1771-1845), scholar
- Christian Samuel Theodor Bernd (1775–1854), linguist and heraldist
- Meyer Landsberg (1810–1870), rabbi.
- Adolph Kullak (1823–1862), pianist and musicologist
- Rudolf E. A. Havenstein (1857–1923), director of the Reichsbank
- Peter Berling (1934–2017), actor and writer
- Peter Iden (1934–2026) theater and art critic
- Erdmann Sturm (born 1937), theologian and scholar
- Łukasz Leja, Polish-born American artist
- Dawid Murek (born 1977), volleyball player
- Rafał Maślak (born 1989), male model
- Kamil Jóźwiak (born 1998), footballer

== Twin towns – sister cities ==
See twin towns of Gmina Międzyrzecz.

== See also ==
- Regenwurmlager
- Synagogue in Międzyrzecz

== Bibliography ==
- Chmielewski, Andrzej (2014). "Obozy dla internowanych Polaków na terenie Międzyrzecza w latach 1939-1940 w świetle wspomnień byłych więźniów". Ziemia międzyrzecka w przeszłości (in Polish). XII. Międzyrzecz and Zielona Góra. ISBN 978-83-60218-41-9.
