= Karl Siegmund von Seckendorff =

Karl Siegmund von Seckendorff (26 November 1744 – 26 April 1785) was a German military officer, poet, and composer.

== Life ==
He was born in Erlangen, Bavaria, the son of a Bavarian margrave and part of the Franconian aristocratic family Seckendorff. He served in the military from 1763 in Austria, and later in Prussia. In 1775 he became the chamberlain of Weimar where he joined the circle of Duchess Anna Amalia of Brunswick-Wolfenbüttel.

In Weimar, he supervised the Hofkapelle, and there began to pursue his literary and artistic ideas. He was especially inspired by Goethe, though Goethe thought little of his music. He translated The Sorrows of Young Werther into French, and enjoyed composing music for poems by Goethe, even before they were published, including Der König in Thule and Der Fischer. He published three collections called Volks- und andere Lieder (1779-1782). He wrote a music monodrama entitled Proserpina (produced in Weimar, 1778), whose success was due to Goethe.

Disappointed with his lack of success, in 1784, he moved to Ansbach to become the Prussian ambassador to the Franconian Circle.

== Works ==
=== Texts ===
- Superba, libretto for Singspiel, composed by Ernst Wilhelm Wolf (Weimar, 1779)
- Das Rad des Schicksals, oder die Geschichte des Thoangesis (Dessau, 1783)
- Kalliste, Trauerspiel (Dessau 1783)

=== Musical settings ===
- Proserpina, Singspiel, (Weimar, 1778)
- Der Blumenraub (1784) (also libretto)
