= Łukasz Leja =

Polish-born American artist

Łukasz Leja is a Polish-born American multidisciplinary visual artist, living in New York City. He is known for his work as a figurative painter, but also works as a photographer and mixed media artist.

== Life and career ==
Łukasz Leja is originally from Międzyrzecz, Poland. Leja is known as a figurative painter and usually works with oil on canvas. His paintings, influenced by his architectural background, and depict subjects related to queer love, kink, and sex.

Leja won the Tom of Finland Foundation's Emerging Artist Competition in 2022, which led to more exhibitions in the United States and abroad. His first solo exhibition, Home is where the h<3rd is (2024), took place at NAD Gallery in New York City. In 2025, Leja completed a three-month artist in residency at the Tom of Finland Foundation, ending with an exhibition, Luke of Poland (2025), which featured 12 oil paintings, a table collage, a woven blanket, a 50-page zine, and prints of his earlier works.

== Exhibitions ==
- 2024, Home is where the h<3rd is, NAD Gallery, New York City
- 2025, Luke of Poland, Tom of Finland Foundation, Los Angeles, California
- 2025, My Romantic Ideal, The Bureau of General Services – Queer Division, New York City
- 2025–2026, Satyriasis, Motto, Paris, France
