= Synagogue in Międzyrzecz =

Synagogue in Poland

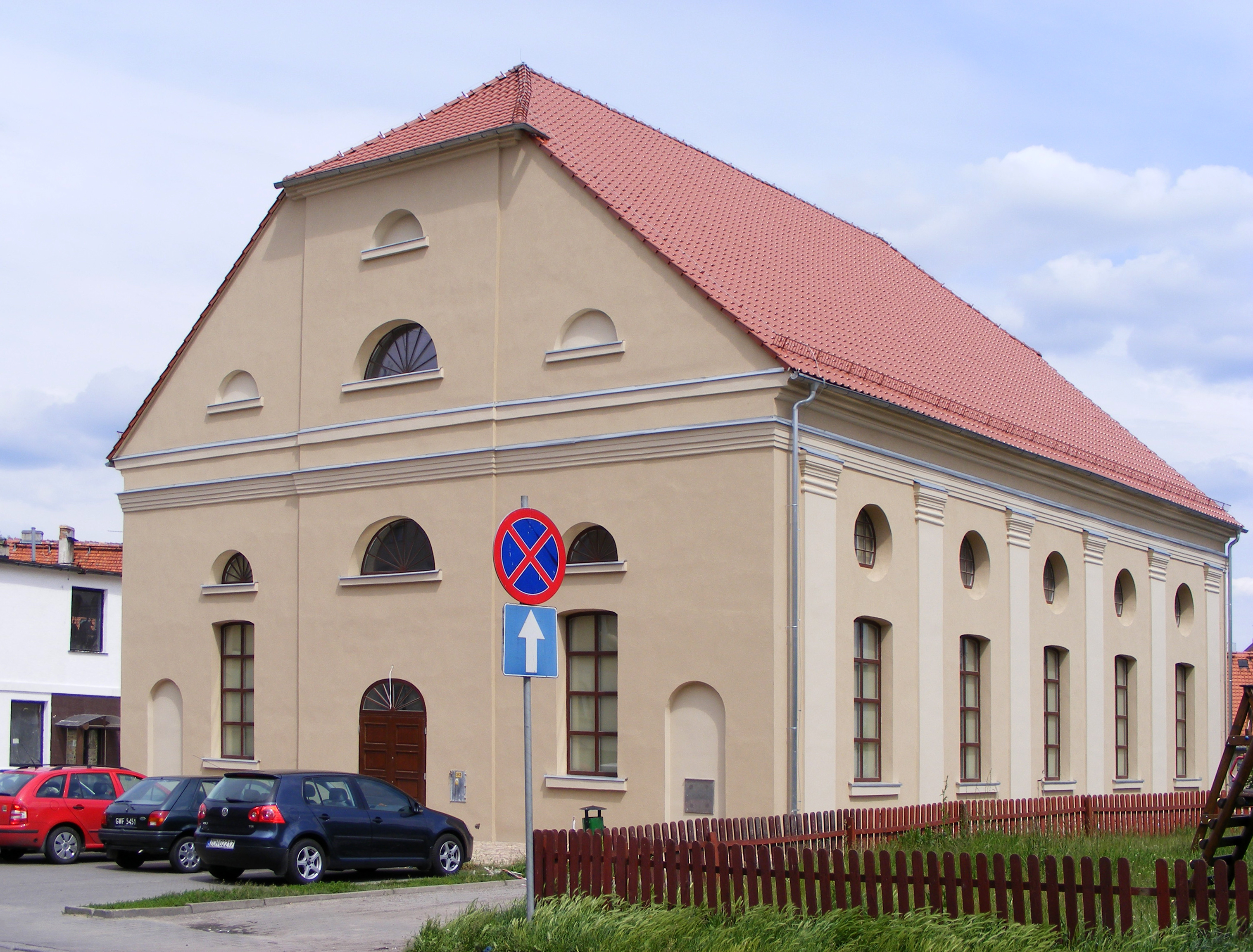
- Synagogue, June 2009

Religion
- Affiliation: Judaism
- Ecclesiastical or organisational status: Under renovation

Location
- Location: 2 Księdza Skargi Street; Międzyrzecz
- Country: Poland
- Interactive map of Synagogue in Międzyrzecz
- Coordinates: 52°26′38″N 15°34′44″E

Architecture
- Established: 1825
- Completed: 1827
- Materials: Brick

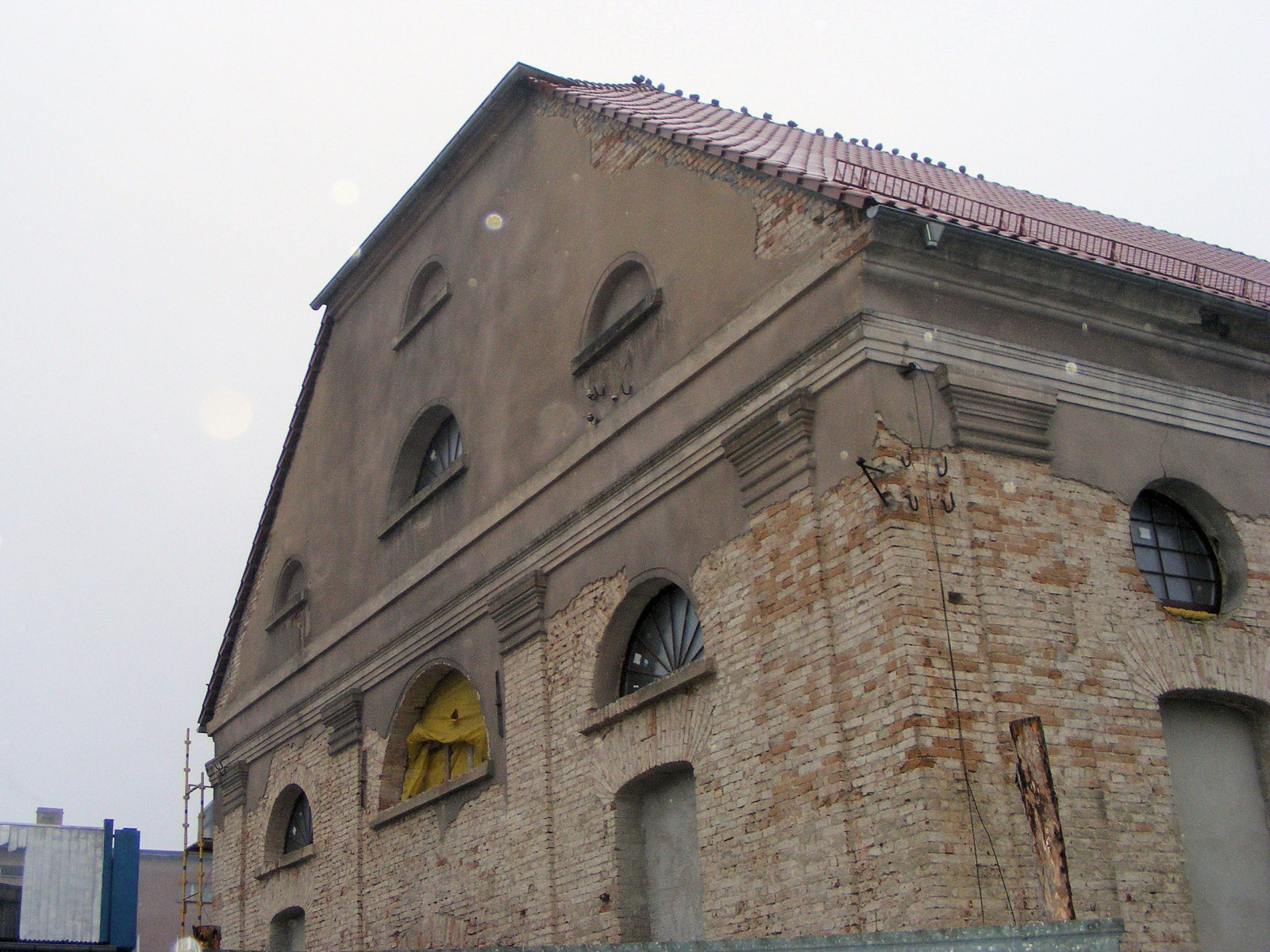
Synagogue renovation, November 2007

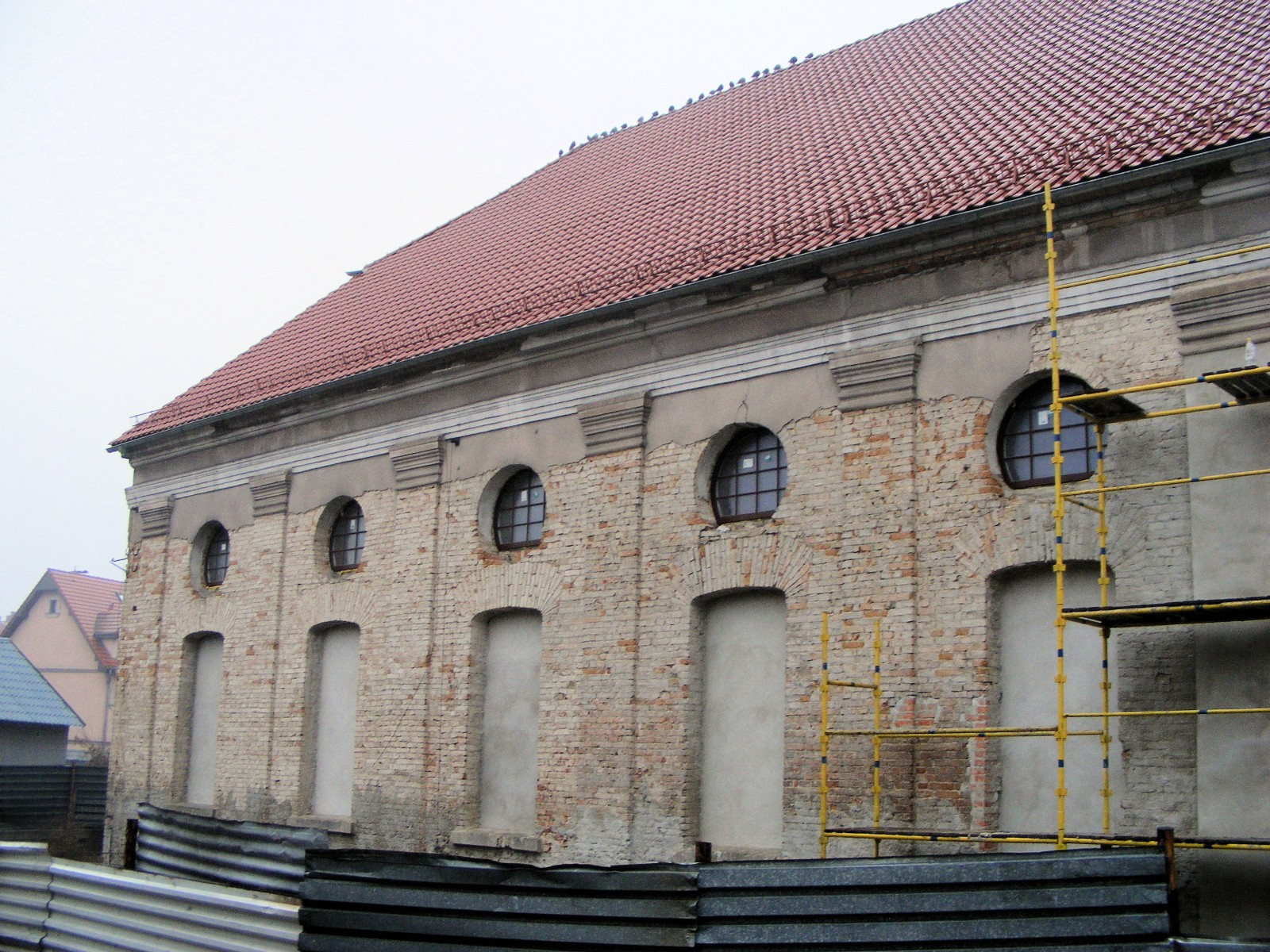
Synagogue renovation, November 2007

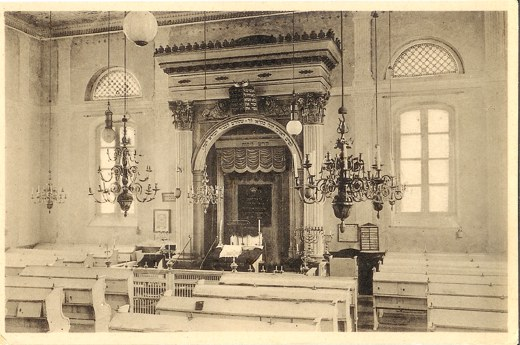
Synagogue interior, circa 1930

The Synagogue in Międzyrzecz is a synagogue located in Międzyrzecz, Poland, at 2 Księdza Skargi Street, formerly known as Jewish Street.

== History ==
The synagogue was constructed between 1825 and 1827 on the site of the Old Synagogue in Międzyrzecz, which was destroyed by fire on 18 April 1824. The building was erected in the first year, with interior finishing completed over the next two years. Its architecture reflects traditional Orthodox synagogue design, indicating the conservative stance of the local Jewish community, which resisted the influence of the Haskalah movement prevalent in nearby towns. This choice likely stemmed from the influence of Jews from surrounding villages who shunned the Jewish Enlightenment.

In 1865, the synagogue underwent a major renovation. It is unclear when religious services ceased, but they likely became less frequent after Adolf Hitler's rise to power in 1933. During the Kristallnacht of 9–10 November 1938, the synagogue remained largely undamaged but was subsequently closed and converted into a warehouse. Its movable furnishings were likely dispersed during this period. The building survived World War II in this state.

After the war, the synagogue was nationalized and taken over by the Polish state. Its interior was significantly altered to serve new functions. An entrance was cut through the Torah ark on the eastern wall, partially preserving its decorative frame, and all rectangular windows were bricked up. In 1963, it was listed as a heritage site, with the designation renewed in 1976. Conservation recommendations protected the exterior and interior elements, including the matroneum and the Torah ark, but no renovations occurred between 1945 and 1989.

On 17 March 1999, the Jewish Community of Szczecin sought to reclaim the synagogue under the 1997 restitution law, intending to restore it and establish a Jewish cultural center or museum. The Lubusz Land Museum in Zielona Góra offered support and artifacts for an exhibition. Due to financial constraints, the community abandoned the plan, and the building fell into further disrepair.

In the early 21st century, a private entrepreneur purchased the synagogue, planning to convert it into a commercial and office space after renovation. Major construction work was completed by the end of 2005, with interior work continuing during winter. The renovated building will house a shopping center with approximately 500 m² of retail space on the ground and upper floors. Bricked-up windows were restored, and the exterior was refurbished. The Torah ark frame has been preserved and highlighted.

In January 2007, during the removal of plaster from the front façade, a Hebrew inscription above the main entrance was uncovered: "פתחו לי שערי צדק (...) אורח י", translating literally to "Open for me the gates of righteousness (...) his guests". In the Millennium Bible, it reads: "Open to me the gates of righteousness: I will enter and give thanks to the Lord" (Ps 118:19). The inscription was later re-plastered.

== Architecture ==
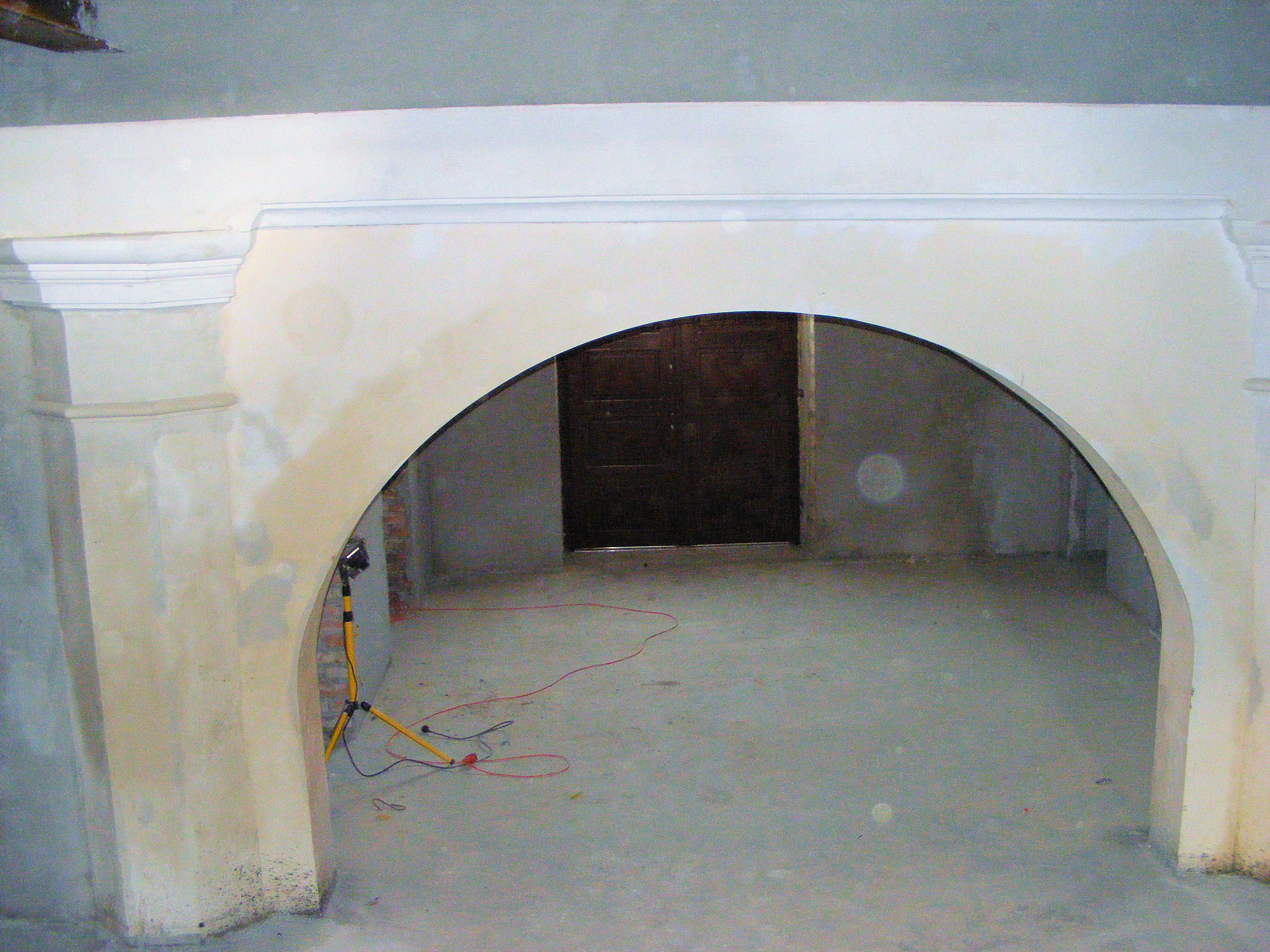
Entrance portal to the church porch

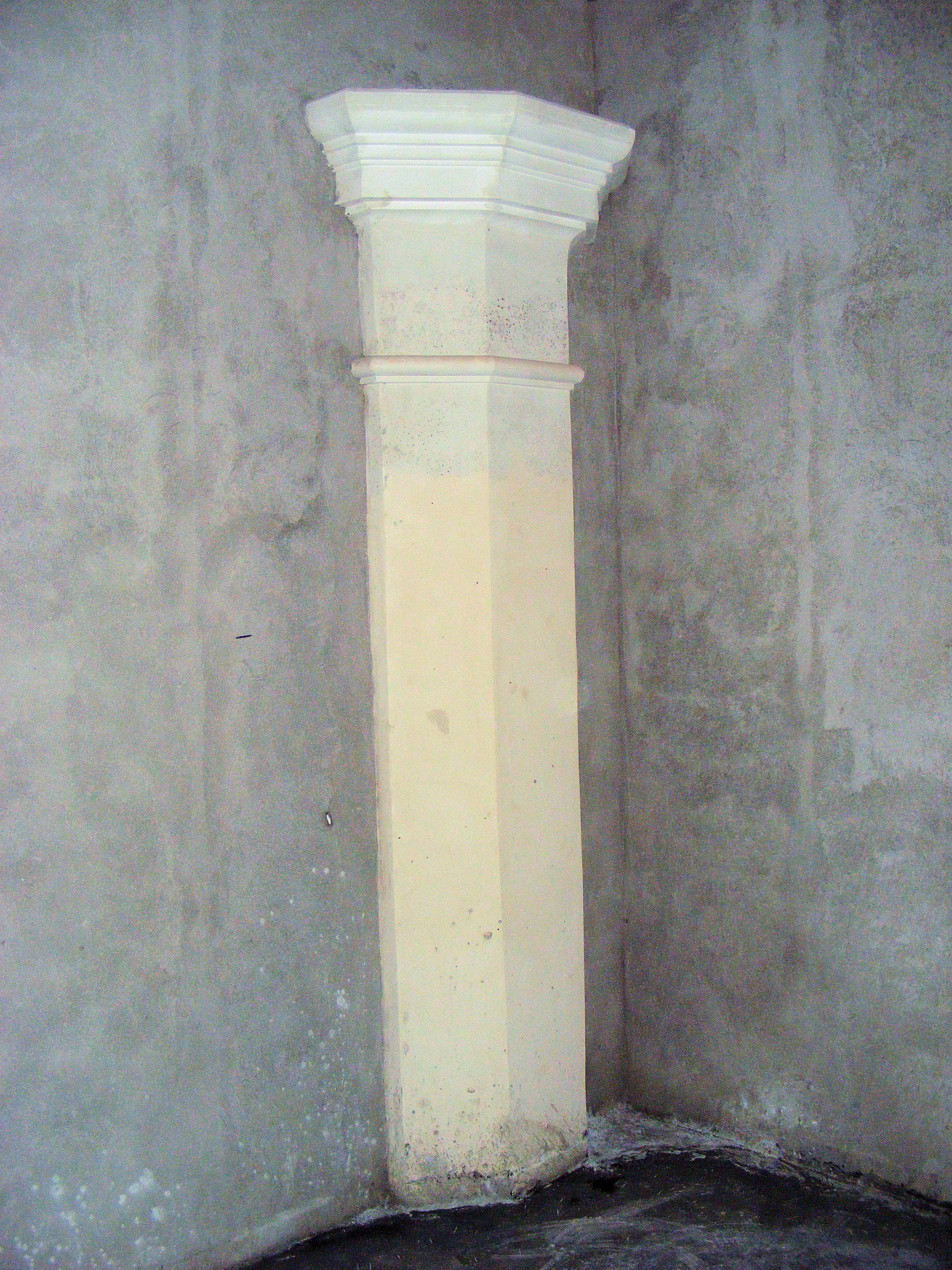
Wall pillar supporting the former matroneum

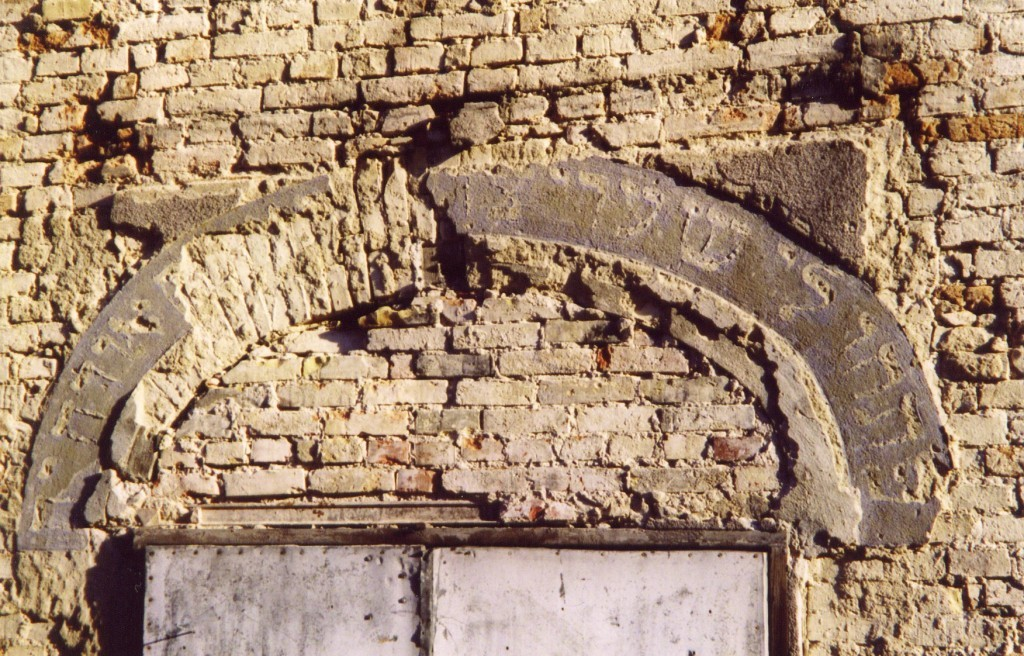
Now-removed inscription above the main entrance

The brick synagogue, built in the late classical style, has a rectangular plan measuring 17.4 by 22.6 meters and a height of about 14 meters. The interior features a rectangular main prayer hall in the western section, accessed through a small church porch. Above it, an open matroneum overlooks the main hall, accessible via a separate entrance on the western wall leading directly to the gallery stairs. The building is topped with a hip roof.

The vertical design is articulated by pilasters with capitals connected by a profiled inter-story cornice. Between the pilasters are tall, rectangular windows. In the horizontal layout, the inter-story cornice and a row of circular windows on the long walls shape the façade's composition. The gable walls feature semicircular windows on either side of the cornice.

The single-nave prayer hall, 6.5 meters high, originally had a floor slightly below street level, accessed by a few steps, a design complying with regulations prohibiting synagogues from being taller than churches. This allowed for a high prayer hall. A two-entrance bimah originally stood at the hall's center but was likely moved in front of the Torah ark after the 1865 renovation, following trends in German synagogues.

Little is known about the synagogue's movable furnishings. Late 19th- and early 20th-century sources mention:

- Three rows of carved benches
- An altar retable with four candelabra of chased brass from the early 18th century
- A small two-tier chandelier of brass from the 17th century, topped with a German double-headed eagle
- Several silver Torah finials, inscribed with dedications suggesting they were 320 years old
- Two Rococo tases of chased silver with a Berlin hallmark featuring the letter F and a bear, and a mark by master Müller
- One neoclassical tas with a Berlin hallmark featuring the letter I and an unclear maker's mark

=== Torah ark ===
The eastern wall retains the preserved frame of the Torah ark, flanked by two columns with Corinthian capitals painted gold, supporting an acroterion with gilded details. At its center is an arched niche, crowned by two lions, originally housing the Torah scroll. The niche is flanked by two pilasters supporting a small entablature. Post-World War II, a door was cut through this area.

The Torah ark closely resembles that of the now-destroyed synagogue in Frankfurt (Oder) from 1823, suggesting both may be the work of the same architect, given the stylistic, temporal, and geographic similarities.

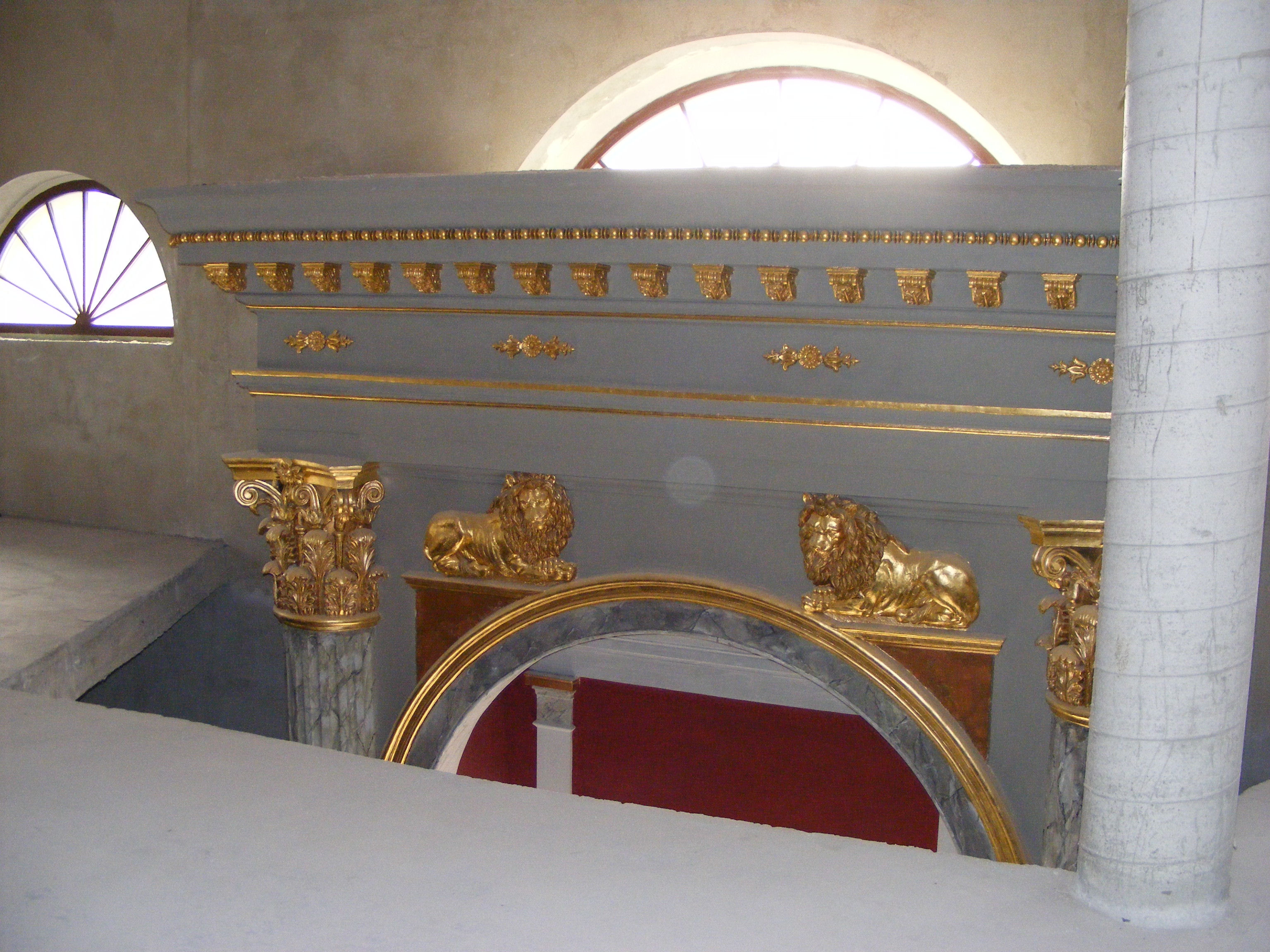
Upper part of the Torah ark

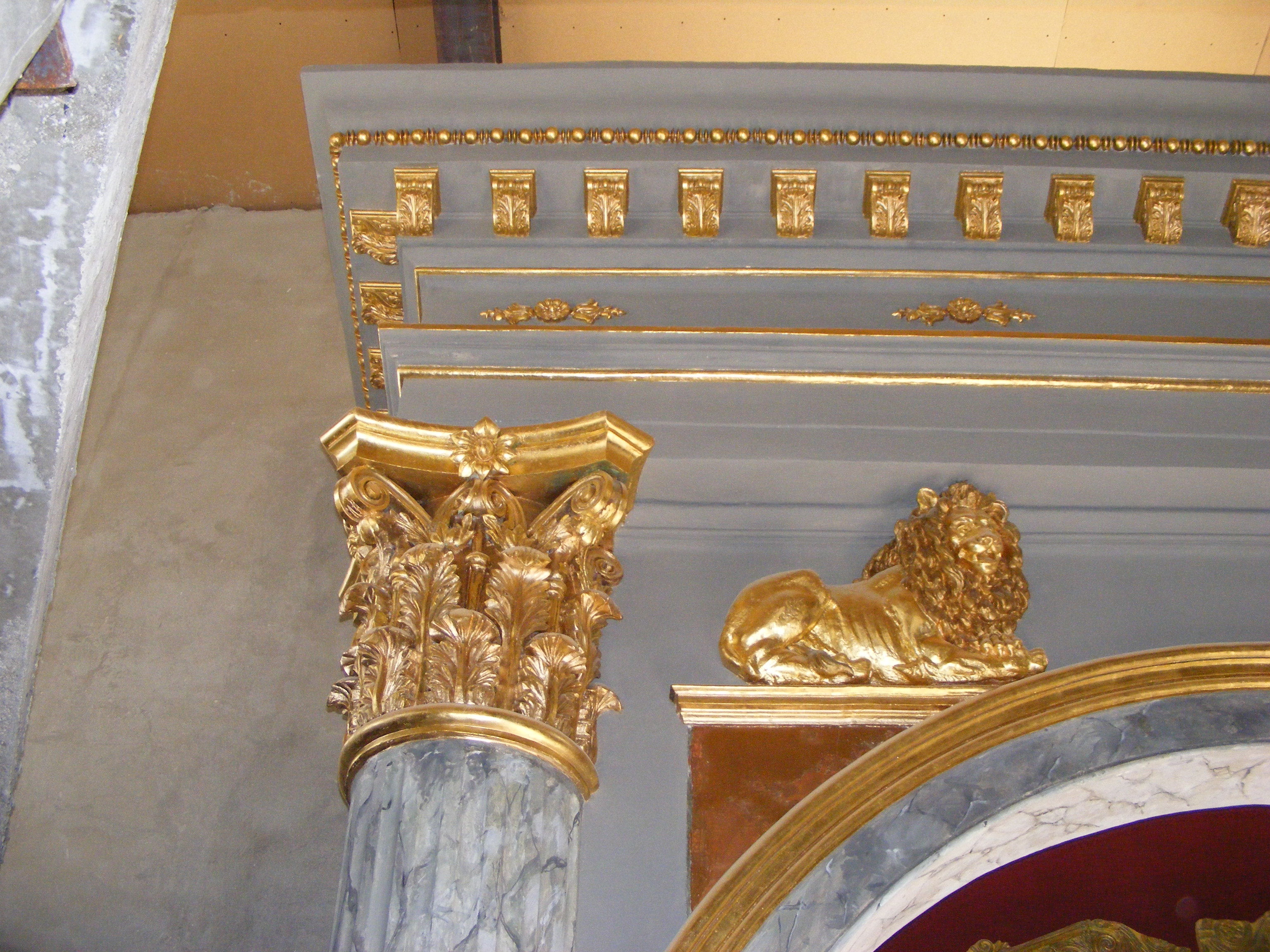
Details of the Torah ark

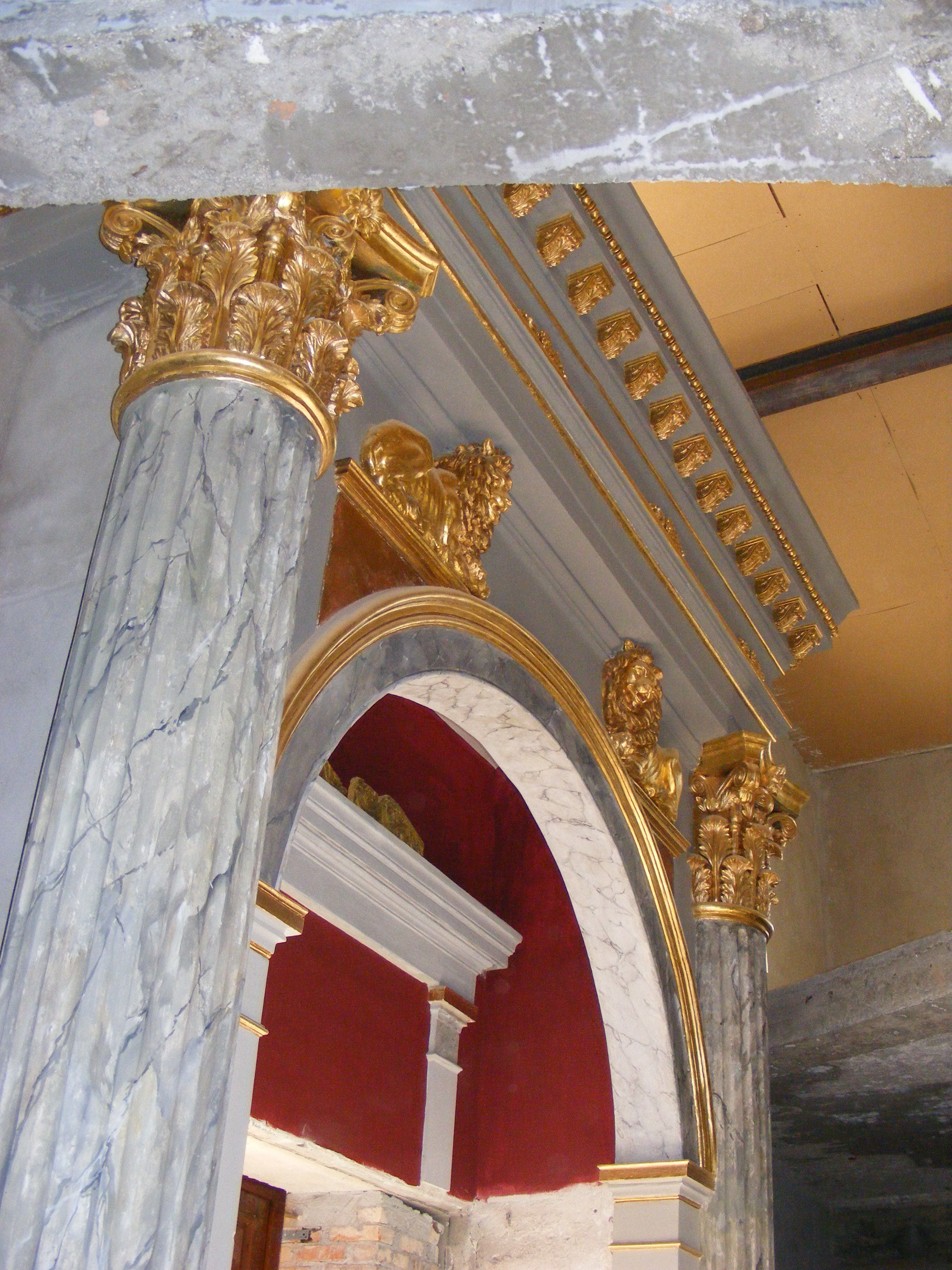
Upper part of the Torah ark

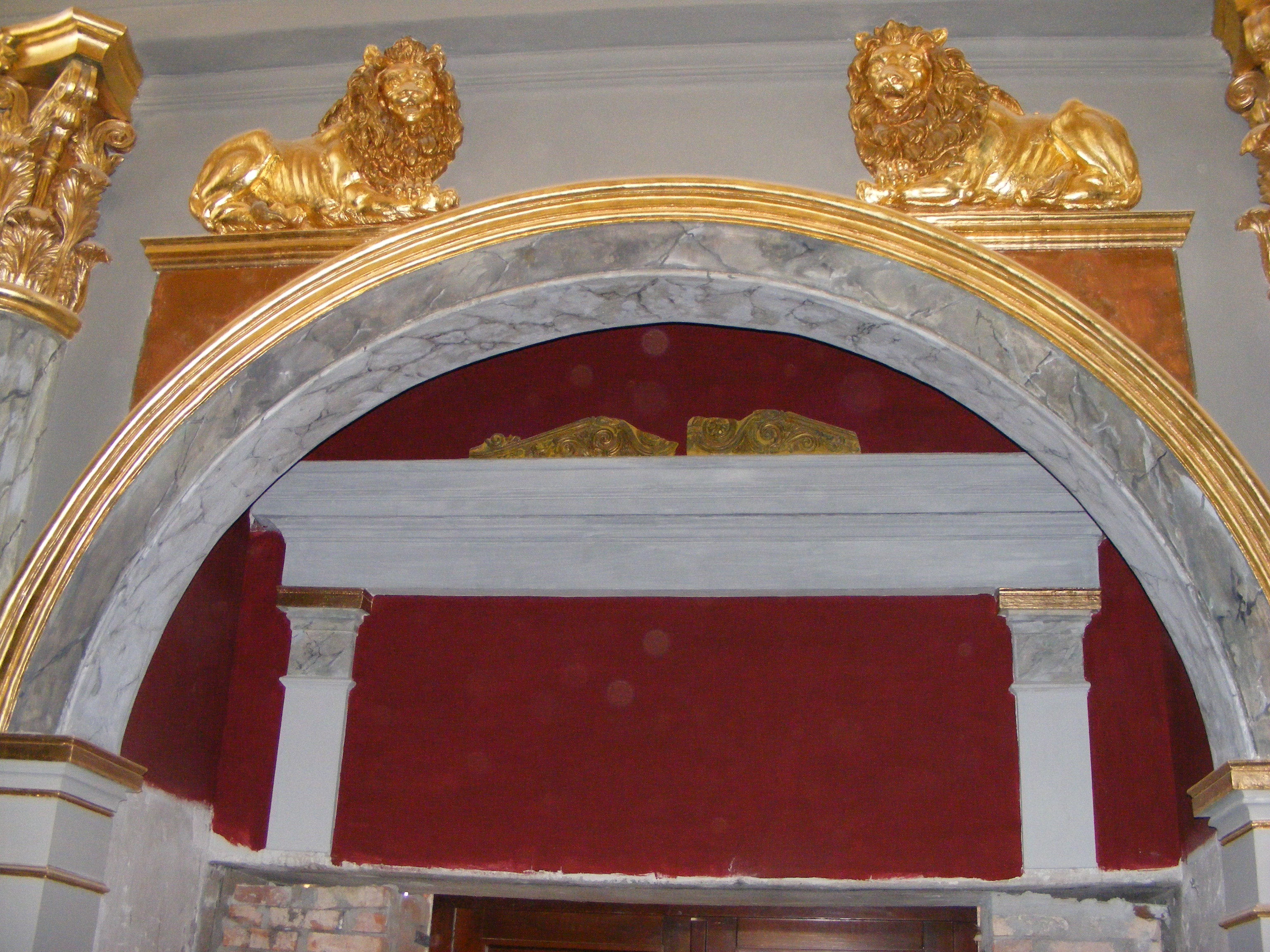
Details of the Torah ark

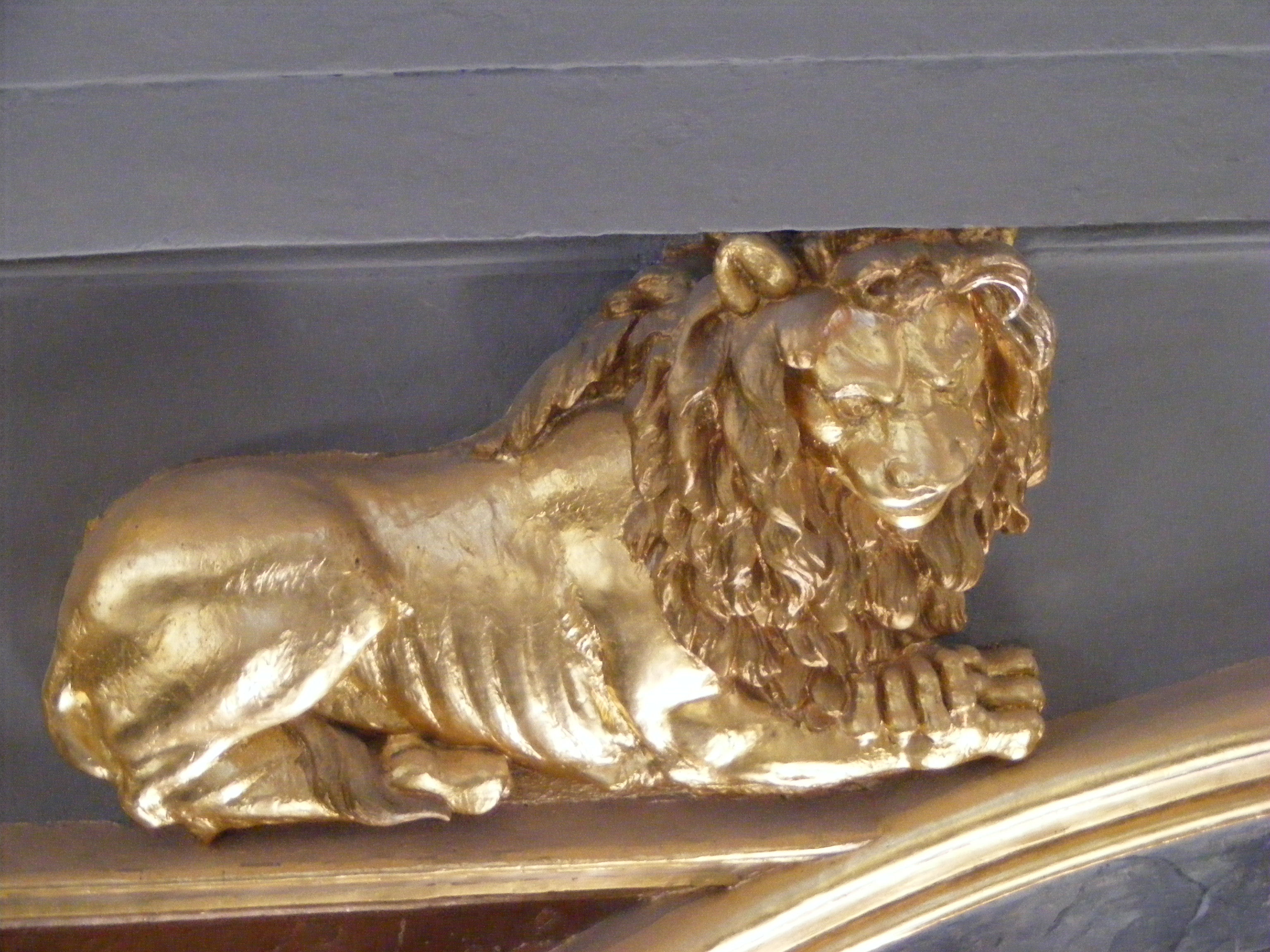
Lion on the Torah ark
