= Der Töpfer =

Der Töpfer (The Potter) is a singspiel, described as a komische Oper, in one act by Johann André. The libretto was by the composer. The work was one of the first German operas to be published in full score.

== Performance history ==
The opera was first performed in Hanau on 22 January 1773. It was a success and was praised by Johann Wolfgang von Goethe for its simplicity and beauty.

== Roles ==
Role	Voice type	Premiere Cast, 22 January 1773 (Conductor:)
Marthe	soprano	
Hannchen, her daughter	soprano	
Gürge, a peasant	tenor	
Amschel, a Jew	bass	

== Synopsis ==
Marthe, hoping to win a lottery, tries to put off the marriage of her daughter Hannchen to Gürge with the intention of making a better match.
