= Clara Kathleen Rogers =

American opera singer (1844 – 1931)

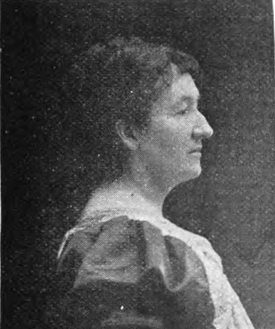
Clara Kathleen Rogers (1895)

Clara Kathleen Barnett Rogers (January 14, 1844 – March 8, 1931), was an English-born American composer, singer, writer, and music educator. She wrote books about singing and her career.

== Early life and education ==
Rogers was born in Cheltenham, England, into a musical family. Her grandfather, Robert Lindley, was a cellist; her parents, composer John Barnett and Eliza, a singer, were her first music teachers. When Rogers was twelve, her family moved to Germany to further their children's musical education. Clara was admitted to the Leipzig Conservatory at the age of twelve and studied piano with Ignaz Moscheles, Louis Plaidy, and Hans von Bülow. Two of her older siblings also attended the conservatory. During this time, her father returned to England while her mother stayed with her children, a situation which continued throughout the early part of Rogers's career.

Besides piano, Rogers also studied harmony, part writing, violin, cello, and voice while in Leipzig. Composition classes were not open to women at the conservatory until 1859, after conservatory administrators heard the string quartet Rogers had composed at the age of 13. Her classmate, Arthur Sullivan, copied parts for her, found players and arranged a performance of the piece. Rogers spent three years at the conservatory, graduating at sixteen with honors.

== Career and later years ==
Rogers chose to pursue a vocal career and became an opera singer. Performing under the name Clara Doria, she debuted in 1863 in Turin, Italy in the of role Isabelle in Robert le diable by Giacomo Meyerbeer. After touring in Italy and spending five years in London, she came to the United States in 1871 as a member of the Parepa-Rosa Opera Company and spent another seven years as a singer with at least three different troupes. She settled in Boston in 1873.

Her performing career ended in 1878 when she married Henry Munroe Rogers, a lawyer living in Boston, Massachusetts. She and her husband lived in the affluent Back Bay neighborhood, where they hosted musical salons. Her friends included Amy Beach, Margaret Ruthven Lang, George Chadwick, Oliver Wendell Holmes Jr., Amy Lowell, and Henry Wadsworth Longfellow. Longfellow wrote the poem "Stay at Home, My Heart, and Rest" especially for Rogers. She held weekly musicales at her home and helped to promote the careers of her artistic friends. These salons were also occasions for her own compositions to be heard, though she wrote in one of her autobiographies: ‘Had I acquired early in life a good technique in writing for instruments I really think I might have accomplished something worthwhile in orchestral composition."

After her marriage, Rogers took up teaching and composing, which she said was “a supreme delight – amounting at times almost to intoxication!” By the early 1880s, she began publishing some of her songs with the Arthur P. Schmidt company. Her Sonata Dramatico for violin and piano was premiered in 1888 by Charles Martin Loeffler with Rogers herself at the piano. The same year she helped found the Boston Manuscript Club and in 1895 she was invited to join the Manuscript Club of New York by Amy Beach. Rogers joined the faculty of the New England Conservatory in 1902, where she taught voice. Besides composing music she also wrote six books on diction and technique, and three autobiographies.

Rogers died in 1931 in Boston. Her manuscripts and correspondence are in the Library of Congress and at Harvard University.

== Musical output ==
- c. 100 songs
- Piano works; Rhapsody (1880), Scherzo, op. 15 (1883), Romanza, op. 31 (1895)
- String quartet (1866)
- String quartet No. 2
- Sonata Dramatico, op.25 for violin and piano (1888)
- Sonata for violin and piano (Boston, 1893)
- Sonata for cello and piano (Boston, 1893)

== Other publications ==
- The Philosophy of Singing, published in 1893
- My Voice and I, published in 1910
- English Diction in Song and Speech, published in 1912
- Memories of a Musical Career, published in 1919/1920
- The Voice in Speech, published in 1915
- Your Voice and You, published in 1925
- Clearcut Speech in Song, published in 1927
- The Story of Two Lives, published in 1932
- Journal-Letters from the Orient, published in 1934

== Discography ==
- Women at an Exposition: Music Composed by Women and Performed at the 1893 World's Fair in Chicago. Susanne Mentzer, mezzo-soprano; Sunny Joy Langton, soprano; Elaine Skorodin, violin; Kimberly Schmidt, piano. Koch International Classics 3-7240-2H1, 1993.
