= Johann André =

German composer and music publisher (1741–1799)

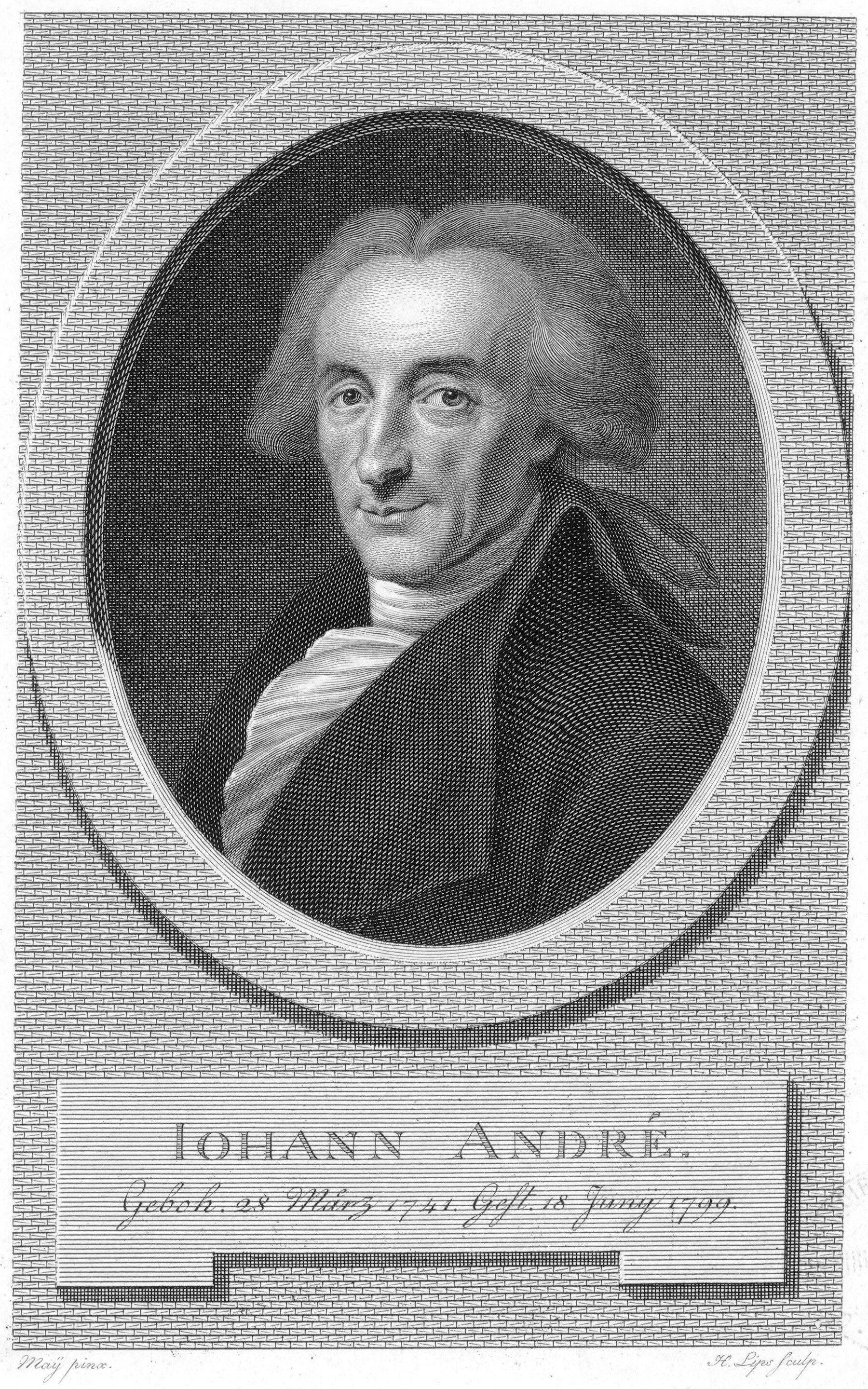
Johann André. Portrait by Johann Heinrich Lips

Johann André (28 March 1741 – 18 June 1799) was a German musician, composer and music publisher of the Classical period. He was born and died in Offenbach am Main.

In 1774, as the patriarch of a Huguenot family, André founded one of the first music publishing houses to be independent of a bookshop, in Offenbach am Main. Among his closest friends in Offenbach were Goethe, at the time of his engagement to Anna Elisabeth Schönemann, and he is pictured in the seventeenth book of Goethe's autobiography Dichtung und Wahrheit with an Offenbach am Main background in 1775.

In 1777, André was appointed musical director at the German theatre in Berlin, the Deutsches Theater, without having to abandon Offenbach am Main, however. He composed some 30 operas, ballads and songs.

His son, Johann Anton André (1775–1842), followed his footsteps into composing and music theory. After taking over the music publishing business from his father in 1799, Johann Anton André acquired Mozart's musical legacy from Mozart's widow Constanze in Vienna. She entrusted him with writing concluding measures to the overture to Don Giovanni, so that it could be performed in concert.

He developed the music publishing business and introduced lithography for printing of notes. Musikhaus André and the Musikverlag Johann André, with their wide-ranging musical archive, still exist today in the centre of Offenbach.

== Works ==
Opus 34, Moderato con moto, I by Johann Andre
Sonatina courtesy of Mutopia Project, duration is 1:38

- Der Töpfer (Hanau, 1773)
- Erwin und Elmire (Frankfurt, 1775)
- Der alte Freyer (Frankfurt, 1775)
- Herzog Michael oder Die Nachtigall (Berlin, 1775)
- Der Barbier von Sevilien oder Die unnütze Vorsicht (Berlin 1776)
- Die Bezauberten oder Peter und Hannchen (Berlin, 1777)
- Der Fürst im höchsten Glanze (Berlin, 1777)
- Die Schadenfreude (Berlin, 1778)
- Der Alchymist oder Der Liebesteufel (Berlin, 1778)
- Laura Rosetti (Berlin, 1778)
- Die Grazien (Berlin, 1778)
- Azakia (Berlin, 1778)
- Claudine von Villa Bella (Berlin, 1778)
- Das tartarische Gesetz (Berlin, 1779)
- Alter schützt vor Thorheit nicht (Mannheim, 1779)
- Die Friedensfeyer oder Die unvermuthete Wiederkunft (Berlin, 1779)
- Friedrichs glorreichster Sieg (Berlin, 1779)
- Kurze Thorheit ist die beste (Berlin, 1780)
- Das wüthende Heer oder Das Mädchen im Thurme (Berlin, 1780)
- Heinrich der Erhabene aus dem Stamme der Brennen (Berlin, 1780)
- Der Zauberspiegel (Berlin, 1781)
- Belmont und Constanze oder Die Entführung aus dem Serail (Berlin, 1781)
- Mehr als Großmuth (Berlin, 1781)
- Elmine (Berlin, 1782)
- Eins wird doch helfen oder Die Werbung aus Liebe (Berlin, 1782)
- Der Liebhaber als Automat oder Die redende Maschine (Berlin, 1782)
- Der Barbier von Bagdad (Berlin, 1783)
- Der Bräutigam in der Klemme (Frankfurt, 1796)

== See also ==
- Alois Senefelder
