= Albrecht Agthe =

German music teacher

Wilhelm Johann Albrecht Agthe (14 April 1790 – 8 October 1873) was a German music teacher.

Agthe was born in Ballenstedt to Karl Christian Agthe, a court organist and composer. He studied under Michael Gotthard Fischer in Erfurt, and in 1810 became a music teacher in Leipzig and a member of the Leipzig Gewandhaus Orchestra. In 1823, he began teaching using Logier's method in Dresden; from 1826 in Posen (where he taught Theodor Kullak); from 1830 in Breslau; and from 1832 in Berlin, where he directed a music school for 13 years.
