= Carl David Stegmann =

German opera singer

Carl David Stegmann (1751 – 27 May 1826) was a German tenor, harpsichordist, conductor, and composer.

== Biography ==
He was born in Staucha near Meissen, the son of Johann Ehrenfried Stegmann and Anna Christiana Bretzner. He married Karoline Johanna Eleanore Linz producing two sons and four daughters. He received his initial musical training from the local organist at Staucha, then studied in Dresden with J.F. Zillich (from 1760), at the Kreuzschule (1766–70) and later under Homilius and the violinist H.F. Weisse. Thereafter he rose rapidly as singer, actor, and harpsichordist; he went to Breslau in 1772 (with the Wäser theatre company), Königsberg in 1773, Heilsberg in 1774 (as court harpsichordist to the Bishop of Ermeland), Danzig in 1775, Königsberg again in 1776 (with the Schuch company) and later appeared in Gotha (at the court theatre). From 1778 to 1783 he made the first of two extended visits to Hamburg, winning particular renown as a harpsichordist. By that time, six of his operas and Singspiels, first produced earlier in Königsberg and Danzig, were attracting performances elsewhere in northern Germany. In 1783 he left Hamburg to join the Grossmann company in Bonn. He then became attached to the court theatre at Mainz in association with which he made highly acclaimed guest appearances in Frankfurt. He sang in the first German-language Don Giovanni (Mainz, 13 March 1789), produced or conducted other operas by Mozart, Salieri, Gluck and Gassmann, composed incidental music (e.g. to Bürger's version of Macbeth, 30 August 1785) and acted in dramas by Lessing and Schiller.

The summit of Stegmann's activities in Frankfurt was the production of his allegorical Singspiel Heinrich der Löwe (15 July 1792) to commemorate the coronation of Emperor Franz II. By the time of his return to Hamburg in November 1792, he was esteemed as a leading operatic producer and adapter, which compensated for the declining vocal prowess that forced him to restrict his appearances to comic roles (Allgemeine Musik-Zeitung i [1798-9], col. 713). In 1798 he joined the directorate of the Hamburg theatre, remaining there until 1811; thereafter he moved to Bonn and attracted attention mainly as a composer of incidental music and a series of instrumental works (Allgemeine Musik-Zeitung iv [1801-2], col. 261), including keyboard and multiple concertos. His earlier close acquaintance with the operas of Gluck and Mozart, and his later keyboard arrangements (published by his friend Simrock) of Haydn's symphonies, Mozart's string quintets and Beethoven's Trios op. 9 enabled him to produce instrumental music notable for contrapuntal and textural ingenuity, combined with an imaginative, if sometimes overladen, instrumentation. As a composer for the theatre, Stegmann has attracted attention for his harmonic and tonal organisation and for using antecedent forms of leitmotif, showing an early interest in dramatic and psychological continuity. He died in Bonn.

His daughter Margaretha Amalie von Neumann sang in the Royal Court Opera in Munich, becoming Court Singer to the King of Bavaria, Max-Josef, in 1812, and later director of the Court Theatre in Munich until she died in 1839.

== Works ==
- Erwin und Elmire (1776)
- Philemon und Baucis (1777)
- Montgolfier (1788)
- Sultan Wampun (1791)
- Heinrich der Löwe (1792)
- Der Triumph der Liebe (1796)

== Sources ==
- McCredie, Anrew D.: "Stegmann, Carl David", in: The New Grove Dictionary of Opera, ed. Stanley Sadie (London, 1992); ISBN 0-333-73432-7.
