= Ernst Wilhelm Wolf =

German composer (1735–1792)

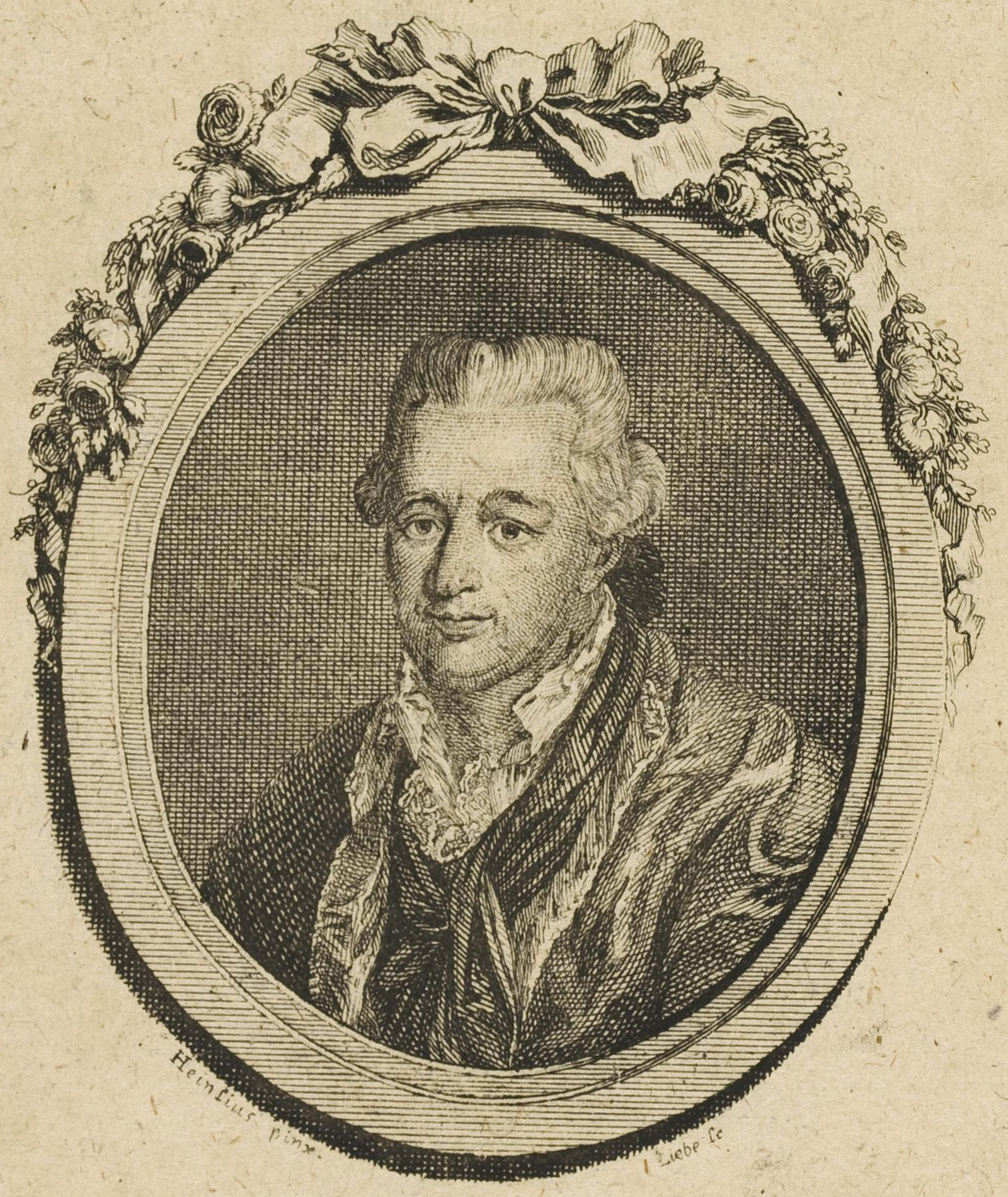
Ernst Wilhelm Wolf in 1781

Ernst Wilhelm Wolf (baptised 25 February 1735 – 29 or 30 November 1792) was a German composer.

== Life ==
Wolf was born in Grossen Behringen in Thuringia, today part of the Hörselberg-Hainich municipality. His elder brother Ernst Friedrich was a composer and organist who studied under Gottfried Heinrich Stölzel. Ernst Wilhelm's musical talent manifested itself early, and already by age nine he was a skilled harpsichordist, particularly apt at figured bass realization. Wolf attended gymnasiums at Eisenach and at Gotha, where he became a choir prefect. It was in Gotha that Wolf first heard the music of Carl Philipp Emanuel Bach and Carl Heinrich Graun; he was particularly fascinated with Bach's work. The admiration was mutual: a performance of some of Wolf's compositions in 1752 drew praise from Bach. Wolf and Bach's friendship lasted throughout their lives; Wolf helped collect subscriptions for Carl Philipp Emanuel Bach's für Kenner und Liebhaber (for Connoisseurs and Amateurs) works (piano sonatas and rondos).

Following his brother's advice, in 1755 Wolf entered the University of Jena. There he became the director of the collegium musicum, for which he composed a number of works. After three years he moved to Leipzig in 1758, and then to Naumburg, where he worked as music teacher for the von Ponickau family. Wolf later decided to journey to Italy, but ended up settling in Weimar, where he spent the rest of his life. He first worked as music teacher to Duchess Anna Amalia and her sons, then became court Konzertmeister (1761), organist (1763) and finally Kapellmeister (1772). In 1770 Wolf married Maria Carolina Benda (1742–1820), daughter of the famous Bohemian violinist and composer Franz Benda. At one point an offer was made to Wolf by Frederick II of Prussia to succeed Carl Philipp Emanuel Bach, but Wolf declined, possibly at Anna Amalia's instigation. In his later years Wolf's activity slowed down, and he became increasingly depressed. After a stroke, Wolf's health started deteriorating, and he died in late 1792.

Wolf's reputation during his lifetime was very high already from the earliest years, when he was a child prodigy. It further increased after his sojourns in Gotha, Jena, and Leipzig, partly through the efforts of Johann Friedrich Doles, an important practitioner of Protestant church music in the orbit of late 18th-century Leipzig, and Johann Adam Hiller, composer and writer on music. Wolf's music was known far beyond Weimar and his writings were acclaimed by experts (even though Wolf wrote primarily for amateurs).

== Works ==
The most important part of Wolf's surviving oeuvre is his instrumental music. He composed at least thirty-five symphonies, of which twenty-six survive, some twenty-five harpsichord/piano concertos, more than 60 keyboard sonatas, and numerous chamber works, including string quartets, piano quintets, and other music. Stylistically these works are close to those of the composers of the Mannheim school. Particularly interesting are the harpsichord sonatas, which reflect the influence of C.P.E. Bach, and generally use more forward-looking structures. Like Bach and older masters, Wolf advocated studying counterpoint, and recommended Johann Sebastian Bach's preludes and fugues to his students; however, his views went out of fashion in the late 18th century.

Wolf also produced a great number of stage and sacred works. For the Weimar court, he composed some 20 Singspiele, influenced by Johann Adam Hiller's style. Although these works are not as advanced as his instrumental music, some include very progressive passages in the vein of Wolfgang Amadeus Mozart. Wolf's sacred music shows the influence of C.P.E. Bach and Carl Heinrich Graun.
