= Karl Christian Agthe =

German organist and composer

Karl Christian Agthe (16 June 1762 – 27 November 1797) was a German organist and composer.

Born in Hettstedt, Agthe served as court organist to Frederick Albrecht, Prince of Anhalt-Bernburg. Among his compositions are six Singspiele, a ballet, and piano sonatas. He died in Ballenstedt; a son, Albrecht Agthe, was a music teacher.
