= List of compositions by Wilhelm Kienzl =

Wilhelm Kienzl

This is a list of compositions by the Austrian composer Wilhelm Kienzl (1857–1941).

== Operas ==
Opus	Title	Genre	Subdivisions	Libretto	Première date	Place, theatre
20	Urvasi		3 acts	A. Gödel, after Kālidāsa	20 February 1886	Dresden
40	Heilmar der Narr		prelude and 3 acts	Wilhelm Kienzl (father), after M. Hartmann	8 March 1892	Munich
45	Der Evangelimann	musikalisches Schauspiel	2 acts	Kienzl, after L F Meissner	4 May 1895	Berlin, Hofoper
50	Don Quixote	musikalische Tragikomödie	3 acts	Kienzl, after Miguel de Cervantes	18 November 1898	Berlin, Hofoper
75	In Knecht Ruprechts Werkstatt	Weihnachtsmärchen	1 act	H. Voigt	25 December 1907	Graz
85	Der Kuhreigen	musikalisches Schauspiel	3 acts	R. Barka, after R. H. Bartsch	23 November 1911	Vienna, Volksoper
90	Das Testament	musikalische Komödie	2 acts	Kienzl, after Peter Rosegger	6 December 1916	Vienna, Volksoper
100	Hassan der Schwärmer		3 acts	H. Bauer, after One Thousand and One Nights	27 February 1925	Chemnitz
102	Sanctissimum	melodramatische Allegorie	1 act	H. Bauer	14 February 1925	Vienna
110	Hans Kipfel	Singspiel	1 act	H. Bauer	1926	Vienna

== Melodramas ==
- Die Brautfahrt (The Bridal Voyage) Op. 9
- 2 Melodramas Op. 97
- Die Jungfrau und die Nonne (The Virgin and the Nun) Op. 98
- Eine Marienballade von François Villon (A Maria-Ballad by François Villon) Op. 119

== Orchestral works ==
- Abendstimmungen (Evening Moods) for string orchestra and harp (originally for piano four hands) Op. 53
- Symphonic Variations on the Straßburg-Song from the opera Der Kuhreigen Op. 109a (Piano Version: Op. 109b)

== Choral works ==
- 2 Songs Op. 14
- 3 Pieces for Male Choir Op. 17
- 3 Songs for Female Choir Op. 19
- 5 Tanzweisen for Female Choir Op. 21b
- Landsknechtlied (Mercenary's Song) for Male Choir and Orchestra Op. 23
- Zur Trauung (To Marriage) Op. 26
- 3 Songs for Male Choir Op. 36
- 3 Pieces for Male Choir Op. 54
- 5 Songs for Female Choir Op. 58
- 6 Popular Songs Op. 59
- 6 Popular Male Choruses Op. 60
- 5 Songs for Female Voices and Harp or Piano Op. 63
- Wach' auf, mein Volk! (Wake Up, My People!) for Male Choir and Orchestra Op. 64
- Das Volkslied (The Folk-Song) for Male Choir Op. 65
- Fasching (Mardi Gras) for Tenor, Baritone, Bass, Male Choir and Orchestra Op. 67
- 4 Songs for Male Choir Op. 68
- 6 Songs for Male Choir Op. 72
- 8 Songs for Female Choir Op. 76
- 3 Pieces for Male Choir Op. 78
- 2 Geschichtsbilder (Story-Pictures) for Male Choir and Orchestra Op. 79
- Deutsche Ritterlieder (German Knights' Songs) for Male Choir and Orchestra Op. 86
- Das Lied vom Kaiser Arnulf (Emperor Arnulf's Song) for Male Choir and Orchestra Op. 88
- 3 Pieces for Male Choir Op. 89
- Im Schlachtendonner (In the Din of Battle) for Male Choir Op. 92
- Ostara for Male Choir and Orchestra Op. 93
- Deutsch-Österreich (German Austria), national anthem Op. 101 (1918)
- 5 Pieces for Male Choir Op. 103
- Arbeiterlied (Workers' Song) for Male Choir Op. 104
- 4 Songs for Male Choir Op. 105
- 2 Pieces for Male Choir Op. 107
- 5 Songs for Male Choir Op. 112
- Spar-Hymne (Saving Hymn) for Mixed Choir and Orchestra Op. 115
- Chor der Toten (Choir of the Dead) for Mixed Choir and Orchestra Op. 118

== Chamber music ==
- 3 Fantasy-Pieces for Violin and Piano Op. 7
- Piano Trio in F minor Op. 13
- String Quartet No. 1 in B minor Op. 22
- String Quartet No. 2 in C minor Op. 99
- String Quartet No. 3 in E-flat major Op. 113
- Waldstimmungen (Wood Moods) for four horns, Op. 108

== Piano works ==
- Skizzen Op. 3 (Sketches)
- Kahnszene Op. 5 (Boat Scenes)
- Bunte Tänze Op. 10 (Colourful Dances)
- Aus alten Märchen Op. 12 (From Old Fairy Tales)
- Aus meinem Tagebuch Op. 15 (From My Diary)
- 30 Tanzweisen Op. 21 (1881)
- Scherzo in A minor Op. 29
- Kinderliebe und –leben Op. 30 (Children's Love and Life)
- Romantische Blätter Op. 34 (Romantic Leaves/Sheets)
- Tanzbilder Op. 41 (Dance Pictures)
- Daheim! Op. 43 (Home!)
- Dichterreise Op. 46 (Poet's Journey)
- Carneval Op. 51
- Bilder aus dem Volksleben Op. 52 (Pictures from the Folk-Life)
- Neue Klavierstücke Op. 62 (New Piano Pieces)
- O schöne Jugendtage! Op. 80 (O Beautiful Days of Youth)
- 20 Pieces in Barn-Dance Form Op. 95

== Songs ==
- 2 Songs Op. 1
- 4 Songs Op. 2
- 2 Poems (A. Grün) Op. 4
- 9 Songs in "folk-tone" Op. 6
- 8 Love-Songs Op. 8 (1877)
- Liebesfrühling (Spring of Love) — song cycle (Friedrich Rückert) Op. 11
- Süßes Verzichten (Sweet Abandonment) — song cycle Op. 16
- Geliebt-Vergessen (Loved and Forgotten) — song cycle Op. 18
- 3 Album-sheets Op. 24
- 3 Songs Op. 25
- Abschied (Farewell) Op. 27
- Kuriose Geschichte (Curious Stories) Op. 28
- 3 Folk-Songs Op. 31
- 3 Songs Op. 32
- Frühlingslieder (Spring Songs) Op. 33
- 2 Lieder aus Osten (Songs from the East) Op. 35
- 2 Songs each Op. 37, Op. 38, Op. 39, Op. 42
- 4 Songs Op. 44 (1894)
- 4 japanische Lieder (Japanese Songs) Op. 47
- Bonapartes Heimkehr (Bonaparte's Return) Op. 48 (1896)
- Waldmeister (Forest Master)op. 49
- 6 Songs Op. 55
- Verwelkte Rosen (Wilted Roses) Op. 56
- 4 Popular Songs Op. 57
- 4 Songs Op. 61
- Pamphilische Hirtenlieder (Pamphilic Herdsmen's Songs) 3 Songs, Op. 66
- 3 Songs Op. 69a
- Moderne Lyrik (Modern Lyric) Op. 71
- Aus Onkels Liedermappe (From Uncle's Song-Case) Op. 73 (1906)
- Weihnacht (Christmas) Op. 74
- 5 Songs Op. 81
- 5 Songs Op. 82
- Ein Weihnachtslied (A Christmas Song) Op. 83
- 3 Duets Op. 84
- Nachsommerblüten (Late Summer Blossoms) Op. 87
- Das Lied vom Weltkrieg (The Song from the World War) Op. 91
- 7 Songs Op. 94
- Aus des Volkes Wunderhorn (From the Wondrous Horn of the People) Op. 96 (1919)
- An einen Boten, Op. 96
- 7 Songs Op. 106 (1926)
- 6 Lieder vom Glück (Songs of Happiness) Op. 111
- 6 Songs Op. 114 (1930)
- 7 Songs Op. 120
- 3 Songs Op. 121
- 4 Songs Op. 123
