= Der Evangelimann =

- Opera by Wilhelm Kienzl
- Kienzl
- Librettist: Kienzl
- Language: German
- Based on: Leopold Florian Meissner's short story "Aus den Berichten eines Polizeikommissärs
- Premiere: 4 May 1895; Neues Königliches Opernhaus, Berlin

Der Evangelimann (The Evangelist) is an opera in two acts by the Austrian composer Wilhelm Kienzl. The libretto, by the composer, is based on Leopold Florian Meissner's short story "Aus den Berichten eines Polizeikommissärs". It was adapted in 1924 as a silent film The Evangelist.

== Composition history ==
Kienzl composed the opera in a relatively short space of time during 1894 in Graz and in the little Austrian town of Vöcklabruck. When he played extracts from the score to conductor Karl Muck and Count Bolko von Hochberg (then artistic director of the Berlin Opera), they immediately secured the rights to the premiere. The score was published by Bote & Bock Berlin, now part of Boosey & Hawkes.

== Performance history ==
The opera was first performed at the Neues Königliches Opernhaus Berlin on 4 May 1895. It was a triumphant success. Within only a few years most German and Austrian opera houses had the work in their repertory. Famous conductors such as Felix Mottl, Gustav Mahler, Franz Schalk and Richard Strauss gave it their support, and the title role of the Evangelist Mathias was sung by prominent tenors. On 17 January 1927, Kienzl celebrated his 70th birthday by conducting the work at the Vienna State Opera, with Lotte Lehmann and Richard Tauber in the leading roles. The cast also included Hermann Wiedemann, Bella Paalen and Franz Markhoff.

== Roles ==
Roles, voice types, premiere cast
Role	Voice type	Premiere cast, 4 May 1895 Conductor: Karl Muck
Friedrich Engel, magistrate in the monastery of St. Othmar	bass	Josef Mödlinger
Martha, his niece and charge	dramatic soprano	Bertha Pierson
Magdalena, her friend	contralto	Marie Goetze
Johannes Freudhofer, school teacher in St. Othmar	baritone	Paul Bulß
Mathias Freudhofer, his younger brother, clerk in the monastery	dramatic tenor	Eloi Sylva
Xaver Zitterbart, tailor	buffo tenor	Julius Lieban
Anton Schnappauf, gun-smith	buffo bass	Rudolf Krasa
Friedrich Aibler, an older citizen	baritone	Hermann Bachmann
Aibler's wife	mezzo-soprano	
Frau Huber	lyric soprano	
Hans, a farmer's boy	lyric tenor	
Voice of the "skittle boy"	lyric soprano	
Voice of the night-watchman	bass	
Ragwoman	mezzo-soprano	
Boy	soprano	

== Synopsis ==
=== Act 1 ===
Place and time: the Benedictine monastery St. Othmar in Lower Austria, in the year 1820.

Mathias, clerk in the monastery of St. Othmar, is in love with Martha, the foster daughter of the magistrate Friedrich Engel. Mathias's brother Johannes is jealous of Martha's affection and starts an intrigue against him. When the magistrate is informed of what is happening between his charge and Mathias, he dismisses the clerk and expels him from the monastery. Martha resists Johannes's intrusiveness. When Johannes witnesses Martha and Mathias swearing fidelity to each other at their farewell, his jealousy turns into blind hate and he sets the monastery on fire. It is not he, however, but Mathias, who is arrested as the alleged wrongdoer.

=== Act 2 ===
Place and time: Vienna, 1850

Mathias has served a twenty-year sentence and, having been denied re-integration into society, travels the country as an itinerant preacher (this act contains the most popular piece in the opera: "Selig sind, die Verfolgung leiden um der Gerechtigkeit willen", sung by Mathias and a children's chorus). Martha took her life after his imprisonment, Johannes has become rich by dishonest means and lives in Vienna, now a severely ill man. Thirty years after the events at St. Othmar the brothers meet again. Mathias forgives Johannes, who can thus die in peace.

== Recordings ==
- In 1997, EMI Classics re-released a recording made in October 1980 in Munich (Bavarian Radio, Studio 1). Lothar Zagrosek conducted the orchestra and chorus of Bavarian Radio Munich and the Tölzer Knabenchor. The principal roles were sung by Kurt Moll (Friedrich), Helen Donath (Martha), Ortrun Wenkel (Magdalena), Roland Hermann (Johannes) and Siegfried Jerusalem (Mathias).
- In 2006, German label Capriccio released a DVD recording of a 2005 performance at the Vienna Volksoper conducted by Alfred Eschwé.

== Notes ==
Authority control
