= Eloi Sylva =

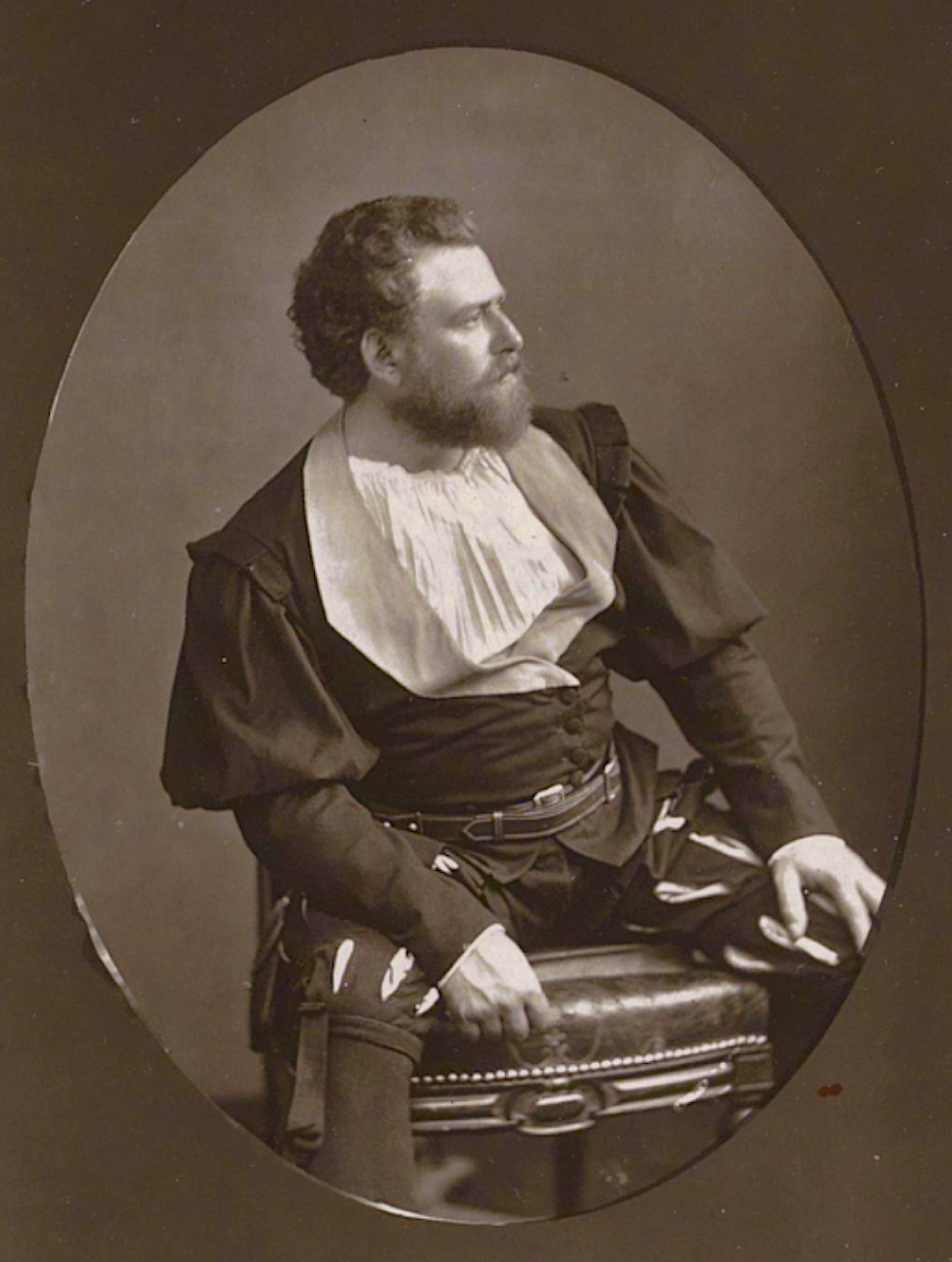
Eloi Sylva

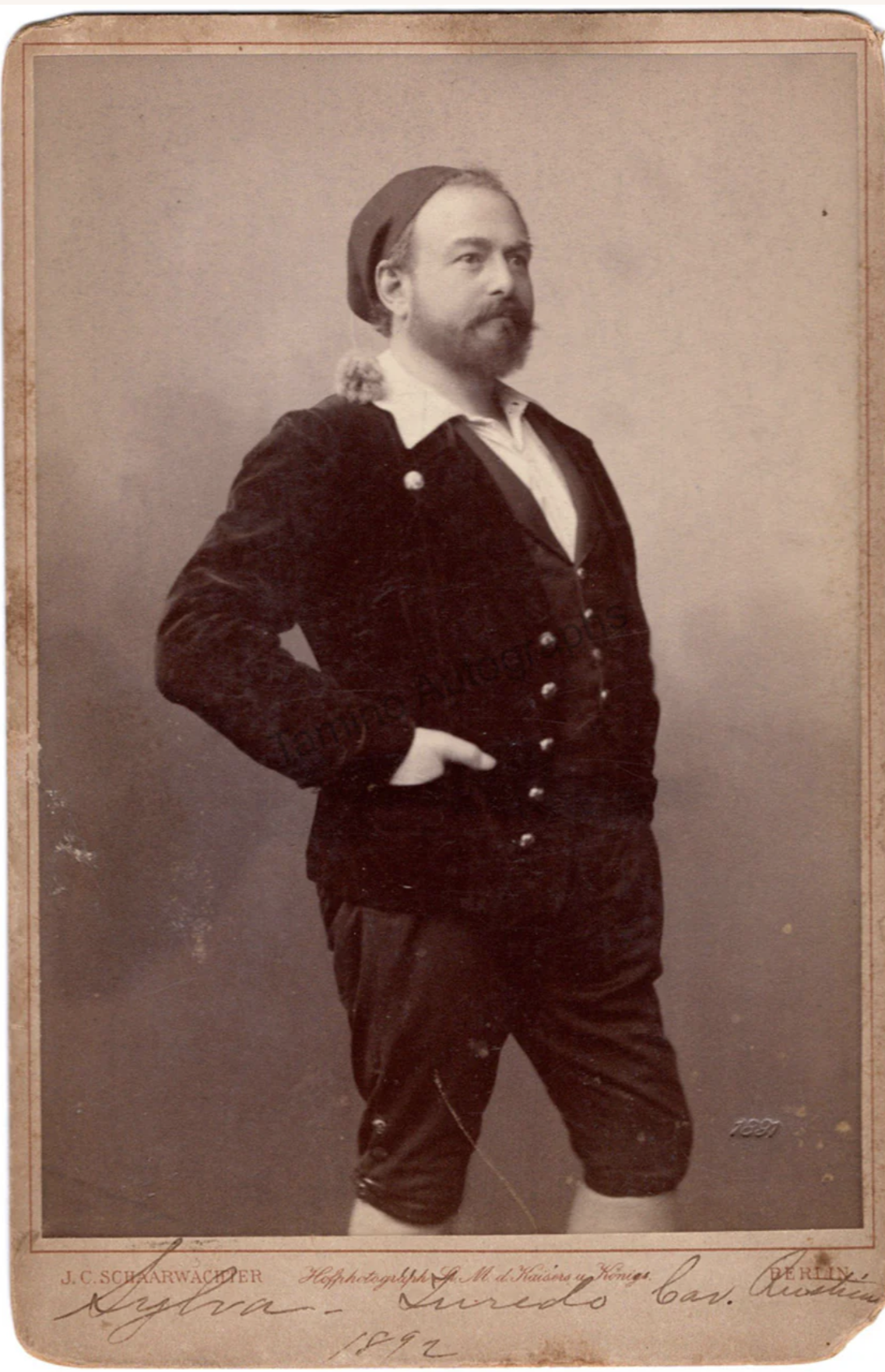
1892 photograph of Eloi Sylva as Turiddu in Cavalleria rusticana.

Eloi Sylva, born Elisius Sylva, (November 29, 1843 – September 7, 1919) was a Belgian tenor who had an active international career from 1868 through 1902.

== Life and career ==
Elisius Sylva was born in Grammont, Belgium (aka Geraardsbergen) on November 29, 1843. His family initially intended him to follow in his father's career as a coppersmith. A rich benefactor intervened, and he was able to receive a music education to train as a tenor at the Brussels Conservatory. He continued his studies in Paris with Gilbert Duprez.

Sylva made his professional opera debut at Théâtre Graslin in Nantes, France in 1868. After this he became a resident artist at La Monnaie in Brussels where he worked until 1872 when he became a member of the Paris Opera. He made his debut in Paris that year in the title role of Giacomo Meyerbeer's Robert le Diable. In 1882 he performed as a guest artist at the Berlin Court Opera in multiple roles; including Robert le Diable, Vasco in Meyerbeer's L'Africaine, and Eleazar in Fromental Halévy's La Juive. This was subsequently followed by appearances at the Bolshoi Theatre and Mariinsky Theatre in Russia, and the Royal Opera House in London.

In 1885 Sylva came to the United States. He made his debut at the Metropolitan Opera ("Met") on November 27, 1885 as Johann von Leiden in Le Prophète. During the 1885-1886 season he subsequently performed with the Met in the title roles of Richard Wagner's Tannhäuser and Rienzi at the Old Met on 39th St. He toured with the Met to Philadelphia's Academy of Music to portray Tannhäuser on December 21, 1885. He toured the United States in the title role of Anton Rubinstein's Néron with the National Opera Company in 1887. On April 9, 1888 he portrayed Tannhäuser for the inauguration of the newly built Grand Opera House in Philadelphia.

Sylva returned to Europe in 1889 after accepting a permanent position with the Berlin Court Opera (BCO). He remained there until his retirement; performing such roles as Canio in Pagliacci, Huon of Bordeaux in Carl Maria von Weber's Oberon, Johann von Leiden, Siegmund in Die Walküre, Turiddu in Cavalleria rusticana, and the title roles in Idomeneo, Rienzi, and Tannhäuser. He starred in the world premiere of Felix Weingartner's Genesius at the BCO in 1892 with Weingartner conducting. The following year he performed in Ferdinand Hummel's opera Mara. He also had a successful career as a concert tenor in Germany. On May 4, 1895 he portrayed Matthias Freudhofer in the first staging of Wilhelm Kienzl's Der Evangelimann. His final appearance on the stage was at the BCO in 1902 as Florestan in Beethoven's Fidelio.

At the end of his life Sylva faced challenges living in Germany during World War I due to his status as a Belgian citizen. He died in Berlin on September 7, 1919.
