= Greta Risley =

American mezzo-soprano opera singer (1866–1923)

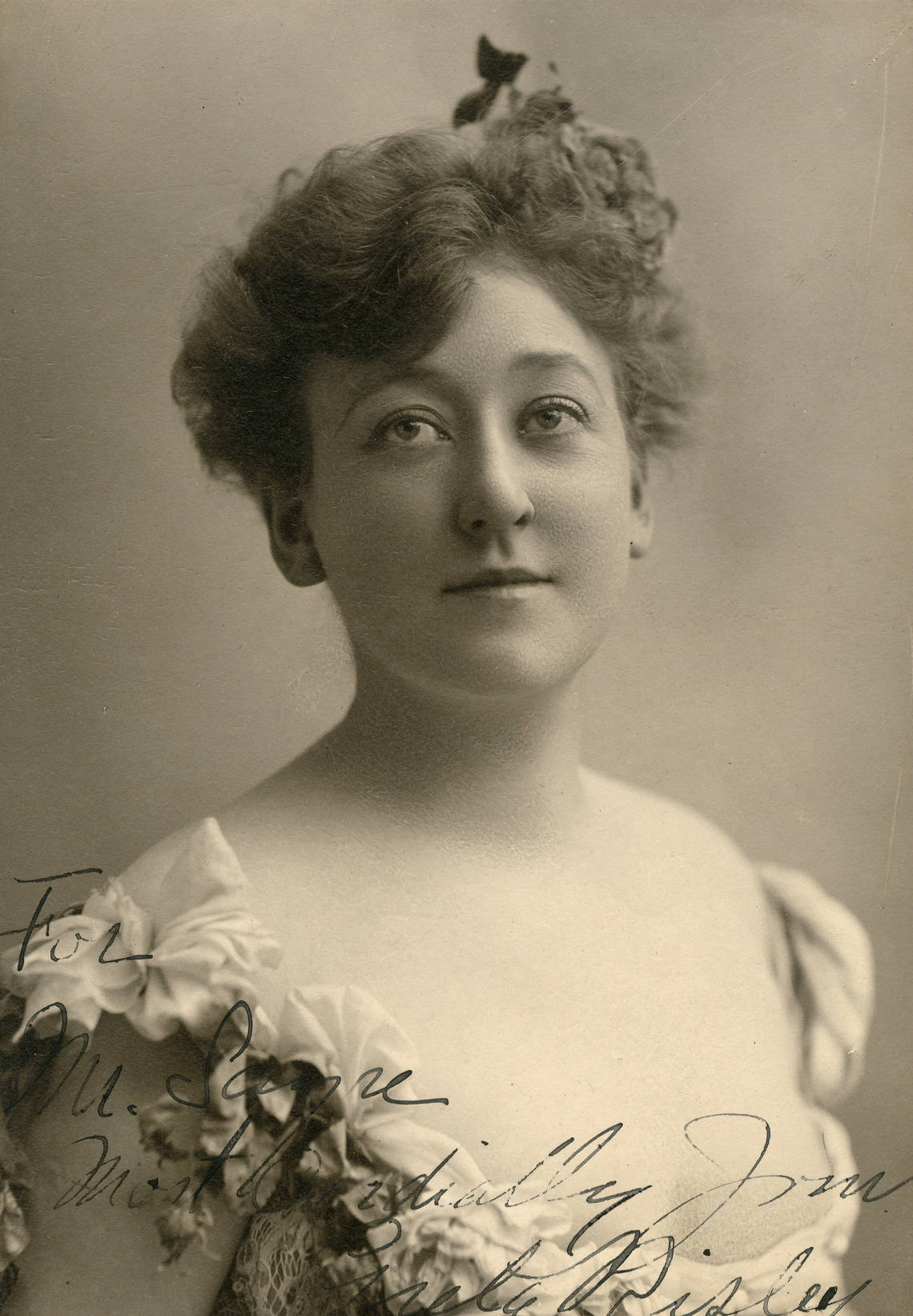
- Greta Risley

Background information
- Born: July 14, 1866; Wilmington, North Carolina
- Died: February 1, 1923 (aged 56) Manhattan, New York City

Greta Risley (born Margaret Percy Beery; July 14, 1866 – February 1, 1923) was a mezzo soprano singer in the United States in the late nineteenth and early twentieth century.

== Biography ==
Risley was born in Wilmington, North Carolina, the second child of father, Stephen Wallace Beery, and mother, Virginia Constance Risley Beery. The family moved to Houston, Texas, before 1870. Her father died in 1872; and two years later her mother married Robert Avery. The Averys lived in Nyack, New York, and moved to Brooklyn in 1882. Greta received her formal music education at the National Conservatory of Music in New York and was a student of Victor Capoul. She adopted her mother's maiden name on the stage. From the beginning of her career, she sang in both grand and comic opera. Her debut was with Gustav Heinrich's New American Opera Company in June 1891 as Marguerite in Faust and then as Jemmy in William Tell, Venus in Tannhäuser, and Inez in Il trovatore at the Grand Opera House in Philadelphia, Pennsylvania.

In October 1891 she joined the Minnie Hauk Opera Company for one season, singing the part of Lola in Cavalleria rusticana and later sang with the Emma Juch Opera Company. Risley made her Metropolitan Opera debut as Mercédès in Carmen on March 4, 1892; she returned to the Metropolitan Opera as Frasquita in Carmen on January 25 and February 3, 1894. Between 1892 and 1894, she again sang with the Heinrich's English/Italian Grand Opera Company and the New American Opera Company, including singing the part of Siebel in Faust, Venus in Tannhäuser, and Inez in Il trovatore. With the Bostonians, she sang Alan-a-Dale in Robin Hood and met her future husband, Louis Casavant, who was also in the Robin Hood cast.

In 1895, she sang with the National Grand Opera under the direction of Gustave Hinrich at the Grand Opera House in Philadelphia. In December and in January 1896, she sang in The Sparrow, a comic opera by Otto Eick. As an indication of her facility in languages, during the week February 17, 1896, she sang in three operas presented by the National Grand Opera in Pittsburgh, Pennsylvania: on Wednesday, singing the part of Jemmy in William Tell (in French); Thursday, Lisa in La Sonnambula (in Italian); and Friday, Siebel in Faust (in French).

On March 19, 1896, Risley married Louis F. Casavant in Washington, D.C., and that same month both of them joined the Frank Daniels Comic Opera Company, appearing in The Wizard of the Nile. Risley sang the part of Simoona, and her husband that of Cheops. They toured with this company for the rest of 1896 and 1897.

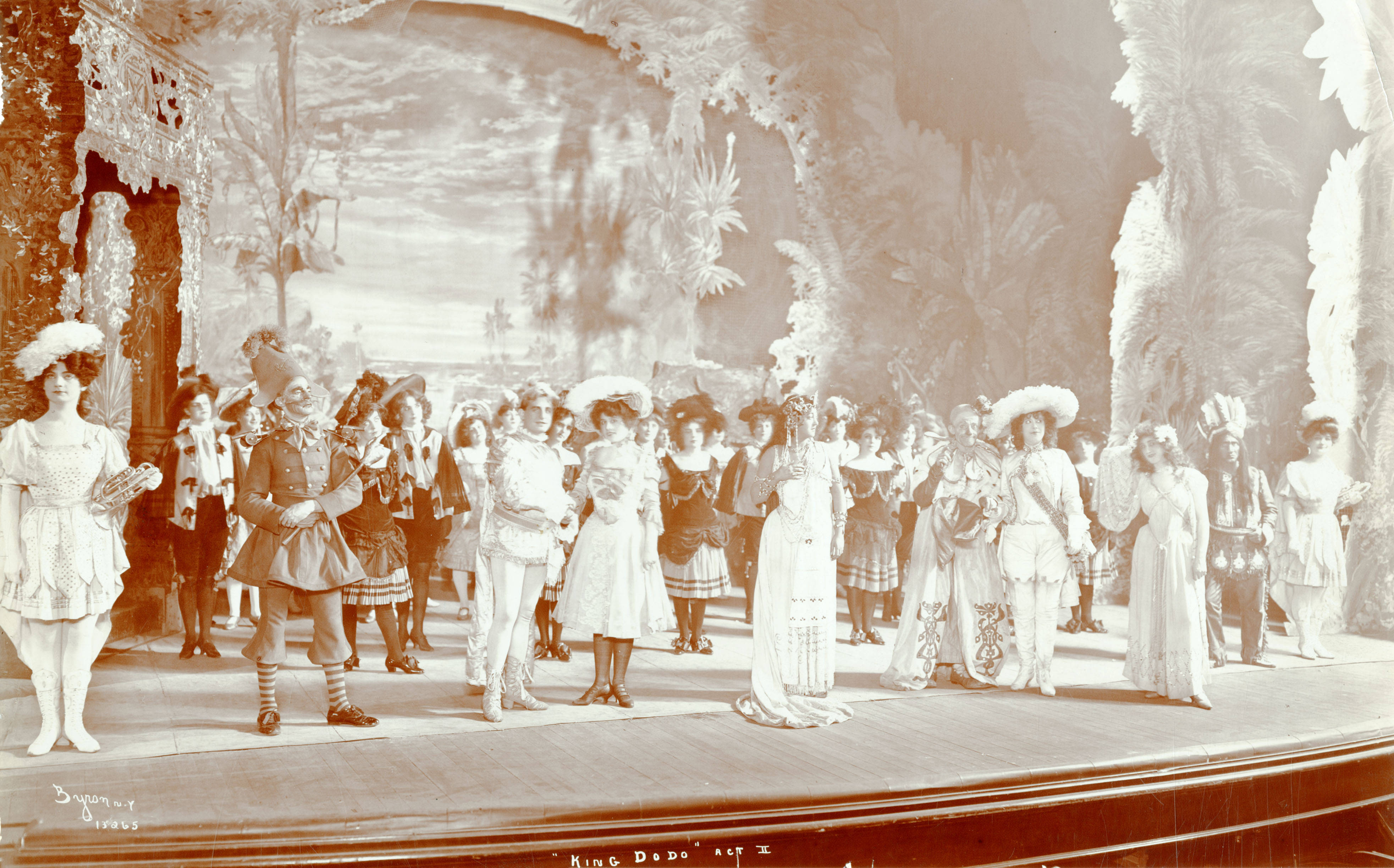
A scene from act 2 of King Dodo with Risley as Queen Lili

Risley next joined the Henry W. Savage's Castle Square Opera Company and toured with them throughout the 1899 and 1900 opera seasons, singing in both grand and comic opera. She sang Amneris in Aida, Ortrud in Fra Diavolo, Galatea in Pygmalion and Galatea, Carmen in Carmen, and Sally Peachum in Sweet Anne Page.

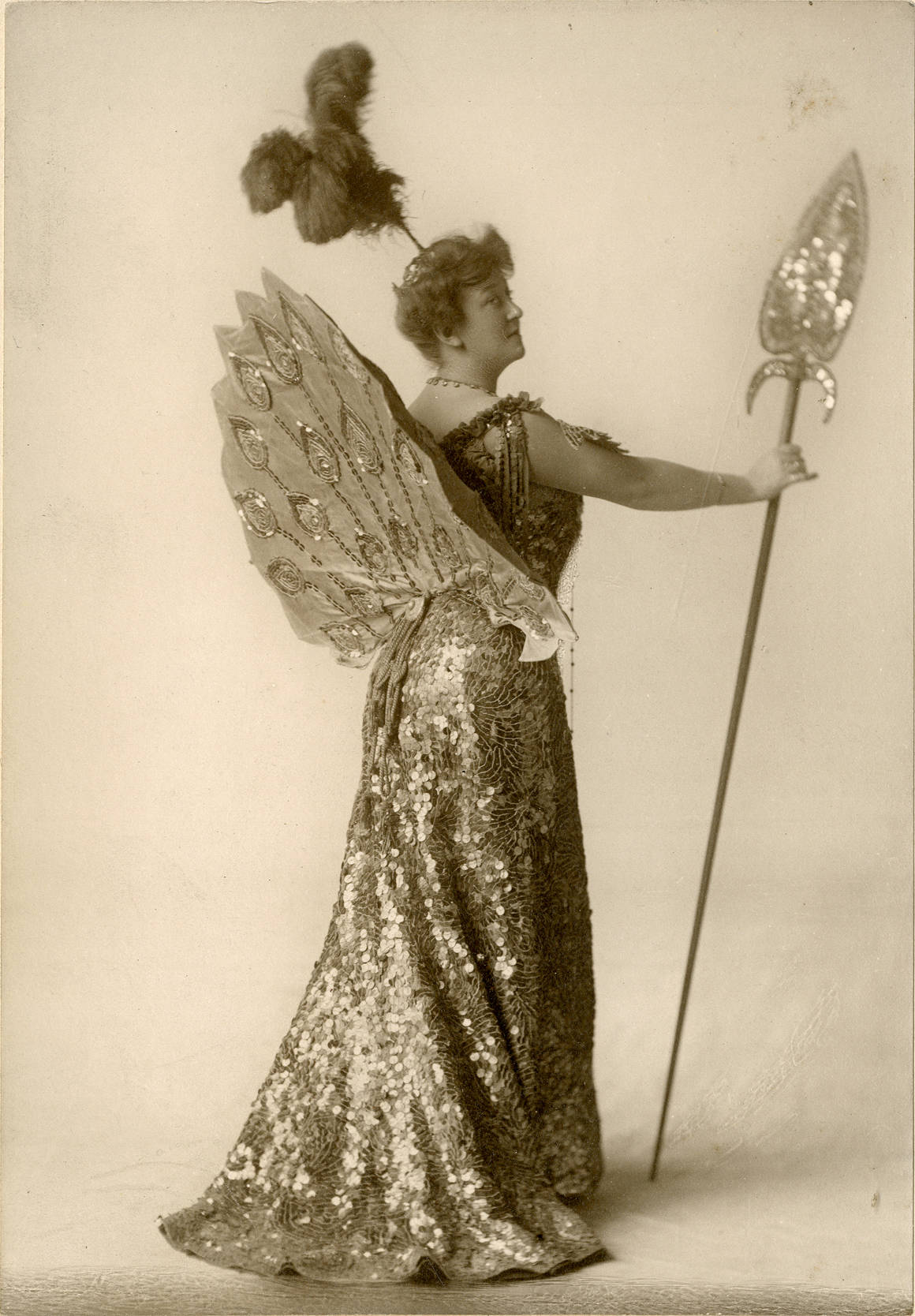
Risley as Lady Peacock

Still under the management of the Castle Square Opera Company, in September 1901, Risley began one of her long-running roles, as Queen Lili in King Dodo. Touring all over the United States, she kept this part until the end of the Spring season in 1903. After the 1903 summer break, the company produced the wildly popular Florodora, with Risley in the part of Dolores. As had long-running King Dodo, Florodora ran that season, and throughout 1904 through the Spring of 1905.

With the close of Florodora the company presented Woodland, with Risley as Lady Peacock. The company toured with this comic opera through the Spring of 1906.

Late in 1906 through the Winter of 1907, Risley sang with the Opera Comique Company in The Rose of the Alhambra. In this opera she sang two roles: Elizabetta and the Spirit of Zorahayda. In May 1907, she sang the part of Katisha in several performances of The Mikado in Baltimore.

In 1908, Risley joined the Aborn English Grand Opera Company, performing first in Fra Diavolo and just a few weeks later in The Wizard of the Nile. She also sang such parts as the Gypsy Queen in The Bohemian Girl, Amneris in Aida, Siebel in Faust, Alan-a-Dale in Robin Hood, Lady Constance in The Geisha, and Nancy in Martha. This company, also known as the Aborn Opera Company or sometimes the Aborn Comic Opera Company, was based in New York City, spent most of its time touring the United States, and took pride in its breadth of opera production, from grand to comic opera. Risley remained with this company through 1911.

Risley's step-father, Bvt. Major-General Robert Avery died in 1912, and for the next year Risley helped care for her mother who was in very poor health. Virginia Risley Avery died on October 27, 1913. For the next several years, Risley performed in some smaller musical concerts, and in 1915, joined the cast of The Chocolate Soldier at the Shubert Theater in New York City.

Beginning in the Spring 1919, through the Winter of 1920, Risley sang with the Commonwealth Opera Association for performances of Gilbert and Sullivan operettas at the Brooklyn Academy of Music, and then went on tour with Fortune Gallo's San Carlo's Opera Company. The company toured across the United States and in Canada. She sang, Katisha in The Mikado, Buttercup in H.M.S. Pinafore, and the Duchess of Plaza Toro in The Gondoliers. She also sang the same roles with the Gallo English Opera Company in its New York City performances. In 1921, Risley again toured with the New Bostonians singing Aurelia in The Chocolate Soldier and Katisha in The Mikado.

== Personal life ==
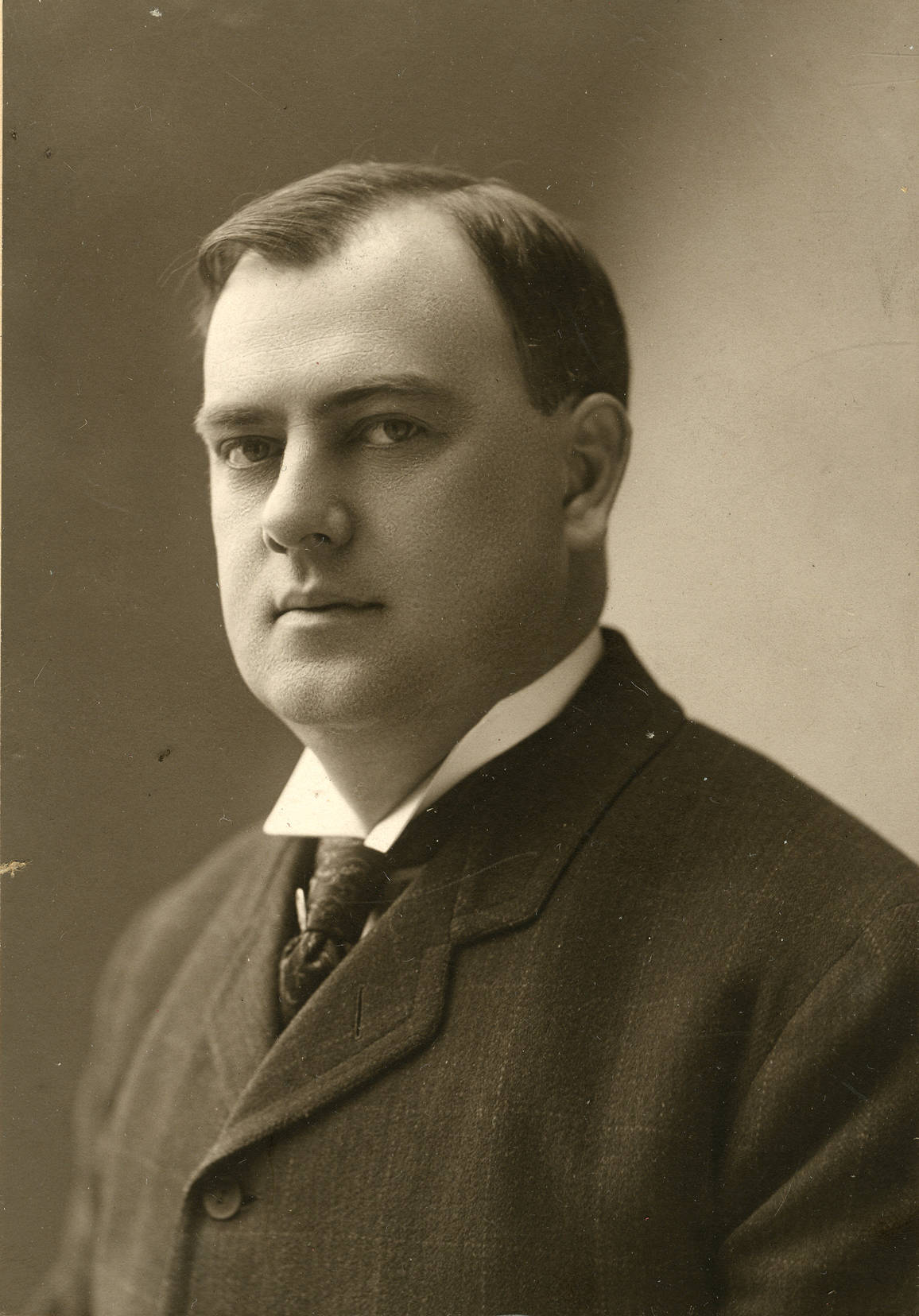
Louis Casavant

Music performance was a constant in Risley's background. Her mother Virginia, and three of Greta's aunts, Cornelia Risley, Eulalia Risley, and Dora Risley, sang together as the Quartet Sisters. Her uncle, Octavius Risley, helped establish the choir at Christ Episcopal Church (now Christ Church Cathedral) in Houston, Texas, and also sang in various comic operas. Her aunt Eulalia Risley was an acclaimed mezzo soprano whose brief operatic career included performances in the United States and Europe.

Greta grew up in a large immediate family. Stephen and Virginia Beery lost their first child, but Greta had a younger brother, Robert; and after Virginia Beery married Robert Avery, they had seven children. Three of those children died in a two-week period in July 1890 and another child, James, died the following year. Greta's stepfather was a prominent attorney, well-known in military and professional circles, affording his family a place in New York society. It was common at the time for women performers to quit the stage when they married, but Greta Risley married an equally talented and popular musician, and Louis Casavant supported his wife's career. They often, though not always, performed in the same comic operas. The couple had no children. The stage was their life, and they regularly performed on holidays, including matinee performances on Thanksgiving Day and Christmas Day.

They travelled extensively during the opera season, but always maintained a New York address – sometimes in Brooklyn, sometimes in Manhattan. Early in their marriage they built a summer home, known as Hilltop Cottage, in the Oklahoma area of Martha's Vineyard, and that is where they spent Summers. Their home was near the Innisfail Hotel, a popular off-season retreat for theater performers. Risley was an avid sailor and also enjoyed long walks and golf. Risley was an active member of the Martha's Vineyard Sea Coast Defense Chapter of the Daughters of the American Revolution.

Risley died on February 1, 1923, at her home in Manhattan, of complications from breast cancer. She is buried at Vineyard Haven, Massachusetts.
