= The Evangelist (1924 film) =

1924 film

- Directed by: Holger-Madsen
- Written by: Holger-Madsen; Hermann Kienzl; Wilhelm Kienzl (opera)
- Produced by: Erich Pommer
- Starring: Paul Hartmann; Hanni Weisse; Elisabeth Bergner
- Cinematography: Frederik Fuglsang
- Production company: Union-Film
- Distributed by: UFA
- Release date: 4 January 1924
- Country: Germany
- Languages: Silent; German intertitles

The Evangelist (German: Der Evangelimann) is a 1924 German silent drama film directed by Holger-Madsen and starring Paul Hartmann, Hanni Weisse and Elisabeth Bergner. It is based on the 1895 opera Der Evangelimann by Wilhelm Kienzl.

The film's sets were designed by the art director Botho Hoefer. It was released by the German major studio UFA.

== Cast ==
- Paul Hartmann as Evangelimann, Lehrer einer Klosterschule
- Hanni Weisse as Mutter / Tochter
- Jacob Feldhammer as Bruder des Evangelimanns
- Heinrich Peer as Engel, Justitiar des Stiftes St. Othmar
- Elisabeth Bergner as Magdalena
- Hans Leiter as Der Giraffe
- Holger-Madsen as Schneider Zitterbart
- Dr. Jockl as Die Bulldogge
- Harry Halm as Bettelbub
- Adolphe Engers
- Loni Nest
- Sigrid Onegin

== Bibliography ==
- Grange, William. Cultural Chronicle of the Weimar Republic. Scarecrow Press, 2008.
