= Das Testament =

Das Testament may refer to:

- Das Testament (opera), by Kienzl 1916
- Das Testament (E Nomine album)
- The Testament of Dr. Mabuse, film Das Testament des Dr. Mabuse by Fritz Lang 1933
