= Ferdinand Möhring =

German composer

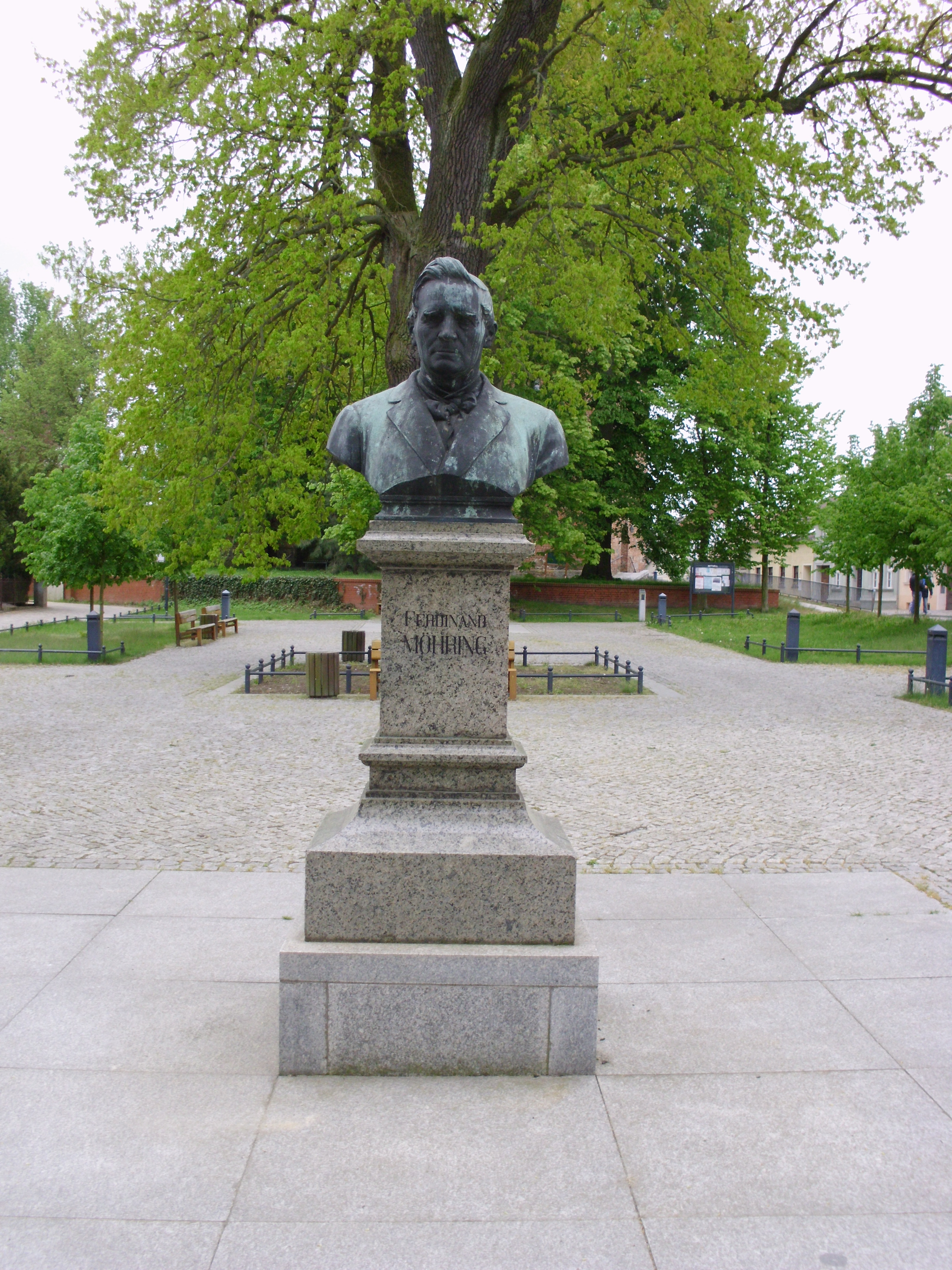
Ferdinand Möhring monument in Alt Ruppin

Ferdinand Möhring (18 January 1816 – 1 May 1887) was a German composer, poet, conductor and organist.

== Personal life ==
Möhring was born in Alt Ruppin as the son of the master carpenter Johann Friedrich Möhring and spent his childhood and youth in Neuruppin, where he attended the Gymnasium. In 1857 he married Hedwig Schulz, the daughter of a painter. and from 1873 he lived as a freelance artist. Möhring died in 1887 in Wiesbaden at the age of 71, where he found his final resting place at the Nordfriedhof.

== Career in music ==
In 1830, he entered the trade school in Berlin, where he completed a Baumeister apprenticeship at his father's express wish. He broke off this apprenticeship and joined the Royal Music Institute of Berlin. His first motet was performed in 1835. His striving for an all-round musical education led him to join the music department of the Academy of Arts, where he studied from 1837 to 1840. There, he mainly composed instrumental music, including his Symphony in B flat major, which was premiered by Felix Mendelssohn Bartholdy in the Gewandhaus in 1838. On 26 January 1840, he gave his final concert together with a fellow student in the hall of the Berlin Singakademie. He then moved to Saarbrücken, where he was appointed director of the male choral society and organist at the Ludwigskirche.

In 1842, he travelled to Paris, where he met Frédéric Chopin. In 1844 he was appointed royal music director and in 1845 he was appointed organist at the parish church of St Mary and music teacher at the grammar school in Neuruppin. From 1845 to 1874, he was music director of the male choral society Altruppin, which since 1904 bears the name of its long-time leader. From 1873 he lived as a freelance artist. In 1876, he moved to Wiesbaden, where he made friends with the artists Gustav Freytag, Franz Abt, and Friedrich von Bodenstedt.

== Work ==
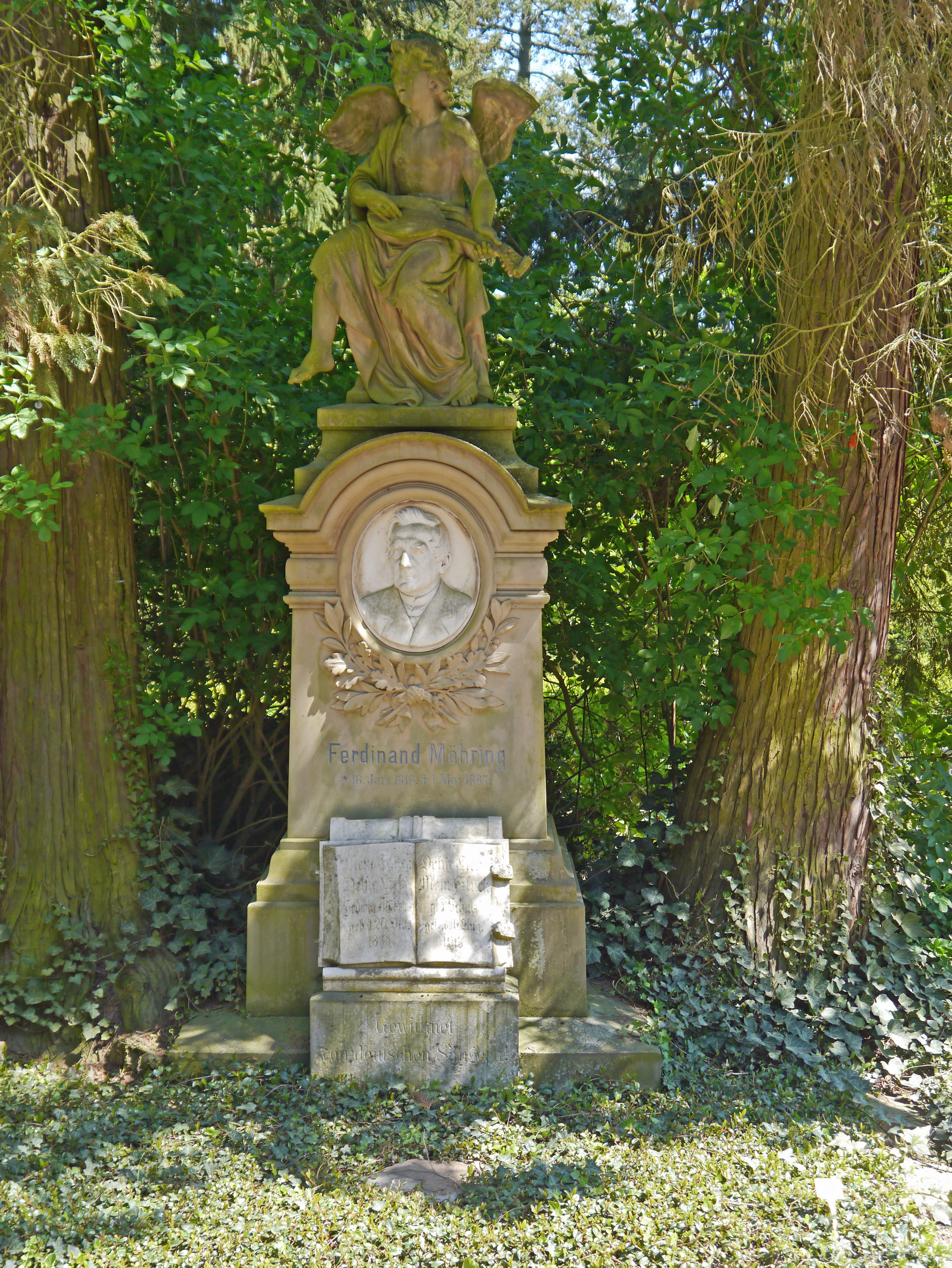
Tomb at the northern cemetery in Wiesbaden

- Motets
- Sinfonie B-Dur
- Lieder wie Elslein von Kaub
- Drei Psalmen für Soli und Chor: op. 32. No. 2: Psalm 137 „An den Wassern zu Babel“
- Herr, herr, wir danken dir

== Honours ==
The music teacher and composer Möhring is commemorated by a monument by Max Wiese in his birthplace, Alt Ruppin. It was unveiled in 1897.

== Student ==
- Paul Bulß
