= George Plowman (architect) =

George W. Plowman (28 December 1832 – 7 July 1903) was an American architect. He is best known for designing and building multiple theaters in Philadelphia, Pennsylvania.

== Life and career ==
The son of Cornelius and Elizabeth Plowman, George Plowman was born in Ulster, Pennsylvania in 1832. His brother was the theatrical impresario Thomas M. Plowman. In 1857 he established a business in Philadelphia as a builder. He built many buildings of varying kinds in South Philadelphia, but became chiefly known for building theaters; among them the Center Theatre, the People's Theatre, and the Grand Opera House. In 1896 he created the plan for the redesign of the Trocadero Theatre.

He worked closely with Philadelphia theatre magnate George K. Goodwin. He also was involved with theaters in Washington D.C. that were attached to his brother's enterprise.

Plowman died in Philadelphia on 7 July 1903.
