= Paul Bulß =

German baritone (1847–1902)

- Born: 19 December 1847; Birkholz estate, Prignitz, Brandenburg, Prussia
- Died: 19 March 1902 (aged 54); Temesvar, Austria-Hungary
- Occupation: Operatic baritone
- Organizations: Dresden Court Theatre; Berlin Court Theatre
- Title: Kammersänger

Paul Bulß (19 December 1847 – 19 March 1902) was a German baritone, mostly in opera but also in concert and recital, who appeared at leading court opera houses including Dresden, Berlin and Vienna. He appeared in title roles such as Mozart's Don Giovanni, Marschner's Hans Heiling, Rossini's Barber and Wagner's Holländer. He created roles in several world premieres, such as in Kienzl's Der Evangelimann and Don Quixote.

== Life ==
Born in the Birkholz estate, Prignitz district in Brandenburg, Bulß, son of the manor's owner, was discovered by his singing teacher Ferdinand Möhring at the Neuruppin grammar school. He studied voice with Eduard Mantius in Vienna, Gustav Engel in Berlin and Emil Goetze in Leipzig.

He made his debut as the Tsar in Lortzing's Zar und Zimmermann at the municipal theatre in Lübeck in 1868. He worked at the Cologne Opera from 1869, and at the Court Theatre in Kassel from 1870, where he remained until 1876. From Kassel, he made his first concert debut at the Leipzig Gewandhaus, and it was so successful that he became a member of the ensemble in 1876. He appeared there on 1 August 1876 in the title role of Wagner's Der fliegende Holländer. He won the favour of the audience, and the recognition of King Albert of Saxony, who appointed him Royal Kammersänger after only three years of service.

Bulß was a member of the court theatre in Berlin from 1889 until his retirement in 1901. He appeared there as Tonio in the first production at the house of Leoncavallo's Der Bajazzo in 1882. He created the role of Johannes Freudhofer in Wilhelm Kienzl's Der Evangelimann in 1895, and the title of Kienzl's Don Quixote in 1898. At the Vienna State Opera, he appeared as Escamillo in Bizet's Carmen, Wolfram in Tannhäuser, Luna in Verdi's Il trovatore, and in the title roles of Zar und Zimmermann and Wagner's Der fliegende Holländer. Bulß performed title roles such as Mozart's Don Giovanni, Marschner's Hans Heiling, Rossini's The Barber of Seville, and roles such as Wolfram in Wagner's Tannhäuser, the Prince in Das Nachtlager in Granada and Renato in Verdi's Un ballo in maschera.

Bulß was also a concert singer and especially lieder recitalist. He took part in the 1893 world premiere of Mahler's Des Knaben Wunderhorn in Hamburg. Guest performances took him to Austria, Holland, Switzerland, Russia, Denmark, Sweden and Norway. On a concert tour through Hungary, he died in Temesvar of the consequences of pneumonia, which he had contracted during the journey due to a cold.

=== Family ===
Bulß was married to Olga Eva Dirut (1852–1906). The educator and social politician Helene Glaue (1876–1967) was their daughter.
