= Don Quixote (opera) =

Opera in three acts by Wilhelm Kienzl

- Opera by Wilhelm Kienzl
- Kienzl
- Librettist: Kienzl
- Language: German
- Based on: Don Quixote
- Premiere: 18 November 1898; Neues Königliches Opernhaus, Berlin

Don Quixote, Op. 50 is an opera in three acts by Wilhelm Kienzl. The libretto, written by the composer, is based on the novel by Miguel de Cervantes.

== Composition history ==
Kienzl composed the opera in 1896, completing the full score on 9 October 1897, the 350th birthday of Cervantes (according to the composer's note in the score Cervantes was born on 9 October 1547). He dedicated the opera to "den Manen des grossen Cervantes" ("the Manes of the great Cervantes"). The score was published by Musikverlages Bote & G. Bock Berlin GmbH, now part of Boosey & Hawkes.

== Performance history ==
The opera was first performed at the Neues Königliches Opernhaus (Königliche Hofoper) in Berlin on 18 November 1898 with Carl Muck conducting. It was not favourably received by the audience, nor by the Berlin press, and only four more performances followed. The fifth performance was (and still remains) the last fully staged one of the complete unabbreviated work, which takes over three hours (without intermission). Kienzl abbreviated the work for a performance the same year at the Neues Deutsches Theater in Prague; again the reception was divided. Although a production run in Graz in 1905 met with greater success, the opera was not staged again for almost thirty years. A new abbreviated version was premiered in Graz on 1 May 1934, and then at the Vienna State Opera on 22 November 1936.

The only production in a non-German speaking country was in Moscow in 1911.

The opera was revived in a concert performance conducted by Gustav Kuhn at the Konzerthaus Berlin on 22 March 1998. (see also section Recordings)

== Roles ==
Role	Voice type	Premiere Cast 18 November 1898 (Conductor: Carl Muck)
Alonzo Quixano, an elderly squire, named "Don Quixote de la Mancha"	character baritone	Hermann Bachmann
Mercedes, his niece	mezzo-soprano	
Sancho Pansa, a peasant	buffo tenor	Julius Lieban
The duke	lyric tenor	Robert Philipp
The duchess	high soprano	Therese Rothauser
Don Clavijo, the duke's chamberlain	bass	Rudolf Krasa
Carrasco, barber	lyric baritone	Paul Bulß
Tirante, innkeeper	buffo bass	Emil Stammer
Maritornes, his daughter, a waitress	soprano	Emilie Herzog
Aldonza, a waitress	contralto	
A messenger	bass	
Kitchen boy	soprano	
Frasquita, Rosita, Marieta, Juanita, the duchess's maids	soprano & contralto	Marie Dietrich, Thessa Gradl

== Instrumentation ==
The orchestral score requires:

- 3 flutes (flute 3 doubling piccolo), 2 oboes (oboe 2 doubling English horn), 2 clarinets, bass clarinet, 2 bassoons, contrabassoon;
- 4 horns, 3 trumpets, 3 trombones, tuba;
- timpani, percussion, 2 harps;
- strings (violins I, violins II, violas, violoncellos, double basses).

== Recordings ==
In 2002 CPO released a recording made during rehearsals and concert performance (19–22 March 1998) of the revival in Berlin with Gustav Kuhn conducting the Rundfunk-Sinfonieorchester Berlin. The principal roles were sung by Thomas Mohr (Don Quixote), Michelle Breedt (Mercedes) and James Wagner (Sancho Pansa).
