= Das Testament (opera) =

1916 opera by Wilhelm Kienzl

- Opera by Wilhelm Kienzl
- Kienzl
- Librettist: Kienzl
- Language: German
- Based on: themes by Peter Rosegger
- Premiere: 6 December 1916; Vienna Volksoper

Das Testament, Op. 90, is a musical comedy by Wilhelm Kienzl to his own libretto, based on motives by Peter Rosegger. It was first performed on 6 December 1916 at the Vienna Volksoper. While successful at the time, the opera was last performed in 1927 until the Linz State Theatre mounted a new production in 2007 on the occasion of the composer's 150th birthday. The performance by the Bruckner Orchestra Linz conducted by Ingo Ingensand was recorded on two CDs by the Linz Theatre.

The opera is set in 1750 in the Austrian region of Ausseerland, Salzkammergut. The old and unmarried mayor and innkeeper of Fopphausen is well liked in the village because he promised his assets to his friends. He is persuaded to test his popularity by disinheriting everybody, fake his death, and observe the reaction of the villagers from a hide out. The plot's similarities to Puccini's Gianni Schicchi, which premiered two years later, irritated Kienzl.
