= An einen Boten =

German folksong

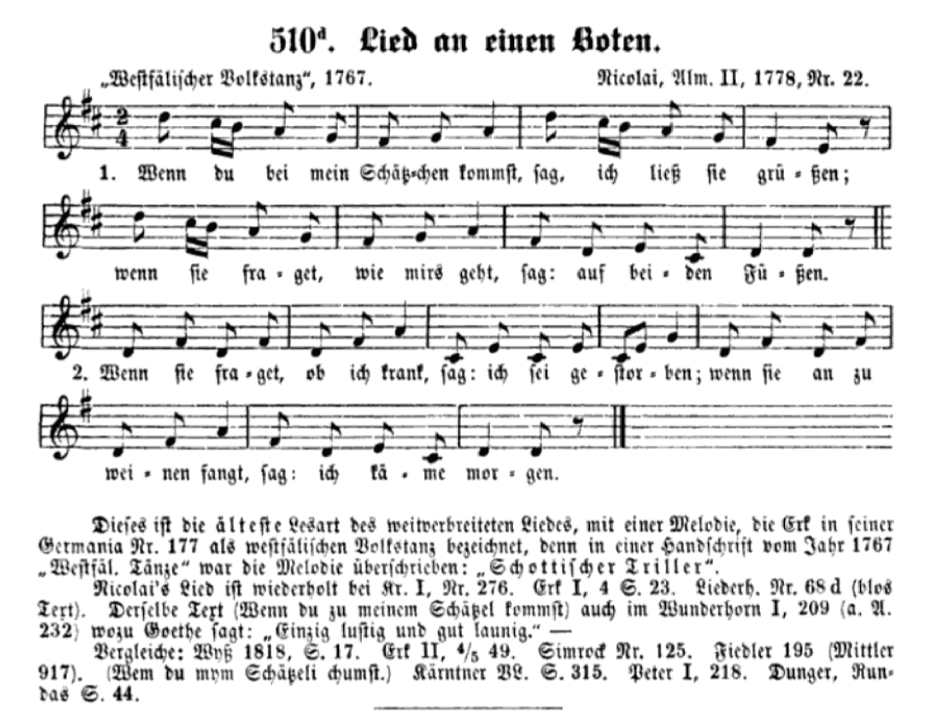
- Text and melody from Deutscher Liederhort (1893)

Song
- Language: German
- English title: To a Messenger
- Published: not later than 1778
- Genre: Folk
- Songwriter: Traditional
- Melody in a MIDI rendering

"An einen Boten" (German for "To a messenger") is a short German folk song.

C. F. Nicolai published the lyrics in 1778 in his Ein feyner kleyner Almanach (German: A Fine Little Almanac). Almost unchanged, it was included by C. Brentano and A. von Arnim in their collection of German folk songs, Des Knaben Wunderhorn (1806). Goethe called the verses "uniquely comical and good-natured" (einzig lustig und gutlaunig).

Some composers have written tunes for the song. A few English translations have been published as well.

== Words ==
Wenn du zu mei'm Schätzel kommst,
Sag: ich ließ' sie grüßen;
Wenn sie fraget: wie mir's geht?
Sag: auf beiden Füßen.

Wenn sie fraget, ob ich krank?
Sag: ich sei gestorben;
Wenn sie an zu weinen fangt,
Sag: ich käme morgen.

If you come to my darling,
Say: I send her greetings;
If she asks how it's going with me,
Say: On both feet.

If she asks whether I am sick,
Say: I have died.
If she begins to weep,
Say: I will come tomorrow.

== Melody ==
Source
