= Grand Opera House (Philadelphia) =

Theatre in Pennsylvania, US

Coordinates: 39°58′48″N 75°9′28″W

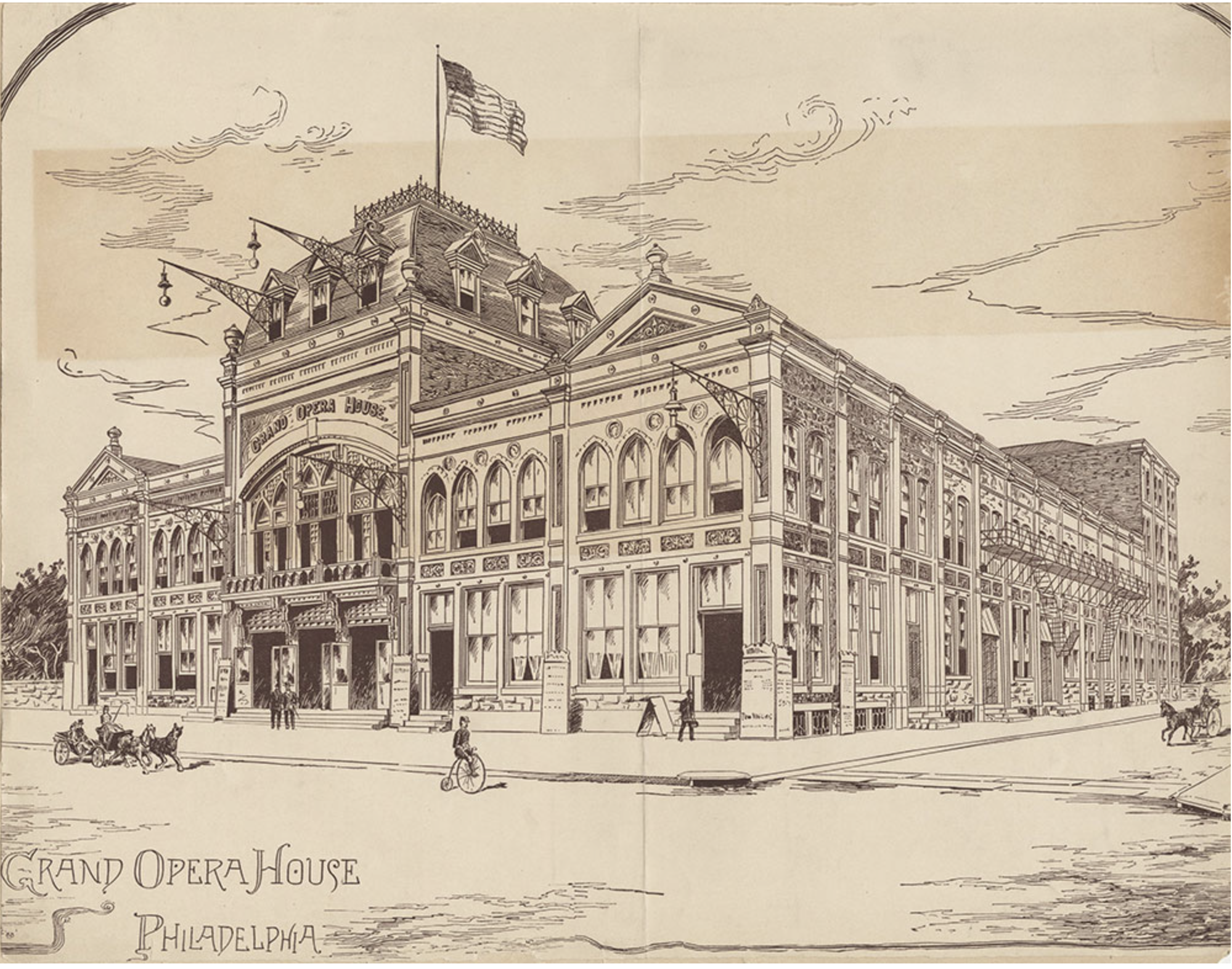
Sketch of the Grand Opera House in Philadelphia

Grand Opera House was a theatre in Philadelphia, Pennsylvania, United States, located at the corner of Broad Street and Montgomery Avenue. It operated as both a legitimate theatre and a venue for vaudeville. In 1912 it was re-named Nixon's Grand Opera House after being acquired by theatre magnate Fred G. Nixon-Nirdlinger. At that point the theatre operated primarily as a venue for vaudeville. While still officially Nixon's Grand Opera House, it was often referred to as Nixon's Grand or Nixon's Grand Theatre in the 1920s. In 1930 its name was officially changed to Nixon's Grand Theatre when it was converted into a cinema leased to Fox Films. It operated as a movie theatre until 1940 when the theatre was mostly demolished.

== History ==
Irvin R. Glazer stated in his 1994 book on Philadelphia theatres that the Grand Opera House (GOH) was the fourth largest theatre ever built in the city of Philadelphia and that it had a seating capacity of up to 4,000 people. Designed by architect George Plowman, it was built for its first owner, the Betz Brewing Company, in part as a home for Gustav Hinrichs's National Opera Company (NOC).

The GOH was officially opened on April 9, 1888, including a dedication speech given by Charles Emory Smith. The performance that night by the NOC was a production of Richard Wagner's Tannhäuser. The cast was led by tenor Eloi Sylva in the title role. Other cast members included Bertha Pierson as Elizabeth of Hungary, Frank Vetta as Hermann, Amanda Fabris as Venus, William Ludwig as Wolfram von Eschenbach, Charles Bassett as Walther von der Vogelweide, Joseph Pache as Heinrich der Schreiber, Alenzo Stoddard as Biterolf, George H. Broderick as Reinmar, and Attalie Claire as the Shepherd Boy.

The NOC was in residence at the GOH for annual summer seasons of opera from 1888 through 1896. During that time the company staged the first United States productions of several well known operas, including Cavalleria rusticana (September 9, 1891), L'amico Fritz (June 8, 1892, Les pêcheurs de perles (August 25, 1893), and Manon Lescaut (August 29, 1894). This production of Manon Lescaut was the first United States staging of an opera by Giacomo Puccini. On July 28, 1890, the NOC performed the world premiere of Hinrichs's opera Onti-Ora at the GOH.

In April 1912 theatre magnate Fred G. Nixon-Nirdlinger and his partner Thomas M. Love signed a ten-year lease of the GOH, taking over from Stair & Hamlin. It was announced the following September that the theatre would undergo renovations and that its name would at a future date by modified to include the Nixon name. Thomas W. Lamb was hired to significantly remodel the theatre in 1913. It re-opened as Nixon's Grand Opera House (NGOH) on September 1, 1913, with Christie MacDonald as the featured performer.

Under Nixon, the NGOH operated simultaneously as both a vaudeville and film venue and was often referred to as Nixon's Grand or Nixon's Grand Theatre. Another significant remodel was undertaken by Hoffman-Henon in 1923. Some of the entertainers who performed at the theatre included Ethel Barrymore, Irene Rich, Lillian Russell, Sophie Tucker, and Eva Tanguay. In 1930 the NGOH was leased by the Fox Film Corporation, who converted the theatre into a cinema. It continued to operate as a movie theatre until 1940 when its structure was largely demolished, although its facade was left intact. The property was converted into a parking lot.
