= Hermann Bachmann =

German baritone

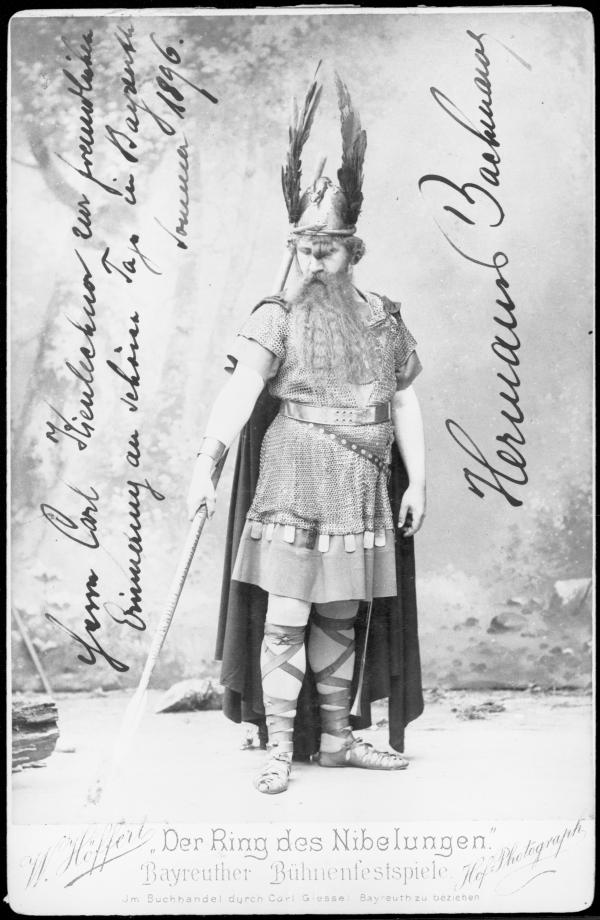
Hermann Bachmann (Note: The inscription on the photograph mentions Bayreuth, and the costume and the spear suggest that it shows Bachmann in the role of Wotan in Richard Wagner's Der Ring des Nibelungen.)

Carl Hermann Bachmann (7 October 1864 – 5 July 1937) was a German operatic baritone, opera director and singing teacher.

== Life ==
Born in Cottbus, Bachmann, who initially became a merchant, took singing lessons with Gustav Schmidt in Berlin. He made his debut as a singer in 1890 at the Stadttheater in Halle an der Saale, where he remained until 1894. From 1894 to 1897, he worked at the Nuremberg City Theatre. From 1897 to 1918, he joined the Berlin Court Opera, where he also worked as a director from 1910. Later he worked as a singing teacher.

Bachmann died in Berlin at the age of 72.
