= Julius Lieban =

Austro-German operatic tenor (1857–1940)

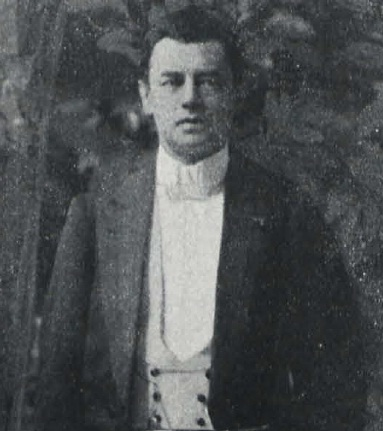
Julius Lieban, 1902.

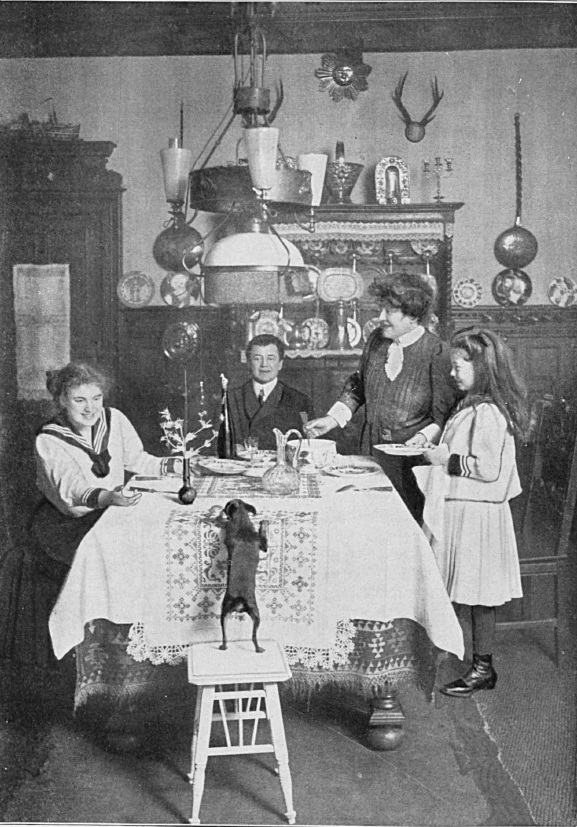
Julius Lieban with his family, 1908. Photo by R. Siegert.

Julius Lieban (19 February 1857 – 1 February 1940) was an Austro-German operatic tenor.

== Life ==
Lieban was born as the son of a hazzan in Břeclav and learned to play the violin from Roma in his youth. Later he attended the conservatory of the Gesellschaft der Musikfreunde, studied singing with Josef Gänsbacher and came to the local theatre as a violinist. Afterwards he sang at the Stadttheater in Leipzig and at the Komische Oper in Vienna as opera buffa. In 1881 he took part in the Wagner tour of Angelo Neumann and later sang at the Bayreuth Festival. From 1883 he was member of the Staatsoper Unter den Linden as tenorbuffo; later he also sang at the newly founded Deutsche Oper Berlin in Charlottenburg. In 1908 Lieban was appointed Kammersänger. Still in 1933 he sang the Mime at the State Opera at the age of 70. He was successfully engaged for guest performances at many great opera stages all over Europe. His last engagements in Berlin were as a singing teacher. He was married to the soprano Helene Lieban-Globig (31 March 1866 in Berlin – 1919 in Stettin?).

His brothers were the baritone Adalbert Lieban, the bass Adolf Lieban and the baritone Siegmund Lieban.

Lieban died in Berlin at the age of 82. His grave is located in the Südwestkirchhof Stahnsdorf where he rests next to his brother Adalbert.

== Student ==
- Albert Reiss
