= Wilhelm Kienzl =

Austrian composer (1857–1941)

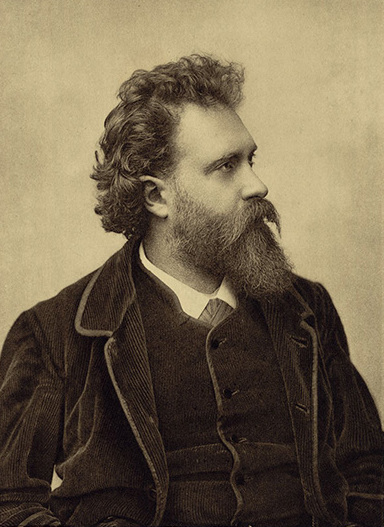
Wilhelm Kienzl. Photo by Friedrich Bruckmann

Wilhelm Kienzl (17 January 1857 – 3 October 1941) was an Austrian composer.

== Early life and education ==
Kienzl was born in the small, picturesque Upper Austrian town of Waizenkirchen. His family moved to the Styrian capital of Graz in 1860, where he studied the violin under Ignaz Uhl, piano under Johann Buwa, and composition from 1872 under the Chopin scholar Henri-Louis-Stanislas Mortier de Fontaine. From 1874, he studied composition under Wilhelm Mayer (also known as W.A. Rémy), music aesthetics under Eduard Hanslick and music history under Friedrich von Hausegger. He was subsequently sent to the music conservatorium at Prague University to study under Josef Krejčí, the director of the conservatorium. After that he went to Leipzig Conservatory in 1877, then to Weimar to study under Liszt, before completing doctoral studies at the University of Vienna.

== Career ==
While Kienzl was at Prague, Krejčí took him to the Bayreuth Festival to hear the first performance of Wagner's Ring Cycle. It made a lasting impression on Kienzl, so much so that he founded the "Graz Richard Wagner Association" (now the "Austrian Richard Wagner Company, Graz Office") with Hausegger and with Friedrich Hofmann. Although he subsequently fell out with "The Wagnerites", he never lost his love for Wagner's music.

In 1879, Kienzl departed on a tour of Europe as a pianist and conductor. He became the director of the Deutsche Oper in Amsterdam during 1883, but he soon returned to Graz, where in 1886, he took over the leadership of the Steiermärkischen Musikvereins und Aufgaben am Konservatorium. He was engaged by the manager Bernhard Pollini as Kapellmeister at the Hamburg Stadttheater for the 1890–91 season, but was dismissed in mid-January 1891 because of the hostile reviews he received (his successor was Gustav Mahler). Later he conducted in Munich.

In 1894, he wrote his third and most famous opera, Der Evangelimann, but was unable to match its success with Don Quixote (1897). Only Der Kuhreigen (1911) reached a similar level of popularity, and that very briefly. In 1917, Kienzl moved to Vienna, where his first wife, the Wagnerian soprano Lili Hoke, died in 1919, and he married Henny Bauer, the librettist of his three most recent operas, in 1921.

After World War I, he composed the melody to a poem written by Karl Renner, Deutschösterreich, du herrliches Land (German Austria, you wonderful country), which became the unofficial national anthem of the first Austrian Republic until 1929. Aware of changes in the dynamics of modern music, he ceased to write large works after 1926, and abandoned composition altogether in 1936 due to bad health. As of 1933, Kienzl openly supported Hitler’s regime in Germany. However, during the Nazi era there were calls for boycotting his music due to his part Jewish ancestry In 1936 he was placed in the black list of the RS Berlin.

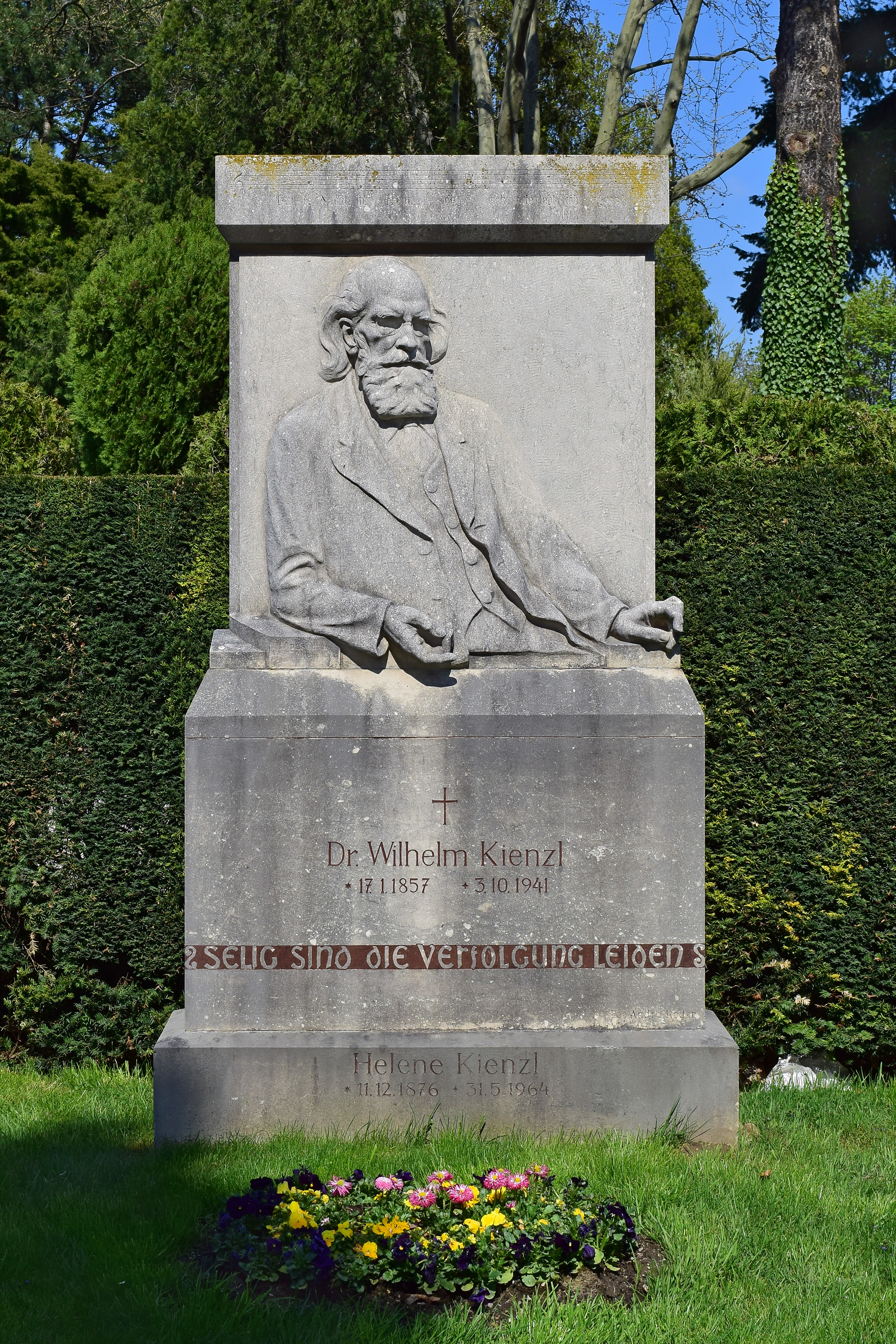
Grave of Wilhelm Kienzl at the Vienna Central Cemetery

Kienzl's first love was opera, then vocal music, and it was in these two genres that he made his name. For a while he was considered, along with Hugo Wolf, one of the finest composers of Lieder (art songs) since Schubert. His most famous work, Der Evangelimann, best known for its aria Selig sind, die Verfolgung leiden (Blessed are the persecuted), continues to be revived occasionally. It is a folk opera which has been compared to Humperdinck's Hansel and Gretel, and contains elements of verismo. After Humperdinck and Siegfried Wagner, the composers of fairy-tale operas, Kienzl is the most important opera composer of the romantic post-Wagner era. However, Kienzl's strengths actually lie in the depiction of everyday scenes. In his last years, his ample corpus of songs achieved prominence, though it has largely been neglected since then.

Despite the fact that opera came first in his life, Kienzl by no means ignored instrumental music. He wrote three string quartets and a piano trio.

== Death ==
Kienzl died in Vienna and is buried in a grave of honor at the Vienna Central Cemetery. In 2007 the Republic of Austria issued a commemorative stamp in Kienzl's honour on the occasion of his 150th birthday.

== See also ==
- List of compositions by Wilhelm Kienzl
