= Jinrikisha =

Jinrikisha may refer to:

- A rickshaw, a two or three-wheeled passenger cart
  - See also: pulled rickshaw, rickshaw (disambiguation)
- Production Jinrikisha, Japanese talent agency
- Jinrikisha Station, a historic building in Singapore
