= Solar rickshaw =

A solar rickshaw is a vehicle, usually three-wheeled, driven by an electric motor and powered either by solar panels or by a battery charged by solar panels.

A solar rickshaw may be a type of:

- Cycle rickshaw, if it is equipped with both pedals and an assisting electric motor
- Electric rickshaw, if its only means of propulsion is one or more electric motors

== See also ==
- Rickshaw (disambiguation)
- Solar vehicle
- Zero-emissions vehicle
