= Ziyue =

Ziyue or Zi Yue may refer to:

== Confucianism ==
- Zǐyuē (子曰), set phrase "Confucius said" in Analects

== Calendar ==
- zǐyuè (子月), month in sexagenary cycle

== People ==
- Zǐyuè (籽月), "Seed Moon" pseudonym of popular female youth novelist and screenwriter If I Were You (2012 Chinese film)
- Liu Ziyue (劉子悅), prince Ziyue, executed 466, one of many children of Emperor Xiaowu of Liu Song
- Sun Ziyue (孙子玥), Chinese tennis player
- Zhao Ziyue (趙子曰), "Confucius-said Zhao" titular character of 1927 comic novel Zhao Ziyue by Lao She

== Music ==
- Ziyue (band), "Confucius Said" Beijing punk band of the 90s
