= Rickshaw (disambiguation) =

A rickshaw is a pedestrian-powered vehicle for carrying one or two passengers.

Rickshaw may also refer to:

== Vehicles ==
=== Human powered ===
- Cycle rickshaw (pedal-powered)
- Pulled rickshaw (pedestrian-powered)

=== Motorized ===
- Auto rickshaw
- Electric rickshaw

== See also ==
- Rick Shaw (disambiguation)
- Rickshaw Run, an adventure race with auto rickshaws in India
- Rickshaw Boy, a 1937 novel by Chinese writer Lao She
  - Rickshaw Boy (opera), a 2014 adaptation of the novel
  - Rickshaw Boy (film), a 1982 Chinese film adaptation
- Rickshaw Man, a 1958 Japanese film
- Rickshawkaran (lit. 'Rickshaw Puller'), a 1971 Indian film by M. Krishnan Nair
- Rickshawala (lit. 'Rickshaw Man'), a 1973 Indian film by K. Shankar
- Rickshaw Mama (lit. 'Rickshaw Uncle'), a 1992 Indian film
- Boda-boda, an African bicycle or motorcycle taxi
