= Pedicab (disambiguation) =

Pedicab usually refer to the cycle rickshaw.

Pedicab may also refer to:

- Pedicab (band), a Filipino rock group
- "Pedicab Confessions", a 2010 episode of The Apprentice
- Pedicab Driver, a 1989 Hong Kong martial arts film
- Pedicab (film)

== See also ==
- Rickshaw (disambiguation)
