= Electric tricycle =

An electric tricycle is a tricycle with an electric motor.

Electric tricycle, electric trike, or electric three-wheeler may also refer to:

- Three-wheeled electric motorcycles and scooters
- Three-wheeled electric rickshaw
- Three-wheeled mobility scooter

== See also ==
- Electric vehicle
- Tricycle
- Velomobile
