= Peaches and Plums in the Spring Wind =

桃李春风
- Written by: Lao She
- Original language: Chinese

Premiere
- Date premiered: 1943
- Place premiered: Beijing

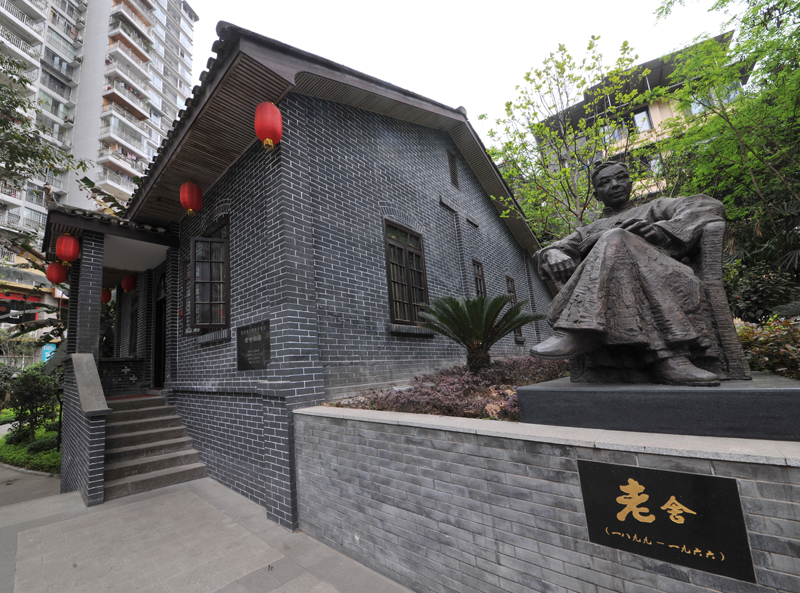
Former residence of Lao She

Peaches and Plums in the Spring Wind (Chinese《桃李春风》) is a 1943 play by Lao She, co-written with Zhao Qingge (赵清阁). It was one of the most successful works of Lao She's 1940s attempts at play-writing; however, despite a cash prize from the government for the play, Lao She then returned to novel writing soon after. The play was written to commemorate the Teacher's Day of 1943, as well as to promote national unity and patriotism.
