= The Yellow Storm =

Yellow Storm may refer to:

- The Yellow Storm, abridged English version by Ida Pruitt (1951) of Lao She's 3-volume novel Four Generations under One Roof
- The Yellow Storm (film) (Chinese: 四世同堂) English release name of Chinese film 1986 Golden Eagle Award for Best Supporting Actress (China)
- El Gouna FC nickname The Yellow Storm (العاصفة الصفراء)
- History of Mars observation F.; Martin, Leonard J. (1971). "The developing stages of the Martian yellow storm of 1971". Bulletin of the Lowell Observatory 7
- Metin Tekin nicknamed as The Yellow Storm ("Sarı Fırtına")
