= Lao Zhang's Philosophy =

Book by Lao She

- A copy of the novel from the Fudan University
- Author: Lao She
- Original title: 老張的哲學
- Language: Chinese
- Published: 1926
- Publication place: China

Cover of the French translation by Claude Payen

Lao Zhang's Philosophy is the 1926 debut novel of Chinese author Lao She, written while Lao She was teaching at London University's School of Oriental Studies (SOS). The novel was a resounding success back in China, and encouraged Lao She to immediately write a second novel set in the same Beijing milieu, Zhao Ziyue, the following year.
