= China (film) =

1943 film by John Farrow

- Lobby card
- Directed by: John Farrow
- Written by: Frank Butler
- Based on: Unproduced play "The Fourth Brother" by Archibald Forbes
- Produced by: Richard Blumenthal
- Starring: Loretta Young; Alan Ladd; William Bendix
- Cinematography: Leo Tover
- Edited by: Eda Warren
- Music by: Victor Young
- Production company: Paramount Pictures
- Distributed by: Paramount Pictures
- Release date: April 21, 1943
- Running time: 79 minutes
- Country: United States
- Language: English
- Budget: $2 million (est.)
- Box office: $2.5 million (US rentals); 1,774,843 admissions (France)

China is a 1943 film directed by John Farrow and starring Loretta Young, Alan Ladd and William Bendix. Ladd's character David Llewellyn Jones, wearing a fedora, a leather jacket, khakis and a beard stubble, was an inspiration for Indiana Jones. Aside from Tala Birell as one of Jones' paramours at the beginning of the film, the entire supporting cast is Asian, including Philip Ahn and Richard Loo.

== Plot ==
In 1941, in China struggling with civil war and the Japanese occupation, Captain Tao-Yuan-Kai wants to execute David Jones for selling oil to the Japanese, but can do nothing because Jones is American. Japanese aircraft bomb the town, so Jones drives toward Shanghai with his partner, Johnny Sparrow, who has acquired a newly orphaned baby boy.

After nightfall, they are forced to stop because Chinese refugees crowd the road. The Chinese beat the Americans and start to take their truck, until Carolyn Grant, an American schoolteacher born in China, tells them to stop. Carolyn sneaks her group of female college students into the back of Jones's truck. As she grew up there and knows the terrain, Carolyn takes over the driving for a while, and has her friend, Lin Wei, sit on the hood to watch for potholes.

When Jones realizes that Carolyn has loaded his truck with refugees, he starts throwing them out (worried he will not have enough gas to get to Shanghai), but relents when he learns that they are Carolyn's students, all young women.

The next day, they encounter Lin Wei's first and second brothers, Lin Cho and Lin Yun, who have formed a guerrilla band and are posing as peasants. Lin Cho warns them to take an alternate road as the Japanese are approaching. Jones reluctantly drives to the family farm of Tan Ying, a girl he tried to throw off the truck, as "Donald Duck" (the baby) needs milk.

At the farm, Carolyn tries again to persuade Jones to take the students to Chungtu, where they can continue their studies, rather than Japanese-occupied Shanghai, but Jones refuses. After Johnny leaves the baby with Tan Ying's family for safekeeping, the journey resumes. They are forced to abandon the truck when Japanese aircraft strafe the road, but Lin Cho and his compatriots shoot the airplane down.

When Carolyn discovers that Tan Ying has slipped off the bus to rejoin her family, she insists on returning for her. While the rest of the group hikes to a monastery, Jones and Carolyn drive back to the farm and are shocked to find that the Japanese have burned the farm, and murdered Tan Ying's parents and Donald Duck. Jones then finds three Japanese soldiers raping Tan Ying, and shoots them without hesitation, while Carolyn comforts the hysterical woman. After the group takes refuge in the monastery, Tan Ying dies.

Finally cognizant of the nature of the Chinese struggle, Jones is now inspired to join the fight against the Japanese, and offers his help to the three brothers. They determine that they must close a mountain pass in order to prevent the further onslaught of the Japanese, but only the Japanese army has the necessary dynamite. That night, Jones, Johnny, Lin Wei, Lin Cho and Lin Yun swim across a river to raid a Japanese encampment and steal the dynamite. When their presence is detected, a fierce gun battle ensues, during which Lin Wei, and all but two other guerrillas, are killed. Before he dies, Lin Wei honors Jones by calling him his "fourth brother."

That night, Carolyn rejects Johnny's marriage proposal because she is in love with Jones, and later, the new lovers Jones and Carolyn spend a final night together. The next day, the small band of fighters places the dynamite along the mountain pass road.

When the Japanese convoy appears early, Jones stops them on the road to give the guerrillas time to lay the dynamite, and pretends that he is stranded. The Japanese general explains to Jones that Japan has just bombed Pearl Harbor in the United States, and that their intention is to create a new world order. After the general's second-in-command shoots Jones, the Chinese set off the dynamite causing an avalanche that buries the Japanese troops, and closes the road. Carolyn and Johnny mourn the loss of their friend as they drive the students to Chungtu.

== Cast ==
- Loretta Young as Carolyn Grant
- Alan Ladd as David Jones
- William Bendix as Johnny Sparrow
- Philip Ahn as Lin Cho, First Brother
- Iris Wong as Kwan Su
- Sen Yung as Lin Wei, Third Brother
- Marianne Quon as Tan Ying
- Jessie Tai Sing as Student
- Richard Loo as Lin Yun, Second Brother
- Irene Tso as "Donald Duck"
- Chingwah Lee as Chang Teh
- Soo Yong as Tai Shen
- Beal Wong as Capt. Tao-Yuan-Kai
- Bruce Wong as Aide To Captain Tao
- Tala Birell as Blonde Russian
- Barbara Jean Wong as Nan Ti
- Chester Gan as Japanese General
- Benson Fong as Guerrilla (uncredited)
- Paul Fung as Japanese Soldier (uncredited)
- Clarence Lung as Guerrilla (uncredited)
- Sammee Tong as Aide to Japanese General (uncredited)

== Production ==
=== Development ===
The script was based on Fourth Brother, an unproduced play by Archibald Forbes about an American oil salesman in China who joins in the fight against the Japanese with three Chinese guerrillas. Paramount bought the screen rights for $25,000 in May 1942.

=== Casting ===
The film originally was considered a vehicle for Loretta Young, who was an enthusiastic supporter of China during the war and who had just signed a three-year deal with Paramount to make two movies a year. By September, Alan Ladd and William Bendix were assigned to the film, with John Farrow to direct, in color. Young pulled out, claiming she was dissatisfied with her role. However, she appears to have changed her mind. "I thought it was going to be good", she said. "It was a war picture. It was full of action and a bit of vindictiveness... pretty little orphan girls."

William Bendix was cast as Ladd's sidekick, a departure from the "heavy" that he had played in earlier roles. He would go on to play Ladd's sidekick in The Blue Dahlia (1946), Calcutta (Shot in 1945, released in 1947) and The Deep Six (1958).

Except for the three leads (and the brief role of Ladd's girlfriend before the journey begins), all of the cast were of Chinese descent or elsewhere in East Asia, causing the filmmakers to look outside normal casting avenues. Sen Yung, Philip Ahn and Richard Loo played lead supporting roles.

Helena Kuo was meant to play a small role but did not end up appearing in the film.

=== Shooting ===
Filming started 27 October 1942. In December Hedda Hopper wrote in her gossip column "wonder why so many battles between producer, director, Loretta Young and Alan Ladd on China? Could it be a bad story? Could be..."

Loretta Young later said she objected to a scene where her character had to condone the suicide of one of the Chinese girls as she would not "propagandize suicide as the answer to anything". (Young was a devout Catholic.) She claimed Farrow and Paramount's head of production Buddy de Sylva agreed to cut the scene, but it reappeared in the script during production. Young refused once more and threatened to leave the film. The scene was not shot.

Young also admitted she had difficulties with Alan Ladd. "He was a whiner and I hate that... Any man who calls for his agent every time he doesn't get his own way and his agent happens to be his wife (Sue Carol) there is something radically wrong. The last little thing that would happen, he'd be on the phone saying, 'Sue, you'd better get over here and straighten this out."

"I don't remember hearing him laugh, or ever seeing him laugh", said Young. "Everything that concerned him was very serious."

China was the third war film in a row John Farrow had directed after being discharged from the Canadian navy. Farrow was keen to make the movie as accurate as possible. "We have a big army and there are bound to be service men in every theatre", he said during the film's shoot. "Not only that, every mother's son has a mother – and you can bet she knows what it's all about too. As far as I'm concerned, when I decide to make a picture about anything – no matter what – I feel I should be truthful."

Ladd was injured during filming the battle scenes, suffering a cut arm and sprained ankle. He also had to make a 20-foot dive off a bridge, which former diver Ladd found easy.

The scene where 4,000 Japanese troops were killed in explosion was thought to set a record for Japanese killed on screen in a Hollywood film.

=== Locations ===
The film was shot in a number of highly scenic locations in both Arizona and California. In the former, these include Apache Trail and areas around Phoenix (which had a population of only 65,000 in 1940). In the latter, Big Tujunga Creek, Iverson Ranch. and canyons in the San Gabriel Mountains.

=== Song ===
Paramount purchased the rights to "Work as One", a popular Chinese marching song by Shu Mo, to use in the film. Part of the purchase price went to the campaign fund for United China Relief. The song was recorded by the All-Chinese Choir of the Chinese First Presbyterian Church of Los Angeles.

== Reception ==
The film premiered in New York at the Paramount in April 1943, with an appearance by Harry James and his orchestra. Teenage fans ended up rioting, smashing a window and breaking a policeman's ribs. "Every indication points to a record breaking run, however", wrote the Los Angeles Times.

The film was a big hit and Paramount reunited Young and Ladd on And Now Tomorrow (1944).

=== Critical reception ===
Bosley Crowther in his film review for The New York Times, noted that Hollywood had churned out an unsatisfactory look at a topical subject, "... a small host of Chinese worthies play their countrymen in the accepted style. But the film scarcely does justice to their country — or to the title which it bears. By and large, it is Hollywood trumpery ..."

The review in Variety was more charitable, noting, "Frank Butler generates authenticity in the dramatic evolvement of his screenplay [from a play by Archibald Forbes], while director John Farrow neatly blends the human and melodramatic elements of the yarn."

The Los Angeles Times wrote that "the hostility expressed in some quarters towards China can probably be laid to the title as much as anything. Hollywood's penchant for the grandiose has a way of kicking back unexpectedly – and China, apparently, has got itself in the pan. Except in the narrow movie sense, it hardly justifies so sweeping a name. In the narrow movie sense the picture is, however, as good as most melodramas treating of some phase of the global war and – in certain moments of realism – rather better than that."

Radley Metzger praised the film, saying John Farrow "brilliantly mastered" the technique of the tracking shot and that China "has the most fabulous shots I've ever seen."
