= Mr Ma and Son =

Satirical novel by Lao She

Er Ma
- A 1943 edition of Mr Ma and Son
- Author: Lao She
- Language: Chinese
- Published: 1929
- Publication place: China

Mr Ma and Son (simplified Chinese: 二马; traditional Chinese: 二馬; pinyin: Ėrmǎ; literally: "The Two Mas" or "Ma and Son") is a satirical novel written by Chinese author Lao She, first serialized in 1929 in the journal Fiction Monthly. Lao She's third novel, it tells of the experiences of a Chinese father and his son in London after taking over the antique shop of his newly deceased brother.

== Plot ==
English language Penguin Modern Classics edition of Mr Ma and Son

The novel is divided into five parts. It chronicles the experiences of a Chinese widower, Ma Zeren (simplified Chinese: 马则仁; traditional Chinese: 馬則仁), usually referred to in the text as Mr. Ma, and his son Ma Wei (simplified Chinese: 马威; traditional Chinese: 馬威), as they journey to London to take over an antique shop left by Mr Ma's deceased brother, located near St Paul's Cathedral. They are recommended as lodgers to an English landlady, Mrs. Wedderburn, by Mr Ma's English clergyman, Reverend Ely. In the course of the novel, Mr. Ma and his son face anti-Chinese racism of all kinds, while Mr. Ma falls in love with Mrs. Wedderburn and Ma Wei falls for Mrs Wedderburn's daughter, Mary.

The novel is an acerbic satire revealing both the West's prejudice against the Chinese and China's "failure to stand up for itself in the world", according to academic Julia Lovell.

== Characters ==
- Ma Zeren (simplified Chinese: 马则仁; traditional Chinese: 馬則仁)
- Ma Wei (simplified Chinese: 马威; traditional Chinese: 馬威)
- Li Zirong (simplified Chinese: 李子荣; traditional Chinese: 李子榮)
- Reverend Ely (simplified Chinese: 伊牧师; traditional Chinese: 伊牧師)
- Mrs Wedderburn (simplified Chinese: 温都太太; traditional Chinese: 溫都太太)
- Mary Wedderburn (simplified Chinese: 玛力; traditional Chinese: 瑪力)
- Catherine Ely (simplified Chinese: 凯萨林; traditional Chinese: 凱薩林)
