= Hu Jieqing =

Chinese painter

- Chinese: 胡絜青
Transcriptions
Standard Mandarin
- Hanyu Pinyin: Hú Jiéqīng
- Wade–Giles: Hu2 Chieh2-ch'ing1

Hu Jieqing (Chinese: 胡絜青; pinyin: Hú Jiéqīng; December 23, 1905 - May 21, 2001) was a contemporary Chinese painter who descended from the Manchu people. She was the wife of the Manchu writer Lao She, and Qi Baishi was her master.

== Biography ==
Hu, a native of Beijing, was born as Yuzhen (玉贞). Like her husband, she belonged to the Manchu minority of China. Her pen names were Yan Yan (燕崖) and Hu Chun (胡春). She had the sobriquet, Jieqing (洁青). She graduated from the department of Chinese literature at Beijing Normal University in 1931. She married Lao She in 1931 and accompanied him in the following years and taught literature at some normal schools.

In 1938, she got to know Qi Baishi, and in 1950 she officially became his student. In 1958, she was hired by the Chinese Academy of Painting in Beijing as a senior artist. In 1980, she held her personal exhibition in Hong Kong and published her album.

She was a member of the Artists Association of China and a member of Calligraphers Association of China.

She died at 4:27 pm on May 21, 2001 at Hepingli Hospital, at the age of 95.

== Legacy ==
Hu Jieqing is commemorated together with her husband at the Lao She Memorial Hall, opened in 1999 at 19 Fengfu Lane, close to Wangfujing, in Dongcheng District. Hu Jieqing called the house 'Red Persimmon Courtyard'. It contained persimmon trees planted by her husband.

== Family ==
Hu Jieqing and Lao She had four children, Shu Ji, Shu Yi, Shu Yu and Shu Li.
