= Helena Kuo =

Chinese-American writer and translator

Kuo Ching-ch'iu (Chinese: 郭鏡秋; 1911 – April 25, 1999), also known as Helena Kuo, was a Chinese-American writer and translator.

She was born in Macao and was educated at Lingnan University and Shanghai University. She worked for the Shanghai Evening News and other Chinese newspapers during the 1930s. When Japan invaded China in 1937, Kuo escaped to England, where she became a columnist for the London Daily Mail. In 1939, she moved to the United States. Kuo married the painter Dong Kingman in 1956.

Kuo worked as a translator for the Voice of America and the United States Information Agency. She was an adviser for the 1943 movie China. She also translated two novels by Lao She: The Quest for Love of Lao Lee (1948) and The Drum Singer (1952).

She died in hospital in Taipei at the age of 86; she was in Taiwan to attend a reception for her husband at the Taiwan Museum of Art.

== Selected works ==
- Peach Path, collected essays (1940)
- I've Come a Long Way, autobiography (1942)
- Westward to Chungking, novel (1944)
- Giants of China, biographical sketches (1944)
- Doug Kingman's Watercolours, non-fiction (1952)
