= Rickshaw Boy (opera) =

NCPA official documentary on the making of the opera

Rickshaw Boy or Camel Xiangzi (Chinese: 骆驼祥子; pinyin: Luòtuo Xiángzi; lit. 'Camel the Auspicious Lad') is a 2014 Chinese contemporary classical opera by Guo Wenjing to a libretto by Xu Ying after Lao She's Rickshaw Boy. It was premiered at the NCPA, China in June 2014. NCPA Classics released both a DVD recording of the opera, and also a separate making-of documentary entitled Xiángzi de yǒngtàn (Xiangzi's chant) in 2017.
