= Rickshaw Boy =

1937 novel by Lao She

- Cover of a copy of Rickshaw Boy, scan from the National Library of China
- Author: Lao She
- Language: Chinese
- Published: 1937
- Publication place: China

Rickshaw Boy
- "Rickshaw Boy ("Luotuo xiangzi") in Traditional (top) and Simplified (bottom) Chinese characters
- Traditional Chinese: 駱駝祥子
- Simplified Chinese: 骆驼祥子
- Literal meaning: "Camel the Auspicious Lad"
Transcriptions
Standard Mandarin
- Hanyu Pinyin: Luòtuo xiángzi
- Gwoyeu Romatzyh: Luoh.tuo shyang.tzy
- Wade–Giles: Lo^{4}-t'o^{5} hsiang^{2}-tzu^{5}
- IPA: [lwô.tʰwo ɕjǎŋ.tsɨ]
Yue: Cantonese
- Yale Romanization: Lok-tòh chèuhng-jí
- Jyutping: Lok^{3}-to^{4} coeng^{4}-zi^{2}
Southern Min
- Tâi-lô: Lo̍k-tô siông-tsú

Rickshaw Boy or Camel Xiangzi (Chinese: 骆驼祥子; pinyin: Luòtuo Xiángzi; lit. 'Camel Auspicious Lad') is a novel by the Chinese author Lao She about the life of a fictional Beijing rickshaw man. It is considered a classic of 20th-century Chinese literature.

== History ==
Lao She began the novel in spring 1936, and it was published in installments in the magazine Yuzhou feng ("Cosmic wind") beginning in January 1937. Lao She returned to China from the United States after the establishment of the People's Republic of China in 1949. In an afterword dated September 1954, included in the Foreign Languages Press edition of Rickshaw Boy, Lao She said that he had edited the manuscript ("taken out some of the coarser language and some unnecessary descriptions") and he expressed regret for the lack of hope expressed in the original edition.

In 1945, Evan King published an unauthorized translation of the novel. He cut, rearranged, rewrote, invented characters, and changed the ending. Two characters, the girl student and One Pock Li, are King's inventions, not Lao She's. King also added considerable embellishment to the two seduction scenes. Despite the liberties taken, the book was a bestseller in the United States and a Book of the Month club selection.

== Characters ==
- Xiangzi

A strong young man who moves to Beiping in the 1920s, where he finds employment first as a laborer and then as a rickshaw puller. He hopes to become independent through hard work, honesty, and thrift, but frequent misfortune leads his life and character to degradation.

- Huniu

The daughter of Fourth Master Liu, owner of the Harmony Shed from which Xiangzi often rents rickshaws. Described as unattractive and coarse, Huniu nevertheless cares for Xiangzi and eventually manipulates him into marrying her. Her death and the death of their unborn child accelerate Xiangzi's descent into despair and more severe poverty.

- Fourth Master Liu

The owner of Harmony Shed and Huniu's father. A veteran of Beijing's underworld, Fourth Master Liu initially appreciates Xiangzi's exceptional work ethic. Eventually, he disowns Huniu following her marriage to Xiangzi in order to prevent them from inheriting his assets.

- Mr. Cao

Xiangzi's sometime employer. A university lecturer and socialist influenced by William Morris, Cao and his wife treat Xiangzi with relative kindness. A political dispute involving one of Cao's students forms a secondary plot to the story.

- Old man and Xiao Ma

A prematurely aged rickshaw puller and his grandson whom Xiangzi encounters in a teahouse. He is moved by their hardships, purchasing food for them. His encounters with the old man eventually convince Xiangzi of the fruitlessness of life as a rickshaw puller.

- Fuzi

The daughter of an impoverished family in the compound where Huniu and Xiangzi set up home following their marriage, Fuzi is the daughter of Er Qiangzi. Sold by her father to an army officer who then abandons her, Fuzi is forced into prostitution and later sold to a brothel, The White Manor. During their time as neighbors, she and Huniu become occasional friends.

- Er Qiangzi

Little Fuzi's father. Formerly a rickshaw puller, Er Qiangzi squanders the money from the sale of his daughter on alcohol, eventually relying on her earnings to support his addiction.

- Platoon Leader Sun

An officer in the warlord army which kidnaps Xiangzi and confiscates his first rickshaw. Later, as a secret police detective, Sun blackmails Xiangzi into handing over the money he'd saved for a second rickshaw.

== Plot ==
A 1946 edition of Rickshaw Boy

Set in the 1920s, the novel's protagonist is an orphaned peasant who moves to Beijing to earn a living. Xiangzi is a young, hard-working, well-built rickshaw puller who dreams of owning his own rickshaw. He distinguishes between himself and other rickshaw men who spend their money on cigarettes and liquor, instead avoiding socializing and focusing on saving his earnings. Just when he has earned enough to buy a rickshaw, it is confiscated by warlord soldiers. As he leaves, he spots some camels captured by the soldiers. He takes the camels and escapes and later sells them, earning the unwanted nickname Camel. However, the cash Xiangzi obtains from this is not enough for him to buy another new rickshaw, forcing him to begin saving anew. He is hired by Mr. Cao, a university lecturer who pays little but offers steady employment and fair treatment. Cao is later implicated by Ruan Ming, one of his students. During the course of the investigation, Platoon Leader Sun, a secret policeman, extorts Xiangzi into handing over his savings, leaving Xiangzi penniless again. Left with no choice, Xiangzi returns to work for Fourth Master Liu, the boss of a thriving rickshaw rental company.

Although honest and industrious, Xiangzi finds himself entangled between Fourth Master Liu and his manipulative daughter Huniu, ten years his senior. Huniu eventually seduces Xiangzi, deceives him into thinking she is carrying his child, and insists on marrying him. He later learns that she had faked her pregnancy by hiding a pillow under her coat. Her father disowns her and the couple live together in a tenement compound, progressively becoming poorer due to Huniu's spendthrift ways and Xiangzi's meager earnings. Later, Huniu befriends the meek and long-suffering Fuzi, whose alcoholic father has forced her into prostitution, renting her a room in which to meet clients. But soon Huniu expels Fuzi as she guesses Xiangzi is love with her, who is much younger than she was. When Huniu becomes genuinely pregnant, she becomes sedentary and over-indulges in rich food, complicating her health. One winter day, Xiangzi meets an aging rickshaw puller and his grandson, Xiao Ma. After buying food for them, Xiangzi becomes disillusioned with his ambition of owning his own rickshaw.

When Huniu dies during childbirth and Xiangzi's infant child is stillborn, Xiangzi is distraught. Despite initially finding comfort in Fuzi, Xiangzi is reluctant to remarry due to his own poverty and the fact that Fuzi provides for two younger brothers. Overcome by apathy and depression, Xiangzi indulges in alcohol, tobacco, and prostitutes, becoming friendlier with his fellow rickshaw pullers but less diligent in his work. He eventually resolves to return to his former industrious ways, relating his life to Mr. Cao, who then offers him his old job and lodging for Fuzi.

However, when Xiangzi returns to the tenement compound where he once lived with Huniu, he finds Fuzi's home empty. While searching for her, Xiangzi once again meets the old man he once took pity on. No longer pulling a rickshaw, the old man became a peddler after his grandson died. His advice leads Xiangzi to a brothel called The White Manor, to which Fuzi was sold. Fuzi had hanged herself in a grove outside the bawdyhouse. This sequence of events finally destroys Xiangzi's industriousness and ambition.

Xiangzi begins "a downward spiral that carried him to society's lowest rung." No longer thrifty, he spends his earnings on alcohol, tobacco, and brothels, becoming lazy, selfish, and dishonest, neglecting his physical appearance and health, and contracting numerous cases of unspecified veneral diseases. Having given up on his dream of owning his own rickshaw, he behaves as unscrupulously as the rickshaw pullers he once looked down on, and takes low-paying, low-effort jobs carrying political banners. When Ruan Ming takes money from an unnamed political group to unionize Beijing's rickshaw pullers, Xiangzi sells him out for a small sum. His advancing venereal disease ends his career as a rickshaw puller, forcing him to take menial jobs as a professional mourner, his body prematurely decaying and his spirit broken.

== Subject matter and themes ==
The major subject matter of Rickshaw Boy is the way in which the hero makes his living pulling a rickshaw, the options he faces and choices he makes, and especially the fundamental issues of whether to work independently or as a servant to a family, and whether to rent or own a rickshaw. It also describes a series of adventures he has and his interactions with a number of other characters.

Beijing -- "filthy, beautiful, decadent, bustling, chaotic, idle, lovable"—is important as a backdrop for the book. "The only friend he had was this ancient city." (p. 31)

The book explores the intimate relationship between man and machine (the rickshaw), and the evolution of that relationship. The relationship is both financial, requiring months and years of calculation to graduate from being a renter to being an owner, and physical. "His strength seemed to permeate every part of the rickshaw. . . . he was energetic, smooth in his motions, precise. He didn't appear to be in any hurry and yet he ran very fast . . . . "

Another important theme that the book explores is the relationship between the characters’ development and their economic existence. As Xiangzi pulls a rickshaw, the author says that "A man with his physique, his ability to endure so much, and his determination should not be treated like a pig or a dog and ought to be able to hold down a job." As his job depends on his physical wellbeing, his economic status becomes more precarious as his earnings dwindle and he gives way to common vices, leaving him little money for food and further weakaning his economic status. "No matter how hard you work or how ambitious you are, you must not start a family, you must not get sick, and you must not make a single mistake!" "If you avoid dying of starvation when young, good for you. But it was almost impossible to avoid dying of starvation when old."

In addition, the novel explores elements of naturalism. The novel often presents controversial topics such as infant mortality, child labor, domestic abuse, etc.

Most importantly, the novel profoundly satirizes the cruelty of Chinese society during the pre-War Republican era. Xiangzi was born into poverty and presented with few options to escape it, leading him to believe that the hard work and honesty of his youth were a waste and hastening his descent.

Finally, isolation and individualism are some of the most important themes in the book. "His life might well be ruined by his own hands but he wasn't about to sacrifice anything for anybody. He who works for himself knows how to destroy himself. These are the two starting points of Individualism."

== Historical significance ==
The characterization or point of view in Rickshaw Boy in some ways reflects the influence of Russian literature in the early 20th-century leftists Chinese literary scenes in general, and particularly on the way that influence was transferred to China by Lu Xun in stories such as The True Story of Ah Q and "Diary of a Madman".

The subject matter of Rickshaw Boy aligned with concerns of Chinese leftists and the Chinese Communist Party, but Lao She had never fully aligned himself with the left. For instance, the final sentences read, "Handsome, ambitious, dreamer of fine dreams, selfish, individualistic sturdy, great Hsiang Tzu. No one knows how many funerals he marched in, and no one knows when or where he was able to get himself buried, that degenerate, selfish, unlucky offspring of society's diseased womb, a ghost caught in Individualism's blind alley."

Lao She went on to play a leading role in literary associations endorsed by the government, such as the China Federation of Literary and Art Circles. According to the introductory section of the Foreign Languages Press (Beijing) English translation, "Before Liberation [Lao She] wrote many works of literature, including his best novel Camel Xiangzi (or Rickshaw Boy) to expose and denounce the old society."

In 1948, leftist critic Xu Jia lamented that Lao She intended to depict a sick society or bad luck that drove Xiangzi to his fate. The excessive depiction of sex and the negative implicit comments on Chinese society in Rickshaw Boy contributed to the popularity of earlier translations in the United States. China was depicted as chaotic, corrupt, poor, and backward, which was exactly how foreigners liked to see it. By creating the character of Ruan Ming who is a dishonest, hypocritical revolutionary, the Chinese revolution may be discredited.(subscription required)

In 1950, Baren argued that "Lao She failed to depict the revolutionary potential of rickshaw pullers" and that his novel expressed a "reactionary" attitude, which is why the novel was not emphasized in literary histories and college textbooks in China between 1949 and the mid-1980s, and why during this time new editions were expurgated, deleting the novel's pessimistic conclusion, including Fuzi's suicide, turning Ruan Ming into a positive or neutral character, and removing scatological language and description of "naturalistic" detail, mostly to do with sex.

In 1955, Lao She claimed that Rickshaw Boy was intended to show sympathy for the working class and he did not mean to say that the source of hope in Rickshaw Boy was revolution. Lao She apologized for this and expressed gratitude to the Chinese Communist Party and Mao Zedong. However, the censorship established in the People's Republic of China after the civil war required changes to Lao She's novel in terms of "negative image depiction". The novel was not republished in its original version until 1982.

Lao She enjoyed a prestigious position in the Chinese literary establishment and was named a "People's Artist" and "Great Master of Language." However, at the beginning of the Cultural Revolution, he was severely persecuted. His 1932 novel Cat Country lampooned communism, and the Red Guards paraded him through the streets and beat him in public. Being humiliated both mentally and physically, he, according to the official record, committed suicide by drowning himself in Beijing's Taiping Lake in 1966.

== English translations ==
Reynal & Hitchcock (New York) published an English translation by Evan King in 1945 under the English title Rickshaw Boy ("by Lau Shaw"). According to Jean M. James ("Note on the Text and the Translation" in the James edition), "King cut, rearrange, rewrote, invented characters, and changed the ending." King changed various aspects of the original story, including the addition of two characters, rearrangement of the plot, and rewriting the ending. In order to create a happy ending pleasing to American audiences, the English translation has Xiangzi rescue Fuzi (rendered as "Little Lucky One") from the brothel. Lao She never agreed to these changes, but because there was no copyright agreement between China and the United States at the time, he could not prevent the spread of this version of the novel.

The first representative translation of the novel was by Jean M. James, published by the University of Hawaii Press in 1979 under the English title Rickshaw: the novel Lo-t'o Hsiang Tzu. It is based on the 1939 edition.

Foreign Languages Press (Beijing) published an English translation by Shi Xiaojing (Lynette Shi) in 1988 under the English title Camel Xiangzi. It is based on the revised edition.

The most recent translation is Rickshaw Boy: A Novel (New York: Harper Perennial Modern Chinese Classics, 2010) by Howard Goldblatt (ISBN 9780061436925). For this translation, Goldblatt went back to the 1939 first edition and consulted the 1941 edition.

== Adaptations ==
The story was adapted as Rickshaw Boy (1982) directed by Ling Zifeng. An opera based on the novel, composed by Guo Wenjing to a libretto by Xu Ying, premiered at the National Centre for the Performing Arts (China) in June 2014.

== References and further reading ==
- Vohra, Ranbir (1974). Lao She and the Chinese Revolution. Cambridge, Mass.: East Asian Research Center, Harvard University; distributed by Harvard University Press. ISBN 0674510755.
- Hsia, Chih-tsing (1961). A History of Modern Chinese Fiction, 1917-1957. New Haven: Yale University Press.
- Song, Yuwu (2013). Biographical Dictionary of the People's Republic of China. Jefferson: McFarland. ISBN 9781476602981.
- Wang, Dewei (1992). Fictional Realism in Twentieth-Century China: Mao Dun, Lao She, Shen Congwen. New York: Columbia University Press. ISBN 0231076568.
- Moran, T. (2021). Resignation Open Eyed: On the Novel Rickshaw Boy by Lao She. In A Companion to World Literature, K. Seigneurie (Ed.). https://doi.org/10.1002/9781118635193.ctwl0207
