= Cat Country =

1933 novel by Lao She

- 1947 Chinese edition
- Author: Lao She
- Original title: 貓城記 / 猫城记
- Translator: William A. Lyell
- Language: Chinese
- Genre: dystopian satire
- Published: 1932, 1933
- Publisher: Xiandai Shuju
- Publication place: China
- English publication date: 1970
- OCLC: 966097069

Cat Country (simplified Chinese: 猫城记; traditional Chinese: 貓城記; pinyin: Māochéngjì, also translated as City of Cats) is a dystopian satirical novel by Chinese writer Lao She (1899–1966), first published in 1933. It has been translated into English, French, German, Hungarian, Japanese, Lithuanian and Russian.

== Background and publication ==
Lao She had lived in England for six years before returning to China in 1930. In 1931, while living in Jinan, he wrote a novel about the Jinan incident called Lake Daming. However, the manuscript was lost when the Shanghai-based publisher, Commercial Press, was attacked by the Japanese in the January 28 incident. Lao She then turned to a new project and started Cat Country, which had been commissioned by Shi Zhecun. The novel first appeared in serialised form between August 1932 and April 1933 in the journal Xiandai (現代 / "Les Contemporains") and then as a standalone book in August 1933, published by Xiandai Shuju (現代書局) in Shanghai. It was reprinted seven times until 1949, and then no edition appeared in the PRC until 1984.

== Plot ==
The unnamed first-person narrator's spaceship crash-lands on Mars. His companion perishes in the crash, and he is stranded alone on Mars. He soon meets the planet's inhabitants, who have the faces of cats but otherwise appear human, and is captured by some of these cats and meets the leader of the group, called Scorpion, a landlord who owns a plantation of "reverie leaves", an addictive drug reminiscent of opium that is used by all cats. The narrator is employed by Scorpion to guard his reverie leaves and eventually learns Felinese and gets acquainted with the country and its culture, guided by Scorpion and his son Young Scorpion. He encounters many problems in society, including ill-treatment of women, lack of hygiene and poor building standards, culminating in a visit to a school where a single gunshot makes the walls collapse. The schools give out university diplomas on the first day, and the museums are filled with empty rooms as the contents have been sold off to foreigners. The political debate is dominated by "brawls", political parties modeled after foreign systems, with the currently leading ideology being "Everybody Shareskyism", whose leader killed and then replaced the cats' emperor, and slogans composed of pseudo-Russian gibberish. Many cat people are killed in a revolution, and finally the country is invaded by a foreign power. The invaders lock up the remaining cat people in a cage, and they end up biting each other to death. Some months later, the narrator is rescued by a passing French spacecraft.

== Analysis and interpretation ==
The novel is a dystopian satire. It has been described as critical of Kuomintang's rule, and the corruption in society in that time, but also more generally suspicious of political indoctrination in China. The critique of political parties (called "brawls") has been seen as applicable to KMT and communists alike. Overall, many purported weaknesses of the Chinese national character are examined, and the satire criticises conservatives as well as radicals.

The novel shows the influence of European utopian literature and is reminiscent of Jonathan Swift's Gulliver's Travels, both in its exaggerated satirical tone and in the use of animal-like creatures. While the setting on Mars, the acknowledged influence of H. G. Wells' The First Men in the Moon and the dystopian content have led to Cat Country being classified as science fiction, there is little interest in technology, and some authors have declared it to not be science fiction. Nevertheless, it has been seen as the most prominent example of Chinese science fiction between 1910 and 1949.

== Critical reception ==
Lao She declared his attempt at satire a failure, lamenting its lack of humour, and some critics have described the book as not a great novel. Cyril Birch describes it as sound in structure and fun, but very uneven. Koon-Ki Tommy Ho argues that many critics evaluated Cat Country by standards not applicable to utopian fiction, and states the book "placed [Lao She] among the successful modern writers of dystopia in world literature."

== Bibliography ==
- Isaacson, Nathaniel (7 February 2017). Celestial Empire: The Emergence of Chinese Science Fiction. Wesleyan University Press. ISBN 978-0-8195-7669-9.
- Johnson, Ian. Introduction. In: Lao She (1 August 2013). Cat Country. Penguin Group Australia. ISBN 978-0-14-380022-4.
