= Four Generations Under One Roof =

1944 novel by Lao She

Four Generations under One Roof
- Part two, volume one cover, 1946
- Author: Lao She
- Original title: 四世同堂 Sì Shì Tóng Táng
- Language: Chinese
- Published: 1944-1945 (3 parts)
- Publication place: China

Four Generations Under One Roof (四世同堂; Sì Shì Tóng Táng) is a 1944 novel by Lao She describing the life of the Chinese people during the Japanese occupation. The novel is divided into three parts：Bewilderment (惶惑), Ignominy (偷生), and Famine (饥荒). An abridged translation by Ida Pruitt, The Yellow Storm, was published in 1951.

Part one and part two of the novel were published in China during the mid-1940s; all three parts of the novel were first published in unabridged form in 1982. In 2016, about 100,000 words of the original manuscript of the English-language translation of Famine were recovered.

== Development ==
Publication of Four Generations Under One Roof began in 1944, after Lao She began the novel in 1941 about the Second Sino-Japanese War. After shelving it for a time, he came up with a framework from his wife's experiences and began to write the novel in Chongqing. Writing lasted for four years, between the end of the war and the author's invitation to lecture abroad. In 1948, Lao She finished the million-word novel in the United States.

With Pearl S. Buck's help, Lao She completed the final part of Four Generations Under One Roof (Famine) in his rented apartment in New York at the end of June 1948. American publishers decided to publish it in English. Lao She agreed, and he and Ida Pruitt worked on the translation. Lao She sent Pearl S. Buck the first 10 translated chapters; Buck approved, and he and Pruitt finished the translation. The abridged, 100-chapter English translation was published as The Yellow Storm in 1951. Four Generations Under a Roof was published that year in Japan and became a best-seller.

Lao She gave the manuscript of Famine to Zhou Erfu (周而复), chief editor of Shanghai Literature Magazine, after returning to China. "Famine" was serialized in Literary magazine in 1950, but the magazine ceased publication at chapter 87. The manuscript of the last 13 chapters was also destroyed during the Cultural Revolution. After the revolution, Lao She's son Shu Yi （舒乙）found that the English version of Four Generations Under One Roof had been mailed to Lao She by the American publisher. To supply the missing parts of the Chinese version, the People's Literature Publishing House published a translation of the last 13 chapters of the English version of Four Generations Under One Roof in 1983. In September 2017, the novel was published for the first time in its full form by the Oriental Publishing Center.

== Analysis ==
Cover of the three-volume French edition

Four Generations Under One Roof explores the disasters of a nation, revealing the suffering of a country. Set during the Second Sino-Japanese War, the novel examines the role of family in traditional Chinese culture. Its environment is an ordinary hutong (a narrow street) in Beijing. The humiliating, tragic experiences of a number of members of several families reflect the bewilderment of the city's residents during the eight-year war in which their families and country are slowly, painfully destroyed. The novel takes a critical look at Chinese family culture (which affects the nation as a whole), questioning how China could have been invaded by Japan. If the Chinese people do not change their cultural mentality of "many children, much happiness" and the ideal of a four-generation family, they will become irrelevant.

== Influence ==
Zhu Donglin called Four Generations Under One Roof "one of the most acclaimed novels and one of the best novels published in the United States at the same time." According to Kong Qingdong, "The most valuable thing about Lao She's Four Generations in the Same House is that it can present positive power in a peaceful natural state, showing the unyielding spirit of people in daily life, thus highlighting the idea that evil does not overpower good." At the end of his preface to the French translation of "Four Generations Under One Roof"，French Nobel literature laureate Jean-Marie Gustave Le Clézio wrote："Lao She, with the eyes of a master, inspired me."

== Publication ==
The first part was serialized in 1944 in Chongqing's Sao Tang Pao. The second part was serialized the following year in Chongqing's World Daily. Bewilderment and Ignominy were published in 1946 by Chenguang Press. The Yellow Storm, the English-language translation by Ida Pruitt, was published in 1951 by Harcourt and Brace. In 1982, a translation by Ma Xiaomi of the 1951 American edition was serialized in the magazine October by October Press.
