= Zhao Ziyue =

Novel by Lao She

- Author: Lao She
- Language: Chinese
- Publication place: China

Zhao Ziyue (Chinese: 趙子曰, "Confucius-saith Zhao") is a 1927 Chinese novel by Lao She. His second novel, like the first, The Philosophy of Old Zhang, the story is set among students in Beijing following the May Fourth Incident. However, the tone of the book is less sympathetic to students, showing the pretentiously named title character and his circle as unprincipled and shallow rather than as victims.
