= Pulled rickshaw =

Mode of human-powered transport

Chinese name
- Traditional Chinese: 人力車
- Simplified Chinese: 人力车
Transcriptions
Standard Mandarin
- Hanyu Pinyin: rénlìchē
- Wade–Giles: jên^{2}-li^{4}-chʻê^{1}

Japanese name
- Kanji: 力車
- Hiragana: りきしゃ
Transcriptions
- Romanization: rikisha

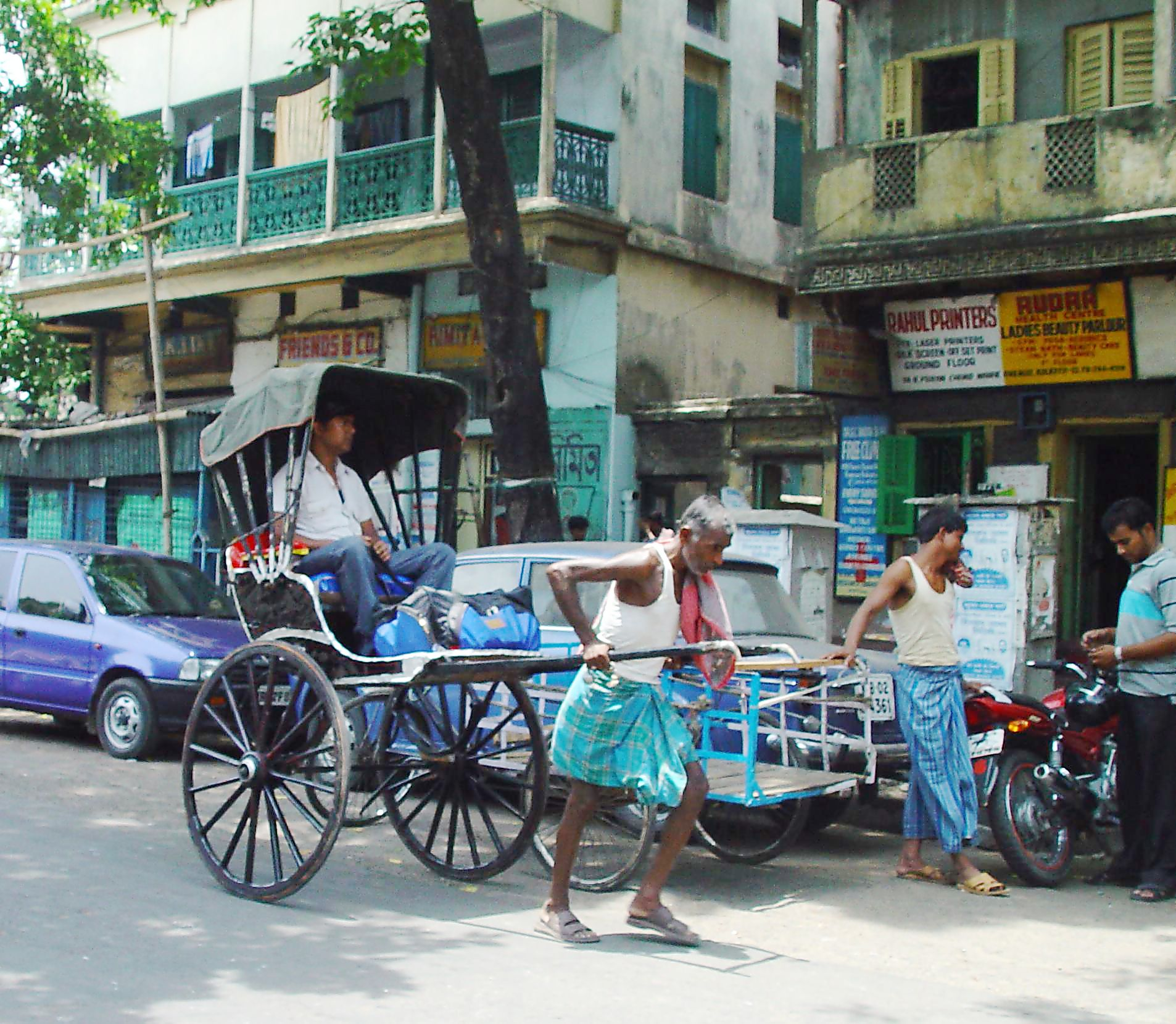
Pulled rickshaw, Kolkata, 2004

A pulled rickshaw (from Japanese jinrikisha (人力車) 'person/human-powered vehicle') is a mode of human-powered transport by which a runner draws a two-wheeled cart that seats one or two people.

In recent times the use of human-powered rickshaws has been discouraged or outlawed in many countries due to concern for the welfare of rickshaw workers. Pulled rickshaws have been replaced mainly by cycle rickshaws and auto rickshaws.

== Overview ==
Rickshaws are commonly believed to have been invented in Japan in the 1860s, at the beginning of a period of rapid technical advancement. In the 19th century, rickshaw pulling became an inexpensive, popular mode of transportation across Asia.

Peasants who migrated to large Asian cities often worked first as a rickshaw runner. It was "the deadliest occupation in the East, [and] the most degrading for human beings to pursue." (Note: In China, coolies performed rickshaw pulling. Other hard or demeaning jobs included being night soil cleaners and dock workers.)

The rickshaw's popularity in Japan declined by the 1930s with the advent of automated forms of transportation, like automobiles and trains. In China, the rickshaw's popularity began to decline in the 1920s. In Singapore, the rickshaw's popularity increased into the 20th century. There were approximately 50,000 rickshaws in 1920, and that number doubled by 1930.

== Description ==
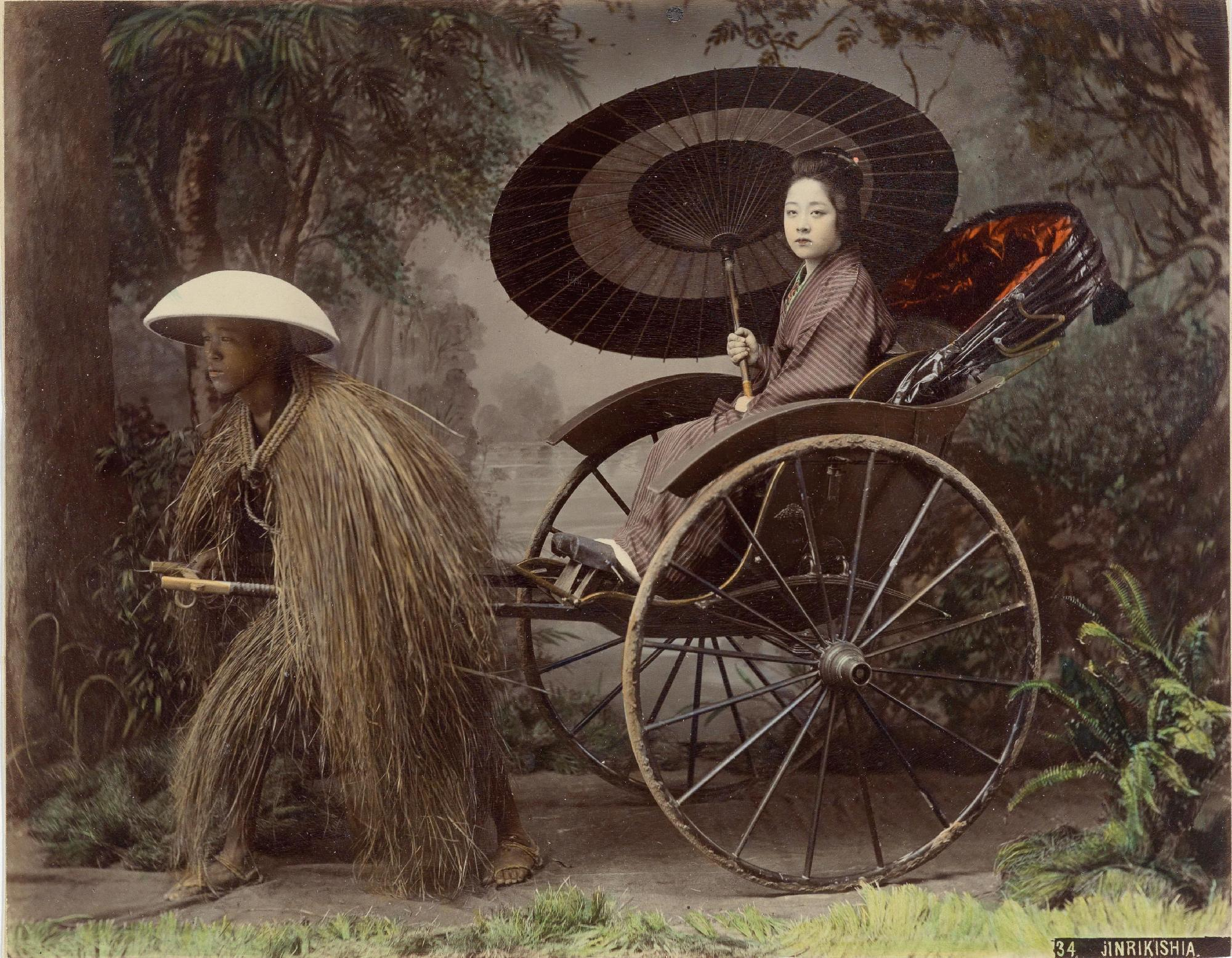
A lady with a parasol, Jinrikisha, circa 1880

The initial rickshaws rode on iron-shod wooden wheels, and the passenger sat on hard, flat seats. In the late 19th century and early 20th century, rubber or pneumatic rubber tires, spring cushions, and backrests improved the passenger's comfort. Other features, such as lights, were also added.

In the city of Shanghai, public rickshaws were painted yellow to differentiate them from the private vehicles of the wealthy citizens, which were described as:

... always shiny, were carefully maintained, and sported 'a spotless white upholstered double seat, a clean plaid for one's lap, and a wide protective tarpaulin to protect the passenger (or passengers, since sometimes up to three people rode together) against the rain.

The rickshaws were a convenient means of travel, able to traverse winding, narrow city streets. During monsoon season, passengers might be carried out of the carriage, above the flooded streets, to the door of their arrival. They offered door-to-door travel, unlike scheduled public bus and tram service.

== Country overview ==
=== Africa ===
==== East Africa ====
In the 1920s, it was used in Bagamoyo and Tanga in Tanzania, and other areas of East Africa for short distances.

==== Madagascar ====
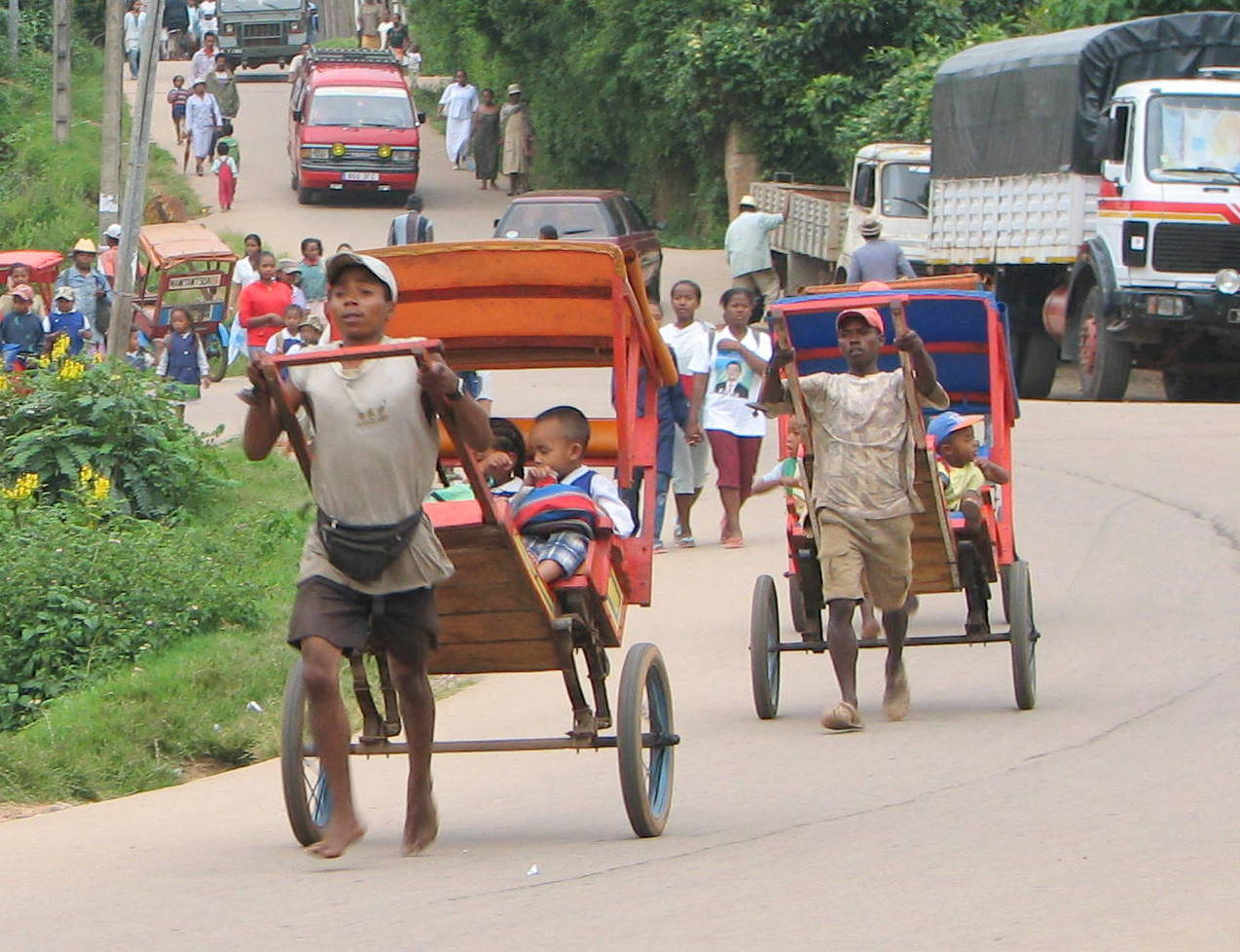
Pousse-pousse in Madagascar

Rickshaws, known as pousse-pousse, were introduced by British missionaries. The intention was to eliminate the slavery-associated palanquin. Its name, pousse-pousse, meaning push-push, is reportedly gained from the need to have a second person to push the back of the rickshaw on Madagascar's hilly roads. They are a common form of transport in a number of Malagasy cities, especially Antsirabe, but are not found in the towns or cities with very hilly roads. They are similar to Chinese rickshaws and are often brightly decorated.

The author Dervla Murphy described the pousse-pousse whilst in Antananarivo in 1983: "Second-hand furniture, bales of hay and the like – were piled high on speedy two-man-power rickshaws. These are pulled by one runner and pushed by another who on ground level uses only his forehead, keeping his hands clasped behind his back."

==== Nairobi ====
Rickshaws operated in Nairobi in the beginning of the 20th century; pullers went on strike there in 1908.

==== South Africa ====
Durban is famous for its iconic Zulu rickshaw pullers navigating throughout the city. These colorful characters are famous for their giant, vibrant hats and costumes. They were introduced into Natal by Sir Marshall Campbell in the 1890s. There were about 2,000 registered men who pulled rickshaws in Durban in 1904. Since displaced by motorised transport, there are approximately 25 rickshaws left who mostly cater to tourists today.

=== Asia ===
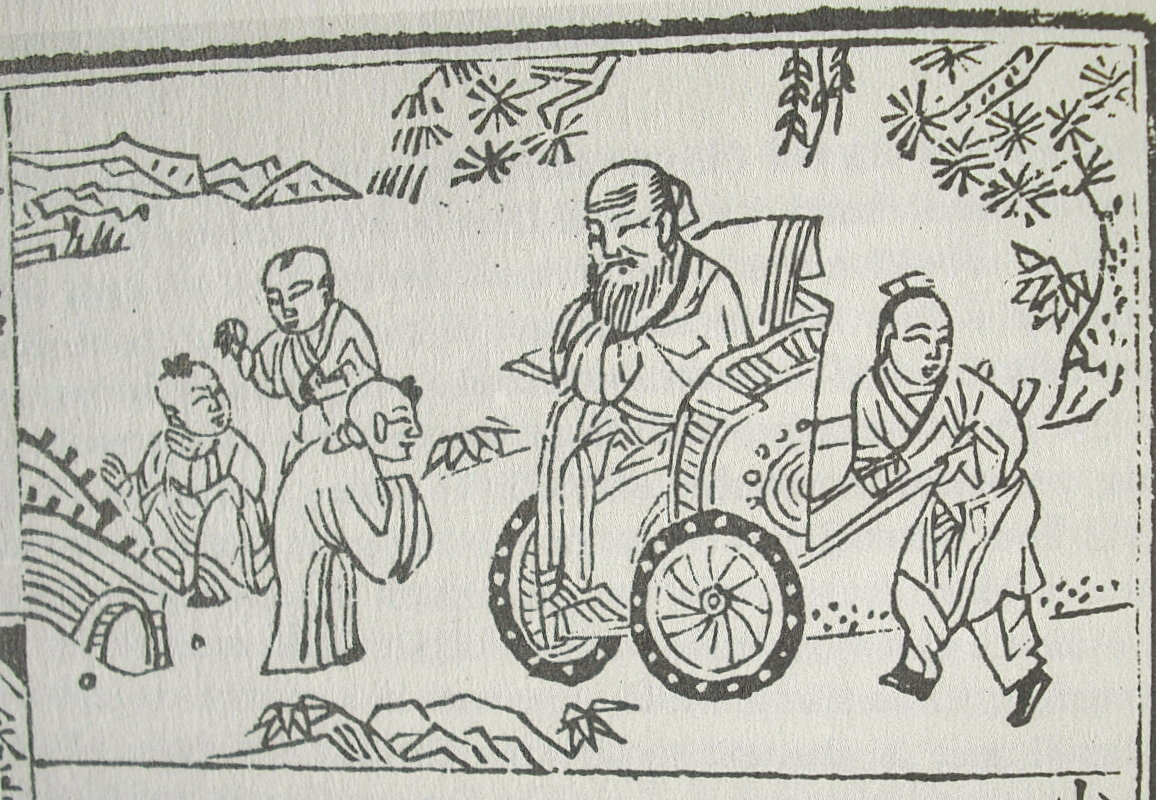
Confucius (transported in a wheeled cart) and children, as imagined by a 17th-century Chinese artist; presumably, the design is similar to the vehicles used at the time. (Illustration from a children's book, Xiao er lun, printed in 1680)

==== China ====
In China, from ancient times until the 19th century, rich and important people, when traveling overland, were commonly transported in sedan chairs carried by bearers, rather than in wheeled vehicles. This was at least partly explained by road conditions. It is thought that it was from China (or East Asia in general) that sedan chair (a.k.a. "palanquin") designs were introduced into Western Europe in the 17th century. However, wheeled carts for one or two passengers, pushed (rather than pulled, like a proper rikshaw) by a human servant, were attested as well.

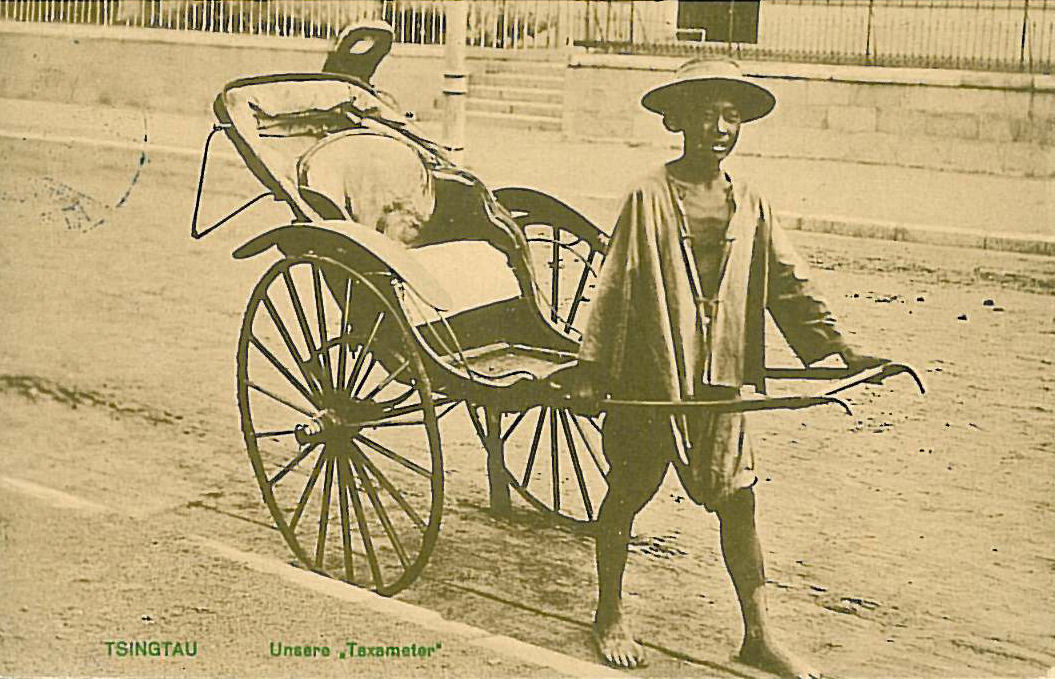
Rickshaw and driver in Qingdao, c. 1914

In the 19th century, the wheelbarrow was the most popular transportation for commoners. In the spring of 1873, the French merchant Menard introduced the rickshaw from Japan. The original name is "Jinrikisha", meaning "man-power-vehicle" in Japanese. Most of the rickshaws were owned by foreign investors at the beginning, but in around the 1900s, rickshaws were owned mostly by Chinese companies. The official name for rickshaw is "renliche", meaning "man-power-vehicle" in Chinese, but it is more commonly called "dongyangche", meaning "east-foreign-vehicle", or "huangbaoche" in Shanghai, meaning "yellow carriage for rent".

Rickshaw transportation was an important element in urban development in 20th-century China as a mode of transportation, source of employment, and facilitator of migration for workers. According to author David Strand:

Sixty thousand men took as many as a half million fares a day in a city of slightly more than one million. Sociologist Li Jinghan estimated that one out of six males in the city between the ages of sixteen and fifty was a puller. Rickshaw men and their dependents made up almost 20 percent of Beijing's population.

Most manual rickshaws – seen by many Maoists as a symbol of oppression of the working class – were eliminated in China after the founding of the People's Republic of China in 1949.

===== Shanghai =====
Shanghai's rickshaw industry began in 1874 with 1,000 rickshaws imported from Japan. By 1914 there were 9,718 vehicles. The pullers were a large group of the city's working poor: 100,000 men pulled rickshaws by the early 1940s, up from 62,000 in the mid-1920s.

In contrast to coolies in Beijing, those in Shanghai mostly come from rural areas outside the city. With the destitution of their land, they poured into the city with their family. As the number of coolies rose up sharply, however, the number of rickshaws remained at 20,000 in Shanghai. Except for private coolies, those for public work had to take turns, and thus their average income diminished to $9 per month. Therefore, many coolies worked in the factory and ran the rickshaw after work. However, many coolies were optimistic about life. They were satisfied with their income and dreamed of purchasing their own rickshaws and sending their kids to schools. Due to this low income, many coolies would not give customers a clear idea of the standard price and thus charge higher at any chance they had. In response to this phenomenon, hotels would provide the distance to various streets and the price charged.

==== Hong Kong ====
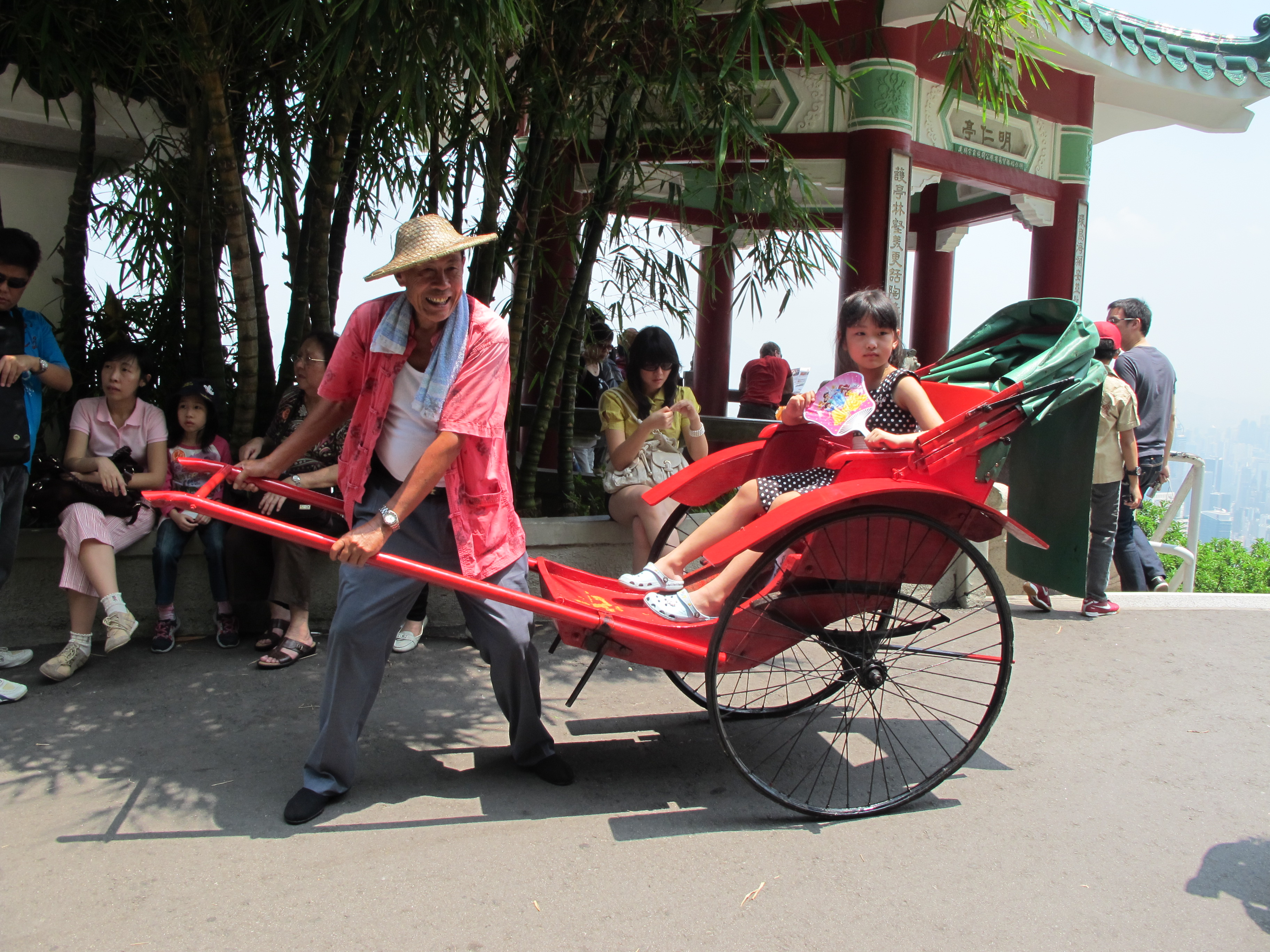
Outside the Lion Pavilion Lookout in 2011 on The Peak, Hong Kong, can find this last licensed rickshaw ride in this ex-British colony.

Rickshaws were first imported to Hong Kong from Japan in 1880. They were a popular form of transport for many years, peaking at more than 3,000 in the 1920s. However, their popularity waned after World War II. No new licenses for rickshaws have been issued since 1975, and only a few old men—three as of 2017—still hold a license. It was reported that only one of them still offered rickshaw rides on The Peak, mainly for tourists, however, he retired in 2020.

==== India ====
Around 1880, rickshaws appeared in India, first in Simla. At the turn of the century, it was introduced in Kolkata (Calcutta), India, and in 1914 was a conveyance for hire.

===== Service availability =====
Though most cities offer auto rickshaw service, hand-pulled rickshaws do exist in some areas, such as Kolkata, "the last bastion of human powered tana rickshaws". (Note: Several major streets have been closed to rickshaw traffic since 1972, and in 1982 the city seized over 12,000 rickshaws and destroyed them. In 1992, it was estimated that over 30,000 rickshaws were operating in the city, all but 6,000 of them illegally, lacking a license (no new licenses have been issued since 1945). The large majority of rickshaw pullers rent their rickshaws for a few dollars per shift. They live cheaply in hostels, trying to save money to send home. (Eide, 1993) Each dera, a mixture of a garage, repair shop, and dormitory, has a sardar that manages it. Pullers often pay around 100 rupees (around $2.50 United States dollars) per month to live in a dera. Hindu and Muslim pullers often share housing. Some pullers sleep in the streets in their rickshaws. As of 2008, many of the Kolkata rickshaw pullers originate from Bihar, considered to be one of the poorest states in India.) According to Trillin, most Kolkata rickshaws serve people "just a notch above poor" who tend to travel short distances. However, in a recent article by Hyrapiet and Greiner, the authors found that rickshaws also transport middle-class residents who use their services out of convenience and for short-distance trips to the local marketplace. Rickshaws are used to transport goods, shoppers, and school children. (Note: Trillin added that pullers told him that children enrolled in schools were the "steadiest" customers. Many middle-class families contract with rickshaw pullers to transport their children; a rickshaw puller who transports children becomes a "family retainer".) They are also used as a "24-hour ambulance service." Also, according to Hyrapiet and Greiner, rickshaw pullers have acted as peer-educators for the Calcutta Samaritans, providing critical information on HIV/AIDS because of their access to marginalized groups within Kolkata's red light districts.

Rickshaws are the most effective means of transportation through the flooded streets of the monsoon season. When Kolkata floods, rickshaw business increases and prices rise. (Note: A Kolkata writer told Trillin, "When it rains, even the governor takes rickshaws.")

The pullers live a life of poverty, and many sleep under rickshaws. Rudrangshu Mukerjee, an academic, stated many people's ambivalent feelings about riding a rickshaw: he does not use them himself but questions "whether we have the right to take away their livelihood.".

Motor vehicles are banned in the Eco-Sensitive Zone area of Matheran, India, a tourist hill station near Mumbai, so man-pulled rickshaws are still one of the major forms of transport there.

===== Legislation =====
The government of M. Karunanidhi banned hand-pulled rickshaws in the state of Tamil Nandu in the year 1973, replacing them with the pedal variety.

In August 2005, the Communist government of West Bengal announced plans to completely ban pulled rickshaws, resulting in protests and strikes by the pullers. In 2006, the chief minister of West Bengal, Buddhadeb Bhattacharya, announced that pulled rickshaws would be banned and that rickshaw pullers would be rehabilitated. (Note: Calvin Trillin of National Geographic stated in a 2008 article that the city government has not decided how rickshaw drivers would be rehabilitated, nor has it settled on a date regarding when the government would decide. Trillin added that many high West Bengal officials made statements saying that rickshaws would be banned from 1976 to 2008.)

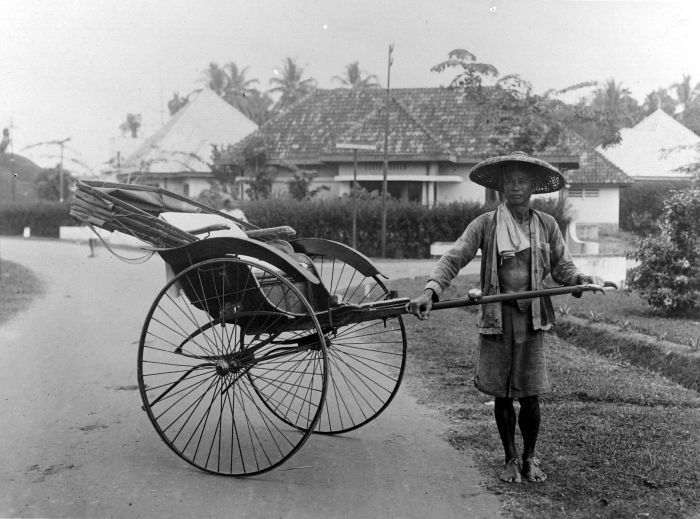
A Chinese man posing next to his rickshaw, Medan, Indonesia, 1936

In August 2025, the Supreme Court of India officially banned pulled rickshaws.

==== Indonesia ====
Pulled rickshaws used to be in Indonesia a long time ago. Nowadays, they are replaced by Delman (the horse-drawn carriage) and Becak (cycle rickshaw/pedicab).

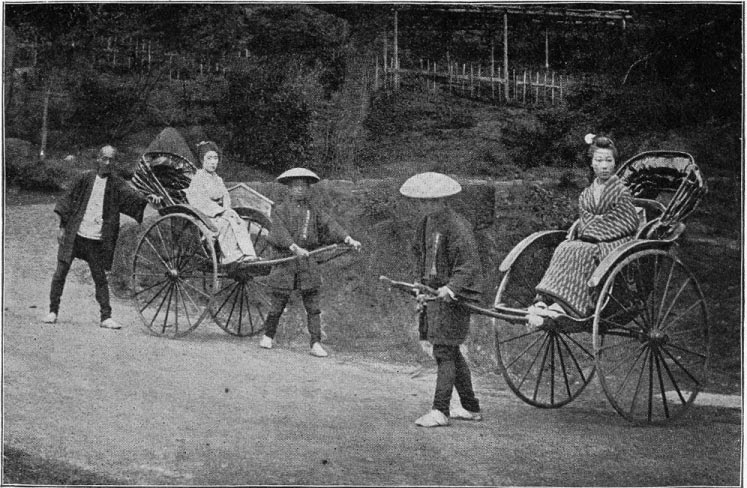
Japanese pulled rickshaws, c. 1897

==== Japan ====
There are several theories about the invention of the rickshaw. Japan historian Seidensticker wrote of the theories:

Though the origins of the rickshaw are not entirely clear, they seem to be Japanese, and of Tokyo specifically. The most widely accepted theory offers the name of three inventors, and gives 1869 as the date of invention.

Starting in 1870, the Tokyo government issued permission for Izumi Yosuke, Takayama Kosuke, and Suzuki Tokujiro to build and sell rickshaws. By 1872, they became the main mode of transportation in Japan, with about 40,000 rickshaws in service.

The rickshaw's popularity in Japan declined by the 1930s with the advent of automated forms of transportation, like automobiles and trains. After World War II, when gasoline and automobiles were scarce, they made a temporary comeback. The rickshaw tradition has stayed alive in Kyoto and Tokyo's geisha districts only for tourists as well as in other tourist places. The tradition completely disappeared once, but a few people revived jinrikisha (human-powered rickshaws) for tourists in the 1970s-1980s, and the rickshaws became popular as a tourism resource in the 2000s. The modern rickshaw men are a kind of tourist guide, who take their clients to some tourist spots and explain about them. Many of them are part-time working students and athletes who like running or exchanging cultures.

==== Malaysia ====
Rickshaws were a common mode of transport in urban areas of Malaysia in the 19th and early 20th centuries until gradually replaced by cycle rickshaws.

==== Pakistan ====
Pulled and cycle rickshaws (qinqi) have been banned in Pakistan since April 1960. Prior to the introduction of auto rickshaws in cities, horse-drawn carriages (tongas) were a main source of public transportation.

==== Philippines ====
The pulled rickshaw never gained acceptance in the Philippines. Americans tried to introduce it to Manila in the early 20th century, but it was strongly opposed by local Filipinos who viewed it as an undignified mode of transport that turned humans into "beasts". The main mode of public and private transportation in the Philippines from the 18th to the early 20th centuries was the kalesa, a two-wheeled horse-drawn carriage.

==== Singapore ====
Singapore had received its first rickshaws in 1880, and soon after they were prolific, making a "noticeable change in the traffic on Singapore's streets." Bullock carts and gharries were used prior to the introduction of rickshaws.

Many of the poorest individuals in Singapore in the late nineteenth century were poor, unskilled people of Chinese ancestry. Sometimes called coolies, the hardworking men found pulling rickshaws was a new means of employment. Rickshaw pullers experienced "very poor" living conditions, poverty, and long hours of hard work. Income remained unchanged from 1876 to 1926, about $.60 per day. (Note: 80% of rickshaw pullers were addicted to opium and many gambled and purchased the services of whores. These activities locked them into a state of poverty, but the remaining group of pullers might be able to improve their lot over time and "strike into new lines of business as the opportunities arose". Rickshaw pullers could become repairers or owners of rickshaws or bicycles.)

Rickshaws' popularity increased into the 20th century. There were approximately 50,000 rickshaws in 1920, and that number doubled by 1930. In or after the 1920s a union was formed, called the Rickshaw Association, to protect the welfare of rickshaw workers.

=== North America ===
==== United States ====
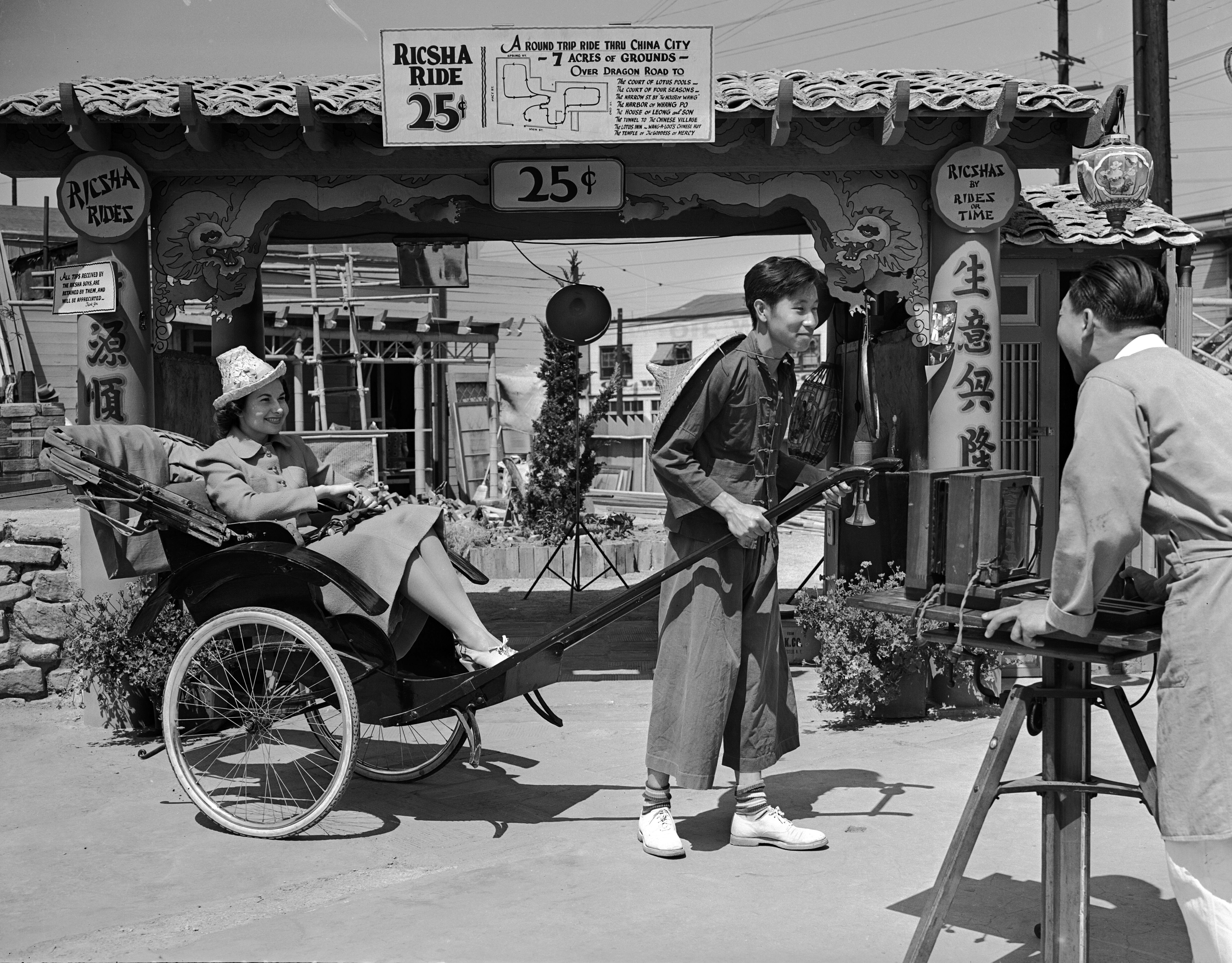
A tourist "Ricsha" ride in Chinatown, Los Angeles, 1938

From A History of the Los Angeles City Market (1930-1950), pulled rickshaws were operated in Los Angeles by high school teenagers during that time period.

==== Canada ====
Foot-driven rickshaws have enjoyed several decades of popularity in Halifax, Nova Scotia; in addition to providing tours of the historic waterfront, rickshaws are also occasionally used for transportation by local residents. The city is home to the oldest rickshaw company in Canada.

Rickshaws are a popular mode of transportation in downtown Ottawa, Ontario, providing tours of the historical Byward Market in the summer. Ottawa's rickshaws stay true to the traditional foot-driven rickshaw model, but feature modern sound-systems.

== Books, films, television, music and modern art ==
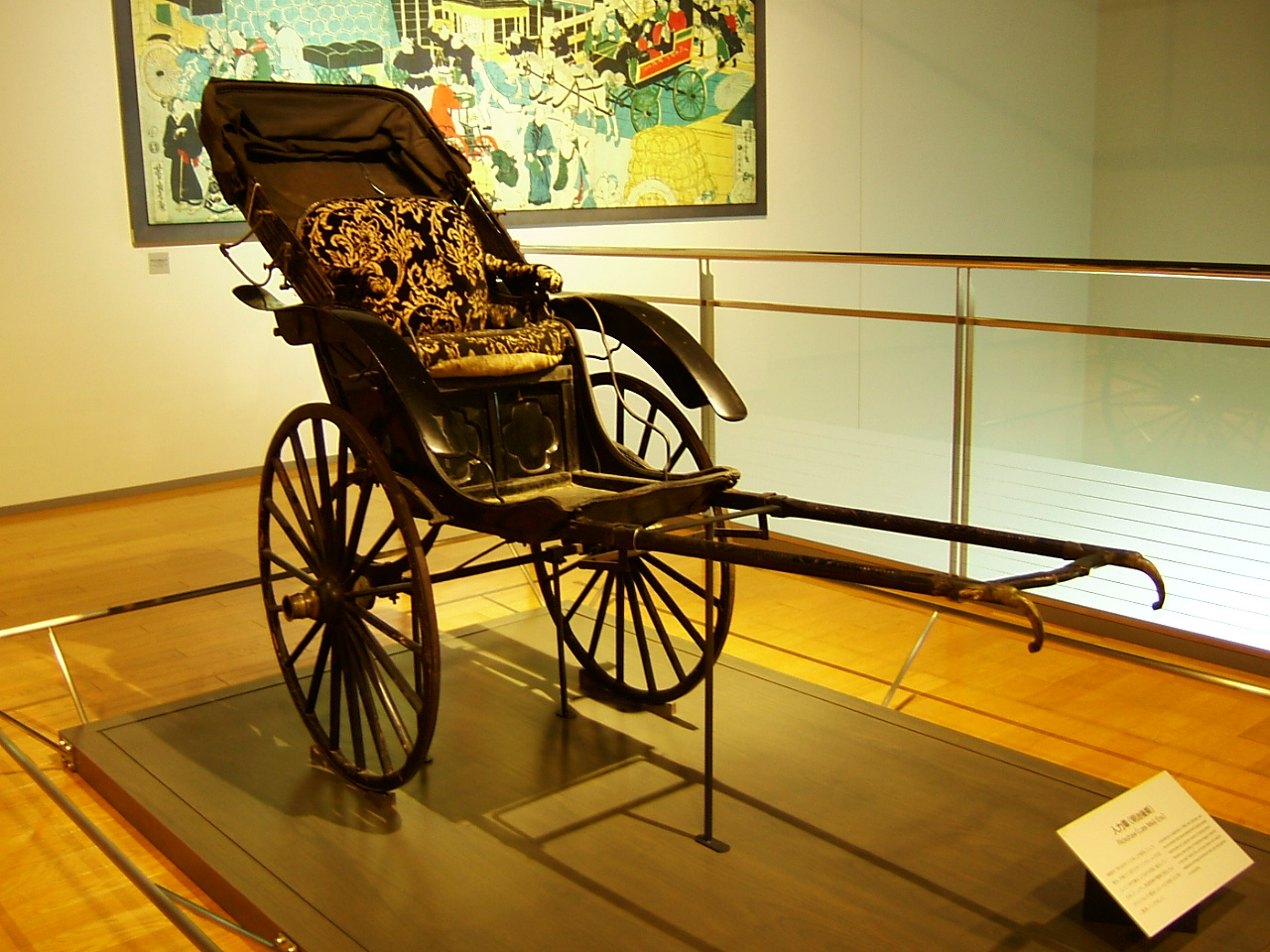
Rickshaw in a museum in Japan

- An early Rudyard Kipling story has the title The Phantom Rickshaw (1885). In it, a young Englishman has a romance aboard a ship bound for India. He ends the affair and becomes engaged to another woman, causing his original love to die of a broken heart. After that, on excursions around the city of Simla, he frequently sees the ghost of the deceased driving around in her yellow-panelled rickshaw, though nobody else seems to notice the phenomenon.
- The 1936 novel Rickshaw Boy is a novel by the Chinese author Lao She about the life of a fictional Beijing rickshaw man. The English version, Rickshaw Boy, became a U.S. bestseller in 1945. It was an unauthorized translation that added a happy ending to the story. In 1982, the original version was made into a film of the same title.
- In the 1940s, Eddy Howard recorded a song called The Rickety Rickshaw Man.
- The 1958 Japanese movie Muhomatsu no issho (Rickshaw Man) by Hiroshi Inagaki tells the story of Matsugoro, a rickshaw man who becomes a surrogate father to the child of a recently widowed woman.
- The 1953 Bollywood film Do Bigha Zameen, directed by Bimal Roy, describes the fate of an impoverished farmer who becomes a rickshaw puller in Kolkata.
- In the 1992 film City of Joy (whose title refers to Kolkata), Om Puri plays a rickshaw puller, revealing the economic and emotional hardship that these underpaid workers face on a day-to-day basis.
- In Pearl S. Buck's 1931 novel The Good Earth, hero Wang Lung leaves his land to travel southward during a drought. He ends up in the city of Kiangsu (Jiangsu), where he becomes a rickshaw puller in order to support his family.
- In the 1998 Seinfeld episode "The Bookstore", Kramer and Newman decide to start a rickshaw business with homeless people being trained to carry passengers.

== See also ==
- Kalesa

=== Rickshaws ===
- Electric rickshaw
- Auto rickshaw
- Cycle rickshaw
- Rickshaw
- Rickshaw art

=== Other human powered transport ===
- Human-powered transport
- Boda-boda (bicycle taxi)
- Carriage
- Litter
- Handcar
- Taiwanese push car railways
