= Lao She =

Chinese writer (1899–1966)

- 舒慶春
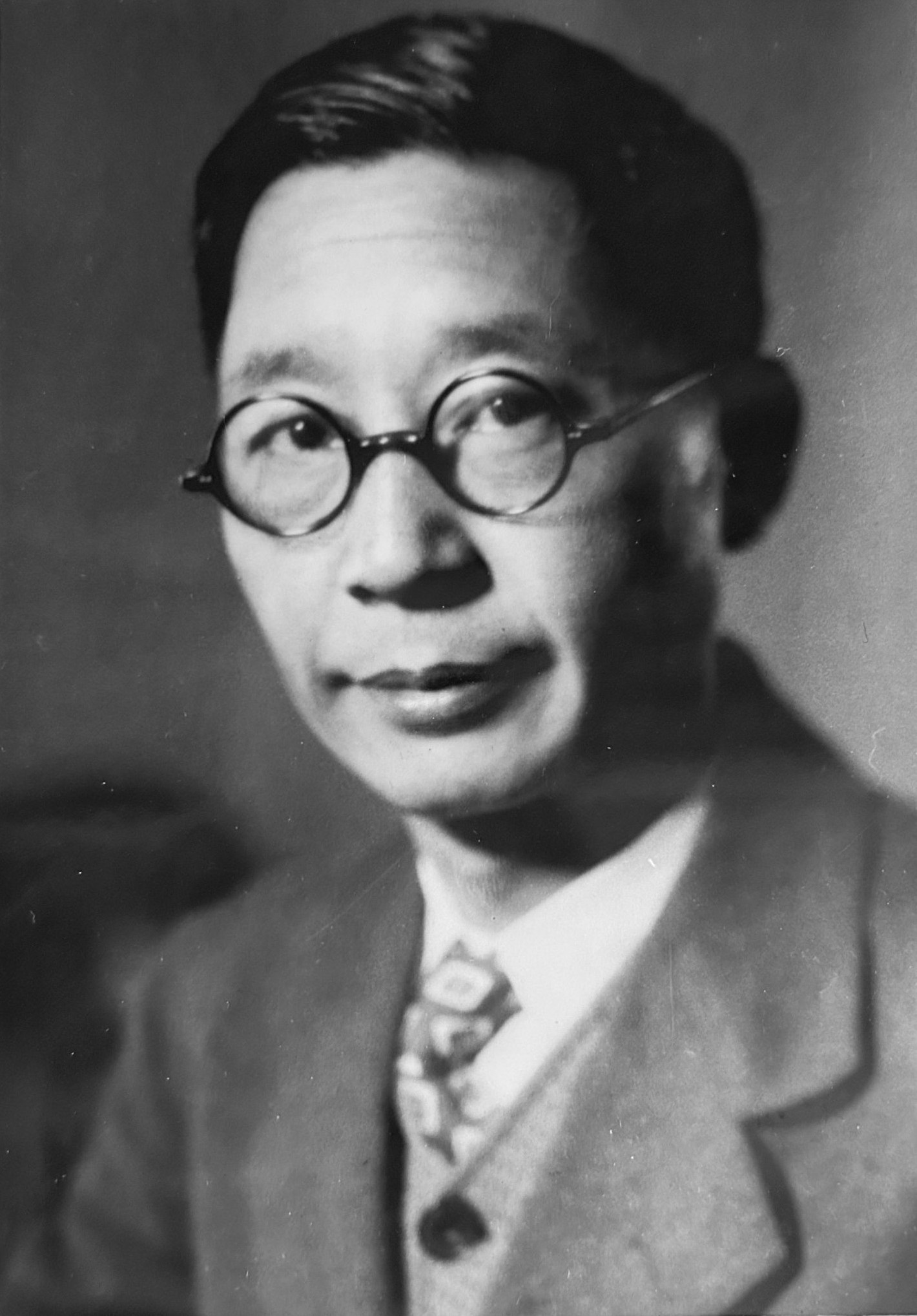
- Born: Shu Qingchun; 3 February 1899; Beijing, Qing Empire
- Died: 24 August 1966 (aged 67); Beijing, People's Republic of China
- Resting place: Babaoshan Revolutionary Cemetery, Beijing
- Education: Beijing Normal University
- Occupations: Novelist, dramatist
- Spouse: Hu Jieqing
- Children: 4
- Writing career
- Pen name: Lao She
- Language: Chinese
- Notable works: Rickshaw Boy; Teahouse

Chinese name
- Chinese: 老舍
Transcriptions
Standard Mandarin
- Hanyu Pinyin: Lǎo Shě
- Wade–Giles: Lao^{3} Shê^{3}
- IPA: [làʊ ʂɤ̀]
Yue: Cantonese
- Yale Romanization: Lóuh Se
- Jyutping: Lou5 Se3
- IPA: [lɔw˩˧ sɛ˧]

Shu Qingchun
- Traditional Chinese: 舒慶春
- Simplified Chinese: 舒庆春
Transcriptions
Standard Mandarin
- Hanyu Pinyin: Shū Qìngchūn
- Wade–Giles: Shu^{1} Ch'ing^{4}-ch'un^{1}

Shu Sheyu
- Chinese: 舒舍予
Transcriptions
Standard Mandarin
- Hanyu Pinyin: Shū Shěyǔ
- Wade–Giles: Shu^{1} Shê^{3}-yü^{3}

Shu Qingchun (Chinese: 舒慶春; 3 February 1899 – 24 August 1966), known by his pen name Lao She, was a Chinese writer of Manchu ethnicity, known for his vivid portrayal of urban life and his colorful use of the Beijing dialect, such as in the novel Rickshaw Boy and the play Teahouse. During the Cultural Revolution, he was persecuted and either drowned himself or was murdered.

== Biography ==
=== Early life ===
Lao She was born Shu Qingchun on 3 February 1899 in Beijing, to a poor Manchu family of the Šumuru clan belonging to the Plain Red Banner. His father, who was a guard soldier, died in a street battle with the Eight-Nation Alliance Forces in the course of the Boxer Rebellion events in 1901. "During my childhood," Lao She later recalled, "I didn't need to hear stories about evil ogres eating children and so forth; the foreign devils my mother told me about were more barbaric and cruel than any fairy tale ogre with a huge mouth and great fangs. And fairy tales are only fairy tales, whereas my mother's stories were 100 percent factual, and they directly affected our whole family." In 1913, he was admitted to the Beijing Normal Third High School (now Beijing Third High School), but had to leave after several months because of financial difficulties. In the same year, he was accepted to Beijing Normal University, from which he graduated in 1918.

=== Career ===
Between 1918 and 1924, Lao She was involved as administrator and faculty member at a number of primary and secondary schools in Beijing and Tianjin. He was highly influenced by the May Fourth Movement (1919). He stated, "The May Fourth Movement gave me a new spirit and a new literary language. I am grateful to the May Fourth Movement, as it allowed me to become a writer."

He went on to serve as lecturer in the Chinese section of the School of Oriental Studies (now the School of Oriental and African Studies) at the University of London from 1924 to 1929, living in Notting Hill for most of that period. During his time in London, he absorbed a great deal of English literature (especially Dickens, whom he adored) and began his own writing. His later novel Mr Ma and Son, about a Chinese father and his son in London, drew on these experiences. Up until that time, he had signed his works with his courtesy name She Yu (舍予). In his first novel "Old Zhang's Philosophy" (老张的哲学 Lao Zhang de Zhexue), first published on Fiction Monthly, he first adopted the pen name Lao She.

In the summer of 1929, he left Britain for Singapore, teaching at the Chinese High School. Between his return to China in the spring of 1930 until 1937, he taught at several universities, including Cheeloo University until 1934, and Shandong University (Qingdao).

Lao She was a major popularizer of humor in China, especially through his novels, his short stories and essays for journals like Lin Yutang's "The Analects Fortnightly" (論語半月刊, Lunyu Banyuekan, est. 1932), and his stage plays and other performing arts, notably xiangsheng.

On 27 March 1938, The All-China Resistance Association of Writers and Artists was established with Lao She as its leader. The purpose of this organization was to unite cultural workers against the Japanese, and Lao She was a respected novelist who had remained neutral during the ideological discussions between various literary groups in the preceding years.

In March 1946, Lao She travelled to the United States on a two-year cultural grant sponsored by the State Department, lecturing and overseeing the translation of several of his novels, including The Yellow Storm (1951) and his last novel, The Drum Singers (1952; its Chinese version was not published until 1980). He stayed in the US from 1946 until December 1949. During Lao She's traveling, his friend, Pearl S. Buck, and her husband, had served as sponsors and they helped Lao She live in the U.S. After the People's Republic of China was established, Lao She rejected Buck's advice to stay in America and came back to China. Rickshaw Boy was translated by Buck in the early 1940s. This action helped Rickshaw Boy become a best seller book in America.

=== Marriage and family ===
In 1930, Hu Jieqing was studying at Beijing Normal University. Hu's mother was afraid that she would delay marriage and having children because of her studies. Linguist Luo Changpei was acquainted with Hu Jieqing's brothers. Once, Lao She went to Hu's house to play, and Hu Mu asked him to play hide and seek. At this time, Lao She happened to be returning from London, and he had written works, so Luo Changpei introduced Lao She to Hu Mu. After learning about Lao She's talent and character, Hu Mu was extremely happy and privately appointed Lao She the son-in-law of Chenglong. Luo discussed together a detailed plan for Lao She and Hu Jieqing to meet. In the winter of 1930, Lao She returned to Peiping. Under Luo's arrangement, Lao She was dragged by friends everywhere to eat, and there was always Hu Jieqing at the dinner table. After frequent meetings, Hu and Lao developed affection.

In the summer of 1931 Hu Jieqing graduated. The two held a wedding in the same year. Two weeks after the marriage, Lao She brought his wife to Jinan and continued to teach at the university, while Hu Jieqing taught in a middle school.

The couple had four children, Shu Ji, Shu Yi, Shu Yu and Shu Li. The first child of the two was born in 1933 in Jinan, a girl named Shu Ji; son Shu Yi was born two years later, and after another two years, she gave birth to his third child in Chongqing, named Shu Yu, with the youngest girl Shu Li born in 1945.

=== Death ===
Like numerous other intellectuals in China, Lao She experienced mistreatment when the Cultural Revolution began in 1966. Condemned as a counterrevolutionary, he was paraded and struggled by the Red Guards through the streets and beaten publicly at the door steps of the Temple of Confucius in Beijing. According to the official record, this abuse left Lao She greatly humiliated both mentally and physically, and he committed suicide by drowning himself in Beijing's Taiping Lake on 24 August 1966. Leo Ou-fan Lee mentioned the possibility that Lao She was murdered. However, no reliable information has emerged to verify definitively the actual circumstances of Lao's death. His relatives were accused of implication in his "crimes", but rescued his manuscripts after his death, hiding them in coal piles and a chimney and moving them from house to house.

== Works ==
Lao She's first novel, The Philosophy of Lao Zhang was written in London (1926) and modeled on Dickens' Nicholas Nickleby, but is set among students in Beijing. His second novel, Zhao Ziyue (1927) is set in the same Beijing milieu, but tells the story of a 26-year-old college student's quest for the trappings of fame in a corrupt bureaucracy. Both "The Philosophy of Lao Zhang" and "Zhao Ziyue" were Lao She's novels which expressed the native Peking lives and memories. He also wrote Crescent Moon (Chinese: 月牙儿; pinyin: Yuè Yár), written in the early stage of his creative life. It depicts the miserable life of a mother and daughter and their deterioration into prostitution.

In 1938, Lao She rewrote Classics for Girls to change its pre-modern characterisation of women's moral duties with messages urging women's contributions in the Second Sino-Japanese War.

=== Mr Ma and Son ===
Mr. Ma and Son showed another writing style for Lao She. He described Mr. Ma and his son's life in London Chinatown, showing the poor situation of Chinese people in London. These were praised as reflecting Chinese students' experiences. Lao She used funny words to show cruel social truths. From "Mr. Ma and Son", Lao She pointed the stereotype included appearances and spirits and he hoped to get rid of these dirty impressions.

=== Cat Country ===
Cat Country is a satirical fable, sometimes seen as a Chinese science fiction novel, published in 1932 as a thinly veiled observation on China. Lao She wrote it from the perspective of a visitor to the planet Mars. The visitor encountered an ancient civilisation populated by cat-people. The civilisation had long passed its glorious peak and had undergone prolonged stagnation. The visitor observed the various responses of its citizens to the innovations by other cultures. Lao She wrote Cat Country in direct response to Japan's invasion of China (Manchuria in 1931 and Shanghai in 1932). Paradoxically, Cat Country has been considered as an artistic failure by the author himself.

=== Rickshaw Boy ===
His novel Rickshaw Boy (also known in the West as Camel Xiangzi or Rickshaw) was published in 1936. It describes the tragic life of a rickshaw-puller in Beijing of the 1920s, and revealed the tragedy of lower classes at that time through the narration of the rickshaw boy's story. Xiangzi is a stereotype of a social phenomenon: a peasant coming to the city and then turning to an urban tramp, experiencing spiritual crises of all kinds. Not only a problem of particular historical period, it is an all-pervasive one that persists throughout Chinese history. Reading the novel today reveals more about the contemporary Chinese society than the text itself. It is considered to be a classic of modern Chinese literature and a contribution to the genre of world literature about laborers. Moreover, it was translated into English and sold in the USA. In 1945, an unauthorized translation that added a bowdlerized happy ending to the story was published and sold. In 1982, the original version was made into a film of the same title.

=== Teahouse ===
Teahouse is a play in three acts, set in a teahouse called "Yu Tai" in Beijing from 1898 until the eve of the 1949 revolution. First published in 1957, the play is a social and cultural commentary on the problems, culture, and changes within China during the early twentieth century. It has been translated into many different languages.

=== Promotion of Baihua (National Language) ===
Lao She advocated the use of Baihua or plain language in written Chinese. Baihua evolved a new language from classic Chinese during the May Fourth Movement. As the All-China League of Resistance Writers leader, he found he needed to abandon the use of classical Chinese for a more accessible modern style. Lao She was an early user of Baihua, and other writers and artists also adopted Baihua. Modern written Chinese is largely in the plain Baihua style.

=== Treasure Boat ===
"Treasure Boat" was written by Lao She in 1961. It was the only children's opera he wrote.

== Article style ==
Lao She's writing was known for its humor and irony, being simple but deep. He wrote humorous, satiric novels and short stories and, after the onset of the Sino-Japanese War (1937–45), patriotic and propagandistic plays and novels.

== Legacy ==
After the end of the Cultural Revolution, Lao She was posthumously "rehabilitated" in 1978 and his works were republished. Several of his stories have been made into films, including This Life of Mine (1950, dir. by Shi Hui), Dragon Beard Ditch (1952, dir. by Xian Qun), Rickshaw Boy (1982, dir. by Ling Zifeng), The Teahouse (1982, dir. by Xie Tian), The Crescent Moon (1986, dir. by Huo Zhuang), The Drum Singers (1987, dir. by Tian Zhuangzhuang), and The Divorce (1992, dir. by Wang Hao-wei). Tian Zhuangzhuang's adaptation of The Drum Singers, also known as Street Players, was mostly shot on location in Sichuan. Some of Lao She's plays have also been staged in the recent past, including Beneath the Red Banner in 2000 in Shanghai, and Dragon's Beard Ditch in 2009 in Beijing as part of the celebration of the writer's 110th birthday.

Lao She's former home in Beijing is preserved as the Lao She Memorial Hall, opened to the public as a museum of the writer's work and life in 1999. Originally purchased in 1950, when it was 10 Fengsheng Lane, Naicifu, the address of the traditional courtyard house is now 19 Fengfu Lane. It is close to Wangfujing, in Dongcheng District. Lao She lived there until his death 16 years later. The courtyard contains persimmon trees planted by the writer. His wife called the house 'Red Persimmon Courtyard'.

The Lao She Literary Award has been given every two to three years starting in the year 2000. It is sponsored by the Lao She Literature Fund and can only be bestowed on Beijing writers.

The Laoshe Tea House, a tourist attraction in Beijing that opened in 1988 and features regular performances of traditional music, is named after Lao She, but features primarily tourist-oriented attractions.

== Three-self principles ==
As a philosophy, the three-self principles survived in China. The People's Republic of China expelled all foreign missionaries in 1950, and in 1954 forced the Protestant churches to merge into a single body, the Three-Self Patriotic Movement of Protestant Churches in China, and break ties with foreign money, influence, and leadership. Critics charged that the movement was actually designed to train leaders in patriotism and to facilitate communication between the government and the Christian community. In 1966, as the Cultural Revolution began, public Christian worship was banned, and the Three-self Movement was disbanded. It was reorganized in 1980. Its main role is to articulate new government policies regarding religion. On a more positive note, it has helped foster the sense that the contemporary Chinese Protestant church is an indigenous body and no longer a branch of a foreign institution.

Lao She's work revealed the language, the joys, and the pains of the common people of China. He believed his country and its Christianity needed to be sinicized and not dependent upon the foreigner for funds and direction.

== Selected works in translation ==
=== Fiction ===
- The Two Mas. Translated by Kenny K. Huang & David Finkelstein. Hong Kong: Joint Publ. Co., 1984.
- Mr Ma and Son: Two Chinese in London. Translated by William Dolby. Edinburgh: W. Dolby, 1987. Republished – Melbourne: Penguin Group, 2013.
- Cat Country, a Satirical Novel of China in the 1930s.(貓城記 / Mao cheng ji) Translated by William A. Lyell. Columbus: Ohio State University Press, 1970. Reprinted - Melbourne: Penguin Group, 2013.
- The Quest for Love of Lao Lee. Translated by Helena Kuo. New York: Reynal & Hitchcock, 1948.
- Heavensent. Translated by Xiong Deni. London: 1951. Reprinted - Hong Kong: Joint Publ. Co., 1986.
- Rickshaw Boy. (駱駝祥子 /Luo tuo Xiangzi) Translated by Evan King and Illustrated by Cyrus Leroy Baldridge. New York: Reynal & Hitchcock, 1945. Unauthorized.
- Rickshaw. (駱駝祥子 /Luo tuo Xiangzi) Translated by Jean James. Honolulu: University Press of Hawaii, 1979. ISBN 0824806166
- Camel Xiangzi (駱駝祥子 /Luo tuo Xiangzi) Translated by Xiaoqing Shi. Bloomington; Beijing: Indiana University Press; Foreign Languages Press, 1981. ISBN 0253312965
- Rickshaw Boy: A Novel. Translated by Howard Goldblatt New York: Harper Perennial Modern Chinese Classics, 2010. ISBN 9780061436925.
- 駱駝祥子 [Camel Xiangzi] (in English and Chinese). Trans. Shi Xiaojing (中英對照版 [Chinese-English Bilingual] ed.). Hong Kong: Chinese University Press. 2005. ISBN 962-996-197-0.
- The Yellow Storm (also known as Four Generations Under One Roof). New York: Harcourt, Brace, 1951. Translated by Ida Pruitt.
- The Drum Singers. Translated by Helena Kuo. New York: Harcourt, Brace, 1952. Reprinted - Hong Kong: Joint Publ. Co., 1987.
- Blades of Grass the Stories of Lao She. Translated by William A. Lyell, Sarah Wei-ming Chen and Howard Goldblatt. Honolulu: University of Hawai'i Press, 1999. ISBN 058525009X
- Crescent Moon and Other Stories. (月牙兒 Yue ya er) Beijing, China: Chinese Literature, 1985. ISBN 0835113345
- Beneath the Red Banner. Translated by Don J. Cohn. Beijing: Chinese Literature, 1982.

=== Plays ===
- Dragon Beard Ditch: A Play in Three Acts. Peking: Foreign Languages Press, 1956.
- Teahouse: A Play in Three Acts. Translated by John Howard-Gibbon. Beijing: Foreign Languages Press, 1980; rpr Hong Kong, Chinese University Press. ISBN 0835113493

== Portrait ==
- Lao She. A Portrait by Kong Kai Ming at Portrait Gallery of Chinese Writers (Hong Kong Baptist University Library).
