= Electric rickshaw =

Electric passenger vehicle

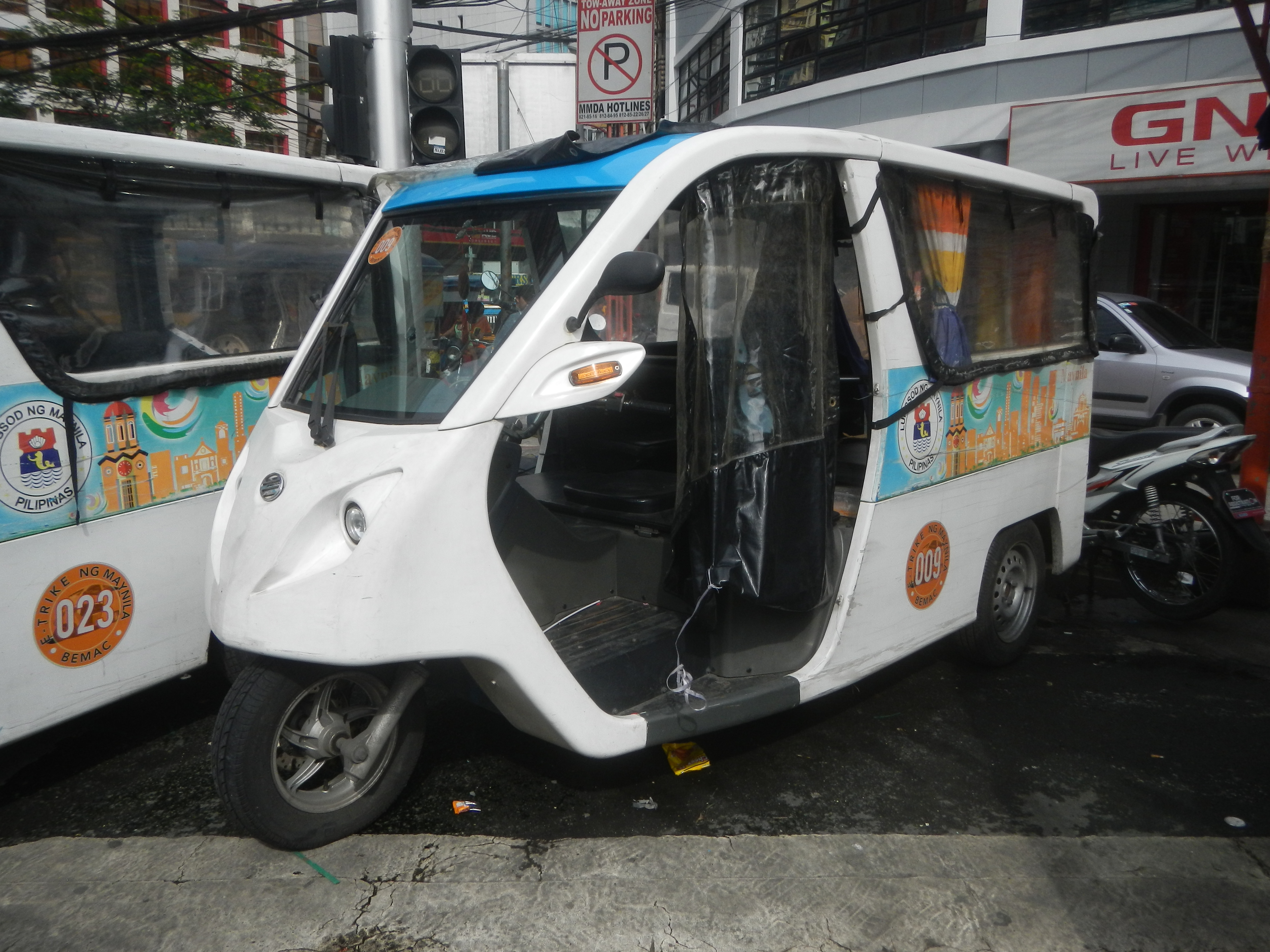
An electric rickshaw in Binondo District, Manila, Philippines

An electric rickshaw (also known as electric tuk-tuk, Toto, e-rickshaw, and e-tricycle) is a small three-wheeled vehicle powered by an electric motor. These small electric vehicles do not require petroleum fuel like auto rickshaws but still offer greater mobility than traditional cycle rickshaws and pulled rickshaws. This has led to their popularity and use expanding in some cities since 2008. Electric rickshaws are primarily manufactured in India, Bangladesh, Nepal, and China.

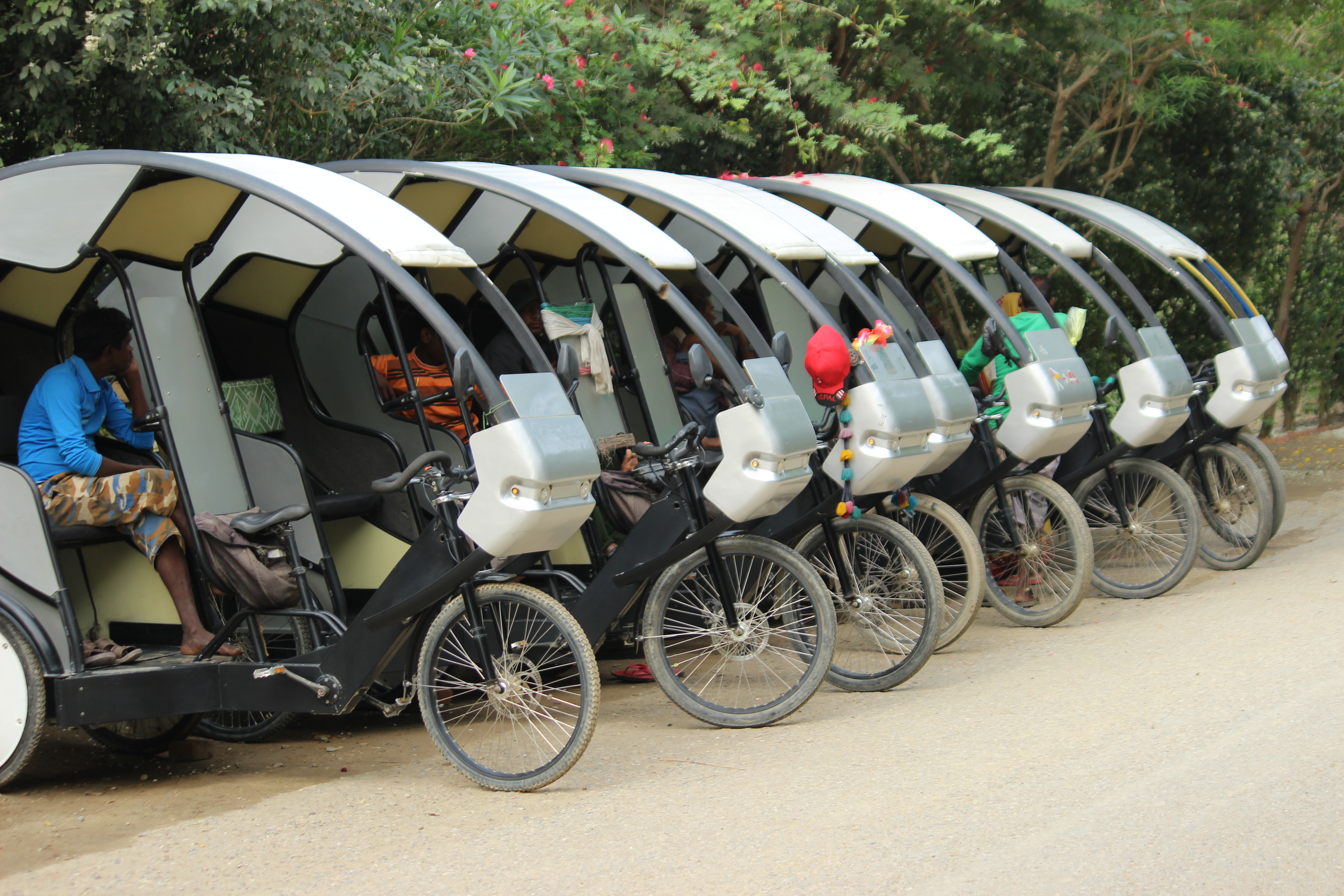
Electric rickshaws in Lumbini, Nepal

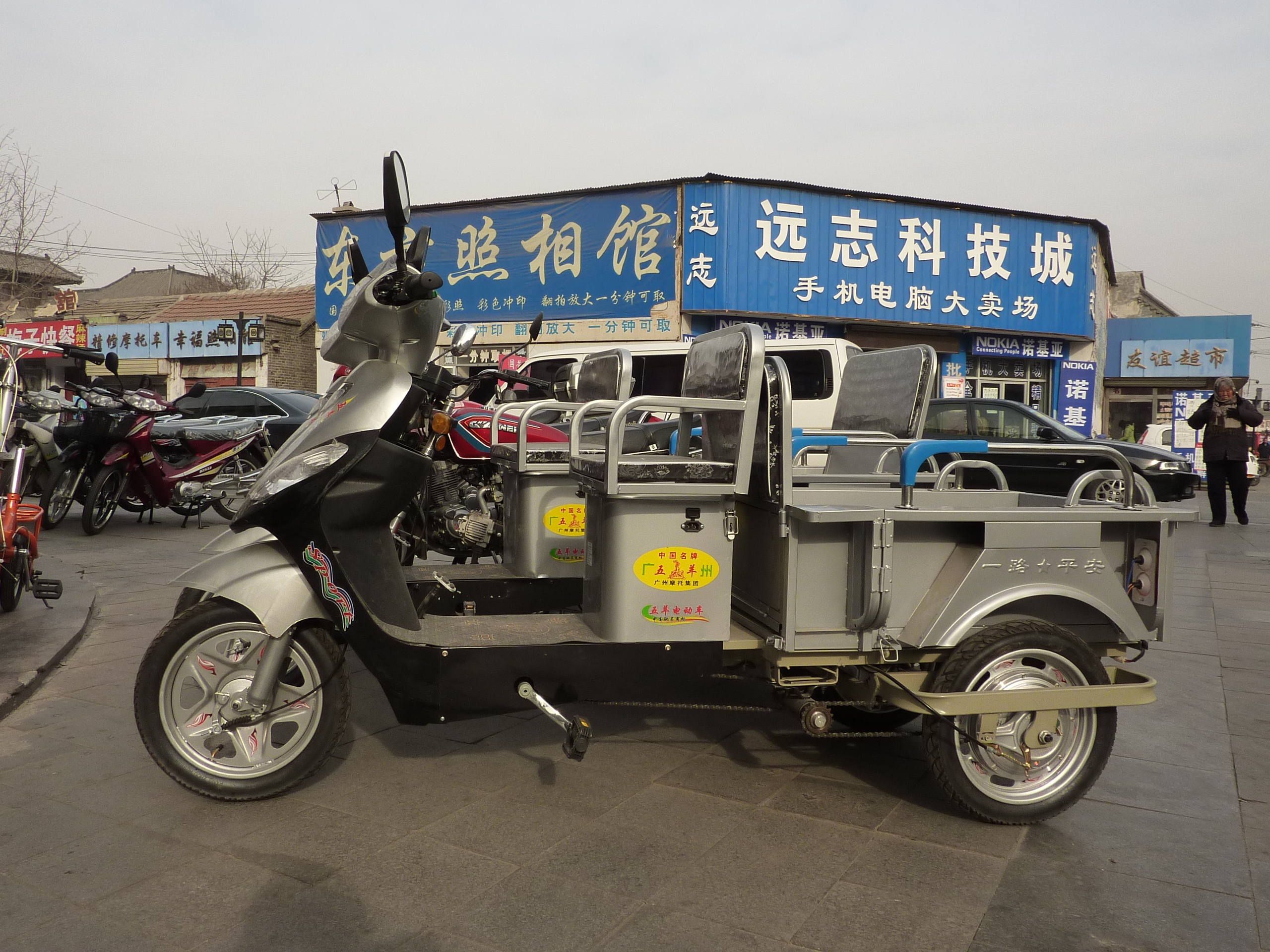
Qufu - Gogobike - P1060306

== Development of the E-Rickshaw market in India ==
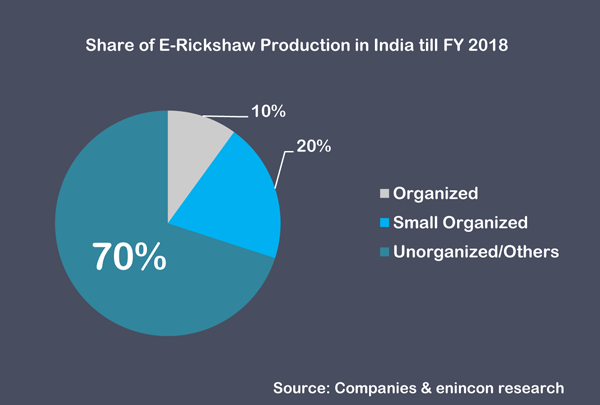
Share of E-Rickshaw Production in India till FY 2018

=== Share of production ===
During 2020–23, the registration of e-rickshaws saw a significant increase, with around 300,000 vehicles registration in 2022–23, up from 78,700 in 2020–21. Although a host of unorganised producers dominate this segment, established manufacturers have also identified their growth opportunities and are expected to enter into the segment.

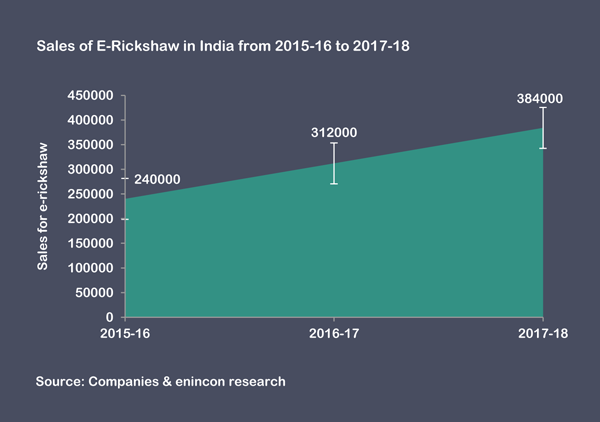
Sales of E-Rickshaw in India from 2015–16 to 2017-18

=== Sales trends ===
In the early 2010s, E-Rickshaws were introduced to several Indian and Chinese cities, however, they sold poorly at first and were initially uncommon. Driven by a push for more environmentally friendly methods of transportation, the electric rickshaw has surged in popularity, and takes up an increasingly larger share of urban transport in these areas, especially as already established companies introduce their rickshaw products to the market.

== Design and construction ==
Electric rickshaws usually have a mild steel tubular chassis, consisting of three wheels with a Differential mechanism sending power to the rear wheels. The motor is a brushless DC motor, with power outputs generally ranging from 650 to 1,400 watts (0.87 to 1.88 hp). The electrical system used in Indian versions is 48V and in Bangladesh is 60V. In China, the most popular body design is made of very thin iron or aluminium sheets. Bodies made of fiberglass are also popular for their strength and durability resulting in low maintenance requirements.

The vehicle's batteries are typically lead acid with a lifespan of 6 to 12 months. Deep-cycle batteries designed for electric vehicles are rarely used.

== Types ==
=== Load carriers ===
The load-carrying versions of these rickshaws differ in their upper body, load-carrying capacity, motor power, controllers, and other structural aspects. At times, the motor power is also increased to carry loads up to 500–1,000 kg.

=== Solar ===
There are two types of solar vehicles:

- Directly solar-powered — fitted with Solar panels. A directly solar-powered rickshaw is an electric auto rickshaw driven solely by one or more electric motors, powered by solar panels mounted on the vehicle and capable of operating while the vehicle is in motion. Theoretically, solar panels could provide power directly to the motor(s) without the need for batteries, but in reality, this would be an improbable design choice for a rickshaw, given its intended purpose.
- Indirectly solar-charged — In practice, the term solar rickshaw is most commonly used to describe battery-electric rickshaws whose batteries are indirectly solar-charged (i.e., independently of the vehicle) before use. This is usually facilitated by removing batteries in need of charging from the vehicle and exchanging them for batteries that have already been charged. Alternatively, batteries can be charged in situ while the vehicle is parked, although this may limit daytime usage. The same battery replacement and in-situ charging methods are also used for non-Solar batteries and vehicles.

== Popularity ==
Electric rickshaws are most popular in Asia, especially in China, India, Bangladesh, and Nepal. Low-cost Chinese models were often the first electric rickshaws to become popular in those countries. In addition, China, Japan, India, and European countries (Switzerland, France, and Germany) have researched and developed electric tricycles for commercial transport and are attempting to enter the growing market in Asia.

=== Bangladesh ===
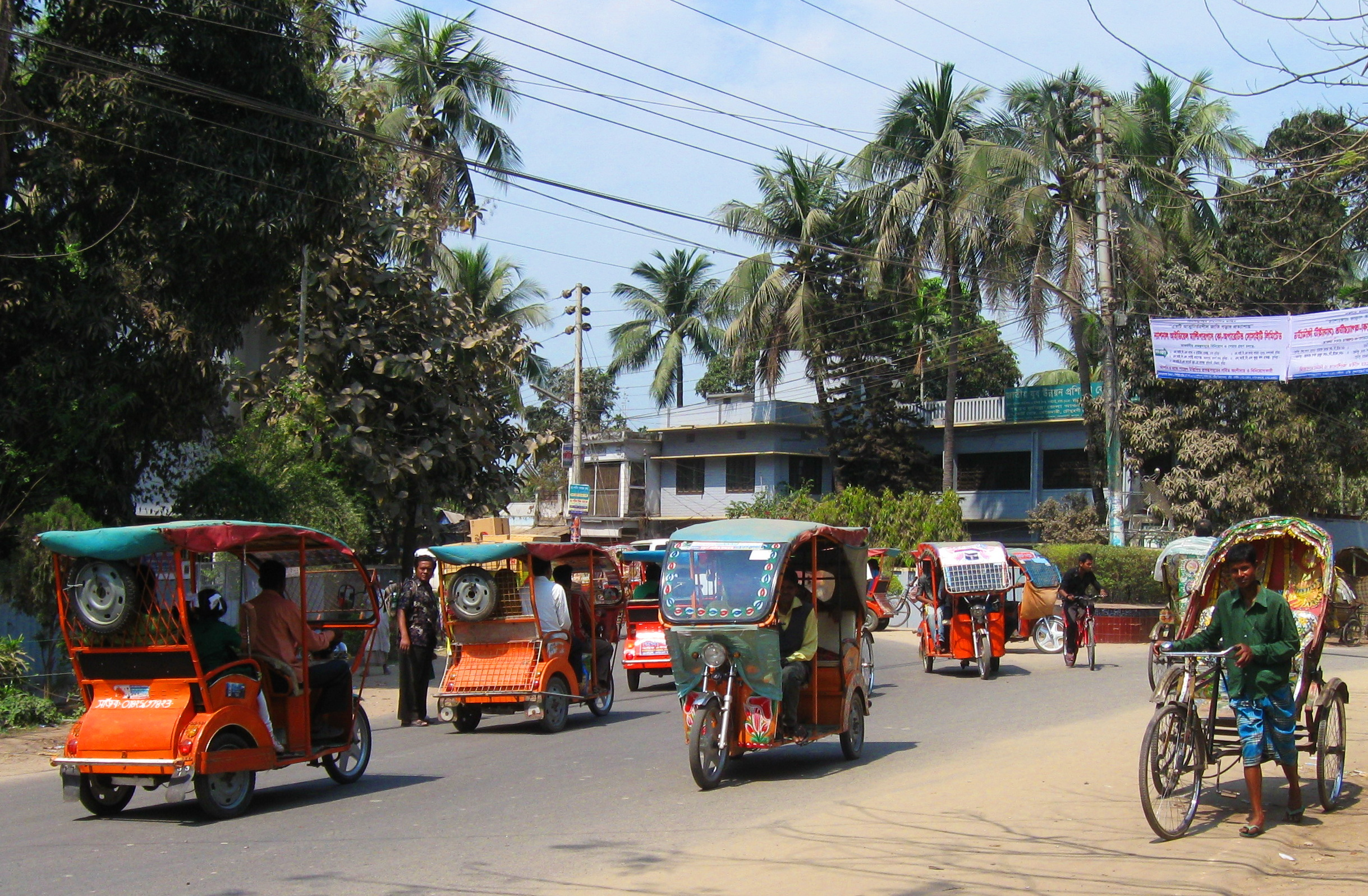
Customized electric rickshaws in Comilla, Bangladesh

Bangladesh began importing electric rickshaws in 2004, from China. In May 2011, the government banned the import and assembly of the vehicles and ordered operating vehicles to be scrapped because most are recharged through illegal connections. Importers said they would challenge the ban in court. In 2021, the government again announced a ban, citing road safety.

=== China ===
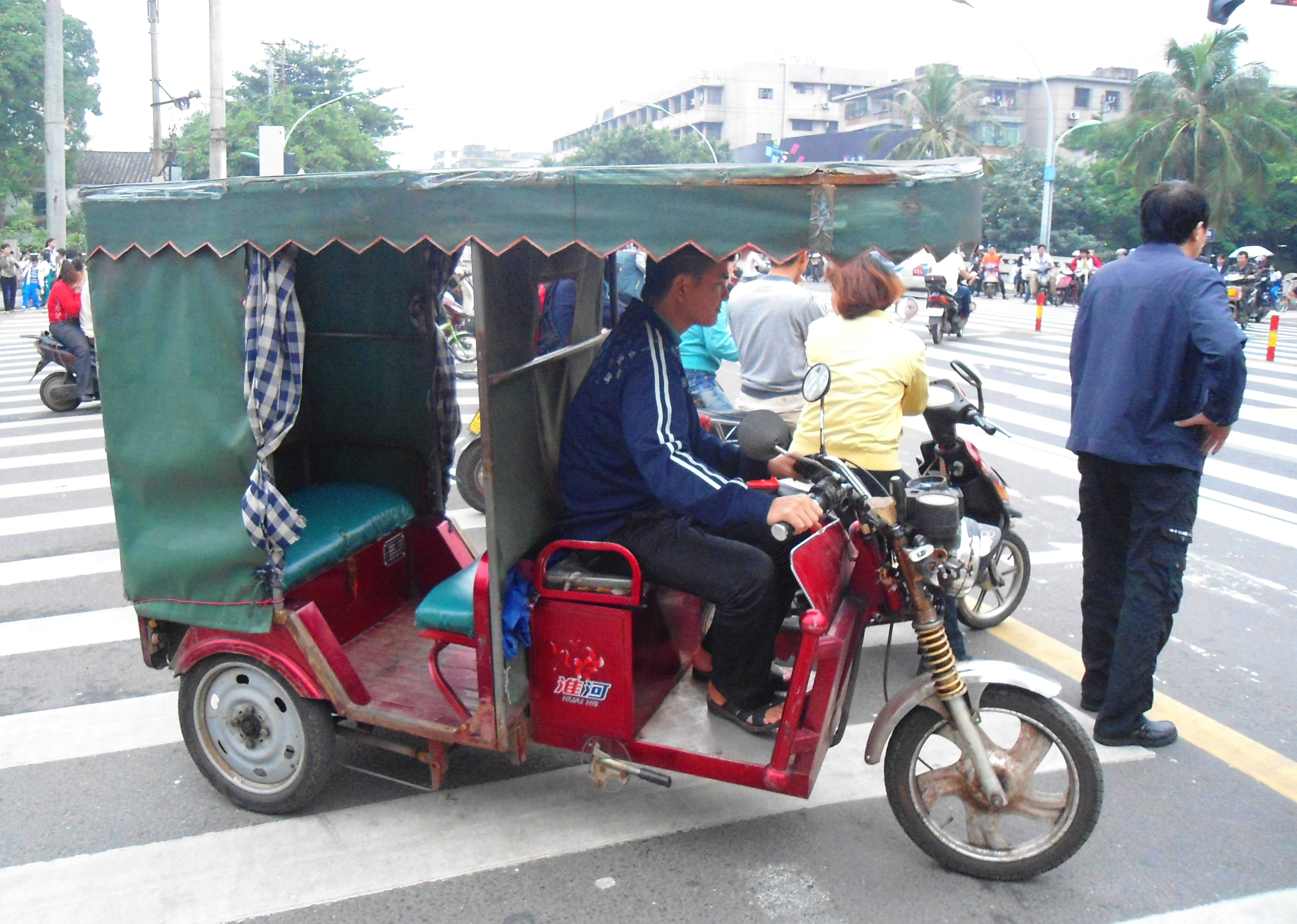
An electric rickshaw in Haikou, Hainan, China

China is the world's largest manufacturer of electric rickshaws; largely due to low labour costs, high production rates, and government incentives encouraging foreign trade, they import a large number daily. There are hundreds of electric rickshaw manufacturers and thousands of parts producers. Their main market is within small towns or cities with insufficient public transport.

=== Nepal ===
Electric Rickshaws, "Citi Safaris," are becoming popular among the Nepalese Community. They have been in use for several regions in Nepal, including Dharan and Biratnagar. This cheap method of transportation has revolutionized the transport sector in Nepal. Being eco-friendly, it has also helped Nepal reduce pollution to some extent.

=== India ===
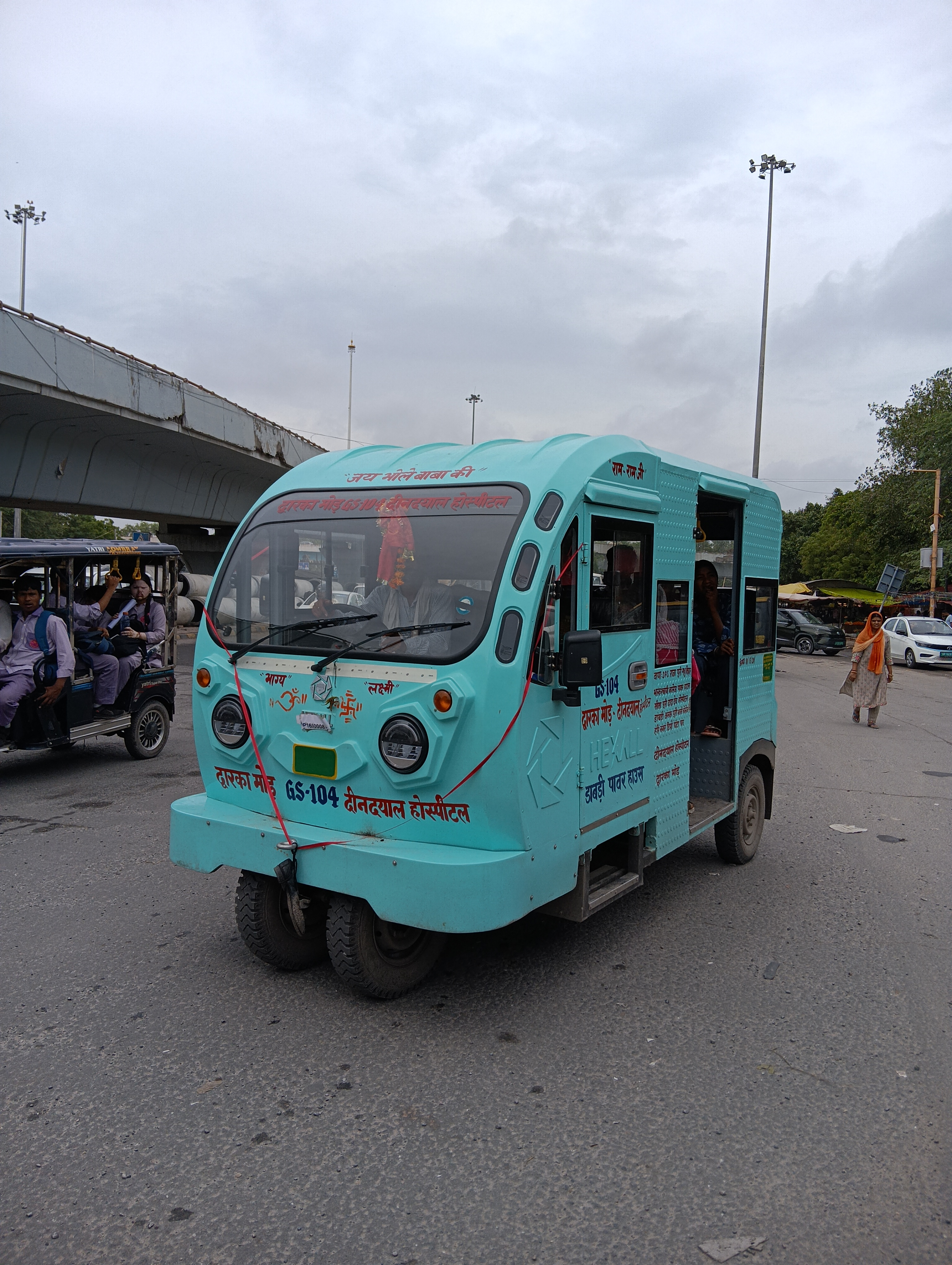
Tempo-styled electric rickshaw with dual front wheels

One of the first attempts to design electric rickshaws was by the Nimbkar Agricultural Research Institute in the late 1990s. They also filed the first patent in India for electric rickshaws

Today, e-rickshaws play a major role in providing livelihoods to people in India, as their low cost and high efficiency make them common on Indian streets. Government policies have threatened the e-rickshaw and banned its use in the capital city Delhi, However, these measures did not lead to a national ban, and e-rickshaws were legalized in India in 2015. E-rickshaws are still rising in number and are widely used in Delhi and other parts of India. According to official government figures from April 2012, the number was over 100,000 in Delhi.

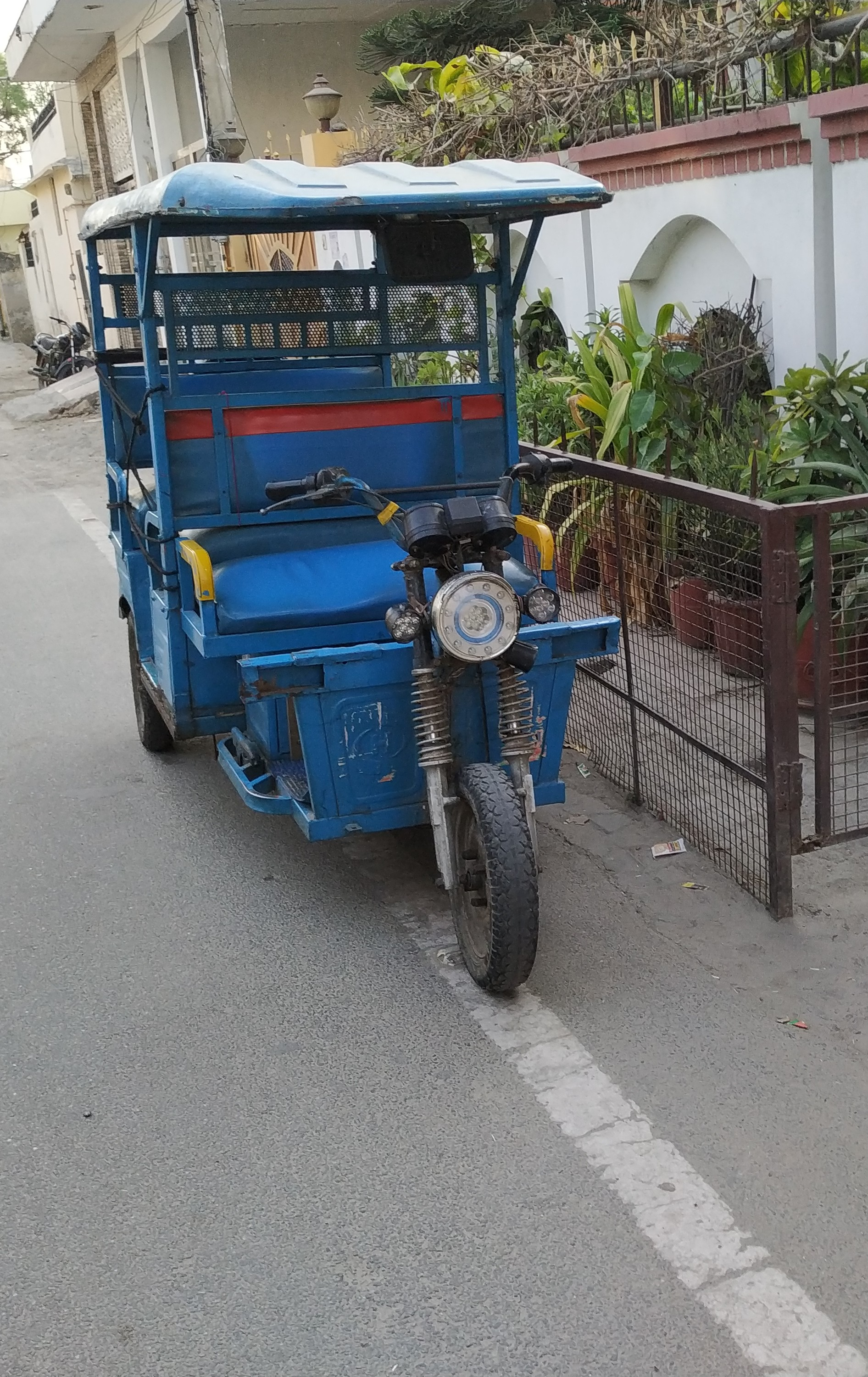
Electric rickshaw in Meerut, Uttar Pradesh, India

==== E-rickshaw law in India ====
Initially, e-rickshaws were not regulated by any central law in India. However, the Delhi High Court banned the running of e-rickshaws in Delhi on 31 July 2014 over safety concerns raised through public interest litigation. In a rally held for the regularization of e-rickshaws in Delhi, transport minister Nitin Gadkari said that municipal corporations would regularize e-rickshaws by registering them for a fee of just ₹100. After registering the e-rickshaw, corporations will have to issue identity cards to drivers so that they can earn their livelihoods easily." Once the policy was in place, the corporation, along with traffic police, would have determined the amount of the fine to be imposed for violation of the policy. However, the policy was never implemented. Certain states like Tripura have regulated the e-rickshaws through municipal bylaws or state legislation. In March 2015, the Indian Parliament passed an amendment to the Motor Vehicles (Amendment) Bill, 2015 legalizing e-rickshaws. By July 2015, battery rickshaws were available in many cities and were required to comply with registration number plates by R.T.O. with insurance.

=== Pakistan ===
Pakistan has an estimated fleet of 1 to 3 million three-wheeled vehicles, predominantly motorized rickshaws, with the government and industry increasingly prioritizing electrification. Sazgar Engineering Works Limited, a prominent Pakistani manufacturer, Sazgar, has been producing motorized rickshaws since 2005. In February 2024, it became the first company in the country to secure a license for manufacturing electric three-wheelers. As of early 2025, Sazgar commands approximately a 30% share of the rickshaw market in Pakistan, producing around 2,500 units monthly, including about 30 electric models, within a competitive field of roughly 40 rival companies. Electric vehicles currently account for only 0.16% of Pakistan's automotive market. However, under the nation's latest Electric Vehicle (EV) Policy, the government aims to increase this to 90% of new vehicle sales by 2040. In support of this target, the government issued production licenses to 57 companies in mid-February 2025, with the majority designated for manufacturing two- and three-wheeled vehicles.

== Potential market ==
The global electric rickshaw market was valued at approximately US$1.55 billion in 2023 and is expected to grow at a compound annual growth rate (CAGR) of 14.9% to reach US$4.11 billion by 2030.

== See also ==
- Neighborhood Electric Vehicle
- Squad Solar — solar roof microvan
