= Amon Miyamoto =

Japanese theatre director (born 1958)

Amon Miyamoto (宮本亞門; born January 4, 1958, in Tokyo) is a theater director. He has directed numerous productions in Japan and worldwide, including musicals, straight plays, opera, kabuki, and other art genres. In 2004, he became the first Japanese director to direct a musical on Broadway when he directed the revival of Pacific Overtures. That production received four Tony Award nominations.

Miyamoto made his directing debut with his original musical I Got Merman, winning the National Performing Arts Festival Award. He is a recipient of the Matsuyo Akimoto Award of the Asahi Performing Arts Awards. He served as the inaugural artistic director of Kanagawa Arts Theater (KAAT) from 2010 to 2014.

Amon made his North American opera-directing debut in 2007 with the US premiere of Tan Dun's Tea: A Mirror of Soul at the Santa Fe Opera. His recent works in New York include The Temple of the Golden Pavilion at Lincoln Center Festival. His European opera credits include: The Magic Flute (Landestheater Linz in Austria), Le Pavillon d’Or (Opéra national du Rhin in France), Parsifal, and Madame Butterfly (Semperoper in Germany) which is also planned for the San Francisco Opera in 2023 and the Royal Danish Theatre in Copenhagen in 2024. He directed the pre-Broadway world premiere of The Karate Kid: The Musical on May 25, 2022, in St. Louis.

== Biography ==
=== Career highlights ===
- 1987: Made a debut as a director with the original musical I GOT MERMAN, and received the Agency for Cultural Affairs' National Arts Festival Award the next year
- 1998: Made a film directing debut with BEAT which was officially invited to the Venice International Film Festival
- 2001: Directed I GOT MERMAN at The Rich Forum Theatre, Stamford, CT, USA
- 2004: Directed and choreographed a revival production of Pacific Overtures on Broadway, and became the first Asian director on Broadway
- 2004: Directed Into The Woods in Tokyo, Japan, for which he received the Matsuyo Akimoto Award of the Asahi Performing Arts Awards
- 2005: Pacific Overtures was nominated under four categories for the Tony Awards
- 2007: Directed the U.S. premiere of TEA: A Mirror of Soul at The Santa Fe Opera, NM, USA
- 2008: Directed the world premiere of the original musical Up In The Air at The Kennedy Center, WA, USA
- 2010: Inaugurated as the first artistic director of the Kanagawa Arts Theatre (KAAT)
- 2010: Directed the West End production of The Fantasticks, London, UK
- 2011: Directed The Temple of The Golden Pavilion, a play based on a novel of the same title by Yukio Mishima, adapted by Serge Lamothe, as the inaugural production of the Kanagawa Arts Theatre
- 2011: The Temple of The Golden Pavilion was invited to Lincoln Center Festival in NY, USA
- 2013: Directed the Canadian premiere of TEA: A Mirror of Soul at the Vancouver Opera, Canada
- 2013: Directed Mozart's opera “DIE ZAUBERFLÖTE” (The Magic Flute) at The Landestheater Linz, Austria
- 2016: Directed the off-Broadway production of DRUM TAO's DRUM HEART in New York, NY, USA
- 2016: Directed the special cultural program The Land of the Rising Sun at the World Form on Sport and Culture, an official kickoff event toward Tokyo 2020 Olympics & Paralympics games and more.
- 2016: Directed YUGEN: The Hidden Beauty of Japan, the world's first 3D live theater featuring the Japanese Noh theater in Singapore.
- 2017: Directed a reading performance of Fanatic Artist Hokusai, an original play about the later life of Hokusai, at the British Museum's Great Court.
- 2018: Directed the opera “The Temple of The Golden Pavilion“, based on the novel by Yukio Mishima, at Opéra national du Rhin in Strasbourg and Mulhouse, France.
- 2018: Directed YUGEN: The Hidden Beauty of Japan at the Royal Opera of Versailles. The special one night performance was attended by President Emmanuel Macron of France and Naruhito, Crown Prince of Japan.

== Early life and education ==
Miyamoto was born to parents who ran a café named “Sugawa” (now “Sabou Erika”) across from the Shinbashi Enbujō, one of the most prominent kabuki theaters in Tokyo. As a child, he paid frequent visits to the Shimbashi Enbujō as well as movie theaters, Kabuki-za, and other theaters under the influence of his mother who was a former dancer of the Shochiku Revue Company. In kindergarten, he began to study (Nihon Buyō) at Fujima School of Japanese Dance where Nakamura Kanzaburō XVIII was one of his peers. Around that time, he became absorbed in Hollywood films and began to learn about musicals. When he was in elementary school, he began practicing Tea ceremony. He was brought up right in the middle of Hanamachi, a Japanese courtesan and geisha district.

While in high school, he was cast as the leading role in the school's theater club production of Godspell in which he made his acting debut. This musical received positive reviews and was featured in the Kinema Shunpo magazine. He proceeded to attend Tamagawa University, where he majored in Theater in the College of Arts. In the middle of his senior year, he was cast as a dancer in the musical Pippin.

== Early career ==
He debuted as a dancer in 1980. He performed in musicals such as Hair, Annie Get Your Gun, and Chicago, and devoted his time to dance and choreography. He visited New York repeatedly, and studied in London for two years beginning in 1985.

He made his directing debut with his original musical I Got Merman in 1987. The following year, he received the Agency for Cultural Affairs' Performing Arts Festival Award.

== International career highlights ==
Film “BEAT”
In 1998, Miyamoto made his film-directing debut with BEAT which was officially invited to the 55th Venice International Film Festival's International Film Critics' Week.

Musical “Pacific Overtures”
In 2000, Miyamoto directed the musical Pacific Overtures at The New National Theater, Tokyo. During the run of the production, Stephen Sondheim, the composer of the musical, was in Tokyo participating in an award ceremony of the Praemium Imperiale ("World Culture Prize in Memory of His Imperial Highness Prince Takamatsu"), and John Weidman, the lyricist of the musical, was also in Tokyo for a musical produced by Shiki Company. Both of them came to see Miyamoto's production of Pacific Overtures. Sondheim, whom Miyamoto worships, spoke very highly of the production and Miyamoto’s direction during his speech at the ceremony of the Praemium Imperiale, instead of taking about his own achievements. In 2002, Miyamoto’s Pacific Overtures was presented at the Lincoln Center Festival, and then at The Kennedy Center in Washington D.C. In 2004, Miyamoto made his Broadway debut with Pacific Overtures as the first Asian director on Broadway. In 2005, the production was nominated for Tony Awards under four categories.

Musical “I Got Merman”
In 2001, Amon was in New York City to direct I Got Merman at the Rich Forum Theater, Stamford Center in Connecticut. The production opened only a few days after the September 11 attacks. On the morning of the terrorist attacks, Miyamoto was at the Grand Central Terminal, heading to the rehearsal. Even though the show did open, Miyamoto felt extremely stressed and left for Bangkok, Thailand two weeks later to escape from the chaos. On his first day in Bangkok, he was severely injured in a car accident but miraculously escaped death.

Contemporary Opera “TEA: A Mirror of Soul”
In 2007, upon composer Tan Dun’s recommendation, Miyamoto directed the first opera style production of TEA: A Mirror of Soul, premiered at the Santa Fe Opera in the U.S. The revival production was presented at Opera Company of Philadelphia (conducted by Tan Dun himself) in the U.S. in 2010 and at the Vancouver Opera in Canada in 2013.

Musical “Up in the Air”
Up in the Air is a musical based on “Boonah, the Tree-Climbing Frog,” a book by Tsutomu Minakami. Henry Krieger, the composer of Dreamgirls wrote the music, and the production had its world premiere at The Kennedy Center in Washington D.C. in 2008.

Musical “The Fantasticks”
He made his West End debut with The Fantasticks in June 2010.

Play “The Temple of the Golden Pavilion”
Inaugurated as the Artistic Director of Kanagawa Arts Theatre in April 2010, he directed The Temple of the Golden Pavilion, a play based on the novel by Yukio Mishima, as the venue's inaugural production in January 2011. In July, it was presented at the Lincoln Center Festival as Miyamoto's second production at the festival (following Pacific Overtures). Following the successful run in the U.S., the production was revived in Japan (Tokyo and Osaka) in January 2012.

Opera “DIE ZAUBERFLÖTE” (The Magic Flute)
In 2013, he directed Mozart's opera DIE ZAUBERFLÖTE (The Magic Flute) at the Landestheater Linz in Austria.

Japanese Noh Theatre x 3D Live Theatre “YUGEN The Hidden Beauty of Japan”
In 2016, he created and directed YUGEN: The Hidden Beauty of Japan, the world's first 3D live theater featuring Japanese Noh theater at the Singapore River Nights Festival.

Opera “The Temple of The Golden Pavilion”
In 2018, he directed the opera The Temple of The Golden Pavilion, based on the novel by Yukio Mishima, at Opéra national du Rhin in Strasbourg and Mulhouse, France.

Japanese Noh Theatre x 3D Live Theatre “YUGEN The Hidden Beauty of Japan”
In 2018, he directed YUGEN: The Hidden Beauty of Japan at the Royal Opera of Versailles. The special one night performance was attended by President Emmanuel Macron of France and Naruhito, Crown Prince of Japan.

== Selected works ==
=== Opera / Operetta ===
TITLE	STAFF/ CAST
Opera: Mozart's “Le Nozze di Figaro” 2016.7 Tokyo Bunka Kaikan, Tokyo	Directed by Amon Miyamoto, Conducted by Sascha Goetzel, Set Design by Neil Patel, Produced by Tokyo Nikikai
Opera: Mozart's “DIE ZAUBERFLÖTE” (The Magic Flute) 2015.7 Tokyo Bunka Kaikan, Tokyo 2013.9 THE LANDESTHEATER LINZ, Austria (World Premiere)	Directed by Amon Miyamoto, Conducted by Dennis Russell Davies, Set Design by Boris Kudlichka, Costume Design by Masatomo Ota, Visual design by LUNAPARK
Opera: Tan Dun's “TEA: A MIRROR OF SOUL” 2013.5 Vancouver Opera, CANADA	Original Direction by Amon Miyamoto, Directed by PAUL PEERS, Music by Tan Dun, Book by Tan Dun and Xu Ying, Conducted by JONATHAN DARLINGTON, Set Design by Rumi Matsui, Costume Design by Masatomo Ota, Lighting Design by Drew Billiau, Starring: CHENYE YUAN, NANCY ALLEN LUNDY, ROGER HONEYWELL, KIRK EICHELBERGER, NING LIANG
Neo Opera: “Madame Butterfly X” 2012.11 KAAT (Kanagawa Arts Theatre), Kanagawa	Directed by Amon Miyamoto, Music by Giacomo Puccini
Opera: Mozart's “Le Nozze di Figaro” 2011.4 Tokyo Bunka Kaikan, Tokyo	Directed by Amon Miyamoto, Conducted by Dennis Russell Davies, Set Design by Neil Patel, Produced by Tokyo Nikikai
Opera: Mozart's “Le Nozze di Figaro” 2006.9 Bunkamura Orchard Hall, Tokyo	Directed by Amon Miyamoto, Conducted by Manfred Honeck, Set Design by Neil Patel, Produced by Tokyo Nikikai, Orchestra: Yomiuri Nippon Symphony Orchestra
Opera: Mozart's “Le Nozze di Figaro” 2002.2 Tokyo Bunka Kaikan, Tokyo	Directed by Amon Miyamoto, Conducted by Manfred Honeck, Set Design by Neil Patel, Produced by Tokyo Nikikai, Orchestra: Yomiuri Nippon Symphony Orchestra
Opera: Tan Dun's “TEA: A MIRROR OF SOUL” 2010.1 The Academy of Music, Opera Company of Philadelphia, Pennsylvania, US	Directed by Amon Miyamoto, Music by Tan Dun, Book by Tan Dun and Xu Ying, Conducted by Tan Dun, Set Design by Rumi Matsui, Costume Design by Masatomo Ota, Lighting Design by Drew Billiau, Produced by Opera Company of Philadelphia Starring: Kelly Kaduce, Haijing Fu, Roger Honeywell, Kirk Eichelberger, Nancy Maultsby
Opera: Tan Dun's “TEA: A MIRROR OF SOUL” 2007.7 The Santa Fe Opera, New Mexico, US (U.S. Premiere)	Directed by Amon Miyamoto, Conducted by Lawrence Renes, Set Design by Rumi Matsui, Costume Design by Masatomo Ota, Lighting Design by Rick Fisher Starring: Kelly Kaduce, Haijing Fu, Roger Honeywell, Christian van Horn, Nancy Maultsby
Opera: Verdi's “La Traviata” 2009.2 Tokyo Bunka Kaikan, Tokyo	Directed by Amon Miyamoto, Conducted by Antonello Allemandi, Set Design by Rumi Matsui, Costume Design by Shinjiro Asatsuki, Produced by Tokyo Nikikai, Orchestra: Tokyo Philharmonic
Opera: Mozart's “Così fan tutte” 2006.11 Nissey Theatre, Tokyo	Directed by Amon Miyamoto, Conducted by Pascal Verrot, Set Design by Neil Patel, Produced by Tokyo Nikikai, Orchestra: Tokyo Philharmonic
Opera: Mozart's “Don Giovanni” 2004.7 Tokyo Bunka Kaikan, Tokyo	Directed by Amon Miyamoto, Conducted by Pascal Verrot, Set Design by Neil Patel, Lighting Design by David Lander, Produced by Tokyo Nikikai, Orchestra: Tokyo Philharmonic
Operetta: Original “Pinocchio” 1990 Aoyama Enkei Theatre, Tokyo	Directed and Adapted by Amon Miyamoto
Operetta: Lehar's “The Merry Widow” 1989 Nagoya City Art and Creative Center	Directed, Choreographed, Lyrics Translated and libretto written by Amon Miyamoto
Opera: Donizetti's “L’elisir d’amore” 1988 Aoyama Theater, Tokyo	Directed by Amon Miyamoto

=== Straight Play ===
TITLE	STAFF/ CAST
"The Terrace of the Leper King" 2016.3.4-17 Akasaka ACT Theater, Tokyo	Written by Yukio Mishima, Directed by Amon Miyamoto
”iSAMU” a play based on the life of Isamu Noguchi 2013.8.30 Sunport Hall Takamatsu, Kagawa 2013.8.21-27 PARCO Theatre, Tokyo 2013.8.15-18 KAAT (Kanagawa Arts Theatre)	Directed by Amon Miyamoto
“Hoichi the Earless” 2013.4.13-21 KAAT (Kanagawa Arts Theatre)	Directed by Amon Miyamoto, Book by Lafcadio Hearn (Koizumi Yakumo)
”iSAMU” a play based on the life of Isamu Noguchi 2013.1.24-25 Sunport Hall Takamatsu, Kagawa	Directed by Amon Miyamoto
“Salome” 2012.5.31-6.17 New National Theatre, Tokyo	Directed by Amon Miyamoto, Book by Oscar Wilde, Costume by Yoji Yamamoto
KINKAKUJI “The Temple of the Golden Pavilion” 2014.4.5-19 Akasaka ACT Theater, Tokyo 2012.1.27-2.12 Akasaka ACT Theater, Tokyo 2012.1.19-22 Umeda Arts Theater, Osaka 2011.7.21-24 Lincoln Center Festival, Rose Theatre, NY (U.S. premiere) 2011.1.29-2.14 KAAT (Kanagawa Arts Theatre Opening Production)	Directed by Amon Miyamoto, Based on the novel by Yukio Mishima, Adapted for the stage by Serge Lamothe, Book by Chihiro Ito and Amon Miyamoto, Music by Yutaka Fukuoka, Choreographed by Shuji Onodera, Set Design by Boris Kudlichka
“MARY STUART” 2005 PARCO Theatre, Tokyo	Directed by Amon Miyamoto, Book by Dacia Maraini, Set Design by Rachel Hauck, Costume Design by Toshikazu Iwaya (DRESS CAMP)
“UNIDENTIFIED HUMAN REMAINS AND THE TRUE NATURE OF LOVE” 2000 PARCO Theatre, Tokyo, Theatre Drama City, Osaka 1993 PARCO Theatre, Tokyo	Directed by Amon Miyamoto, Book by Brad Fraser, Set Design by Tsukasa Nakagoshi, Lighting Design by Sonoyo Nishikawa
“CAMILLE” 1995 PARCO Theatre, Tokyo	Directed by Amon Miyamoto, Book by Pam Gems
“THE VORTEX” 1995 Benisan Pit Theatre, Tokyo	Directed by Amon Miyamoto, Book by Noël Coward
“MUCH ADO ABOUT NOTHING” 1989 The Globe Tokyo	Directed and Set Design by Amon Miyamoto, Book by William Shakespeare

=== Musical ===
TITLE	STAFF/ CAST
"IKIRU" 2018.10.8-28 TBS Akasaka ACT Theater, Tokyo	Directed and Co-Choreographed by Amon Miyamoto, Music by Jason Howland, Book and Lyrics by Chikae Takahashi
"A Funny Thing Happened on the Way to the Forum <Edo version>" 2017.3.4-28 Shimbashi Embujo, Tokyo 2017.4.2-25 Osaka Shochikuza, Osaka	Directed, Script Adapted and Lyrics Translated by Amon Miyamoto, Music and Lyrics by Stephen Sondheim, Book by Burt Shevelove and Larry Gelbart
“Priscilla, Queen of the Desert” 2016.12.8-29 Nissay Theatre, Tokyo	Directed by Amon Miyamoto
“TANUKI GOTEN” 2016.8.1-27 Shinbashi Embujo, Tokyo	Directed by Amon Miyamoto
“SWEENEY TODD” 2016.4.14-5.8, Tokyo Metropolitan Theatre 2016.5.13-15 Theater BRAVA!, Osaka 2016.5.20-22 The Aichi Arts Center, Nagoya	Directed and Choreographed by Amon Miyamoto, Music and Lyrics by Stephen Sondheim, Book by Hugh Wheeler
“THE WIZ -The Wonderful Wizard of Oz-” 2015.3.7-22 Tokyo International Forum Hall C, Tokyo 2015.4.4-5 Umeda Arts Theater, Osaka 2015.4.18-19 Aichi Arts Theater, Nagoya 2015.4.25-26 Canalcity Theater, Fukuoka	Directed by Amon Miyamoto, Original Work by Lyman Frank Baum "The Wonderful Wizard of Oz", Book by William F. Brown, Music and Lyrics by Charlie Smalls, Music Arrangement by Nao'ymt, Music Direction by Tosh Masuda, Choreography by Rino Nakasone, Art Direction by Sebastian Masuda, Costume Design by Toshikazu Iwaya, Visual Design by Daito Manabe, Produced by PARCO Starring: Ayaka Umeda (AKB48), Yūka Tano (AKB48) and others
“The Two Gentlemen of Verona” 2015.1.23-25 Umeda Arts Theater, Osaka 2015.1.17-18 AICHI ARTS CENTER, Nagoya 2015.1.10-12 Canalcity THEATER, Fukuoka 2014.12.7-28 NISSAY THEATRE, Tokyo	Directed and Choreographed by Amon Miyamoto, Adapted by John Guare & Mel Shapiro, Lyrics by John Guare, Music by Galt MacDermot, Based on the play by William Shakespeare, Presented on Broadway by the New York Shakespeare Festival, Produced by Joseph Papp, Original Broadway Production directed by Mel Shapiro, Orchestrations by Galt MacDermot and Harold Wheeler
“Let's Sing a Song of LOVE” 2014.1.25-2.2 ORIX THEATER, Osaka 2014.1.10-21 TOKYU THEATRE Orb, Tokyo	Directed by Amon Miyamoto
“MERRILY WE ROLL ALONG” 2013.12.6-7 Umeda Arts Theater, Osaka 2013.11.1-17 THE GALAXY THEATRE, Tokyo	Directed and Choreographed by Amon Miyamoto, Book by George Furth, Lyrics and music by Stephen Sondheim
“Pinocchio” 2013.8 KAAT<Kanagawa Arts Theatre>, Kanagawa	Directed by Amon Miyamoto, Original Work by Carlo Collodi
“THE WIZ -The Wonderful Wizard of Oz-” 2012.9.28-30 KAAT<Kanagawa Arts Theatre>, Kanagawa 2012.10.6-7 Umeda Arts Theater, Osaka 2012.10.18-28 Tokyo International Forum Hall C, Tokyo 2012.11.3-5 Chunichi Theatre, Nagoya	Directed by Amon Miyamoto, Original Work by Lyman Frank Baum "The Wonderful Wizard of Oz", Book by William F. Brown, Music and Lyrics by Charlie Smalls, Music Direction and Arrangement by Nao'ymt, Choreographed by Rino Nakasone, Art Direction by Sebastian Masuda, Costume Design by Toshikazu Iwaya, Visual Design by Daito Manabe, Lighting Design by Riki Kihara, Produced by PARCO Starring: Yuka Masuda (AKB48), JONTE' MOANING and others
“PACIFIC OVERTURES” 2011.6 KAAT<Kanagawa Arts Theatre>, Kanagawa 2002.10 New National Theatre, Tokyo 2002.7 Lincoln Center Festival, NY, US 2000.10 New National Theatre, Tokyo	Directed and Choreographed by Amon Miyamoto, Music and Lyrics by Stephen Sondheim, Book by John Weidman, Additional material by Hugh Wheeler, Set and Mask Design by Rumi Matsui, Costume Design by Emi Wada
“SWEENEY TODD” 2013.5 KAAT<Kanagawa Arts Theatre>, Kanagawa 2013.5 Aoyama Theatre, Tokyo 2013.5 Theater BRAVA!, Osaka 2013.6 The Aichi Arts Center, Nagoya 2011.5 Aoyama Theatre, Tokyo 2007.1 Nissey Theatre, Tokyo	Directed and Choreographed by Amon Miyamoto, Music and Lyrics by Stephen Sondheim, Book by Hugh Wheeler
“THE FANTASTICKS” 2010.6 The Duchess Theatre, London, UK	Directed and Choreographed by Amon Miyamoto, Music by Tom Jones, Book and Lyrics by Harvey Schmidt, Set Design by Rumi Matsui, Lighting Design by Rick Fisher, Costume Design by Nicky Shaw, Orchestrations / Musical Supervision: Jason Carr, musical director: Tom Deering, Sound Design by Mike Walker, Casting by Irene Cotton, General Management : Cole Kitchenn Ltd Starring: Hadley Fraser, Clive Rowe, Edward Petherbridge, Lorna Want, David Burt, Luke Brady, Paul Hunter, Carl Au
“GREY GARDENS” 2009.11 Theatre Creation, Tokyo	Directed by Amon Miyamoto, Book by Doug Wright, Music by Scott Frankel, Lyrics by Michael Korie, Scenic Design by Tsuyoshi Kata, Costume Design by Ayako Maeda
“SUNDAY IN THE PARK WITH GEORGE” 2009.7 PARCO Theatre, Tokyo	Directed by Amon Miyamoto, Music and Lyrics by Stephen Sondheim, Book by James Lapine, Scenic Design by Shusaku Futamura, Costume Design by Hanako Kurosu
“THE THREEPENNY OPERA” 2009.4 Bunkamura Theatre Cocoon, Tokyo	Directed by Amon Miyamoto, Book by Bertolt Brecht, Music by Kurt Weill, Costume design by Toshikazu Iwaya (Dress33), Scenic Design by Rumi Matsui, music director by Kazuhisa Uchihashi
“THE DROWSY CHAPERONE” 2009.1 Nissey Theatre, Tokyo	Directed, Choreographed and Translated by Amon Miyamoto, Book by Bob Martin and Don McKellar, Music and Lyrics by Lisa Lambert and Greg Morrison
“TURANDOT” 2008.3 Akasaka ACT Theater, Tokyo	Directed and Choreographed by Amon Miyamoto, Based on Puccini’s ”Turandot”, Music by Joe Hisaishi, Lyric by Yukinojo Mori, Costume Design by Wada Emi, Scenic Design by Rumi Matsui
“UP IN THE AIR” 2008.2 The Kennedy Center, Washington D.C., US	Conceived and Directed by Amon Miyamoto, Book and Lyrics by Bill Russell, Music by Henry Krieger, Scenic Design by Neil Patel, Costume Design by Angela Wendt, Lighting Design by Donald Holder Starring: Jill Abramovitz, Stanley Bahorek, Donna Lynne Champlin, David McDonald, Jonathan Hammond, Deborah Lew, Lillias White, and Michael Leon Wooley
“TAKE FLIGHT” 2007.11 Tokyo International Forum Hall C, Tokyo	Directed, Choreographed and Translated by Amon Miyamoto, Book by John Weidman, Music by David Shire, Lyrics by Richard Maltby Jr., musical director and Conductor: David Charles Abell, Set Design by Neil Patel, Costume Design Paul Tazewell
“THE FANTASTICKS” 2005.2-4 Setagaya Public Theater, Tokyo 2003.1-2 Setagaya Public Theater, Tokyo	Directed and Choreographed by Amon Miyamoto, Book and Lyrics by Tom Jones, Music by Harvey Schmidt
“PACIFIC OVERTURES” 2004.12- 5.1 Studio54 NY, US In 2005, the production was nominated for Tony Awards under 4 categories.	Directed by Amon Miyamoto, Music and Lyrics by Stephen Sondheim, Book by John Weidman, Additional material by Hugh Wheeler, Orchestrations by Jonathan Tunick, Music Direction by Paul Gemignani, Directed and Choreographed by Amon Miyamoto, Set and Mask Design by Rumi Matsui, Costume Design by Junko Koshino, Lighting Design by Brian Mac Devitt, Sound Design by Dan Moses Schreier, Produced by Roundaount Theatre Company in association with Gorgeous Entertainment Starring: B.D.Wong, Michel K. Lee, Paolo Montalban and others
“INTO THE WOODS” 2006.5-6 New National Theatre, Tokyo 2004.6 New National Theatre, Tokyo	Directed and Choreographed by Amon Miyamoto, Book and Lyrics by Stephen Sondheim, Book by James Lapine,
“CANDIDE” 2004.4-5 Tokyo International Forum Hall C, Tokyo	Directed by Amon Miyamoto, Original Work by Voltaire, Music by Leonard Bernstein, Book by Hugh Wheeler, Lyrics by Richard Wilbur and Stephen Sondheim, musical director and Conductor: David Charles Abell, Set Design by Neil Patel
“CANDIDE” 2001.6 Tokyo International Forum Hall C, Tokyo	Directed by Amon Miyamoto, Original Work by Voltaire, Music by Leonard Bernstein, Book by Hugh Wheeler, Lyrics by Richard Wilbur and Stephen Sondheim, musical director and Conductor by Yutaka Sado, Set Design by Neil Patel
“URINE TOWN” 2004.2 Nissey Theatre, Tokyo	Directed and Choreographed by Amon Miyamoto, Music and Lyrics by Mark Hollmann, Book and Lyrics by Greg Kotis
“THE NUTCRACKER, The Musical” 2001, 12- 02.1 Akasaka ACT Theatre, Tokyo	Directed by Amon Miyamoto, Book by Shintaro Tsuji, Music and Lyrics by Michael John LaChiusa
“BOYS TIME” 2001, 00, 99 PARCO Theatre, Tokyo	Directed by Amon Miyamoto
“GIRLS TIME” 2001, 00, 96, 95 PARCO Theatre, Tokyo	Directed and Choreographed by Amon Miyamoto
“TANUKI GOTEN” 1996 Shinbashi Embujo, Tokyo	Directed by Amon Miyamoto Starring: Susan Osborn
“MAUI” 1995 Art Sphere Theatre, Tokyo	Conceived, Directed and Set Design by Amon Miyamoto
“GESSHOKU” 1994 Art Sphere Theatre, Tokyo	Conceived and Directed by Amon Miyamoto, Book by Osamu Hashimoto, Set Design by Tadanori Yokoo, Music by Hoppy Kamiyama
“HONGKONG RHAPSODY” 1993 Art Sphere Theatre, Tokyo	Conceived, Choreographed and Directed by Amon Miyamoto, Music by Dick Lee
“THE SOUND OF MUSIC” 1995 Imperial Theatre, Tokyo 1992 Aoyama Theatre, Tokyo	Directed by Amon Miyamoto, Music by Richard Rodgers, Lyrics by Oscar Hammerstein II
“ON THE 20TH CENTURY” 1990 Aoyama Theatre, Tokyo	Directed and Choreographed by Amon Miyamoto, Book and Lyrics by Betty Comden and Adolph Green, Music by CY Coleman
“ANYTHING GOES” 1991 Nissey Theatre, Tokyo 1990 Kintetsu Theatre, Osaka 1989 Nissey Theatre, Tokyo	Directed and Choreographed by Amon Miyamoto, Music and Lyrics by Cole Porter, Book by Timony Crouse and John Weidman
“ANNIE GET YOUR GUN” 1989.88 Shinjuku KOMA, Tokyo	Directed and Choreographed by Amon Miyamoto, Lyrics and Music by Irving Berlin, Book by Herbert Fields and Dorothy Fields

=== Kabuki ===
TITLE	STAFF/ CAST
“Nihon Mukashibanashi” 2018.1 Shimbashi Embujo, Tokyo	Directed by Amon Miyamoto Starring: Ebizo Ichikawa, Shido Nakamura and others
“Ryugu Monogatari” “Momotaro Onigashima Gaiden” 2015.6 Bunkamura Theatre Cocoon, Tokyo	Directed by Amon Miyamoto Starring: Ebizo Ichikawa and others
“Hanasaka Jiisan” 2013.8 Bunkamura Theatre Cocoon, Tokyo	Directed by Amon Miyamoto Starring: Ebizo Ichikawa, Kataoka Ainosuke VI, and others

=== Noh ===
TITLE	STAFF/ CAST
“YUGEN” 2018.9 Royal Opera of Versailles, France	Directed by Amon Miyamoto
“YUGEN: The Hidden Beauty of Japan” 2016.10 Asian Civilisations Museum, Singapore	Directed by Amon Miyamoto

=== Non Verbal Performance ===
TITLE	STAFF/ CAST
“SUPERLOSERZ SAVE THE EARTH“ 2015.12.5-15 New National Theatre, Tokyo, 2016.1.7-11 Theater BRAVA!, Osaka	Directed by Amon Miyamoto
DRUM TAO “DRUM HEART” (Hyakkaryoran Nippon Drum Emaki) 2015.7.16-26 The Galaxy Theater, Tokyo, 2015.5.5-2016.1.17 National Tour (Japan), 2016.2.11-14 Skirball Center for the Performing Arts, NY, USA	Directed by Amon Miyamoto, Costume Design by Junko Koshino, Set Design by Rumi Matsui
“TEE! TEE! TEE!” 2014.7.6-9.1 Okinawa	Directed by Amon Miyamoto, Choreographed by Rino Nakasone

=== Special Event ===
TITLE	STAFF/ CAST
Hibiya Festival Opening Show 2018.4 Tokyo Midtown Hibiya	Directed by Amon Miyamoto
World Forum on Sport and Culture - Cultural Program “The Land of the Rising Sun” 2016.10 Grand Hyatt Hotel Tokyo	Directed by Amon Miyamoto, Starring Ichikawa Ebizō XI, Ryohei Suzuki, Maki Mori, Blue Tokyo, Wrecking Crew Orchestra/EL Squad and others
Commemorative Ceremony of the 150th Anniversary of the Opening of the Port of Yokohama “VISION ! YOKOHAMA” 2009 National Convention Hall, Pacifico Yokohama	Book and Directed by Amon Miyamoto

=== Reading ===
TITLE	STAFF/ CAST
“Fanatic Artist Hokusai (Gakyojin Hokusai)” 2017.1 The Sumida Hokusai Museum, Tokyo 2017.7 The British Museum, London 2017.9 Hikifune Culture Center, Tokyo	Directed by Amon Miyamoto
“Hoichi the Earless” 2012.4 KAAT<Kanagawa Arts Theatre>, Kanagawa	Directed by Amon Miyamoto, Book by Yakumo Koizumi
“ISAMU NOGUCHI” 2011.11 KAAT<Kanagawa Arts Theatre>, Kanagawa	Directed by Amon Miyamoto

=== Revue ===
TITLE	STAFF/ CAST
“HELLO KITTY DREAM REVUE [ONE]” 2000 Sunrio Puro Land, Tokyo	Script, Lyrics, Translation, Music Arrangement, Set Design, and Direction by Amon Miyamoto

=== Dance ===
TITLE	STAFF/ CAST
“THE 7 DEADLY SINS e.t.c” 1998 Art Sphere, Tokyo	Directed by Amon Miyamoto, Book by Bertolt Bercht, Music by Kurt Weill

=== Film ===
TITLE	STAFF/ CAST
“BEAT” 1998 officially invited to The 55th International Venice Film Festival for International Critics' Week	Written and Directed by Amon Miyamoto

=== Drama ===
- Boogie Woogie (2023), Kaoru Hujimura

=== Straight Play (as a performer) ===
TITLE	STAFF/ CAST
“METAMORPHOSIS” 1992 Art Sphere, Tokyo	Book by Kafka, Directed by Steven Berkoff, Performed by Amon Miyamoto and others
