= Poet Li Bai =

Chinese-language chamber opera by Guo Wenjing

Poet Li Bai (Chinese: 《诗人李白》) is a Chinese-language chamber opera by Guo Wenjing to a libretto by Diana Liao (廖端丽) and Xu Ying (徐瑛) on the subject of the poet Li Bai. It was premiered, with subtitles, 7 July 2007 at the Central City Opera House, Central City, Colorado, directed by Lin Zhaohua, conducted by Ed Spanjaard, and produced by Martha Liao. Subsequently, the opera was performed in Beijing and Hong Kong
