= Susan Botti =

American composer (born 1962)

- Born: April 13, 1962 (age 64); Wichita Falls, Texas, U.S.
- Education: Cleveland Institute of Music; Wellesley College; Berklee College of Music; Manhattan School of Music
- Occupation: Composer
- Employer: University of Michigan; Manhattan School of Music
- Awards: Guggenheim Fellowship (2006)
- Musical career
- Genres: Classical music; opera

Susan Teresa Botti (born April 13, 1962) is an American composer of contemporary classical music, librettist, and soprano opera singer. Originally working in theater, she studied classical music at the Berklee College of Music and Manhattan School of Music, and she began a career in opera, with her work including Wonderglass (1993) and Telaio: Desdemona (1995). She has also performed as an opera singer for composer Tan Dun.

== Biography ==
Susan Teresa Botti was born on April 13, 1962, in Wichita Falls, Texas. Her father, Robert E. Botti, was head of cardiology at University Hospitals Cleveland Medical Center. She attended St. Ann School and Beaumont School in Cleveland Heights, Ohio; the Cleveland Institute of Music, where she studied classical piano and voice; and the Cleveland Play House, where she studied theater.

After graduating from Wellesley College, she moved to Manhattan, where she lived in "a cheap sublet in the East Village". During her time in New York City, she participated in experimental theater and studied vocal jazz with Dee Kohanna, during which she was inspired to Berklee College of Music. While in Boston, she studied jazz piano, percussion, and voice at Berklee, obtained her BM there in 1986, and was part of the Greek chorus in the American Repertory Theater production of Alcestis, directed by Robert Wilson. In 1990, she obtained her Master of Music degree from the Manhattan School of Music (MSM), where she recalled her teacher Ludmila Ulehla as "the one who first threw [Botti] on stage with [her] own work".

After doing a piece inspired by the Lewis Carroll poem "Jabberwocky", she wrote and composed Wonderglass, an opera inspired by Alice in Wonderland; it premiered in 1993 at the Cranbrook American Artist Series, as did another opera from Botti, Telaio: Desdemona, in 1995. According to Mark Stryker of the Detroit Free Press, Botti's music composition "draws on several idioms – classical, theatrical, world music – without resorting to pastiche or cliches and without mortgaging a razor-sharp wit", and while "her vocal writing is unpredictable, [...] the gestures, particularly when voiced by her own silvery soprano, have a striking lyric thrust".

Botti has also collaborated with composer Tan Dun, particularly as a soprano performer. The Huddersfield Daily Examiner said that her soprano performance at the 1996 BBC Radio 3 performance of Red Forecast (Orchestral Theatre III) in Huddersfield Town Hall was "equally impressive" compared to the BBC Scottish Symphony Orchestra. In a review of the 1997 New York City Opera performance of the Tan Dun opera Marco Polo, Justin Davidson of Newsday said that she "sang the role of Water with a voice that ran clear and sweet".

In 2001, she performed her own composition EchoTempo at Avery Fisher Hall; this was the first time a composition at a regular New York Philharmonic subscription concert featured its own composer as a vocalist. She was the 2003–2005 Daniel R. Lewis Young Composer Fellow at the Cleveland Orchestra. In 2005, she was awarded a Frederic A. Juilliard/Walter Damrosch Rome Prize in music composition. In 2006, she was awarded a Guggenheim Fellowship in music composition. She was one of nine composers profiled in the 2011 book Women of Influence in Contemporary Music.

In 2000, she joined the University of Michigan as Assistant Professor of Music Composition. She left UMich in 2006 and moved to the composition faculty at MSM. By 2021, her work at MSM was part-time. She also works at Vassar College as an adjunct associate professor.

She has also been involved in commercial work, particularly Kodak's 1988 "True Colors" Olympic jingle, which she took in order to pay for her graduate studies; the soundtrack for the 2000 science fiction film Mission to Mars; and a minor acting role in the crime drama Spenser For Hire.

On August 20, 1988, she married Roland Vazquez, a fellow MSM alumnus and later a Latin jazz musician whom she is also a collaborator, at Amasa Stone Chapel in Cleveland, Ohio; they have two children. They lived in Italy after she became a Rome Fellow, before moving to Red Hook, New York in the 2010s.

== Operas ==
- Jabberwocky (1989; as composer)
- Wonderglass (1993; as composer and librettist)
- Telaio: Desdemona (1995; as composer)
