= Rumi Matsui =

Japanese set designer and scenographer

- Born: Osaka, Japan
- Citizenship: Japan
- Education: Tama Art University, Central School of Art and Design
- Occupations: Set designer, Scenographer
- Years active: 1989 -
- Website: http://centreline.org/rumimatsui/

Rumi Matsui (松井るみ, born in Osaka, Japan) is a Japanese set designer and scenographer based in Tokyo. She is the president of Centreline Associates.

== Biography ==
In 1985 Rumi Matsui completed her BA in graphic design at Tama Art University and joined Shiki Theatre Company. This led her into further education in theatre design at Central School of Art and Design in London. After her return to Japan in 1990, Matsui began her career as a set designer and scenographer establishing Centreline Associates Inc. in 1991. She has designed over four hundred theatrical productions and won numerous awards including Yomiuri Drama Grand Prix for the best set designer and the Kinokuniya Drama Award. In 2004, her Broadway debut Pacific Overtures at Studio 54 was nominated for the Tony Award's Best Scenic Design of a Musical. The Fantasticks was taken to London's West End in 2010. She has also designed a number of opera sets such as Junior Butterfly for the 52nd Puccini Festival at Torre del Lago Puccini in Italy and Tea: A Mirror of Soul at Santa Fe Opera in New Mexico. In recent years, she has been expanding her practice to concert set design, notably including Japanese pop group AKB48 at the National Athletic Stadium in 2014. Matsui also contributed the scenic design to Korin; a play inspired by ancient mythology about the origin of Japan, which was given as an offering to and performed at Kyoto's oldest Shinto shrine Kamigamo Jinja. Matsui was a member of the jurors for Prague Quadrennial '07 and she was listed as one of the Honorable Scenographers by OISTAT (International Organization of Scenographers, Theatre Architects and Technicians) in 2007. Matsui is currently a guest instructor of set design at Tokyo University of the Arts, and remains the president of Centreline Associates Inc., one of the major theatre set design companies in Japan.

== Selected works ==
=== Musical ===
- Rainbow Prelude (2014), directed by Yukio Ueshima
- The Addams Family (2014), directed by Akira Shirai
- Anything Goes (2013), directed by Kazuya Yamada
- Mozart, l'opéra rock (2013), directed by Philip McKinley
- Hamlet (2012), directed by Tamiya Kuriyama
- Gold –Camille and Rodin (2011), directed by Akira Shirai
- Piaf (2011, 2013), directed by Akira Shirai
- Dracula (2011), directed by Toru Kikkawa
- Gone With the Wind (2011), directed by Kazuya Yamada
- Only Yesterday (2011), directed by Tamiya Kuriyama
- The Fantasticks (2010), directed by Amon Miyamoto
- Jane Eyre (2009, 2012), directed by John Caird
- Blood Brothers (2009, 2010), directed by Glen Walford
- Rudolf –the last kiss (2008), directed by Amon Miyamoto
- Sweeney Todd (2007, 2011, 2013), directed by Amon Miyamoto
- Here's Love (2004, 2005), directed by Toru Kikkawa
- Urinetown (2004), directed by Amon Miyamoto
- The Witches of Eastwick (2003, 2005, 2008), directed by Kazuya Yamada
- The Little Prince (2003, 2005), directed by Akira Shirai
- Pacific Overtures (2000, 2002, 2004), directed by Amon Miyamoto

=== Play ===
- Mercury Fur (2015), directed by Akira Shirai
- Sanada Ten Braves (2014), directed by Yukihiko Tsutsumi
- Pygmalion (2013), directed by Keiko Miyata
- Lost in Yonkers (2013), directed by Kōki Mitani
- True West (2013), directed by Scott Elliott
- Bun to Fun (2013), directed by Tamiya Kuriyama
- Headache, Stiff Neck, Ichiyo Higuchi (2013), directed byTamiya Kuriyama
- The Dresser (2013), directed by Kōki Mitani
- Soldiers in the Tree (2013), directed by Tamiya Kuriyama
- Sonan, (2012), directed by Yukiko Motoya
- The King's Speech (2012), directed by Yumi Suzuki
- Yabuhara, the Blind Master Minstrel (2012), directed by Tamiya Kuriyama
- The Cherry Orchard (2012), directed by Kōki Mitani
- The Sister (2011), directed by Masahiko Kawahara
- Crazy Honey (2011), directed by Yukiko Motoya
- Rain (2011), directed by Tamiya Kuriyama
- Top Girls (2011), directed by Yumi Suzuki
- Jeanne d'Ark (2010), directed by Akira Shirai
- Harper Regan (2010), directed by Keishi Nagatsuka
- Macbeth (2010, 2013), directed by Mansai Nomura
- The Seafarer (2009), directed by Tamiya Kuriyama
- Sakurahime (2009), Kazuyoshi Kushida
- Henry IV (2009), directed by Akira Shirai
- Shun-kin (2008, 2009, 2010, 2013), directed by Simon McBurney
- Kuni Nusubito (2007, 2009), directed by Mansai Nomura
- Hysteria (2007), directed by Akira Shirai
- The Fastest Clock in the Universe (2003), directed by Akira Shirai
- Pitchfork Disney (2002), directed by Akira Shirai
- The Elephant Man (2002), directed by Keiko Miyata

=== Opera ===
- Die tote Stadt (2014), directed by Tamiya Kuriyama
- Lear (2013), directed by Tamiya Kuriyama
- Die Fledermaus (2013), directed by Akira Shirai
- La Damnation de Faust (2010), directed by Sakiko Oshima
- Otello (2010), directed by Akira Shirai
- La Traviata (2009), directed by Amon Miyamoto
- Turandot (2008), directed by Amon Miyamoto
- Tea: A Mirror of Soul (2007, 2010, 2013), directed byAmon Miyamoto
- Daphne (2007), directed by Sakiko Oshima
- White Nights (2006, 2009), directed by Akira Shirai
- Junior Butterfly (2006, 2014), directed by Masahiko Shimada

=== Takarazuka Revue ===
- Star Troupe: South Pacific (2013), directed by Ryo Harada
- Flower Troupe: Poetry of Love and Revolution - Andrea Chénier- (2013), directed by Keiko Ueda
- Snow Troupe: Spring Lightning (2013), directed by Ryo Harada

=== Concert ===
- AKB48: Spring Concerts (2014)
- AKB48: Summer Tour (2013)

== Awards ==
- 38th Kazuo Kikuta Drama Award (2013)
- 19th Yomiuri Grand Drama Award for Best Designer (2012)
- 15th Yomiuri Grand Drama Award for Best Designer (2008)
- 59th Tony Award Nominee for the Best Scenic Design of a Musical (2005)
- Yomiuri Grand Drama Award for the Grand Prix of Best Designer (2002)
- Kinokuniya Drama Award (2002)
- Novi Sad International Theatre Festival Special Jury's Award (2001)
- 8th Yomiuri Grand Drama Award for Best Designer (2000)
- Kisaku Ito Award for newcomers (1997)
