= Wolf Cub Village =

Wolf Cub Village (Chinese Diary of a Madman) is a 1994 Chinese-language chamber opera in four scenes by Guo Wenjing to a libretto by Zeng Li after Lu Xun's story "Diary of a Madman".
