= Paul Griffiths (writer) =

British music critic, novelist and librettist

Paul Anthony Griffiths OBE (born 1947) is a British music critic, novelist and librettist. He is particularly noted for his writings on modern classical music and for having written the libretti for two 20th-century operas, Tan Dun's Marco Polo and Elliott Carter's What Next?.

== Career ==
Paul Griffiths was born on 24 November 1947 in the Welsh town of Bridgend to Fred and Jeanne Griffiths. By 1952 the family were living in Birmingham, and he attended King Edward's School, Birmingham 1958-1965. He received his BA and MSc in biochemistry from University of Oxford, and from 1971 worked as a freelance music critic. He joined the editorial staff of The New Grove Dictionary of Music and Musicians in 1973 and in 1982 became the chief music critic for The Times, a post which he held for ten years. From 1992 to 1996, he was a music critic for The New Yorker, and from 1997 to 2005, for The New York Times. A collection of his musical criticism for these and other periodicals was published in 2005 as The Substance of Things Heard: Writings about Music (Eastman Studies in Music, 31).

In 1978, he also began writing reference books and monographs on classical music and composers starting with Modern Music: A Concise History from Debussy to Boulez and Boulez (Volume 16 of Oxford Studies of Composers). Although the majority of these publications have dealt with 20th-century composers and their music, he has also written more general works on classical music, including The String Quartet: A History (1985), The Penguin Companion to Classical Music (2005), and A Concise History of Western Music (2006). The last of these has been translated into seven languages.

Griffiths has been a guest lecturer at institutions including the University of Southern California, IRCAM, Oxford University, Harvard University, Cornell University (Messenger Lectures, 2008) and the City University of New York Graduate Center (Old Lecture, 2013), and has served on juries for international competitions, among them the Premio Paolo Borciani and the ARD Musikwettbewerb. He was named a Chevalier dans l'Ordre des Arts et des Lettres in 2002 and a Member of the American Academy of Arts and Sciences in 2011, when he also won a Deems Taylor Award for his notes for Miller Theatre.

In 1989, Griffiths published his first novel, Myself and Marco Polo: A Novel of Changes, which went on to win the 1990 Commonwealth Writers' Prize for the best first novel in the Europe and South Asia region. The novel is a fictional version of Marco Polo's memoirs which he dictated to Rustichello da Pisa, his fellow inmate in the Genoese prison where he had been incarcerated upon his return from China. (Rustichello is the "myself" of the title.) Two years later, he published his second novel, The Lay of Sir Tristram, a retelling of the Tristan and Iseult legend interjected with the narrator's own love story and his meditations on the legend's fluctuating influence and interpretation over time. Griffiths's third novel, let me tell you (2008), uses a constrained writing technique similar to those employed by the avant-garde Oulipo group. In let me tell you, Ophelia tells her story in a first-person narrative devised by Griffiths using only the 481-word vocabulary given to her in Shakespeare's Hamlet. Griffiths uses the same 481-word constraint in the 2023 sequel let me go on.

Griffiths's first excursion as an opera librettist was The Jewel Box which used music from Mozart's unfinished operas Lo sposo deluso and L'oca del Cairo as well as several arias and ensembles that he had written for insertion into operas by other composers. The storyline is an imagined reconstruction of a pantomime in which Mozart and Aloysia Weber are said to have taken part in 1783. The Jewel Box premiered in 1991 in Nottingham performed by Opera North and conducted by Elgar Howarth. It was subsequently performed in the United States by Skylight Opera Theatre (1993), Wolf Trap Opera (1994), Chicago Opera Theater (1996), and New Jersey State Opera (1996). It was revived by Bampton Classical Opera in 2006 for the 250th anniversary of Mozart's birth. His second work of this type, Aeneas in Hell, was set to songs and dance music from Purcell's theatre scores and was devised as a "prequel" to the composer's 1689 opera, Dido and Aeneas. It premiered in 1995 at the University of Maryland's Ulrich Recital Hall conducted by Kenneth Slowik.

Griffiths's libretto for Tan Dun's Marco Polo was his first for an opera by a living composer. In the late 1980s, Tan Dun was commissioned by the Edinburgh International Festival to compose an original opera. As he recounted in a 1997 interview:

I first tried to write the libretto myself, about something from myself, and wasn't getting anywhere. Then someone, in 1990, said why not read Paul Griffiths's novel Myself and Marco Polo? I read it and phoned him at his home near Oxford. And he agreed to write a libretto.

Marco Polo finally received its world premiere in 1996, not in Edinburgh as originally planned, but in Munich at the Munich Biennale. Although Griffiths's libretto was not directly related to or based on his novel, the first line of the opera, "I have not told one half of what I saw", was the novel's final statement.

Griffiths's next commission as a librettist was for Elliott Carter's only opera, What Next?. The work premiered in 1999 at Berlin's Staatsoper Unter den Linden, conducted by Daniel Barenboim who also conducted its US premiere in a concert performance by the Chicago Symphony Orchestra the following year.

In addition to his original libretti, Griffiths has produced modern English translations of those for Stravinsky's Histoire du soldat, Mozart's Die Zauberflöte, and Puccini's La bohème.

Griffiths has also written original texts for non-operatic settings, including The General, which premiered in Montreal on 16 January 2007, with Kent Nagano conducting the Montreal Symphony Orchestra. The General, a concert piece for symphony orchestra, narrator, soprano and chorus, had been commissioned by Nagano as a tribute to the Canadian General Roméo Dallaire. Griffiths's narrative texts, inspired by Dallaire's attempts to stop the Rwandan genocide, are interwoven with the music from Beethoven's complete Egmont score, other theatre music and Opferlied (Song of Sacrifice).

Other musical collaborations have come out of his novel let me tell you, including there is still time, subtitled "scenes for speaking voice and cello", with spoken narration accompanying music by the cellist-composer Frances-Marie Uitti. The work was recorded in 2003 by ECM Records with Griffiths himself as the narrator.

More directly connected to the novel is a concert work by Hans Abrahamsen, also titled let me tell you and composed for Barbara Hannigan with the Berlin Philharmonic Orchestra, who gave the first performance on 20 December 2013, Andris Nelsons conducting.

Griffiths was appointed Officer of the Order of the British Empire (OBE) in the 2014 New Year Honours for services to music, literature, and composition.

== Bibliography ==
Music history and criticism

- Modern Music: A Concise History from Debussy to Boulez, Thames and Hudson, 1978 ISBN 978-0-50-020164-0 (Revised&Subsequent version, 1994, ISBN 978-0-50-020278-4) (Japanese translation, 1984 ISBN 978-4276113510) Portuguese Brazilian translation, 1988 ISBN 978-8571100046) (Korean translation, 1994 ISBN 89-7300-033-0)
- Modern Music: The avant garde since 1945, Braziller, 1981 (revised and expanded as Modern Music and After: Directions since 1945, Oxford University Press, 1995 ISBN 0-19-816511-0; third edition, Oxford University Press, 2010 ISBN 978-0-19-974050-5) (Japanese translation, 1998 ISBN 978-4276113527)
- A Guide to Electronic Music, Thames and Hudson, 1981. ISBN 0-500-27203-4
- The String Quartet: A History, Thames and Hudson, 1985. ISBN 0-500-27383-9
- —— (1985). New Sounds, New Personalities: British Composers of the 1980s. London: Faber and Faber. ISBN 978-0-571-10061-3.
- The Penguin Companion to Classical Music, Penguin Group, 2005. ISBN 0-14-051559-3
- The Substance of Things Heard: writings about music, Volume 31 of Eastman Studies in Music, University of Rochester Press, 2005. ISBN 1-58046-206-5
- A Concise History of Western Music, Cambridge University Press, 2006. ISBN 0-521-84294-8
- La musica del novecento, Einaudi, 2014. ISBN 978-8-806-21330-5

Monographs on 20th-century composers

- Boulez (Volume 16 of Oxford Studies of Composers), Oxford University Press, 1978
- Cage (Volume 18 of Oxford Studies of Composers), Oxford University Press, 1981 (Japanese translation, 2003 ISBN 978-4791760503)
- Peter Maxwell Davies (Contemporary Composers series), Robson Books, 1982. ISBN 0-86051-138-3
- Second Viennese School: Schoenberg, Webern, Berg (with Oliver Neighbour and George Perle for the New Grove Composer Biographies series) Norton, 1983. ISBN 0-393-31587-8
- György Ligeti (Contemporary Composers series), Robson Books, 1983. ISBN 0-87663-442-0
- Bartók (Master Musicians series), J.M. Dent & Sons, 1988
- Olivier Messiaen and the Music of Time, Faber & Faber, 2008. ISBN 0-571-24732-6
- Stravinsky (Master Musicians series), J.M. Dent & Sons, 1992. ISBN 0-460-04614-4
- The Sea on Fire: Jean Barraqué (Volume 25 of Eastman Studies in Music), University of Rochester Press, 2003. ISBN 1-58046-141-7,

Librettos

- The Jewel Box, or, A Mirror Remade – premiered 1991 (published by Chatto & Windus, ISBN 0-7011-3853-X)
- Aeneas in Hell – premiered 1994 (unpublished)
- Marco Polo – premiered 1996 (published by G. Schirmer, ISBN 0-634-00238-4)
- What Next? – premiered 1999 (published by Boosey & Hawkes)
- Gulliver (unpublished)

Novels and short stories

- Myself and Marco Polo: A Novel of Changes, Chatto & Windus, 1989. ISBN 0-7011-3571-9
- The Lay of Sir Tristram, Chatto & Windus, 1991. ISBN 0-7011-3570-0
- "Leda" in Ovid Metamorphosed (Philip Terry ed.), Chatto & Windus, 2000. ISBN 0-09-928177-5
- let me tell you, Reality Street Editions, 2008. ISBN 1-874400-43-1
- The Tilted Cup: Noh Stories, Sylph Editions, 2013. ISBN 978-1-909631-02-1
  - Translated into French by Emilie Syssau: Pavillon lunaire: contes nô, Éditions de la Différence, 2014. ISBN 978-2-7291-2132-7
- Mr. Beethoven, Henningham Family Press, 2020. ISBN 978-1-999797-49-2. New York Review Books, 2021. ISBN 978-1-681375-80-9
- The Tomb Guardians, Henningham Family Press, 2021. ISBN 978-1-916218-61-1
- let me go on, Henningham Family Press, 2023 ISBN 978-1916218673
- let me tell you/let me go on, New York Review Books, 2025. ISBN 978-1681379258

== Sources ==
- CBC News, "Montreal Symphony premieres Dallaire tribute", 18 January 2007. Retrieved 30 August 2009.
- Cummings, Paul (ed.), "Griffths, Paul", International Who's Who in Classical Music, Europa Publications, 2003, p. 299. ISBN 978-1-85743-174-2.
- Grimbert, Joan T., Tristan and Isolde: A casebook, Routledge, 2002. ISBN 0-415-93910-0
- Kennedy, Michael and Bourne, Joyce (eds), "Griffths, Paul", The Concise Oxford Dictionary of Music, 5th edition, Oxford University Press, 2007. ISBN 978-0-19-920383-3. Retrieved 30 August 2009.
- Kerner, Leighton (11 November 1997). "Mind voyager". The Village Voice.
- Kimberley, Nick, "North by East-West", The Independent, 15 November 1998. Retrieved 30 August 2009.
- McLellan, Joseph (20 November 1995). "Aeneas in Hell: The Sequel". The Washington Post. Archived from the original on 26 October 2012 – via HighBeam Research.
- Rich, Alan, "Dark Elegies", LA Weekly, 30 June 2005. Retrieved 30 August 2009.
- Tommasini, Anthony, "6 Characters in Search of a Dimension, in Different Operatic Tempos", The New York Times, 10 December 2007. Retrieved 30 August 2009.
- Tonkin, Boyd, "Singing in the chains: a tongue-tied heroine", The Independent, 16 January 2009. Retrieved 30 August 2009.

| Preceded by Andrew Porter | Music Critic of The New Yorker; 1992–1996 | Succeeded by Alex Ross |
