= Nieuw Ensemble =

- Years active: 1980-2019
- Website: www.nieuw-ensemble.nl

The Nieuw Ensemble (Dutch pronunciation: [ˌniu ɑ̃ːˈsɑ̃ːblə]; English: New Ensemble) was a Dutch musical ensemble. Having worked in the field of new music for almost four decades, it eventually came to a halt at the end of 2019.

The ensemble was founded in 1980 in Amsterdam and it had a unique instrumental structure, using plucked instruments such as mandolin, guitar and harp in combination with wind, string and percussion. Ed Spanjaard has been the principal conductor since 1982.

Almost 1000 pieces have been written for the ensemble.

The Nieuw Ensemble had dedicated programmes to the works of a single composer, such as Luciano Berio, Pierre Boulez, Elliott Carter, Franco Donatoni, Brian Ferneyhough, Mauricio Kagel, Ton de Leeuw, György Kurtág, Theo Loevendie and Luigi Nono.

Since 1991, programmes featuring new works written especially for the ensemble by Chinese composers such as Tan Dun, Qu Xiao-Song, Xu Shuya, Chen Qigang and Guo Wenjing had appeared. In 1997, the group toured China with concerts in Shanghai and Beijing.

In 1998 the Nieuw Ensemble and Joël Bons were awarded the prestigious Prince Bernhard Fund Music Prize for the ‘markedly lively and adventurous programming that could be described as crossing borders, both in the literal and figurative sense'.

The Nieuw Ensemble has performed at the Venice Biennale.

The Nieuw Ensemble also participated in the Atlas Ensemble, a chamber orchestra with musicians from a number of different countries.
