= Netherlands Symphony Orchestra =

Dutch symphony orchestra

The Netherlands Symphony Orchestra (Dutch: Nederlands Symfonieorkest) is a Dutch symphony orchestra. The home of the orchestra is the Muziekcentrum in Enschede. The orchestra was previously known in Dutch as Orkest van het Oosten (literal translation "Orchestra of the East"), but in October 2011 changed its Dutch name to align with its English name, at which time the Dutch abbreviation "OvhO" was replaced with "NedSym." Due to objections from the Amsterdam-based Netherlands Philharmonic Orchestra, the Enschede orchestra had to change its name again, and from 2014 to 2019 was known as HET Symfonieorkest ("THE Symphony Orchestra"). Internationally, it continues to employ the name "Netherlands Symphony Orchestra".

As of September 2019, after fusion with the orchestra of Gelderland, the name of the orchestra is "Phion, Orkest van Gelderland & Overijssel" (Phion, Orchestra of Gelderland & Overijssel).

The orchestra performs about 75 concerts a year in Enschede, Hengelo, Zwolle and Deventer, as well as throughout the province of Overijssel and the Randstad. NedSym serves as orchestra for various provincial choirs and for the Dutch Touring Opera (Nederlandse Reisopera) for two productions a year.

== History ==
The precursor ensemble to the Orkest van het Oosten was the Twents Kamerorkest (Twents Chamber Orchestra), an amateur ensemble which began performing in the 1930s under the direction of Klaas de Rook. In 1947, this orchestra changed its name to the Twents Philharmonisch Orkest (Twents Philharmonic Orchestra). In 1954, the orchestra became fully professional under the name of the Overijssels Philharmonisch Orkest (Overijssels Philharmonic Orchestra), incorporating musicians from the Twents Harpsichord Ensemble and the Twents Chamber Orchestra.

In 1983, the Overijssels Philharmonic Orchestra was merged with Opera Forum. The two orchestras were joined as the Forum Philharmonic operating in two formations: one for accompanying the opera and the other for symphonic concerts; a few times a year, both performed together for large scale productions. In 1994, the orchestra was reduced and formed an independent ensemble under the name Orkest van het Oosten. Simultaneously in 1994, the Nationale Reisopera (which in 2014 changed its name to Nederlandse Reisopera) was organised from Opera Forum, without an orchestra. The Orkest van het Oosten was contracted to accompany two Reisopera productions a year.

== Conductors ==
Jaap van Zweden was chief conductor of the OvhO from 1996 to 2005. Since the 2006–2007 season, Jan Willem de Vriend has been chief conductor of the OvhO, with an initial contract of 3 years. Although there have been reports of controversy over his direction of the OvhO, his contract with the OvhO has been extended to 2012. In 2010, the "Orkest van het Oosten" was presented with an Edison Award. In January 2016, the orchestra announced that de Vriend would conclude his tenure as chief conductor at the end of the 2016–2017 season.

== Chief conductors ==
- Jaap van Zweden (1996–2005)
- Jan Willem de Vriend (2006–2017)
- Ed Spanjaard (2017–present)
