= Xu Ying (librettist) =

Chinese librettist

Xu Ying (徐瑛, born 1962) is a Chinese librettist.

His traditional Beijing opera librettos include Hunchback Prime Minister Liu (2002), Sun Wu the Strategist (2002), Cai Wenji (2003). He wrote the libretto for Bun Ching Lam's chamber opera Wenji (2001), co-wrote with composer Tan Dun the libretto of Tea (opera) (2002), and was co-librettist of the opera Poet Li Bai (2007) for composer Guo Wenjing.
