= Wenji: Eighteen Songs of a Nomad Flute =

2002 Chinese and English-language chamber opera

Wenji: Eighteen Songs of a Nomad Flute (Chinese 文姬 Wenji) is a 2002 Chinese and English-language chamber opera by Macao-born American composer Lam Bun-Ching to a libretto by Xu Ying. It based on the story of the girl Cai Wenji.
