= What Next? (opera) =

Opera by Elliott Carter

- Opera by Elliott Carter
- Librettist: Paul Griffiths
- Language: English
- Premiere: 16 September 1999; Staatsoper Unter den Linden, Berlin

What Next? is the only opera by Elliott Carter. Paul Griffiths wrote the libretto to the one-act work in 1997/98 on a commission from Staatsoper Unter den Linden in Berlin. The opera premiered there on 16 September 1999 in a fully staged production conducted by Daniel Barenboim.

== Performance history ==
- US premiere 24 February 2000, Orchestra Hall, Chicago, Chicago Symphony Orchestra, under Daniel Barenboim
- Netherlands premiere on 9 September 2000 at Amsterdam Concertgebouw under Péter Eötvös
- French premiere on 7 November 2000 at Cité de la Musique, Paris, under Kent Nagano
- British premiere on 5 January 2001 at Queen Elizabeth Hall, London, under Oliver Knussen
- Belgian premiere on 24 March 2002 at Concertgebouw, Bruges, under Péter Eötvös
- U.S. staged premiere on 27 July 2006 at the Tanglewood Music Festival under James Levine
- Munich staged premiere on 20 November 2007 at Prinzregententheater under Ulf Schirmer
- New York staged premiere on 7 December 2007 at Miller Theatre under Jeffrey Milarsky
- Italian premiere on 12 January 2008 in Turin under Peter Rundel
- Austrian staged premiere on 3 December 2008 in Vienna under Walter Kobéra
- Australian staged premiere on 15 August 2012 with Victorian Opera under Daniel Carter (performed as double bill with Manuel de Falla's Master Peter's Puppet Show)
- French staged premiere on 30 November 2012 at Opéra Berlioz Montpellier under Carl Christian Bettendorf

== Roles ==
Role	Voice type	Premiere cast, 16 September 1999 (Conductor: Daniel Barenboim)
Mama, a mother and much else	soprano	Lynne Dawson
Rose, a bride and a performer	soprano	Simone Nold
Stella, an astronomer	contralto	Hilary Summers
Kid, a boy	boy alto	Ian Antal
Zen, a supposed seer and not much else	tenor	William Joyner
Harry or Larry, a bridegroom and a clown	baritone	Hanno Müller-Brachmann

== Synopsis ==
As the percussionists replicate the sounds of a car crash the characters wake up and discover themselves lost. They are physically unhurt but have lost all memory of who they are and how they came to be together. Many theories arise from all the characters. Mama suggests that they were on their way to Rose and Harry or Larry's wedding, Stella is sure that she was driving to the astronomical institute with Kid, and Rose claims she was in a taxi on her way to her hotel after an extremely well received performance. Harry or Larry, Kid and Zen don't suggest any possible reasons how the situation came to be.

An argument arises about whose story is the right one. Zen is overwhelmed by the situation, and when he exits the stage in search of help, Mama accuses him of being a coward and goes to insult him. While Stella sings of the stars and space to Kid, she decides to follow the others. But, Kid is afraid of Mama and Zen so he decides not to follow Stella. When Rose realizes that everyone is gone, she asks Kid where they have all gone and Kid replies by pointing offstage.

After the adults are gone, Kid entertains himself. When the other characters return, they are completely disheveled and it is evident that their search for help has turned into another disaster. There are more arguments about a divorce between Mama and Zen that only Mama remembers. When four road workers arrive, they think they are saved but the road workers appear completely oblivious to the six victims. All hell breaks loose after the road workers leave. Mama discovers that Rose is pregnant, Harry or Larry is distressed to realize he can't remember if the baby is his, Stella and Mama both have nervous breakdowns, and only Kid remains sane. As Rose recalls the notes of a particularly horrible aria from her recent performance, Kid finally loses his temper. He shouts "What?" to the audience, Rose sings her highest possible note, and the lights go out.

== Recordings ==
There are four recordings (key: Conductor/Mama/Rose/Stella/Kid/Zen/Harry):

- Barenboim/Dawson/Nold/Summers/Antal/Joyner/Müller-Brachmann, 1999, live in Berlin (not commercially released)
- Eötvös/Sarah Leonard/Valdine Anderson/Summers/Emanuel Hoogeveen/Joyner/Dean Elzinga, 2000, live in Amsterdam, ECM New Series/Universal Classics 472 188 (CD)
- Levine/Jamie van Eyck/Kiera Duffy/Christin-Marie Hill/Rebecca Danning/Lawrence Jones/Chad Sloan, 2006, filmed at Lenox, BSO label (DVD)
- Schirmer/Vera Semieniuk/Anna Borchers/Sonja Leutwyler/Bastian Sistemich/Lucas Vanzelli/Andreas Burkhart, 2007, live in Munich (BR recording)
