= Limburgs Symfonie Orkest =

Dutch orchestra

- Orchestra
- Former name: Maastrichts Stedelijk Orkest
- Founded: 1883
- Disbanded: 2013
- Location: Maastricht, Netherlands
- Concert hall: Theater aan het Vrijthof
- Principal conductor: Ed Spanjaard

The Limburgs Symfonie Orkest (English: Limburg Symphony Orchestra) was a Dutch orchestra based in Maastricht, Netherlands. The orchestra was resident at the Theater aan het Vrijthof in Maastricht since 1992, and also performed in opera productions with Opera Zuid. The orchestra had received funding from the Dutch Ministry of Education, Culture and Science, the Province of Limburg and the Municipality of Maastricht.

The ensemble gave its first concert on 2 September 1883 as the Maastrichts Stedelijk Orkest ("Maastricht Municipal Orchestra"), with Otto Wolf as its first conductor. The orchestra also gave concerts in the North Brabant region. In 1955, the orchestra acquired the name of the Limburgs Symfonie Orkest. Ed Spanjaard served twice as chief conductor, first from 1982 to 1988, and later as the orchestra's final chief conductor, from 2001 to 2012.

Following elimination of government grants, the Limburgs Symfonie Orkest merged in April 2013 with Het Brabants Orkest to form the South Netherlands Philharmonic.

== Chief conductors ==
- Otto Wolf (1883–1915)
- Henri Hermans (1915–1947)
- Paul Hupperts (1947–1949)
- André Rieu sr. (1949–1980)
- Ed Spanjaard (1982–1988)
- Salvador Mas Conde (1988–1994)
- Shlomo Mintz (1995–1998)
- Junichi Hirokami (1998–2000)
- Ed Spanjaard (2001–2012)
