= Tan Dun =

Chinese-American composer and conductor (born 1957)

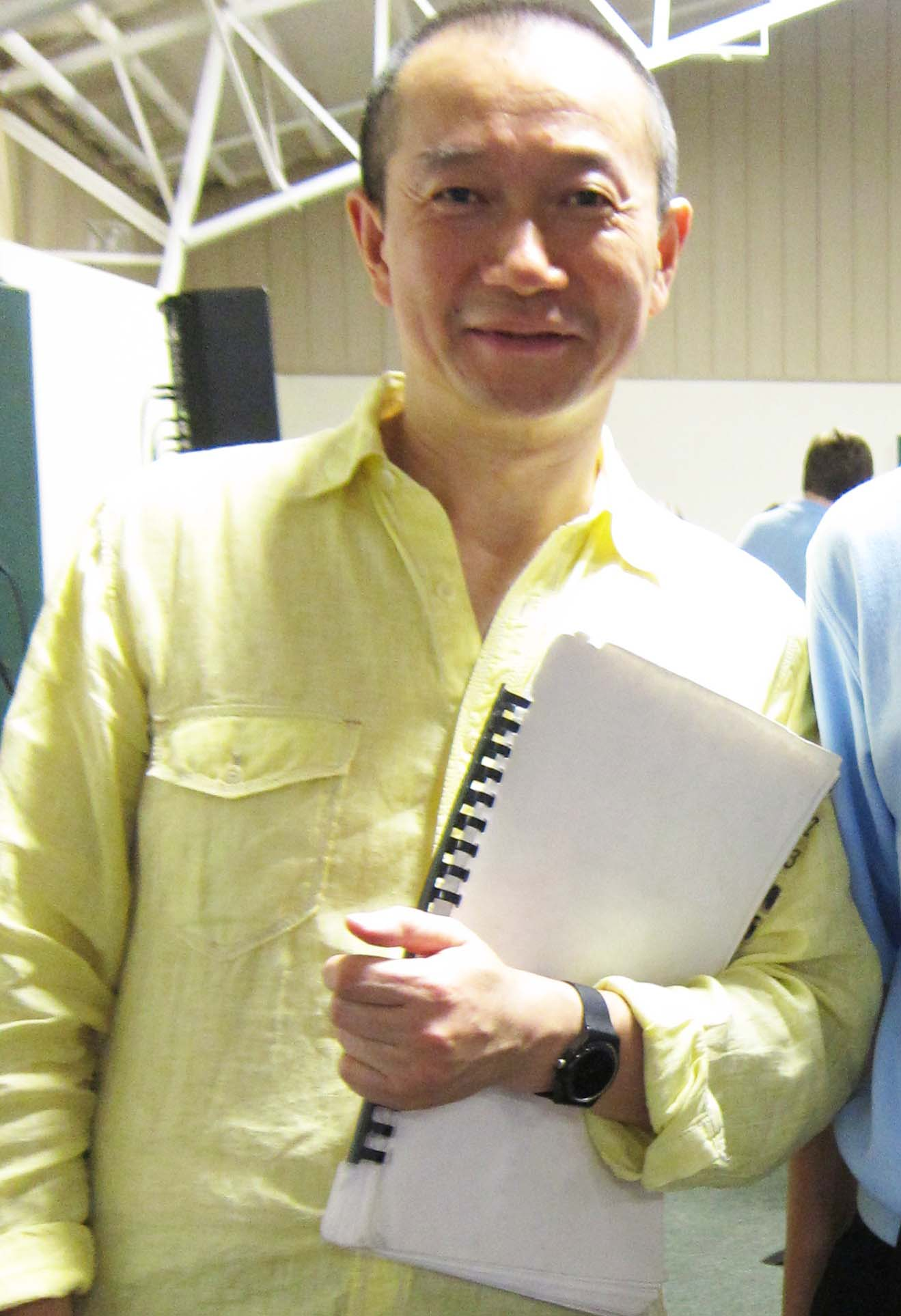
- Tan Dun in 2011
- Born: 18 August 1957 (age 69); Changsha, Hunan, China
- Education: Central Conservatory of Music; Columbia University
- Occupations: Composer; Conductor; Film scorer

Tan Dun (Chinese: 谭盾; pinyin: Tán Dùn, Mandarin pronunciation: [tʰǎn tu̯ə̂n]; born 18 August 1957) is a Chinese-born American composer and conductor. A leading figure of contemporary classical music, he draws from a variety of Western and Chinese influences, a pairing which has shaped much of his life and music. Having collaborated with leading orchestras around the world, Tan is the recipient of numerous awards, including a Grawemeyer Award for his opera Marco Polo (1996) and both an Academy Award and Grammy Award for his film score in Ang Lee's Crouching Tiger, Hidden Dragon (2000). His oeuvre as a whole includes operas, orchestral, vocal, chamber, solo and film scores, as well as genres that Tan terms "organic music" and "music ritual."

Born in Hunan, China, Tan grew up during the Cultural Revolution and received musical education from the Central Conservatory of Music. His early influences included both Chinese music and 20th-century classical music. Since receiving a DMA from Columbia University in 1993, Tan has been based in New York City. His compositions often incorporate audiovisual elements; use instruments constructed from organic materials, such as paper, water, and stone; and are often inspired by traditional Chinese theatrical and ritual performance. In 2013, he was named a UNESCO Goodwill Ambassador and on 1 July 2019 was named Dean of the Bard College Conservatory of Music.

== Biography ==
Tan Dun was born in 1957 in a village in Changsha in Hunan, China. As a child, he was fascinated by the rituals and ceremonies of the village shaman, which were typically set to music made with natural objects such as rocks and water. Due to the bans enacted during the Cultural Revolution, he was discouraged from pursuing music and was sent to work as a rice planter on the Huangjin commune. He joined an ensemble of other commune residents and learned to play traditional Chinese string instruments. Following a ferry accident that resulted in the death of several members of a Peking opera troupe, Tan Dun was called upon as a violist and arranger. This initial success earned him a seat in the orchestra, and from there he went to study at the Central Conservatory of Music in Beijing in 1977. While at the Conservatory, Tan Dun came into contact with composers such as Toru Takemitsu, George Crumb, Alexander Goehr, Hans Werner Henze, Isang Yun, and Chou Wen-Chung, all of whom influenced his sense of musical style.

In 1986, he moved to New York City as a doctoral student at Columbia University, once again studying with Chou Wen-Chung, who had studied under Edgard Varèse. At Columbia, Tan Dun discovered the music of composers such as Philip Glass, John Cage, Meredith Monk, and Steve Reich, and began incorporating these influences into his compositions. He completed his dissertation, Death and Fire: Dialogue with Paul Klee, in 1993. Inspired by a visit to the Museum of Modern Art, Death and Fire is a short symphony that engages with the paintings of Paul Klee. On 15 June 2016, he created the Grand Opening Theme Song of Shanghai Disney Resort. He began his tenure as Dean of the Bard College Conservatory of Music on 1 July 2019.

== Music ==
=== Opera ===
During his time at Columbia University, Tan Dun composed his first opera, a setting of nature poems by Qu Yuan called Nine Songs (1989). The poems are sung in both Classical Chinese and contemporary English alongside a small ensemble of Western and Chinese instruments. Among these are a specially built set of 50 ceramic percussion, string, and wind instruments, designed in collaboration with potter Ragnar Naess. To emphasize the shamanistic nature of Qu Yuan's poetry, the actors dance and move in a ritualized manner.

Tan Dun's second work in the genre, Marco Polo (1996), set to a libretto by Paul Griffiths, is an opera within an opera. It begins with the spiritual journey of two characters, Marco and Polo, and their encounters with various historic figures of literature and music, including Dante Alighieri, William Shakespeare, Scheherazade, Sigmund Freud, John Cage, Gustav Mahler, Li Po, and Kublai Khan. These sections are presented in an abstract, Peking opera style. Interwoven with these sections are the travels of the real-life Marco Polo, presented in a Western operatic style. Though the score calls for traditional Western orchestral instrumentation, additional instruments are used to indicate the location of the characters, including recorder, rebec, sitar, tabla, singing bowls, Tibetan horn, sheng, and pipa. The opera won the Grawemeyer Award for Music Composition in 1998.

That same year, Tan Dun premiered his next opera, The Peony Pavilion, an adaptation of Tang Xianzu's 1598 Kunqu play of the same name. Directed by Peter Sellars in its original production, Tan Dun's work is performed entirely in English, though one of the characters must be trained in Peking or Kunqu style. The small ensemble of six musicians performs electronics and Chinese instruments onstage with the actors. Stylistically, the music is a blend of Western avant-garde and Chinese opera.

At this point in his career, Tan Dun had created many works for "organic instruments," i.e. instruments constructed from materials such as paper, water, ceramic, and stone. For his fourth opera, Tea: A Mirror of Soul (2002), co-authored by librettist Xu Ying, organic instruments factor prominently into the structure of the opera itself. The title of each act corresponds to the materials of the instruments being used, as well as the opera's plot. The first act, entitled "Water, Fire", opens with a tea ceremony onstage while percussionists manipulate glass bowls of water. The second act, "Paper", features music on rice paper drums and depicts the characters' search for The Classic of Tea, the first book to codify tea production and preparation in China. The third and final act, "Ceramic, Stones", depicts the death of the protagonist's love. Percussionists play on pitched flowerpots, referred to as "Ceramic chimes" in the score.

Tan Dun's most recent opera, The First Emperor (2006), was commissioned by the Metropolitan Opera with the title role created for Plácido Domingo. Co-authored by Tan Dun and Chinese novelist Ha Jin, the opera focuses on the unification of China under Qin Shi Huang, first emperor of the Qin dynasty, and his relationship with the musician Gao Jianli. Like Tan Dun's previous operas, The First Emperor calls for Chinese instruments in addition to a full orchestra, including guzheng and bianzhong. The original Met production was directed by Zhang Yimou, with whom Tan Dun had collaborated on the film Hero.

=== Film and multimedia ===
Tan Dun earned more widespread attention after composing the score for Ang Lee's Crouching Tiger, Hidden Dragon (2000), for which he won an Academy Award, a Grammy Award, and a BAFTA Award. Other film credits include the aforementioned Hero (Zhang Yimou, 2002), Gregory Hoblit's Fallen (1998), and Feng Xiaogang's The Banquet (2006).

Following the composition of the film score for Crouching Tiger, Hidden Dragon, Tan Dun rearranged the music to create the Crouching Tiger Concerto for cello, video, and chamber orchestra. Containing edited footage from the film, this work reverses the role of music in film by treating video as secondary. This same technique was later applied to his film scores for Hero and The Banquet, resulting in the larger work known as the Martial Arts Cycle.

In 2002, Tan Dun continued experimenting with application of video in music The Map, also for cello, video, and orchestra. The Map features documentary footage depicting the lives of China's Tujia, Miao, and Dong ethnic minorities. The musicians onstage, including the cello soloist, interact with the musicians onscreen—a duet of live and recorded performance. The work was premiered and commissioned by the Boston Symphony Orchestra with Yo-Yo Ma.

Tan Dun's most recent multimedia work, Nu Shu: The Secret Songs of Women (2013), is a 13-movement work for video, solo harp, and orchestra. Following years of ethnomusicological research in Hunan, the work captures the sounds of Nüshu script, a phonetic writing system devised by women speakers of the Xiangnan Tuhua dialect who had been disallowed from receiving formal education. Considered a dying language, Tan Dun's research resulted in a series of short films of women singing songs written in Nüshu, which are presented alongside the orchestral performance. As with The Map, the songs in the video are used in counterpoint to the live music.

=== Orchestral Theatre series ===
In the 1990s, Tan Dun began working on a series of orchestral pieces that would analyze the relationship between performer and audience by synthesizing Western classical music and Chinese ritual. According to the composer,

If we look at the idea of 'art music' with its firm separation of performer and audience, we see that its history is comparatively short. Yet the history of music as an integral part of spiritual life, as ritual, as partnership in enjoyment and spirit, is as old as humanity itself.

In the first piece of the series, Orchestral Theatre I: O (1990), members of the orchestra make various vocalizations—chanting nonsense syllables, for instance—while playing their instruments using atypical techniques. For examples, the harp is played as a gushing, and the violins are played as percussion instruments.

Orchestral Theatre II: Re (1992) expands the concept of ritual by involving the audience. The orchestra is split, with the strings, brass, and percussion onstage, while the woodwinds surround the audience. The score also calls for two conductors, with one facing the stage, and the other facing the audience. The latter conductor cues the audience to hum along with the orchestra in certain sections of the music. The work's namesake derives from humming the solfège pitch "re".

The third piece in the series, Red Forecast (Orchestral Theatre III) (1996), involves more staging elements than its predecessors, adding television monitors, lighting, and even stage directions for the musicians. In this multimedia work, the orchestra is led by both a human conductor and a virtual conductor who appears on the monitors. While the human conductor leads, the monitors depict a variety of images from the 1960s and the Cold War: a collage of Mao Zedong, the Cultural Revolution, Martin Luther King Jr., John F. Kennedy, The Beatles, Nikita Khrushchev, and hydrogen bomb testing. In addition to the video, an audio recording of a weather forecast is played.

The final piece in the series, The Gate (Orchestral Theatre IV) (1999), focuses on three women of literary fame: Yu from The Hegemon-King Bids His Concubine Farewell, Juliet from Romeo and Juliet, and Koharu from The Love Suicides at Amijima. Based on the theme of sacrifice for love, The Gate is structured as a theme and variations. The style of each section corresponds to its respective character's country of origin. Additionally, Yu is played by a Peking opera singer (Shi Min), Juliet by a Western opera soprano (Nancy Allen Lundy), and Koharu by a Japanese puppeteer (Jusaburō Tsujimura). As in Orchestra Theatre II: Re, the orchestra is distributed onstage and amongst the audience. The Gate also incorporates video, but unlike the prerecorded images used in Red Forecast, a projection screen displays live images of the three actress-soloists, manipulated in real time by a video artist. The video artist for the 1999 premiere was Elaine J. McCarthy.

=== Organic music ===
Many of Tan Dun's works call for instruments made of materials such as paper, stone, or water, but the compositions that he classifies as "organic music" feature these instruments most prominently. The first major work for organic instruments was his Water Concerto for Water Percussion and Orchestra (1998), dedicated to Toru Takemitsu. According to the composer, the sounds made by the soloist are inspired by the sounds of everyday life growing up in Hunan. Basins are filled with water, and the contents are manipulated with bowls, bottles, hands, and other devices. Other water instruments used include the waterphone. Various means of amplification are used, including contact microphones on the basins.

The techniques devised in the Water Concerto were used again in Tan Dun's Water Passion After St. Matthew (2000). Written to commemorate the 250th anniversary of the death of Johann Sebastian Bach, the work for chorus, orchestra, and water percussion follows the Gospel of Matthew, beginning with Christ's baptism. The chorus doubles on tingsha, and the soprano and bass soloists double on xun. The score also requires Mongolian overtone singing from the soloists. As with Orchestral Theatre I: O, members of the orchestra play their instruments with techniques borrowed from non-Western traditions.

Tan Dun's next major organic work, Paper Concerto for Paper Percussion and Orchestra (2003), explores the acoustic range of paper. Instruments constructed from differing thicknesses of paper are used as cymbals, drums, or reeds. Additionally, sheets of paper are shaken or struck. These sounds are amplified primarily through wireless microphones worn by the musicians. This work was commissioned by the Los Angeles Philharmonic for the opening of the Walt Disney Concert Hall.

Earth Concerto for stone and ceramic percussion and orchestra (2009) draws from Gustav Mahler's Das Lied von der Erde (The Song of the Earth), which in turn draws from the poetry of Li Po. Ceramic instruments include percussion instruments similar to those Tan Dun had used in previous works, as well as wind instruments and xun.

=== Symphonies, concertos, and chamber works ===
In the mid-1990s, Tan Dun began working on another series of orchestral works known as the Yi series, named for the I Ching (Yi Jing in pinyin). Each numbered work in the series builds upon the original, Yi°: Concerto for Orchestra (published 2002), by adding a solo instrument. The first concerto in the series, Yi1: Intercourse of Fire and Water (1994), was written for and premiered by cellist Anssi Karttunen. The second work, Yi2: Concerto for Guitar and Orchestra (1996), combines flamenco and pipa techniques and was premiered by Sharon Isbin.

Originally titled Secret Land, Tan Dun wrote a concerto for 12 solo cellos and orchestra called Four Secret Roads of Marco Polo (2004). Commissioned and premiered by the Berlin Philharmonic, the work is a musical exploration of the Silk Road. To achieve these sounds, the cello soloists employ sitar and pipa techniques.

Tan Dun wrote a concerto for Lang Lang titled Piano Concerto: "The Fire" (2008), a commission by the New York Philharmonic. The concerto is reportedly inspired by the composer's love for martial arts, and the soloist is instructed to play certain passages of the music with fists and forearms. Other more tranquil sections evoke ancient Chinese instruments such as the guqin.

In 2008, Tan Dun was commissioned by Google and YouTube to write an inaugural symphony for the YouTube Symphony Orchestra (YTSO) project. The resultant work, Internet Symphony No. 1 "Eroica", was recorded by the London Symphony Orchestra and uploaded to YouTube in November 2008, thus beginning the open call for video audition submissions. Voted on by members of the YouTube community as well as professional musicians, the YTSO was assembled of 96 musicians from over 30 countries. In April 2009, a mashup video of the submissions was premiered at Carnegie Hall, followed by a live performance of the work.

Tan Dun has also conducted the BBC Scottish Symphony to record parts of the album Away from Xuan by fellow composer Chen Yuanlin, released in 2009.

He composed a symphonic poem for piano for pianist Yuja Wang titled "Farewell My Concubine for Peking Opera Soprano and Piano". The work was commissioned by the Guangzhou Symphony Orchestra and made its world premiere on 31 July 2015 in Xinghai Concert Hall with the orchestra conducted by Long Yu and Wang as piano soloist.

=== Theatre-inspired works ===
Though not explicitly opera, many of Tan Dun's works borrow operatic elements, in terms of both melody and staging. For example, his violin concerto, Out of Peking Opera (1987, revised 1994), quotes jinghu fiddling music often heard in Peking opera. Additionally, Ghost Opera (1994), for pipa and string quartet, includes minimal sets and lighting. Originally composed on commission for Kronos Quartet and Wu Man, Ghost Opera has been performed globally and recorded by Kronos for Nonesuch Records.

== List of compositions ==
Some of the generic classifications included below are Tan Dun's own concepts, including "organic music" and "music ritual." "Organic music" refers to musical works performed on non-traditional instruments, typically involving organic materials such as paper, water, or stone. "Music ritual" refers to works derived from Chinese spiritual traditions.

=== Opera ===
- Marco Polo (1995)
- Peony Pavilion (1998)
- Tea: A Mirror of Soul (2002)
- The First Emperor (2006)
- Peony Pavilion (2010)

=== Symphonic works and concertos ===
- Self Portrait, from "Death and Fire" (1983)
- On Taoism (1985)
- Out of Peking Opera (1987)
- Death and Fire: Dialogue with Paul Klee (1992)
- Concerto for Pizzicato Piano and Ten Instruments (1995)
- Heaven Earth Mankind: Symphony 1997 (1997)
- Overture: Dragon and Phoenix, from Heaven Earth Mankind (1997)
- Requiem and Lullaby, from Heaven Earth Mankind (1997)
- Song of Peace, from Heaven Earth Mankind (1997)
- Yi1: Intercourse of Fire and Water (1994)
- Yi2: Concerto for Guitar and Orchestra (1996)
- 2000 Today: A World Symphony for the Millennium (1999)
- Concerto for String Orchestra and Pipa (1999)
- Concerto for String Orchestra and Zheng (1999)
- Yi°: Concerto for Orchestra (2002)
- Four Secret Roads of Marco Polo (2004)
- Piano Concerto: "The Fire" (2008)
- Internet Symphony (2009)
- Symphony for Strings (2009)
- Symphonic Poem on 3 Notes (2011)
- Atonal Rock n' Roll (2012)
- Concerto for Orchestra (2012)
- Percussion Concerto: "The Tears of Nature" (2012)
- Double Bass Concerto: "Wolf Totem" (2015)
- Passacaglia: Secret of Wind and Birds (2015)
- Farewell My Concubine for Peking Opera Soprano and Piano (2015)

=== Chamber and solo music ===
- Eight Memories in Watercolor, for piano (1978, 2002)
- Eight Colors for String Quartet (1986)
- In Distance (1987)
- Silk Road, for soprano, voice, and percussion (1989)
- Traces, for piano (1989, 1992)
- Elegy: Snow in June, for cello and percussion (1991)
- Circle with Four Trios, Conductor and Audience (1992)
- Lament: Autumn Wind (1993)
- C A G E, for solo piano (1994)
- A Sinking Love, for soprano and 4 violas da gamba (1995)
- Concerto for Six (1997)
- Concerto for String Quartet and Pipa (1999)
- Dew Drop Falls, for solo piano (2000)
- Seven Desires for Guitar (2002)
- Secret Land, for 12 cellos (2006)
- Violin Concerto: The Love (2009)
- Chiacone—after Colombi, for solo cello (2010)
- Crouching Tiger Sonata for cello and piano (2016)

=== Organic music ===
- Water Concerto for water percussion and orchestra (1998)
- Paper Concerto for paper percussion and orchestra (2003)
- Water Music (2004)
- Earth Concerto for stone and ceramic percussion with orchestra (2009)

=== Music ritual ===
- Nine Songs (1989)
- Orchestral Theatre I: O (1990)
- Orchestral Theatre II: Re (1992)
- Ghost Opera
- Red Forecast (Orchestra Theatre III) (1996)
- The Gate (Orchestral Theatre IV) (1999)
- Buddha Passion (2018)

=== Oratorio ===
- Water Passion (2000)

=== Movie scores ===
- Don't Cry, Nanking (1995)
- Fallen (1998)
- Crouching Tiger, Hidden Dragon (2000)
- Hero (2002)
- The Banquet (2010)

=== Multimedia ===
- Crouching Tiger Concerto, for cello and chamber orchestra (2000)
- The Map: Concerto for Cello, Video and Orchestra (2002)
- Hero Concerto (2010)
- The Banquet (2010)
- Martial Arts Cycle (2013)
- Nu Shu: The Secret Songs of Women (2013)

== Recordings ==
=== CD ===
Recordings of compositions by Tan Dun
Year	Title	Performers	Label
1990	Nine Songs: Ritual Opera	Crossings Ensemble and Chorus	CRI
1993	Snow in June	Ed Spanjaard, Arditti Quartet, Nieuw Ensemble, Talujon Percussion Quartet, Susan Botti, Paul Guergerian, Keri-Lynn Wilson, Gillian Benet, Anssi Karttunen	CRI
1994	On Taoism / Orchestral Theatre I / Death and Fire — Dialogue with Paul Klee	BBC Scottish Symphony Orchestra	Koch Schwann
1996	Chinese Traditional and Contemporary Music	Wu Man & Ensemble	Nimbus Records
1997	Ghost Opera	Kronos Quartet, Wu Man, George Crumb	Nonesuch Records
1997	Heaven Earth Mankind: Symphony 1997	Yo-Yo Ma	Sony Classical
1997	Marco Polo: An Opera in an Opera	Netherlands Radio Kamerorkest, Cappella Amsterdam	Sony Classical
1999	Bitter Love (selections from Peony Pavilion)	Ying Huang	Sony Classical
1999	2000 Today: A World Symphony for the New Millenium	BBC Concert Orchestra	Sony Classical
2000	Under the Silver Moon	Susan Glaser, Emily Mitchell, Matthew Gold, Stephanie Griffin	Koch International Classics
2001	Crouching Tiger, Hidden Dragon	Shanghai Symphony Orchestra, Shanghai National Orchestra, Shanghai Percussion Ensemble, Yo-Yo Ma, Coco Lee	Sony Classical
2001	Rouse: Concert de Gaudi / Tan Dun: Concerto for Guitar and Orchestra	Sharon Isbin, Muhai Tang, Gulbenkian Orchestra	Teldec
2002	Out of Peking Opera / Death and Fire / Orchestra Theatre II: Re	Cho-Liang Lin, Muhai Tang, Helsinki Philharmonic Orchestra	Ondine
2002	Water Passion After St. Matthew	Maya Beiser, Mark O'Connor, Elizabeth Keusch, Stephen Bryant, RIAS Kammerchor	Sony Classical
2004	Hero (soundtrack)	Kodo, You Yan, Liu Li, Itzhak Perlman	Sony Classical
2004	Lang Lang: Live at Carnegie Hall (includes Tan Dun's Eight Memories in Watercolor)	Lang Lang	DG
2006	Majestic Charm	Singapore Chinese Orchestra	–
2006	The Banquet (soundtrack)	–	–
2008	Sticks and Stones: Music for Percussion and Strings (features Tan Dun's Snow in June)	Marjorie Bagley, Roger Braun, Michael Carrera, Kristin Agee, Seth Haines, Joseph van Hassel, Steven Huang	Equilibrium
2008	Tan Dun: Pipa Concerto / Hayashi: Viola Concerto / Takemitsu: Nostalghia	Roman Balashov, Wu Man, Yuri Bashmet, Moscow Soloists	Onyx Classics
2011	Bach to Tan Dun (includes Tan Dun's Eight Memories in Watercolor)	Beijing Guitar Duo (Su Meng & Wang Yameng)	Tonar Music
2011	Martial Arts Trilogy	Yo-Yo Ma, Lang Lang, Itzhak Perlman	Sony Classical
2012	Concerto for Orchestra	Hong Kong Philharmonic Orchestra	Naxos Records
2015	The Tears of Nature	Martin Grubinger	–

=== DVD ===
- Crouching Tiger, Hidden Dragon (2001)
- Hero (2004)
- Lang Lang: Live at Carnegie Hall (2004)
- The Map (2004)
- Tea: A Mirror of Soul (2005)
- The Banquet (2006)
- The First Emperor: Metropolitan Opera (2008)
- Marco Polo (2009)
- Paper Concerto: Royal Stockholm Philharmonic Orchestra (2009)
- Water Concerto: Royal Stockholm Philharmonic Orchestra (2009)

== Awards and honors ==
- Second prize at the Dresden International Weber Chamber Music Composition Competition, 1983, String Quartet: Feng Ya Song
- Academy Award, Best Original Score, Crouching Tiger, Hidden Dragon
- Grammy Award, Best Soundtrack, Crouching Tiger, Hidden Dragon
- BAFTA Award for Best Film Music, Crouching Tiger, Hidden Dragon
- Grawemeyer Award, Music Composition, Marco Polo
- Musical America Composer of the Year, 2003
- Shostakovich Award, 2012
- Bach Prize of the Free and Hanseatic City of Hamburg, 2011
- Musikpreis der Stadt Duisburg, 2005
- The Eugene McDermott Award in the Arts, 1994
- The Glenn Gould Protégé prize, 1996
