= Lam Bun-Ching =

Hong Kong composer

Lam Bun-Ching (Chinese: 林品晶; Jyutping: Lam^{4} Ban^{2} Jing^{1}; b. Macau, 1954) is a Chinese American composer, pianist, and conductor.

== Early Life and Training ==
Lam holds a B.A. degree in piano performance from the Chinese University of Hong Kong (1976). She obtained a scholarship from the University of California at San Diego, where she studied composition with Bernard Rands, Robert Erickson, Roger Reynolds, and Pauline Oliveros, earning a Ph.D.

== Career ==
In 1981, she was invited to join the music faculty of the Cornish College of the Arts in Seattle, where she taught until 1986. She has also served as the Jean MacDuff Vaux Composer-in-Residence at Mills College in Oakland, California, and in 1997 she served as a visiting professor of composition at Yale University and at Bennington College in Vermont.

Her music has been recorded on the CRI, Tzadik, Nimbus, Koch International Classics, Sound Aspect, and Tellus labels.

Lam divides her time between Paris and New York.

== Works ==
- Chamber opera Wenji: Eighteen Songs of a Nomad Flute "文姬" 2002 to a libretto bu Xu Ying.
