= Nancy Maultsby =

American operatic mezzo-soprano

Nancy Maultsby (Burlington, North Carolina) is an American operatic mezzo-soprano.

She has performed often with Lyric Opera of Chicago, where she appeared as Erda in Das Rheingold and Siegfried, as well as the First Norn and Waltraute in Götterdämmerung, all conducted by Zubin Mehta. She also sang La Cieca in La Gioconda there conducted by Bruno Bartoletti and Pauline in Pique Dame conducted by Sir Andrew Davis, both of which opened the company's season. She appeared as Erda in both Das Rheingold and Siegfried and Waltraute in Götterdämmerung in the new Stephen Wadsworth Der Ring des Nibelungen with Seattle Opera. She has sung Fricka at Stuttgart Opera; Jocasta in Igor Stravinsky's Oedipus Rex in Naples, Rome, Dresden and Athens; Charlotte, Carmen and Orlovsky at Seattle Opera; Maddalena at the Netherlands Opera; Amneris with Minnesota Opera, Michigan Opera Theater, Palm Beach Opera and at the National Theater Athens; Ottavia in Athens; Cornelia in Giulio Cesare at Florida Grand Opera and Opera Colorado; Maddalena at the Netherlands Opera; and Adalgisa in Genoa. Other operatic engagements have included productions of Die Ägyptische Helena at the Royal Opera, Covent Garden (under Christian Thielemann); Carmen at San Francisco Opera and Pittsburgh Opera; and productions at the Teatro Colón, Buenos Aires and Santa Fe Opera. A recent addition to her repertoire is Judith in Béla Bartók's Bluebeard's Castle which she sang in the acclaimed Robert Lepage production for her debut at the Opéra de Montréal, where she subsequently returned as Amneris.

== Recordings ==
- Purcell: Dido and Aeneas Nancy Maultsby (Dido), Russell Braun (Aeneas), Susannah Waters (Belinda); Boston Baroque (ensemble), Martin Pearlman (conductor). Label: Telarc
- Max Bruch: Odysseus Jeffrey Kneebone, Nancy Maultsby, Camilla Nylund (soloists); NDR North German Radio Philharmonic Orchestra and NDR Chor, Leon Botstein (conductor). Label: Koch-Schwann

In addition to her recordings of Elijah, Odyseus and Telarc's highly acclaimed recording of Mozart's Requiem - the premiere recording on period instruments with the Boston Baroque - Nancy Maultsby can be heard on Telarc's recording of Dido and Aeneas, also with the Boston Baroque. She is featured on box sets honoring Christoph von Dohnányi and the Cleveland Orchestra (G. Mahler 2nd) and Kurt Masur at the New York Philharmonic Orchestra (Debussy's St. Sebastian). Her recent recordings include the Lamentation from L. Bernstein's Symphony No. 1 (“Jeremiah”) with Robert Spano and the Atlanta Symphony Orchestra for Telarc, Richard Yardumian's Symphony No. 2 with the Singapore Symphony on BIS, and Wagner opera excerpts on Naxos.

== Sources ==
- Cummings, David (ed.), "Maultsby, Nancy", International Who's Who in Classical Music, Routledge, 2003, p. 518. ISBN 1-85743-174-X
- Pittsburgh Post-Gazette, "Mezzo Magnetic: Nancy Maultsby Brings Charisma to the Role of Carmen" November 14, 1997, p. 32
- Tommasini, Anthony, "A Modernized 'Messiah,' In Mozart's Brazen Way", New York Times, August 27, 1996, p. C10
