= Ed Spanjaard =

Dutch conductor and pianist

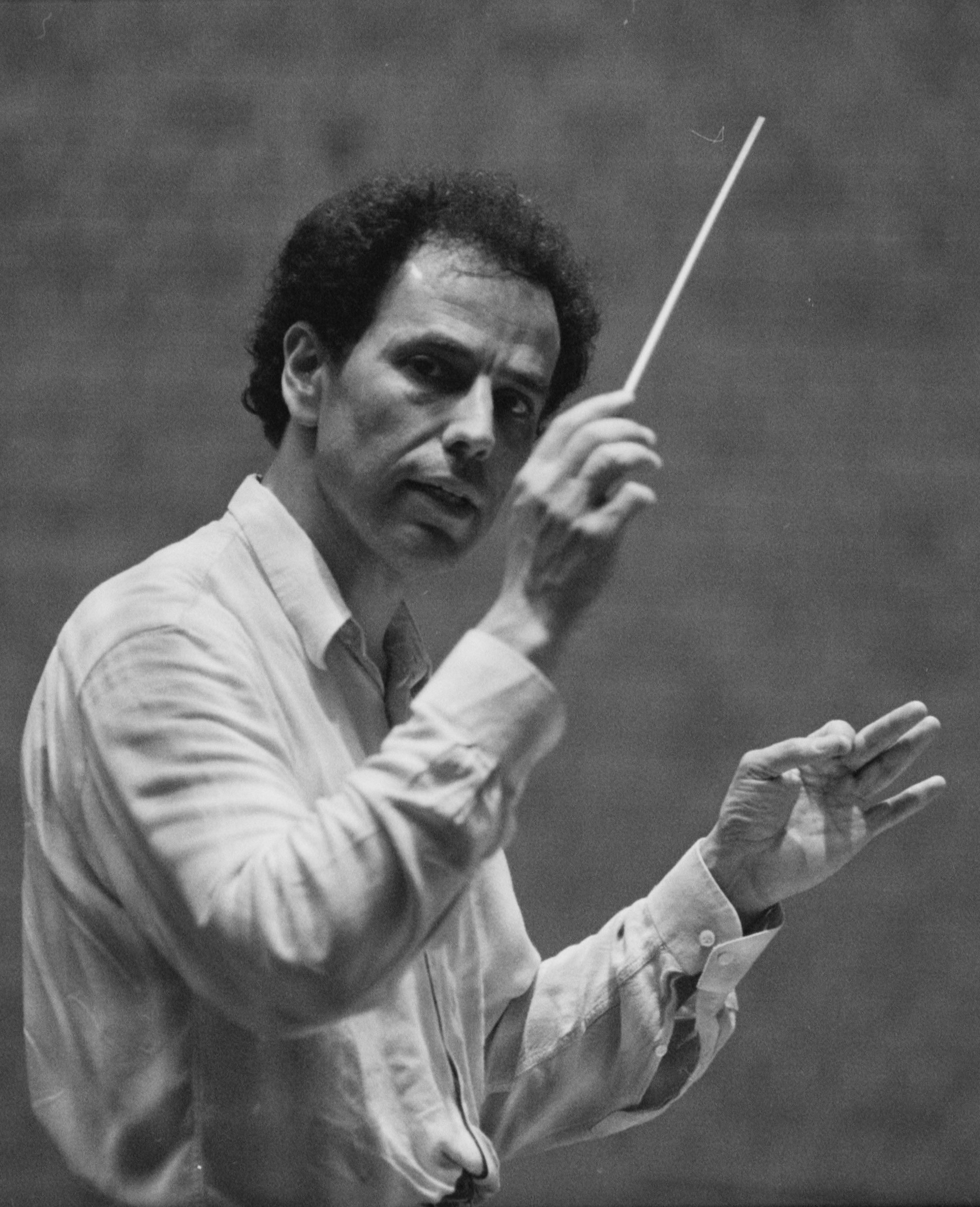
- Spanjaard in 1997

Background information
- Born: 22 December 1948 (age 77); Haarlem, Netherlands
- Genres: Classical, contemporary
- Occupations: Conductor, pianist
- Instruments: Piano, viola
- Years active: 1975–present
- Website: edspanjaard.nl

Eduard Philip Spanjaard (born 22 December 1948), known professionally as Ed Spanjaard, is a Dutch conductor and pianist.

== Early life ==
Spanjaard was born in 1948 in Haarlem. His father was a psychiatrist and amateur pianist, and his mother a flautist and music teacher. Spanjaard studied at the Conservatorium van de Vereniging Muzieklyceum at Amsterdam, and then at the Guildhall School of Music and Drama in London. During his studies he was, in addition to conducting amateur ensembles like the Leids Studenten Kamer Orkest (LeSKO), assistant to Bernard Haitink, Georg Solti, and Herbert von Karajan.

== Career ==
In London, Spanjaard worked as répétiteur of the Royal Opera Covent Garden. In 1978, he conducted the London Philharmonic Orchestra in Mozart's Così fan tutte during the Glyndebourne Festival. In 1980 and 1981 he was assistant-conductor to Herbert von Karajan at the Salzburg Festival. For the Bayreuth Festival in 1983, he was the assistant of Georg Solti in Wagner's Der Ring des Nibelungen, which laid the foundation for his work in the opera. For several years, he was principal guest conductor of the Nederlands Balletorkest and the Limburgs Symfonie Orkest (LSO) (1982–1988), and has directed almost all Dutch orchestras. Since 1982 Spanjaard has been principal conductor of the Nieuw Ensemble, which was awarded the Prins Bernardfonds muziekprijs in 1998.

As guest conductor Spajaard performed all over the world. In recent years he has conducted in the contemporary and classical repertoire. In the Netherlands he directed Verdi's Rigoletto with the De Nederlandse Opera, Gounod's Faust and Verdi's Don Carlos with the Nederlandse Reisopera and with the Opera Zuid Puccini's La bohème and Madama Butterfly as well as Humperdinck's Hänsel und Gretel. Also with the Residentie Orkest and abroad (Canada) he made several opera productions. In 2000 at the Rotterdam Ahoy he conducted the Nederlands Balletorkest in Verdi's La traviata and Britten's Peter Grimes with the Nederlandse Reisopera. He premiered the chamber-operas Wolf Cub Village and Night Banquet by Chinese composer Guo Wenjing with the New Ensemble. In 2004, he was invited by the Opéra National de Lyon to conduct the opera Pelléas et Mélissande from Claude Debussy.

During a state visit of Queen Beatrix in 1995, Spanjaard conducted Mahler's Lieder aus Des Knaben Wunderhorn and symphony No. 1 in cooperation with the Israel Philharmonic Orchestra. He regularly performs with the Ensemble intercontemporain in Paris and with the Klangforum Wien. In 2000 he conducted the Ensemble Modern in Frankfurt am Main, with great success which was praised by the press. In February 2002 Spanjaard took care of the musical accompaniment for the wedding of Prince Willem-Alexander and Máxima Zorreguieta. She was particularly moved by "Adiós Nonino" by Astor Piazzolla with Carel Kraayenhof on bandoneon. The success of the performance led to another CD recording with the same performers, including the Concertgebouw Kamerorkest and the Nederlands Kamerkoor.

In August 2001 Spanjaard was appointed chief conductor of the Limburgs Symfonie Orkest. Together with the LSO he performed Hans Zender's composed interpretation of Schubert's Winterreise in September 2003 during the Musica Sacra festival in Maastricht. This performance received praise from the national press and was considered the highlight of the festival. A CD recording of the LSO and the Nederlands Kamerkoor with compositions by Gabriel Fauré was also highly praised.

In 2009 Spanjaard conducted Das Rheingold, of Wagner's Der Ring des Nibelungen with the Nederlandse Reisopera and Orkest van het Oosten in Enschede where in 2010 he conducted Die Walküre. In July 2016 Spanjaard was appointed chief conductor of Orkest van het Oosten starting from season 2017–2018, following Jan Willem de Vriend.

Spanjaard was appointed Professor of Orchestral Conducting at the Amsterdam University of the Arts in September 2012.

== Recordings ==
- Tango Royal. Works by Astor Piazzolla, Carel Kraayenhof, Roberto D. Alvarez. Ed Spanjaard, Vesko Eschkenazy, Concertgebouw Chamber Orchestra, Sexteto Canyengue. PENTATONE PTC 5186008 (2012)
- Mozart – Arias. Lenneke Ruiten, Ed Spanjaard, Concertgebouw Chamber Orchestra. PENTATONE PTC 5186376 (2010)
- Richard Wagner. Wesendonck Lieder & Arias, Charlotte Margiono, Ed Spanjaard, Philharmonie Zuidnederland. PENTATONE PTC 5186077 (2006)
- Gabriel Fauré. Requiem and other choral works. Christiane Oelze, Ed Spanjaard, Harry Peeters, Philharmonie Zuidnederland, Netherlands Chamber Choir. PENTATONE PTC 5186020 (2005)

== Awards ==
- Prins Bernhardfonds muziekprijs 1998
- Edison Award 1999
- Edison Award 2001
