= Marco Polo (opera) =

1996 opera by Tan Dun

- Opera by Tan Dun
- Librettist: Paul Griffiths
- Language: English
- Premiere: 7 May 1996; Munich Biennale

Marco Polo is an opera in two acts by the Chinese-born composer Tan Dun with an English libretto by the writer and critic Paul Griffiths. It premiered at the Munich Biennale on 7 May 1996 in a staging by Martha Clarke.

The work divides the title figure into two characters—Marco (mezzo-soprano) and Polo (tenor)—and interleaves a spiritual “Book of Timespace” with episodes inspired by the Venetian’s travels. The scoring combines standard Western orchestra and chorus with instruments associated with the cultures evoked in the drama, including pipa, sheng, tabla and Tibetan horns.

Marco Polo received the 1998 Grawemeyer Award for Music Composition. Notable productions include the United States premiere at New York City Opera in November 1997, a 2008 staging by De Nederlandse Opera in Amsterdam (issued on DVD/Blu‑ray), and a 2013 production for the Bergen International Festival.

== Background and composition ==
The opera originated in a late-1980s commission from the Edinburgh International Festival. Although intended for Edinburgh, the completed work premiered at the 1996 Munich Biennale. Griffiths’s earlier novel Myself and Marco Polo has been cited in connection with the opera’s genesis, although the libretto is not a direct adaptation.

== Performance history ==
Marco Polo began as a commission by the Edinburgh International Festival in the late 1980s. However, it was not completed until 1995 and received its first performance at the Munich Biennale on 7 May 1996 directed by Martha Clarke. Its US premiere followed on 8 November 1997 at the New York City Opera. Marco Polo was first seen in the UK in November 1998 in a concert performance at the Huddersfield Contemporary Music Festival. Its most recent revival was a November 2008 production at De Nederlandse Opera in Amsterdam.

== Roles ==
- Memory: Polo (tenor)
- Being 1: Marco (mezzo-soprano)
- Being 2: Kublai Khan (bass)
- Nature: Water (soprano)
- Shadow 1: Rustichello/Li Po (tenor)
- Shadow 2: Sheherazada/Mahler/Queen (mezzo-soprano)
- Shadow 3: Dante/Shakespeare (baritone)

== Synopsis ==
The opera presents Marco Polo’s expedition as three overlapping journeys: physical travel from an Italian piazza toward China’s Great Wall, a spiritual “Book of Timespace” (Winter–Spring–Summer–Autumn) in which “shadows” of historical figures appear, and a parallel musical journey. Marco embodies action and being, while Polo embodies memory. The three strands converge at the Great Wall, a symbolic threshold the merged “Marco Polo” must cross.

== Recordings ==
- Marco Polo (CD Sony 62912) - World premiere recording with Thomas Young and Alexandra Montano in the title roles, the Cappella Amsterdam, and the Netherlands Radio Chamber Orchestra conducted by the composer. Recorded live at Yakult Hall, Amsterdam on 20 June 1996.
- Marco Polo (DVD Opus Arte OA1010D) - The 2008 production of the opera by De Nederlandse Opera, with Charles Workman and Sarah Castle in the title roles and conducted by the composer.

== Sources ==
- G. Schirmer, Tan Dun: Marco Polo, programme notes. Accessed 31 August 2009.
- Kerner, Leighton (November 11, 1997). "Mind voyager". The Village Voice.
- Smith, Patrick J. (December 20, 1997). "Tan Dun: Marco Polo". Opera News. Archived from the original on October 26, 2012 – via HighBeam Research.
- White, Michael, "Huddersfield, centre of the musical universe", The Independent, 29 November 1998. Accessed 31 August 2009.
