= Guo Wenjing =

Chinese composer and educator (born 1956)

- Chinese: 郭文景
Transcriptions
Standard Mandarin
- Hanyu Pinyin: Guō Wénjǐng

Guo Wenjing (born 1 February 1956, in Chongqing) is a Chinese composer and educator.

Guo Wenjing is a contemporary Chinese composer. Unlike many Chinese composers who have studied and lived in other countries, he has only studied in Beijing. He has lived and worked in his home country for nearly his entire life with the exception of a short period of time living in New York. However, over the years he has had many works commissioned around the world. He and his music have appeared at the Beijing Music Festival, Edinburgh Festival, Hong Kong Arts Festival, Holland Music Festival, New York Lincoln Center Festival, Paris Autumn Festival, Perth International Arts Festival, Almeida Theatre (London), Frankfurt Opera (Germany), Konzerthaus Berlin (Germany), Kennedy Center (Washington), as well as Turin, Warsaw, etc. In addition, he is contracted by CASA RICORDI-BMG and the first composer to be contracted by People's Music Publishing House. His music has been given high praise both at home and abroad by The New York Times, Le Monde, The Guardian, People’s Music, etc.^{1}

== Biography ==
He began attending the Central Conservatory of Music, Beijing in 1978, the year of that institution's reopening, and later served as the head of the composition department there; he remains on the faculty.

== Works ==
He has composed for both Western and Chinese instruments. His works include concertos for erhu and bamboo flute, and an opera based on the life of the Tang dynasty poet Li Bai. He composed the score to several films, including Blush (1995), In the Heat of the Sun (1994), and Zhang Yimou's Riding Alone for Thousands of Miles (2005).

Guo's music is published by Casa Ricordi. It has been performed by the Nieuw Ensemble, Atlas Ensemble, Cincinnati Percussion Group, Kronos Quartet, Arditti Quartet, Ensemble Modern, Hong Kong Chinese Orchestra, Göteborg Symphony Orchestra, China Philharmonic Orchestra, Guangzhou Symphony Orchestra, and Hong Kong Philharmonic Orchestra.

Guo Wenjing's music is filled with the spirit of humanism and has many oriental features.

His chamber opera Wolf Cub Village (1994) was created based on Lu Xun’s short story "Diary of a Madman". This opera’s libretto, written in Chinese, exaggerated the features of Mandarin pronunciation. This exaggerated pronunciation expresses the bleak mood and recalcitrant spirit of the opera quite vividly, strongly, and impressively. Le Monde compared his “masterpiece of madness” to Berg's Wozzeck and Shostakovich's The Nose.^{2}

The opera, Night Banquet, based on the story written by Zou Jingzhi, a Chinese playwright. The author was inspired by Night Revels of Han Xizai, a court figure painting of the Southern Tang dynasty. In the opera, Guo Wenjing has combined features of Italian opera and characteristics of ancient Chinese humanities perfectly. It has been performed in China, Europe, Russia, and the United States.

In the opera, Feng Yi Ting, Guo Wenjing added several Chinese traditional instruments and the elements from Peking opera and Sichuan opera into the western orchestra and opera format. The Charleston Post and Courier reviewed that “Feng Yi Ting plays like a traditional Chinese theater piece. On one level, that is, because on another very interesting level, it offers a deeper, poignant perspective on tradition vs. transition, on cross-pollination of cultures, on the age of globalization itself.”^{3} In the article “All the World On a Stage In America” by The New York Times, the opera was described as using “both Chinese and Western approaches to timbre, melody and hormone, oscillating between the styles and combining them with dazzling fluidity. …”^{4}

His other opera works, Poet Li Bai, Mu Guiying, and Hua Mulan, also use Mandarin librettos and focus on exploring the possibility and potential of combining Chinese art and Western opera.

His chamber music, Drama (1995) for three percussionists was written to sound like a Chinese drama. Although there are three percussionists, it uses only one type of percussion instrument, the Chinese cymbals. The composer innovated many creative articulations for three pairs of Chinese cymbals. Furthermore, he requires performers to speak and sing as well.

Chou Kong Shan is Guo Wenjing's concerto for Chinese bamboo flute. This work is a large-scale Chinese instrument concerto. It has three movements and requires three kinds of bamboo flutes, one for each movement. Each movement has a distinct personality and uses the distinct timbre of each flute to express its personality. It also plays an important role in promoting the development of the instrument and its performance techniques.

Shu Dao Nan (1987) is a symphonic poem by Guo Wenjing inspired by Li Bai's poetry. Shu includes the Sichuan province and modern day Chongqing of China, Guo Wenjing's hometown. The piece features regional and cultural factors such as Sichuan folk music.

Guo Wenjing has also composed many film scores (examples). Additionally, he is featured in the music composed for the opening ceremony of the 2008 Beijing Olympics.

=== Operas ===
- Wolf Cub Village after "Diary of a Madman"
- Poet Li Bai
- Night Banquet
- Mu Guiying
- Hua Mulan
- Feng Y Ting
- Rickshaw Boy 2014
