= Tea: A Mirror of Soul =

2002 Chinese-language western-style opera by Tan Dun

Tea: A Mirror of Soul (Chinese 茶 "tea") is a 2002 Chinese-language western-style opera by Tan Dun, to a libretto by the composer and Peking opera librettist Xu Ying. The opera was commissioned by Suntory Hall in Tokyo, Japan and was given its world premiere performance there in English. The United States premiere, also in English, was given on July 21, 2007 at the Santa Fe Opera in Santa Fe, New Mexico.

== Roles ==
SEIKYO, Japanese Monk (discovery/philosophy): Baritone

LAN, Chinese Princess/ Puppet Monk (love): Soprano

PRINCE, Chinese Prince/ Puppet Monkey King (anger): Tenor

EMPEROR, Father of Lan/ Shadow (tradition/culture): Bass

LU, Shadow/ Ritualist/ Daughter of Tea Sage Luyu (tea/messenger for spirit): Contralto

MONKS CHANTING (religion): Bass-Baritone Chorus

THREE PERCUSSIONISTS (nature): Water, Paper, Ceramic Instruments

ORCHESTRA (drama)

== Synopsis ==
=== Act I ===
Kyoto, Japan. Ancient times. Japanese tea ceremony inside a temple tea garden. High monk Seikyo raises an empty teapot, passes an empty bowl, and savors empty tea ritualistically. Chanting monks ask why he savors the tea from emptiness. Seikyo, a Prince by birth, relates that ten years ago he became a monk because of his bitter love...

Ten years earlier. ChangAn, ancient Chinese capital. Family bliss inside the palace. Beautiful Princess Lan and her brother the Prince perform for their father. Seikyo enters and the Emperor receives him with surprise. They speak of fond memories. Seikyo expresses his wish to marry Lan. The Emperor hesitates, and asks Seikyo to recite a tea poem. The Prince angrily expresses his disapproval. Seikyo's excellence at reciting leads the Emperor to consent.

Amidst a Chinese tea ceremony, a Persian arrives, offering a thousand horses in exchange for one book: The Book of Tea. Treasured secrets fill this book of wisdom. The Prince, who possesses this book, reluctantly retrieves it from his sleeve. Seikyo expresses doubt that this is the true book shown him by its author, his teacher the Tea Sage Luyu. Angry and jealous, the Prince challenges Seikyo; vowing to sacrifice his own life if Seikyo can show him the "real" Book of Tea. Seikyo promises to end his life if proven wrong.

=== Act II ===
Seikyo and Lan travel south in search of the true Book of Tea. Lan acquaints Seikyo with the legend of how tea was invented thousands of years ago. On the journey their love blossoms.

=== Act III ===
In the South, Seikyo and Lan arrive during a ritual tea ceremony, offered by Lu, daughter of Tea Sage Luyu. Lu announces Luyu's death. She consents to give Seikyo and Lan the Book of Tea on the condition that they vow to spread its wisdom throughout the world. As they read, the Prince bursts in and grabs it. A fight erupts between Seikyo and the Prince. Attempting to stop the duel, Lan is mortally wounded. Covered in blood, Lan drinks the tea of emptiness. The Prince kneels before Seikyo, presenting his sword. Instead of killing the Prince, Seikyo slices off his own hair...

The chanting of monks returns... In a Japanese tea garden, high monk Seikyo raises the empty teapot, passes the empty tea bowls, and savors the empty tea.

== Recordings ==
Tea : mirror of soul : opera in three acts. Authors: Dun Tan, Ying Xu. DVD Video, English, ©2004. Publisher:Deutsche Grammophon : Distributed by Universal Music & Video Distribution, Hamburg.
